= TER Rhône-Alpes =

Regional rail network in Rhône-Alpes, France

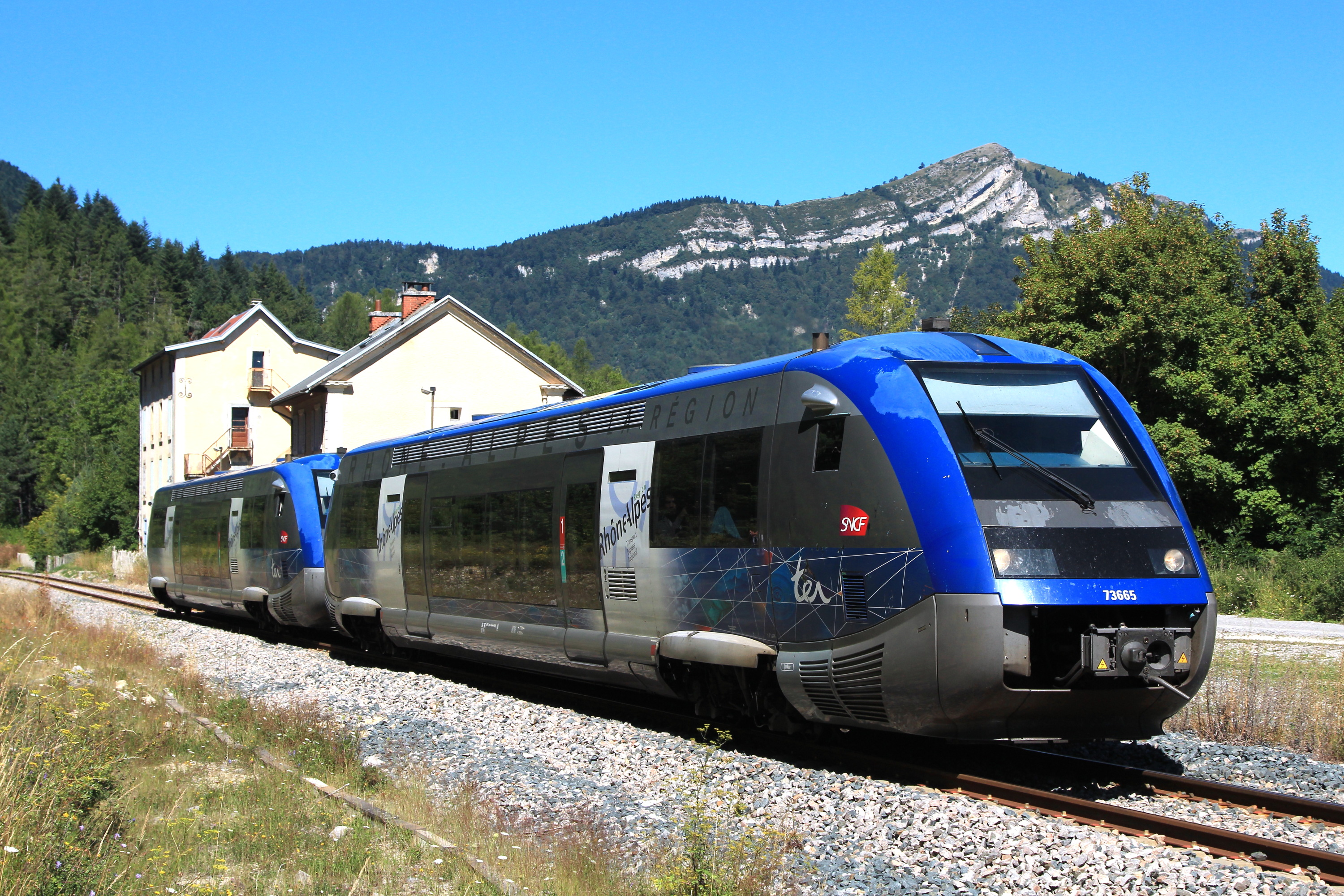
- Two X 73500 near the station of Saint-Maurice-en-Trièves.

Overview
- Website: http://www.sncf.com/en/trains/ter

Technical
- Track gauge: 1,435 mm (4 ft 8 1/2 in) standard gauge

TER Rhône-Alpes was the regional rail network serving Rhône-Alpes région, eastern France. In 2017 it was merged into the new TER Auvergne-Rhône-Alpes.

== TER network ==
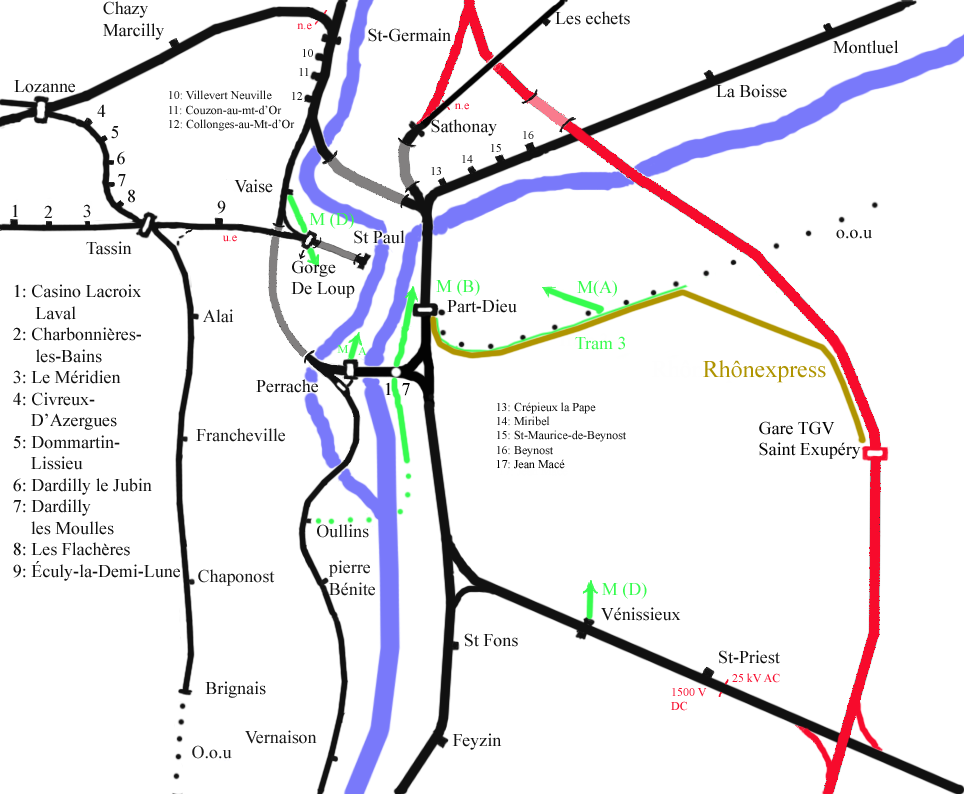
Railways around Lyon

=== Rail ===
Line	Route	Frequency	Notes
1	Lyon-Perrache/Part-Dieu ... Bourgoin-Jallieu ... Saint-André-le-Gaz ... Voiron – Grenoble		
2	Genève-Cornavin ... Bellegarde ... Aix-les-Bains-Le Revard ... Chambéry-Challes-les-Eaux ... Grenoble ... Valence branch line Annecy ... Aix-les-Bains-Le Revard		
3	Lyon-Part-Dieu ... Ambérieu ... Bellegarde ... Annemasse ... La Roche-sur-Foron ... Saint-Gervais-les-Bains-Le Fayet branch line Bellegarde – Genève-Cornavin branch line Annemasse ... Évian-les-Bains		
4	Lyon-Part-Dieu – Ambérieu – Aix-les-Bains-Le Revard – Rumilly – Annecy		
5	Lyon-Part-Dieu ... Vienne ... Valence ... Montélimar ... Avignon (see TER Provence-Alpes-Côte-d'Azur line 10 for connection Lyon – Avignon – Marseille)		
10	Le Puy-en-Velay ... Bas-Monistrol ... Firminy ... Saint-Étienne ... Givors ... Lyon-Perrache		
11	Clermont-Ferrand ... Thiers ... Noirétable ... Montbrison ... Saint-Étienne		
12	Roanne ... Feurs ... Saint-Étienne		
20	Nevers ... Moulins-sur-Allier ... Paray-le-Monial ... Lozanne ... Lyon-Perrache (see TER Bourgogne line 7 for details) branch line Lozanne ... Tassin ... Lyon-Saint-Paul		
21	Brignais ... Tassin ... Lyon-Saint-Paul		
22	Sain-Bel – L'Arbresle ... Tassin ... Lyon-Saint-Paul		
23	Lyon-Perrache ... Givors-Ville		
24	Clermont-Ferrand – Riom-Châtel-Guyon – Vichy – Roanne – Tarare – Lyon-Part-Dieu – Lyon-Perrache		
26	Mâcon-Ville ... Villefranche-sur-Saône ... Saint-Germain-au-Mont-d'Or ... Lyon-Perrache/Part-Dieu		
30	Mâcon-Ville ... Bourg-en-Bresse ... Ambérieu		
31	Bourg-en-Bresse ... Brion-Montréal-la-Cluse ... Oyonnax ... Saint-Claude		
32	Bourg-en-Bresse ... Villars-les-Dombes ... Lyon-Part-Dieu – Lyon-Perrache		
34	Bellegarde ... Genève-Cornavin		
35	Lyon-Perrache – Lyon-Part-Dieu ... Ambérieu ... Aix-les-Bains-Le Revard ... Chambéry-Challes-les-Eaux		
40	Bellegarde ... Annemasse ... La Roche-sur-Foron ... Évian-les-Bains branch line Genève-Eaux-Vives ... Annemasse		
41	Genève-Eaux-Vives ... Annemasse ... La Roche-sur-Foron ... Annecy		
42	Genève-Eaux-Vives ... Annemasse ... La Roche-sur-Foron ... Saint-Gervais-les-Bains-Le Fayet		
43	Annecy ... La Roche-sur-Foron ... Saint-Gervais-les-Bains-Le Fayet		
50	Annecy ... Aix-les-Bains-Le Revard ... Chambéry-Challes-les-Eaux		
51	Genève-Cornavin – Bellegarde ... Aix-les-Bains-Le Revard ... Chambéry-Challes-les-Eaux		
52	Chambéry-Challes-les-Eaux – Montmélian – Saint-Pierre-d'Albigny – Grésy-sur-Isère† – Frontenex† – Albertville – Notre-Dame-de-Briançon – Moûtiers-Salins-Brides-les-Bains – Aime-La Plagne – Landry – Bourg-Saint-Maurice		
53	Chambéry-Challes-les-Eaux ... Saint-Pierre-d'Albigny ... Saint-Jean-de-Maurienne ... Modane		
54	Lyon-Perrache/Part-Dieu ... Bourgoin-Jallieu ... Saint-André-le-Gaz ... Chambéry-Challes-les-Eaux		
60	Chambéry-Challes-les-Eaux ... Grenoble		
61	Grenoble-Universités-Gières ... Grenoble ... Saint-Marcellin ... Valence		
62	Saint-André-le-Gaz ... Voiron ... Grenoble		
63	Grenoble ... Veynes-Dévoluy ... Gap		
64	Valence ... Die ... Veynes-Dévoluy ... Gap ... Briançon		
70	Romans-Bourg-de-Péage – Valence TGV – Valence		
82	Saint-Gervais-les-Bains-Le Fayet ... Chamonix-Mont-Blanc ... Vallorcine		
† Not all trains call at this station

=== Road ===
- Villefranche-sur-Saône – Mâcon TGV
- Saint-Claude – Oyonnax – Bellegarde-sur-Valserine
- Bellegarde-sur-Valserine – Divonne-les-Bains
- Aubenas – Privas – Valence – Valence TGV
- Vallon-Pont-d'Arc / Les Vans – Aubenas – Montélimar – Valence TGV
- Annonay – Vienne – Lyon

== Rolling stock ==
=== Multiple units ===
- SNCF Class Z 600
- SNCF Class Z 800
- SNCF Class Z 850
- SNCF Class Z 7100
- SNCF Class Z 7500
- SNCF Class Z 9500
- SNCF Class Z 9600
- SNCF Class Z 20500 (temporarily transferred from Île-de-France's RER)
- SNCF Class Z 23500
- SNCF Class Z 24500
- SNCF Class Z 27500
- SNCF Class X 2800
- SNCF Class X 4630
- SNCF Class X 72500
- SNCF Class X 73500
- SNCF Class B 81500

=== Locomotives ===
- SNCF Class CC 6500
- SNCF Class BB 7200
- SNCF Class BB 8500
- SNCF Class BB 9600
- SNCF Class BB 22200
- SNCF Class BB 25150
- SNCF Class BB 25200
- SNCF Class BB 25500
- SNCF Class BB 67300

== Statistics ==
- 2 794 km of lines
- 4 735 km of individual railroads
- 5 928 bridges, tunnels, etc.
- 1 404 level crossings
- 534 stations

== See also ==
- Transport in Rhône-Alpes
- SNCF
- Transport express régional
- Réseau Ferré de France
- List of SNCF stations in Rhône-Alpes
- Rhône-Alpes
