= Saint-Avre–La Chambre station =

Railway station in France

Saint-Avre–La Chambre
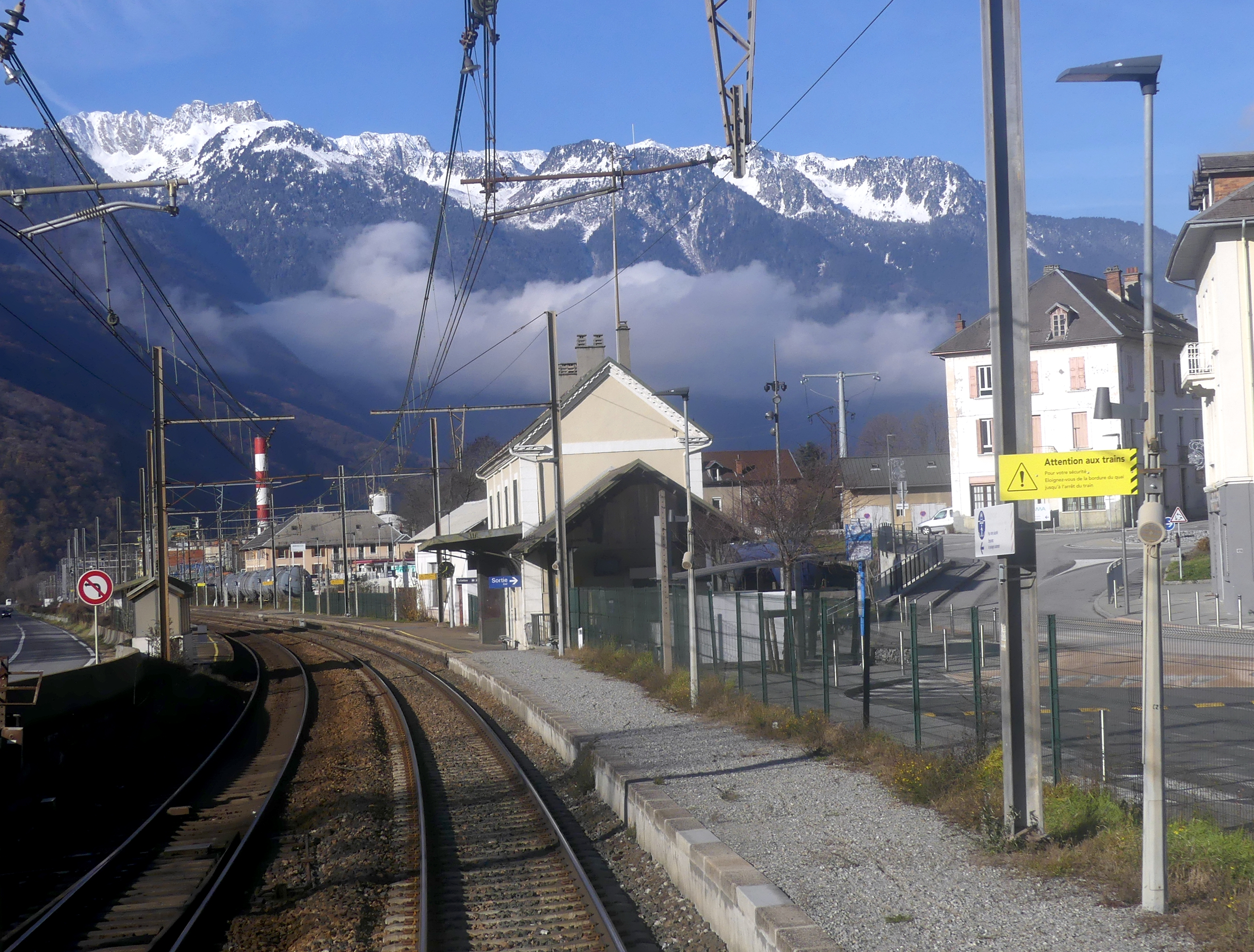
- Saint-Avre-La Chambre railway station

General information
- Location: Saint-Avre, Savoie, Rhône-Alpes, France
- Coordinates: 45°21′11″N 6°18′10″E
- Line: Culoz–Modane railway
- Platforms: 2

Other information
- Station code: 87741306

History
- Opened: 20 October 1856

Services
Preceding station	TER Auvergne-Rhône-Alpes	Following station
Épierre-Saint-Léger towards Chambéry	53	Saint-Jean-de-Maurienne towards Modane
Location

Saint-Avre–La Chambre is a railway station located in Saint-Avre, Savoie, France. The station was opened on 20 October 1856 and is located on the Culoz–Modane railway. The train services are operated by SNCF.

== Train services ==
The station is served by the following services:

- High speed services (TGV) Paris - Chambéry - Modane
- Regional services (TER Auvergne-Rhône-Alpes) Chambéry - Modane
