= Épierre–Saint-Léger station =

Railway station in France

Épierre–Saint-Léger
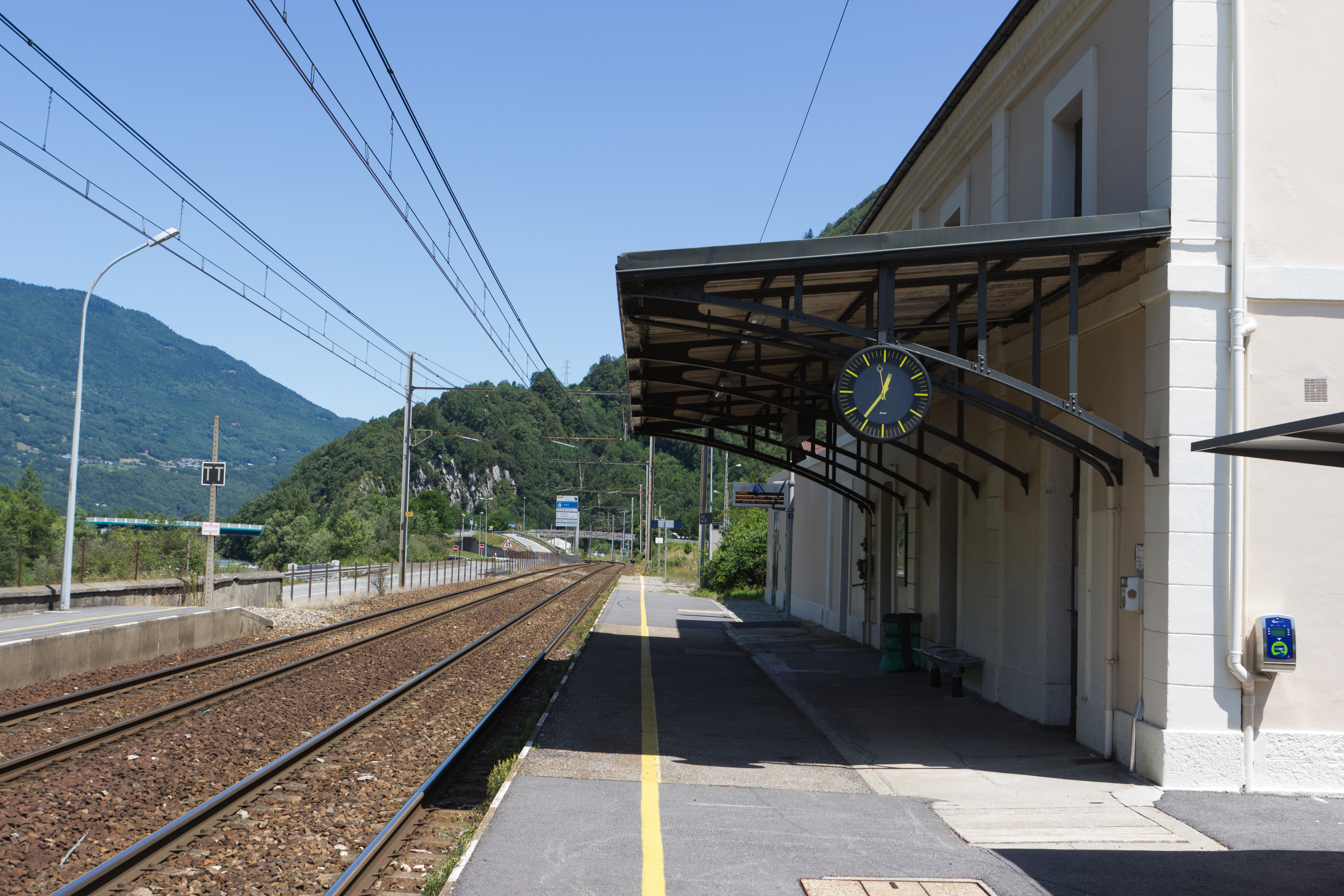
- Épierre-Saint-Léger railway station

General information
- Location: Épierre, Savoie, Rhône-Alpes, France
- Coordinates: 45°27′25″N 6°17′33″E
- Line: Culoz–Modane railway
- Platforms: 2

Other information
- Station code: 87741280

History
- Opened: 20 October 1856

Services
Preceding station	TER Auvergne-Rhône-Alpes	Following station
Aiguebelle towards Chambéry	53	Saint-Avre-La Chambre towards Modane
Location

Épierre–Saint-Léger is a railway station located in Épierre, Savoie, France. The station was opened on 20 October 1856 and is located on the Culoz–Modane railway. The train services are operated by SNCF.

== Train services ==
The station is served by the following services:

- Regional services (TER Auvergne-Rhône-Alpes) Chambéry - Modane
