= Saint-Pierre-d'Albigny station =

Railway station in France

Saint-Pierre-d'Albigny
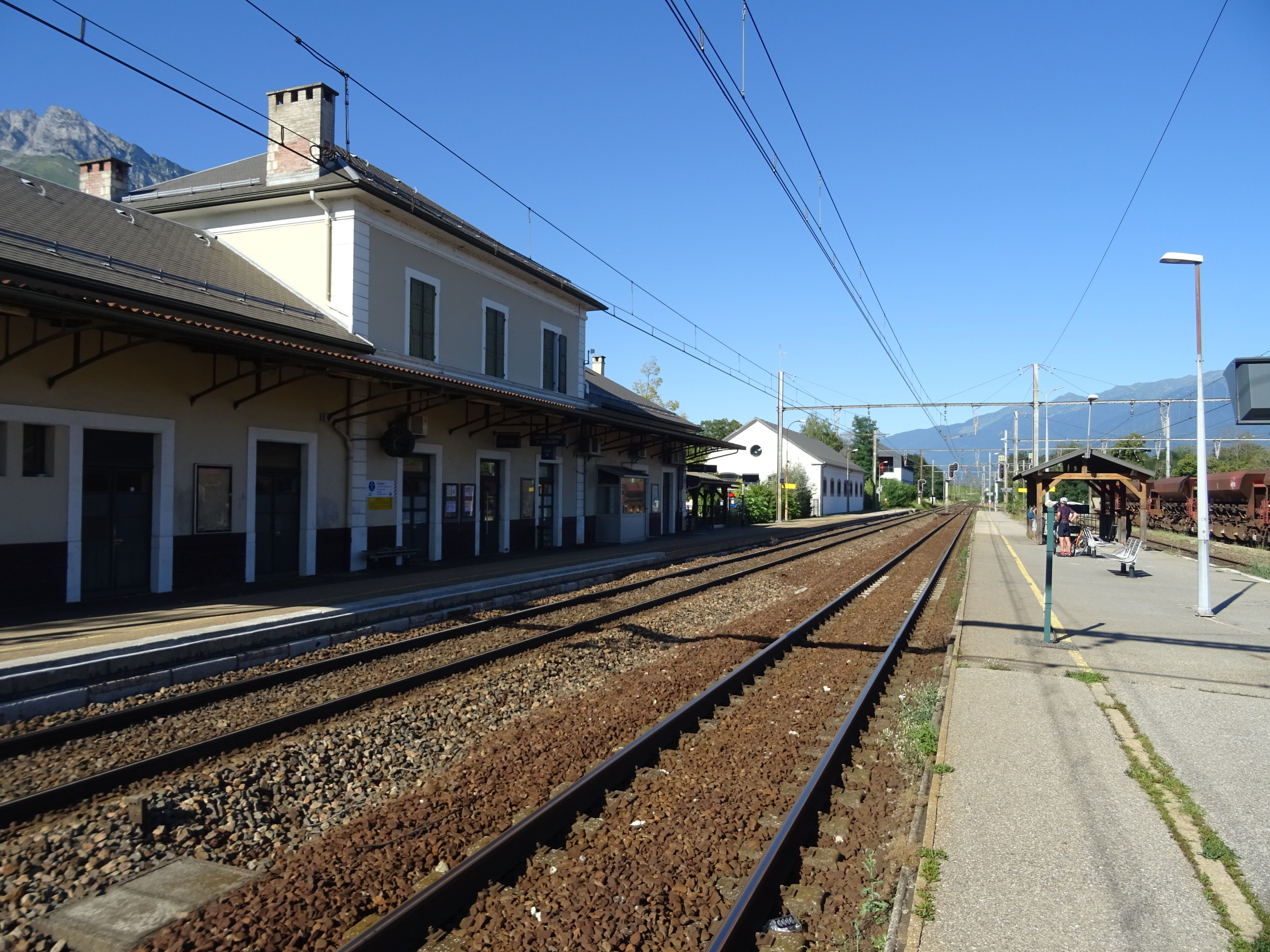
- Saint-Pierre-d'Albigny railway station

General information
- Location: Saint-Pierre-d'Albigny, Savoie, Rhône-Alpes, France
- Coordinates: 45°33′26″N 6°09′23″E
- Lines: Culoz–Modane railway Saint-Pierre-d'Albigny–Bourg-Saint-Maurice railway
- Platforms: 2

Other information
- Station code: 87741223

Services
Preceding station	TER Auvergne-Rhône-Alpes	Following station
Montmélian towards Chambéry	52	Grésy-sur-Isère towards Bourg-Saint-Maurice
Montmélian towards Chambéry	53	Chamousset towards Modane
Location

Saint-Pierre-d'Albigny is a railway station located in Saint-Pierre-d'Albigny, Savoie, France. The station is located on the Culoz–Modane railway and the Saint-Pierre-d'Albigny–Bourg-Saint-Maurice railway. The train services are operated by SNCF.

== Train services ==
The station is served by the following services:

- Regional services (TER Auvergne-Rhône-Alpes) Chambéry - Modane
- Regional services (TER Auvergne-Rhône-Alpes) Chambéry - Bourg-Saint-Maurice
