= Chamousset station =

Railway station in France

Chamousset
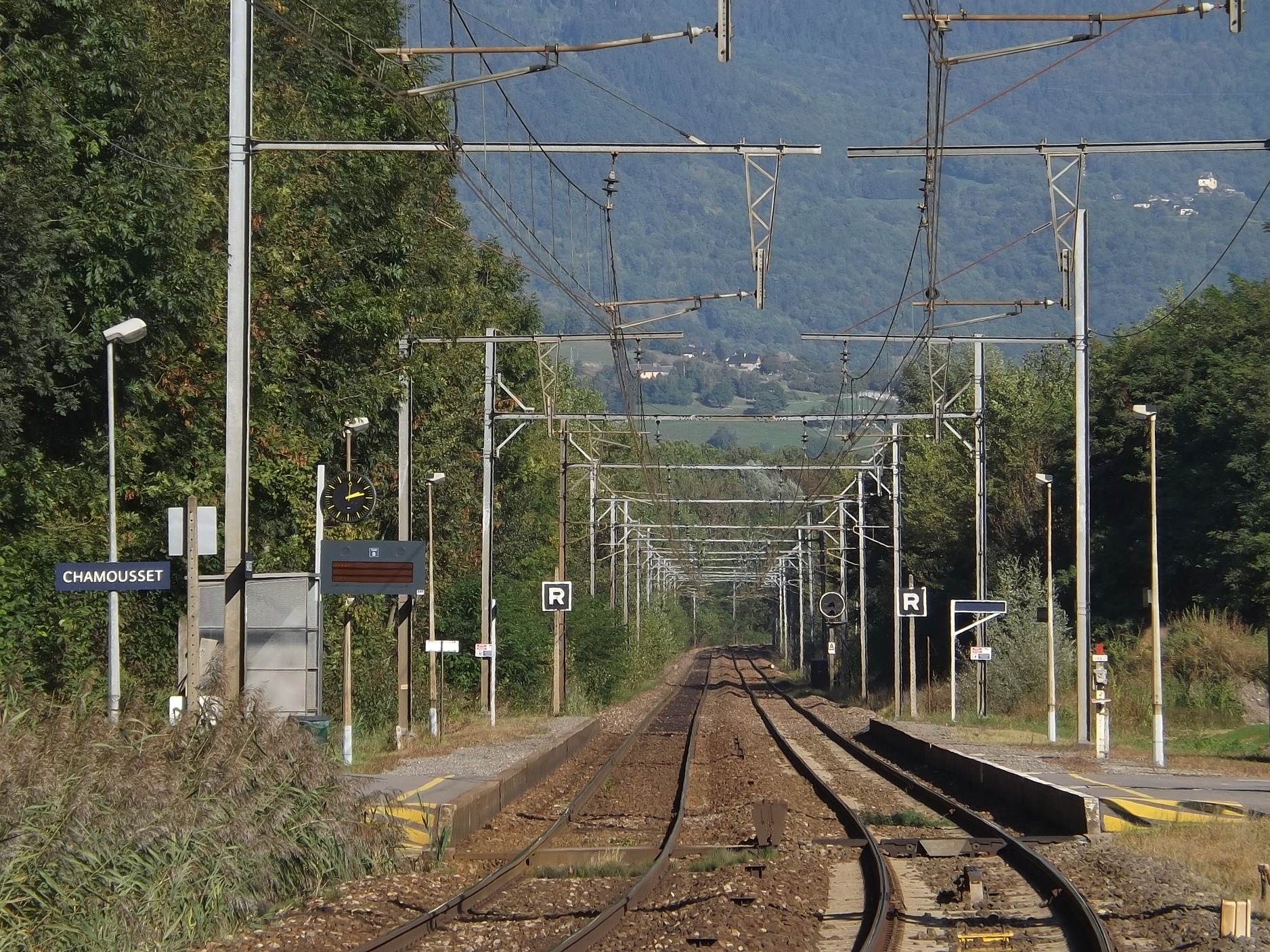
- Chamousset railway station

General information
- Location: Chamousset, Savoie, Rhône-Alpes, France
- Coordinates: 45°33′27″N 6°12′23″E
- Line: Culoz–Modane railway
- Platforms: 2

Other information
- Station code: 87741231

History
- Opened: 20 October 1856

Services
Preceding station	TER Auvergne-Rhône-Alpes	Following station
Saint-Pierre-d'Albigny towards Chambéry	53	Aiguebelle towards Modane
Location

Chamousset is a railway station located in Chamousset, Savoie, France. The station was opened on 20 October 1856 and is located on the Culoz–Modane railway. The train services are operated by SNCF.

== Train services ==
The station is served by the following services:

- Regional services (TER Auvergne-Rhône-Alpes) Chambéry - Modane
