= Montmélian station =

Railway station in Montmélian, France

Montmélian
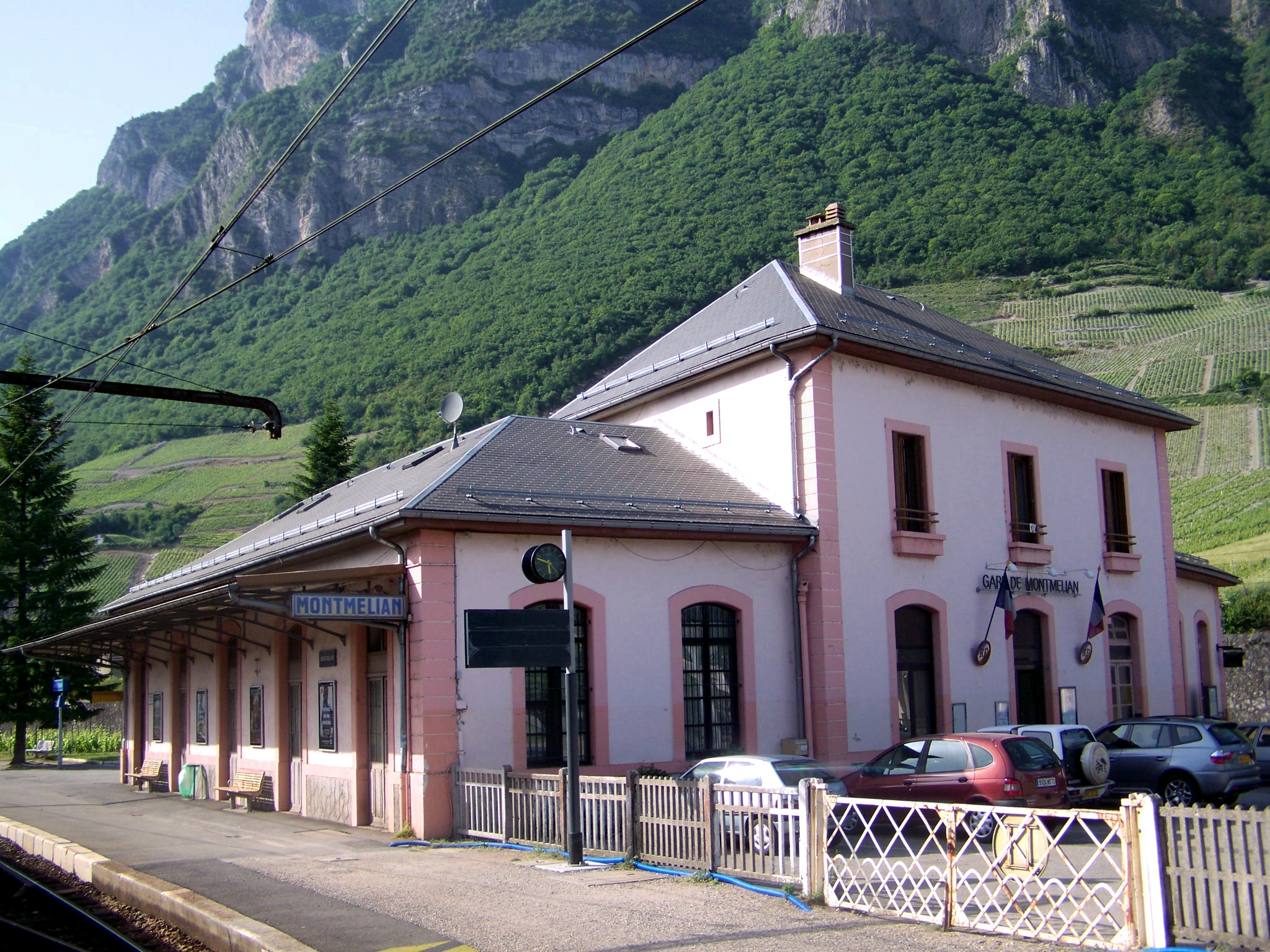
- Montmélian railway station

General information
- Location: Place de la Gare; 73800 Montmélian; Savoie; France
- Coordinates: 45°30′11″N 6°02′35″E
- Lines: Culoz–Modane railway Grenoble–Montmélian railway
- Platforms: 4

Other information
- Station code: 87741181

Services
Preceding station	TER Auvergne-Rhône-Alpes	Following station
Pontcharra-sur-Bréda towards Valence	2	Chambéry towards Annecy or Geneva
Chambéry Terminus	52	Saint-Pierre-d'Albigny towards Bourg-Saint-Maurice
Chambéry Terminus	53	Saint-Pierre-d'Albigny towards Modane
Pontcharra-sur-Bréda towards Grenoble	60	Chambéry Terminus
Location

Montmélian station (French: Gare de Montmélian) is a railway station located in Montmélian, Savoie, south-eastern France. The station is located on the Culoz–Modane railway and Grenoble–Montmélian railway. The train services are operated by SNCF.

== Train services ==
The station is served by regional trains (TER Auvergne-Rhône-Alpes) towards Chambéry, Grenoble, Lyon, Annecy, Modane and Bourg-Saint-Maurice.
