= Grenoble-Universités-Gières station =

Railway station in Gières, France

Grenoble-Universités-Gières
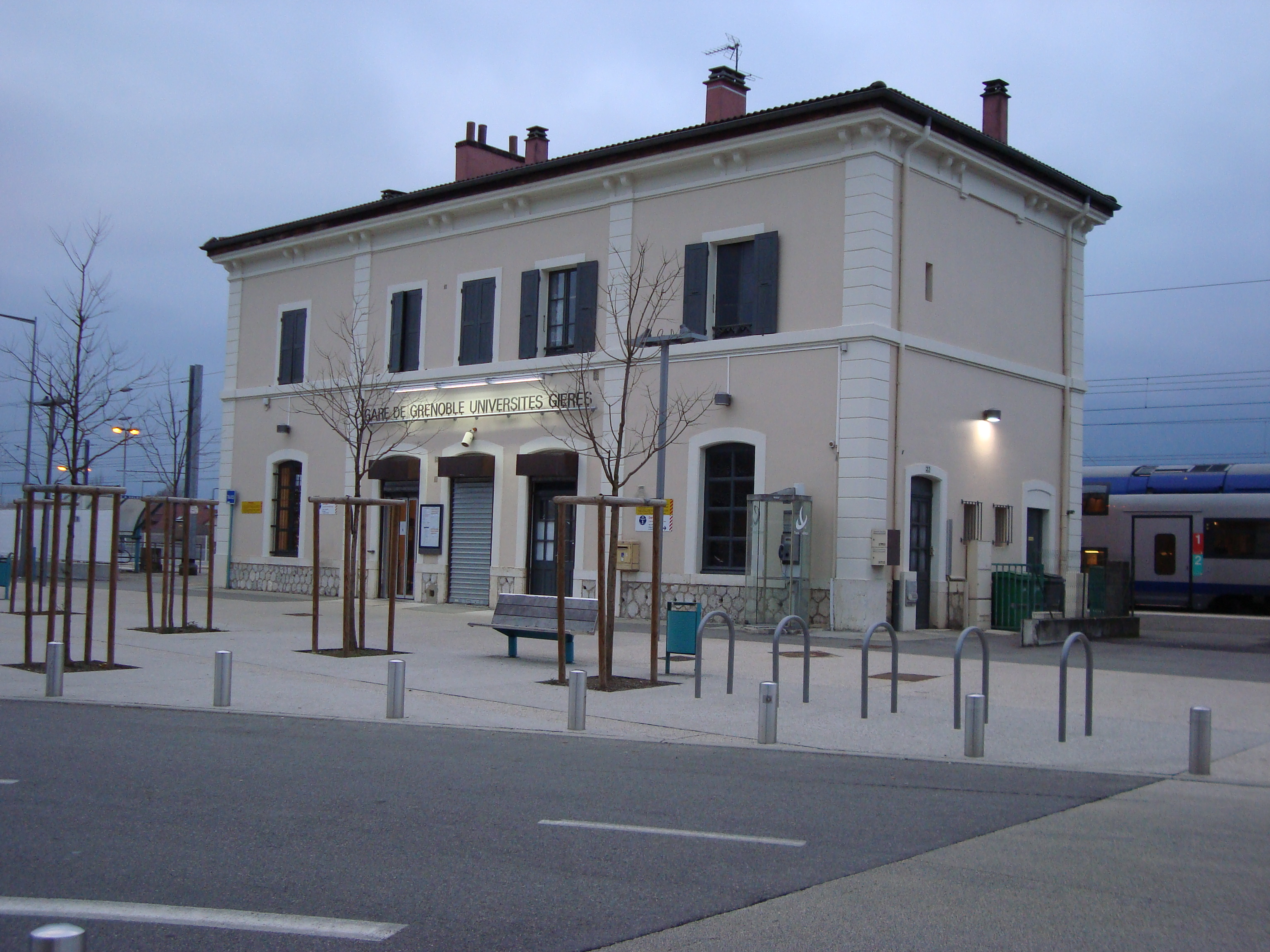
- View from Platform 1, just behind the underground passage.

General information
- Location: Gières, Isère, Auvergne-Rhône-Alpes; France
- Coordinates: 45°11′5″N 5°47′04″E
- Line: Grenoble–Montmélian railway
- Platforms: 2
- Tracks: 2 through, 2 terminus in the direction of Grenoble

History
- Opened: 15 September 1864

Services
Preceding station	TER Auvergne-Rhône-Alpes	Following station
Grenoble towards Valence	2	Pontcharra-sur-Bréda towards Annecy or Geneva
Échirolles towards Grenoble	60	Lancey towards Chambéry
Échirolles towards Valence	61	Terminus
Échirolles towards Saint-André-le-Gaz	62	Terminus
Location

Grenoble-Universités-Gières station (French: Gare de Grenoble-Universités-Gières) is a train station on the Grenoble–Montmélian railway in Greater Grenoble.

== History ==
Originally opened with the opening of the Grenoble–Montmélian Railway, its traffic gradually waned with the boom of the automobile to the point when it had a daily traffic of virtually nothing and only two trains each day (and these were both in the same direction). Few residents of Gières even knew of its existence and after many years of being neglected, in 1982 the Société Nationale des Chemins de fer Français (SNCF) decided to close it, like it would do to any other station in a deserted region.

But then William Lachenal, a member of the Association pour le Développement des Transports en Commun, a sustainable-development association, decided to distribute pamphlets to every household in Gières informing the inhabitants about the station and the possibility of using it to buy there tickets, even for departures from other stations. With twice the number of passengers the next year, the SNCF decided not to close the station and decided to let 5 more trains stop there. To further help the station's development, its name was changed to Gières-Campus due to its proximity (1 km) to the main campus of Grenoble's four universities. This all culminated into 12 trains stopping there in 1985.

Also, a free shuttle bus was put in place between the station and the campus and the platforms were given lighting and a ticket machine. In 1999 the decision was taken to extend the current tram line B to the station along with the new line C. For the arrival of the new tramway, the local quartier was radically transformed: the level crossing was replaced with a new tunnel, the local sports hall was demolished (to be built a bit further along) and replaced with a park and ride and the 2nd tram depot was built.

During all these years, the progression of the station has not stopped. Since 1989, it has been integrated into the local network as a departures-arrivals station of certain services. A siding was built to accommodate these new trains and the line is electrified between Grenoble and Gières. More and more trains stop there, not just local Transport Express Régional trains but Grandes-lignes as well. A parking was built and finally the station's name was changed to Grenoble-Universités-Gières to show its new status as the second station of Grenoble.

== See also ==
- List of SNCF stations in Auvergne-Rhône-Alpes
