= Saint-André-le-Gaz station =

Railway station in Saint-André-le-Gaz, France

Coordinates: 45°32′41″N 5°31′28″E

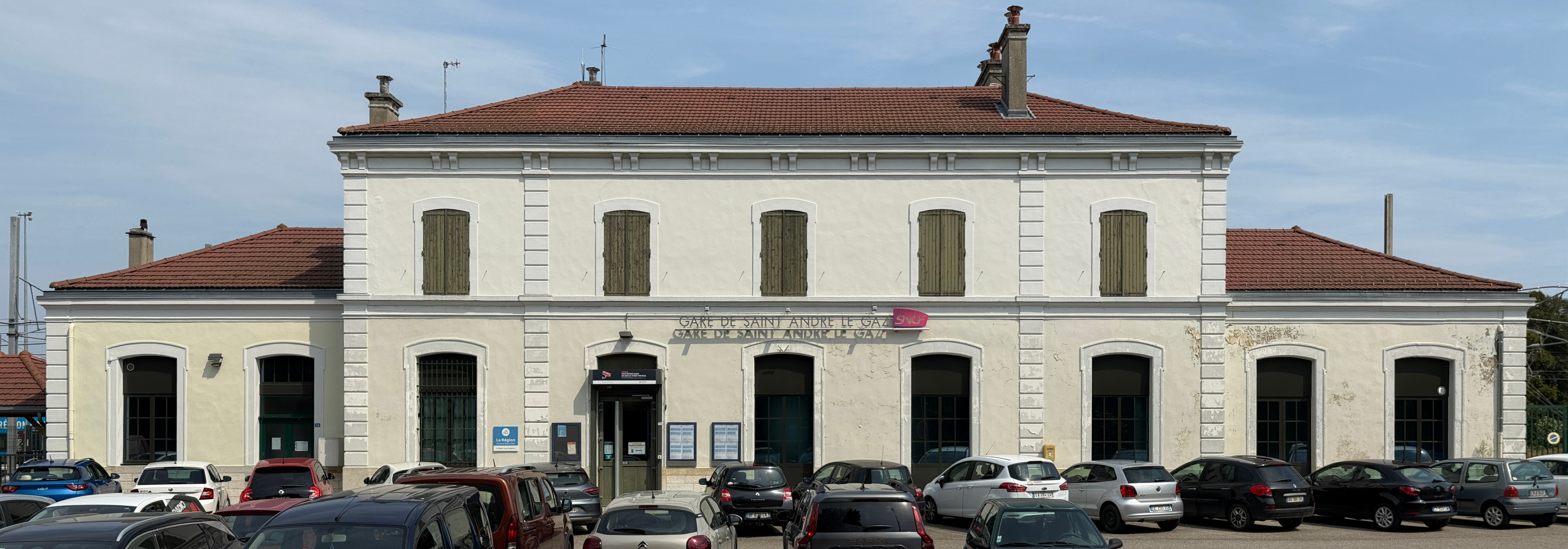
Saint-André-le-Gaz railway station

Saint-André-le-Gaz station is a railway station serving the town Saint-André-le-Gaz, Isère department, southeastern France. The station is served by regional trains towards Lyon, Grenoble and Chambéry.

Preceding station	TER Auvergne-Rhône-Alpes	Following station
La Tour-du-Pin towards Lyon-Perrache	1	Terminus
La Tour-du-Pin towards Lyon-Part-Dieu	54	Les Abrets-Fitilieu towards Chambéry
Terminus	62	Virieu-sur-Bourbre towards Grenoble-Universités-Gières
