= Grenoble–Montmélian railway =

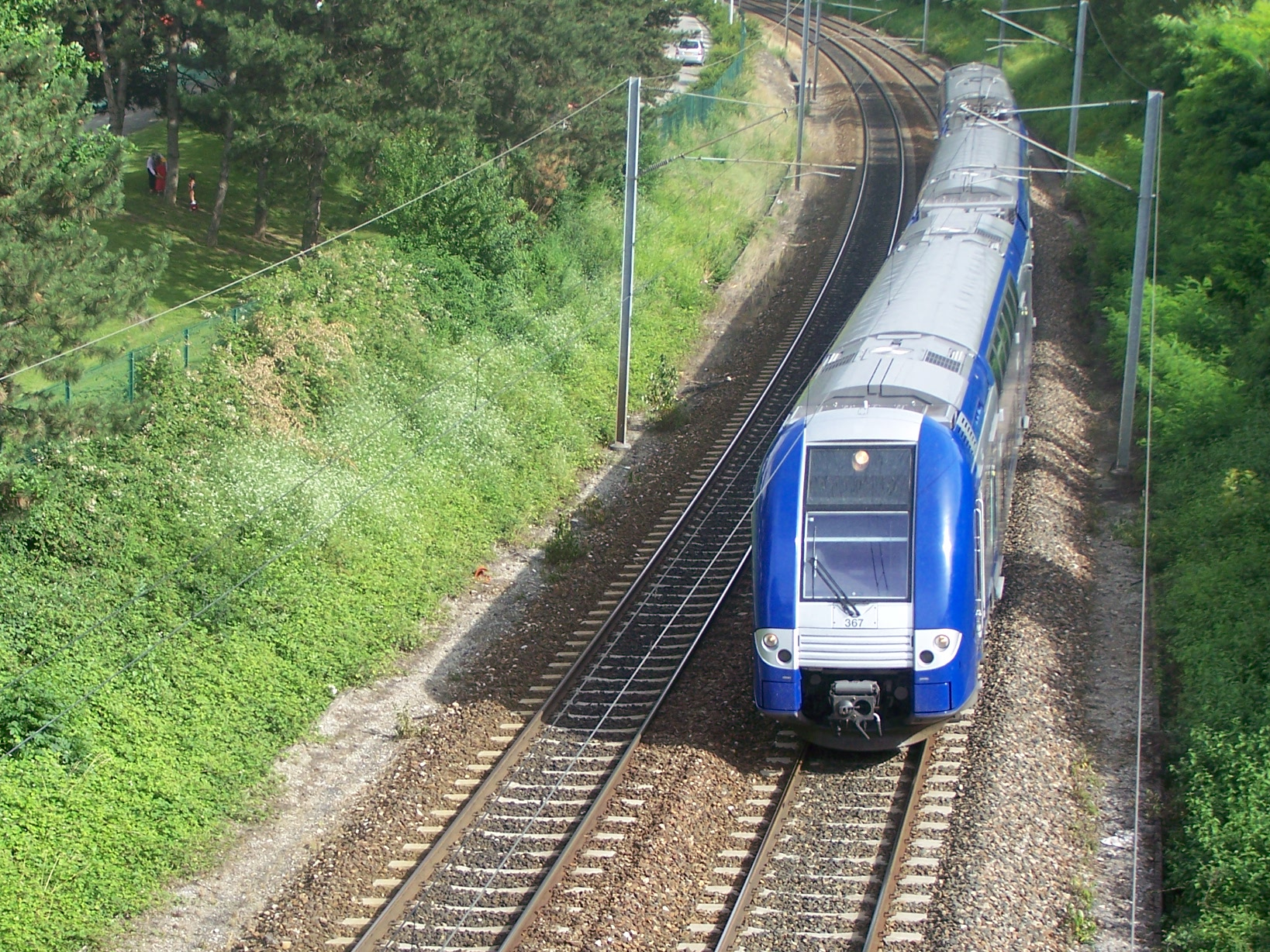
- A Z 24500 leaving Échirolles for Lyon

Overview
- Status: Operational
- Owner: RFF
- Locale: France (Auvergne-Rhône-Alpes)
- Termini: Grenoble station; Montmélian station

Service
- System: SNCF
- Operator(s): SNCF

History
- Opened: 1864

Technical
- Line length: 52 km (32 mi)
- Number of tracks: Double track
- Track gauge: 1,435 mm (4 ft 8 1/2 in) standard gauge
- Electrification: 25 kV AC
Route map

The railway from Grenoble to Montmélian is a 52 km (32 mi) long railway in southeastern France. It was built by the PLM and opened on 15 September 1864 (as a double track) to provide a link between Grenoble and Montmélian. In September 1991 it was electrified between Grenoble and Gières and electrification of the whole line was realised and in service by 15 December 2013.

== History ==
In the past, the line took a route more north, closer to the centre of Grenoble. However, as part of the city's preparations for the 1968 Winter Olympics, the route was moved south, next to the Rocade Sud. A station was opened at Eybens and was used to serve the nearby Olympic Village. This deviation added about 3 km (1.9 mi) to the total length of the track. So as not to have the laborious task of changing all the milestones along the route, this new section was given distances as if it were part of the Ligne de Lyon - Grenoble, all the while staying part of this line. A part of the old line still exists at 45°10′46.10″N 5°43′12.16″E.

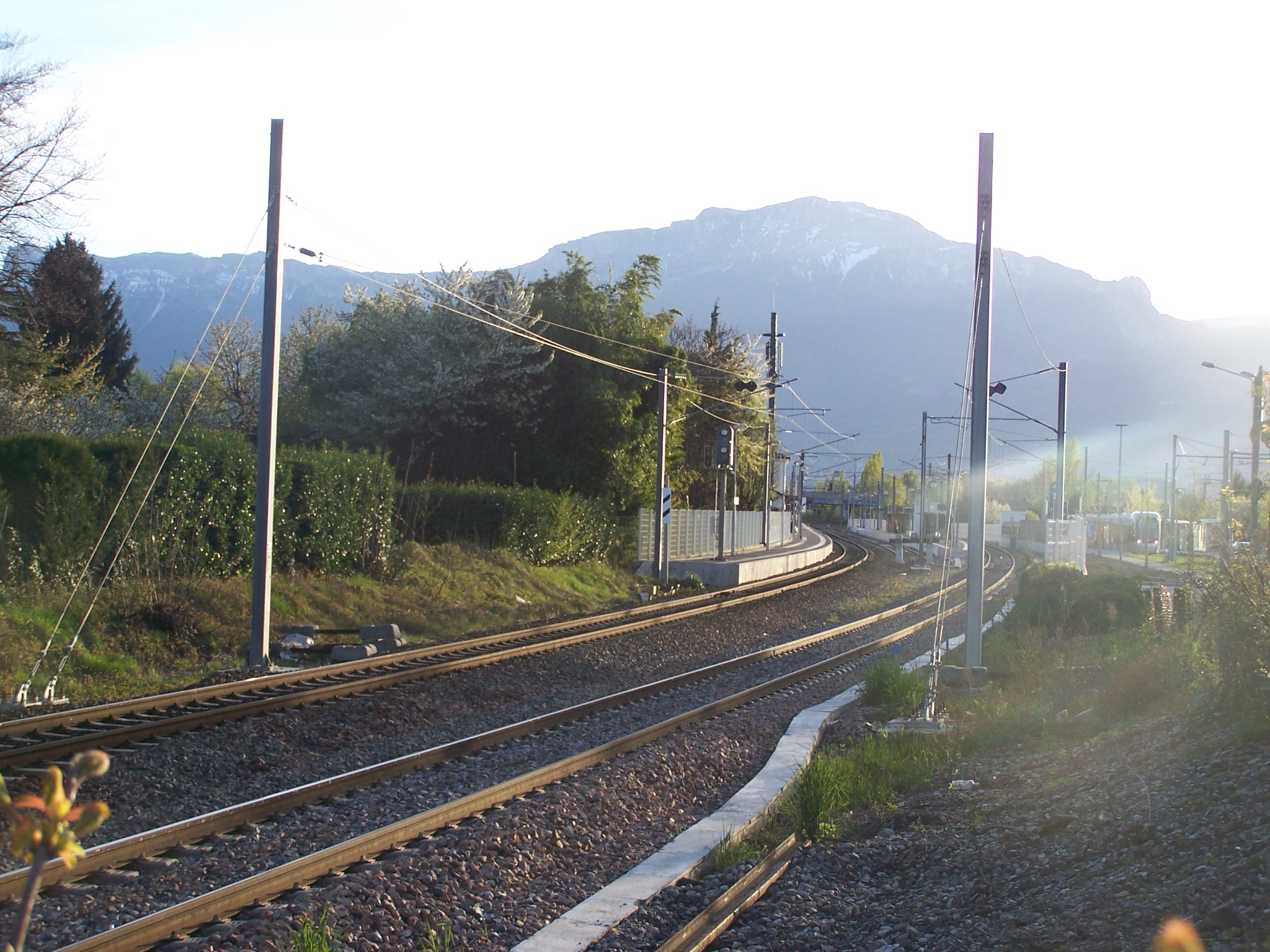
The end of electrification at Grenoble Universités-Gières until 2013

In an effort to make the line more profitable, the stations St Hélène du Lac, Le-Cheylas-la-Bussière, Tencin-Theys, Lancey and Domène were all closed to passenger traffic during the 1990s. Domène station stayed open in order to man the nearby factory slidings although trains do not stop. There is also a bus service between Goncelin and Le-Cheylas-la-Bussière. Lancey was reopened in 2005, something very exceptional in France. For this, the station was completely refurbished.

== See also ==
- TER Auvergne-Rhône-Alpes
- List of SNCF stations in Auvergne-Rhône-Alpes
- SNCF
- RFF
