= Gap station =

Railway station in Gap, France

Coordinates: 44°33′50″N 6°5′8″E

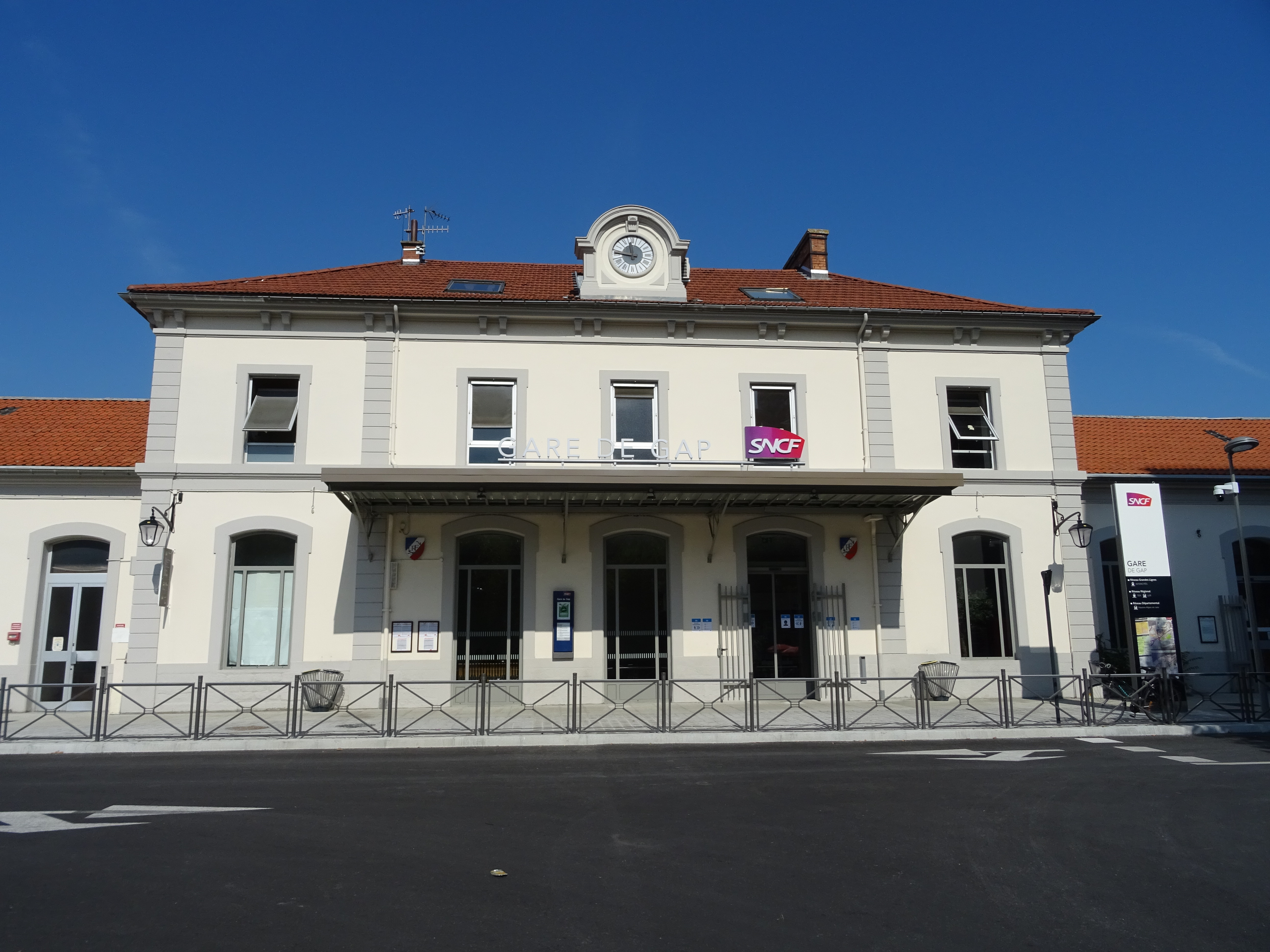
The passenger building of Gap station.

Gap station (French: Gare de Gap) is a railway station serving the town Gap, Hautes-Alpes department, southeastern France. It is situated on the Veynes–Briançon railway. The station is served by night trains to Paris and Briançon, and by regional trains towards Briançon, Grenoble, Valence and Marseille.

Preceding station	SNCF	Following station
Veynes-Dévoluy towards Paris-Austerlitz	Intercités (night)	Chorges towards Briançon
Preceding station	TER Auvergne-Rhône-Alpes	Following station
Veynes-Dévoluy towards Grenoble	63	Terminus
Veynes-Dévoluy towards Romans-Bourg-de-Péage	64	Chorges towards Briançon
Preceding station	TER PACA	Following station
Chorges towards Briançon	13	Veynes-Dévoluy towards Marseille
