= Saint-Jean-de-Maurienne station =

Railway station in Saint-Jean-de-Maurienne, France

Saint-Jean-de-Maurienne Vallée de l'Arvan
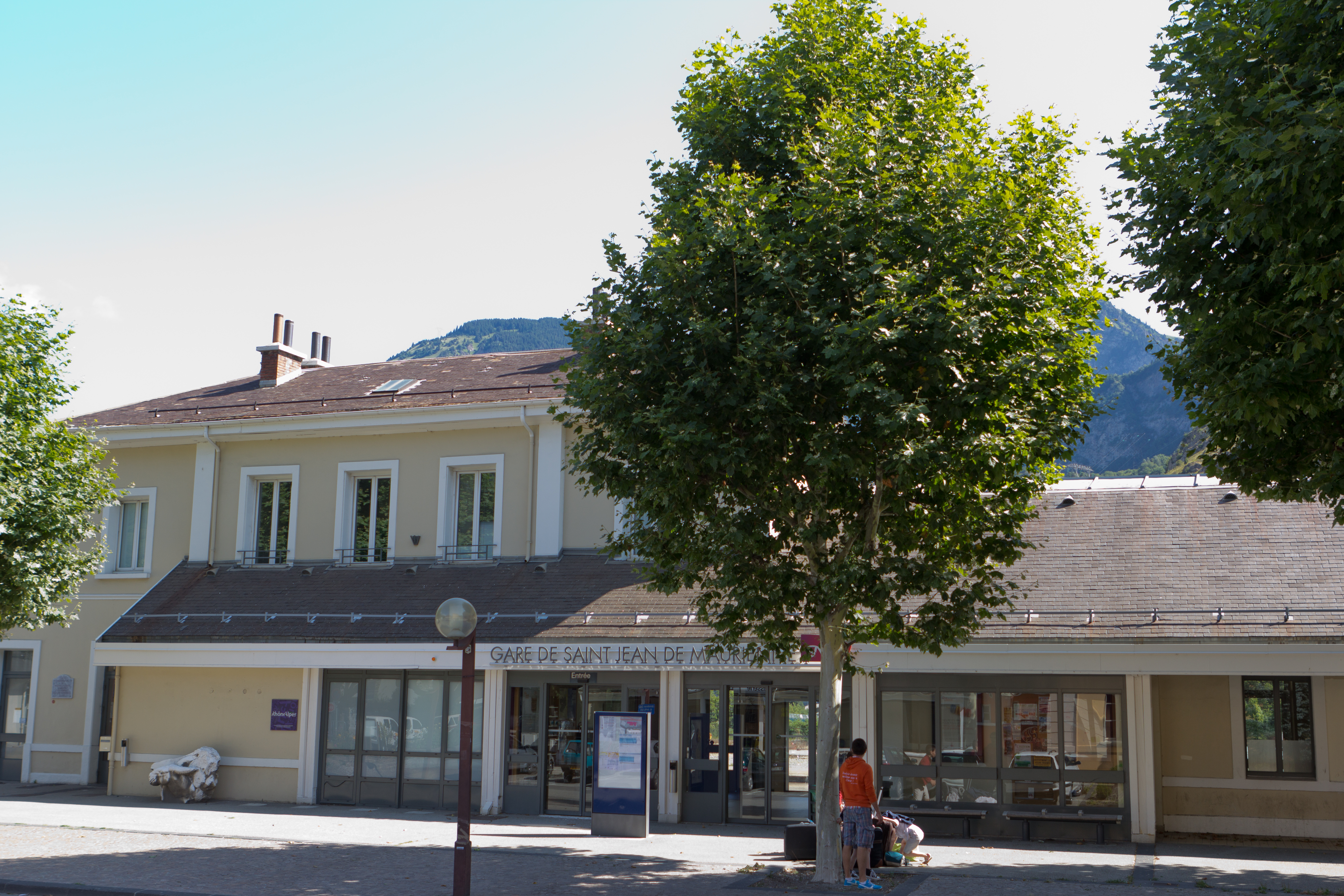
- Saint-Jean-de-Maurienne railway station

General information
- Location: Saint-Jean-de-Maurienne, Savoie, Rhône-Alpes, France
- Coordinates: 45°16′40″N 6°21′17″E
- Line: Culoz–Modane railway
- Platforms: 3
- Tracks: 3

Other information
- Station code: 87742320

History
- Opened: 20 October 1856

Services
Preceding station	SNCF	Following station
Chambéry-Challes-les-Eaux towards Paris-Lyon	TGV inOui	Modane towards Milan
Preceding station	Trenitalia	Following station
Chambéry–Challes–les–Eaux towards Paris-Lyon	Frecciarossa	Modane towards Milano Centrale
Preceding station	TER Auvergne-Rhône-Alpes	Following station
Saint-Avre-La Chambre towards Chambéry	53	Saint-Michel-Valloire towards Modane
Location

Saint-Jean-de-Maurienne (also Saint-Jean de Maurienne–Vallée de l'Arvan) is a railway station located in Saint-Jean-de-Maurienne, Savoie, France. The station was opened on 20 October 1856 and is located on the Culoz–Modane railway. The train station is operated by SNCF, with TGV inOui, Frecciarossa and regional TER rail services.

In the 2020s, it is rebuilt in the context of the construction of the Lyon-Turin high-speed railway, to make it an international station, since the tunnel at the base of Mount Ambin is just a few hundred meters further to the southeast.

== History ==
The "Saint-Jean de Maurienne" station is opened on October 20, 1856 by the Victor Emmanuel Railway company, as it opened the track section between Aix-les-Bains and Saint-Jean de Maurienne.

The station becomes part of the French railway network on the 11th of June 1860, official date of the annexation of Savoie.

In 1861, in his Guide for the visitor of the departments of Savoie and Haute-Savoie (fr: Guide de l'étranger dans les départements de la Savoie et de la Haute-Savoie), Gabriel de Mortillet appreciated the quality of the Buffet service but noted that getting downtown from the station requires either a very steep path, or a long detour by the road.

=== New station ===
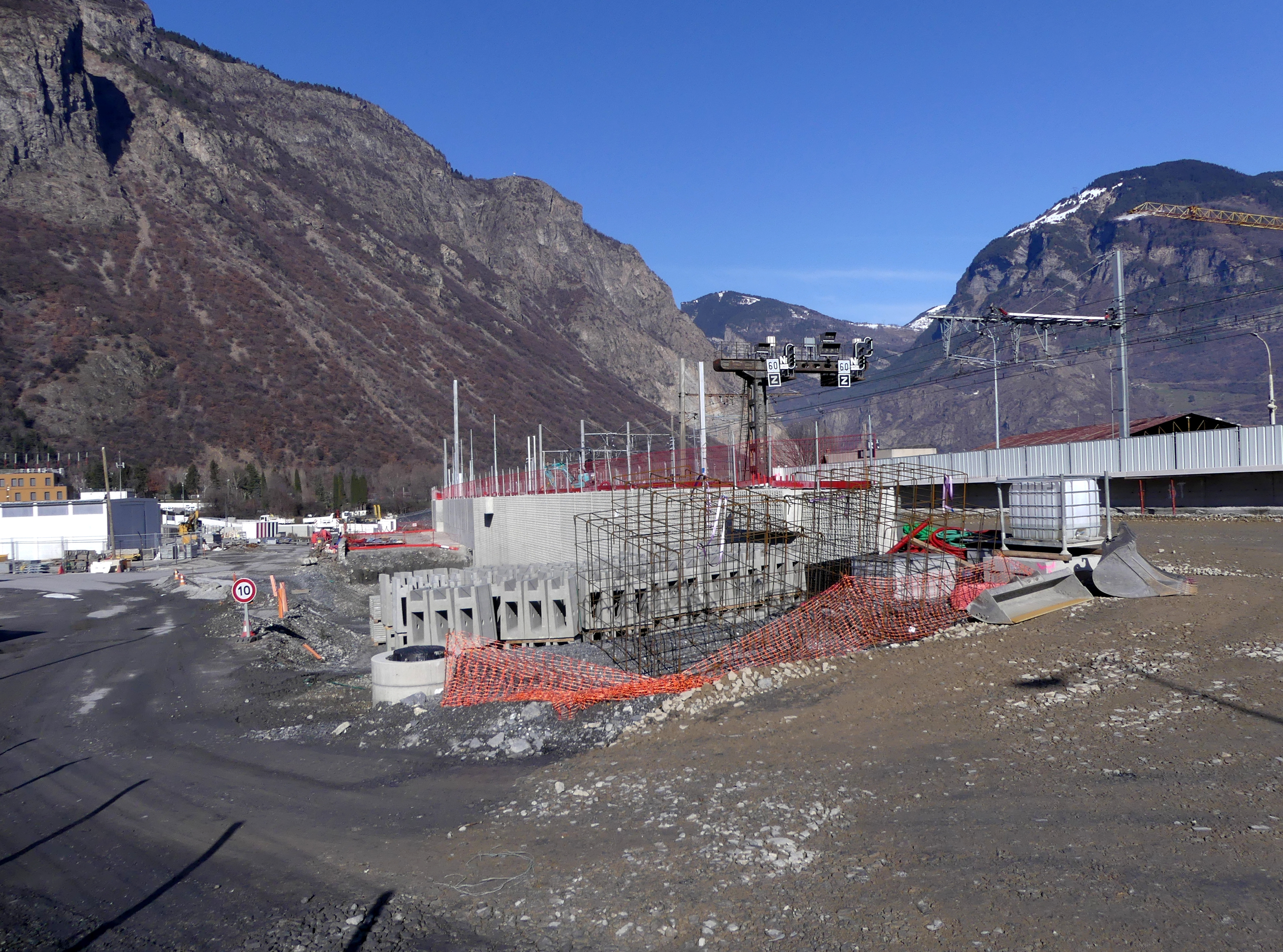
A view of the construction, in February 2025

As part of the construction of the Lyon-Turin railway, a new international train station is being built, with an opening projected for 2030.

== Train services ==
As of November 2025, the station serves as a stop on connections between Paris and Italy, as well as on regional rail services.

=== International services ===
- High speed services
  - 3 TGV InOui per day in each direction on the Paris-Lyon - Chambéry - Turin - Milan-Porta Garibaldi route
  - 2 FRECCIAROSSA per day in each direction on the Paris-Lyon - Lyon - Turin - Milan-Centrale route

=== National services ===
- High speed services
  - Seasonal TGV InOui on routes going from Brest, Lille, Nantes, Quimper, Rennes, or Paris-Lyon to Modane
- Regional services
  - 11 weekday ALLO TER Auvergne-Rhône-Alpes #53 in each direction on the Modane-Chambéry(-Lyon) route
