= Chamousset, Savoie =

Chamousset
- Commune
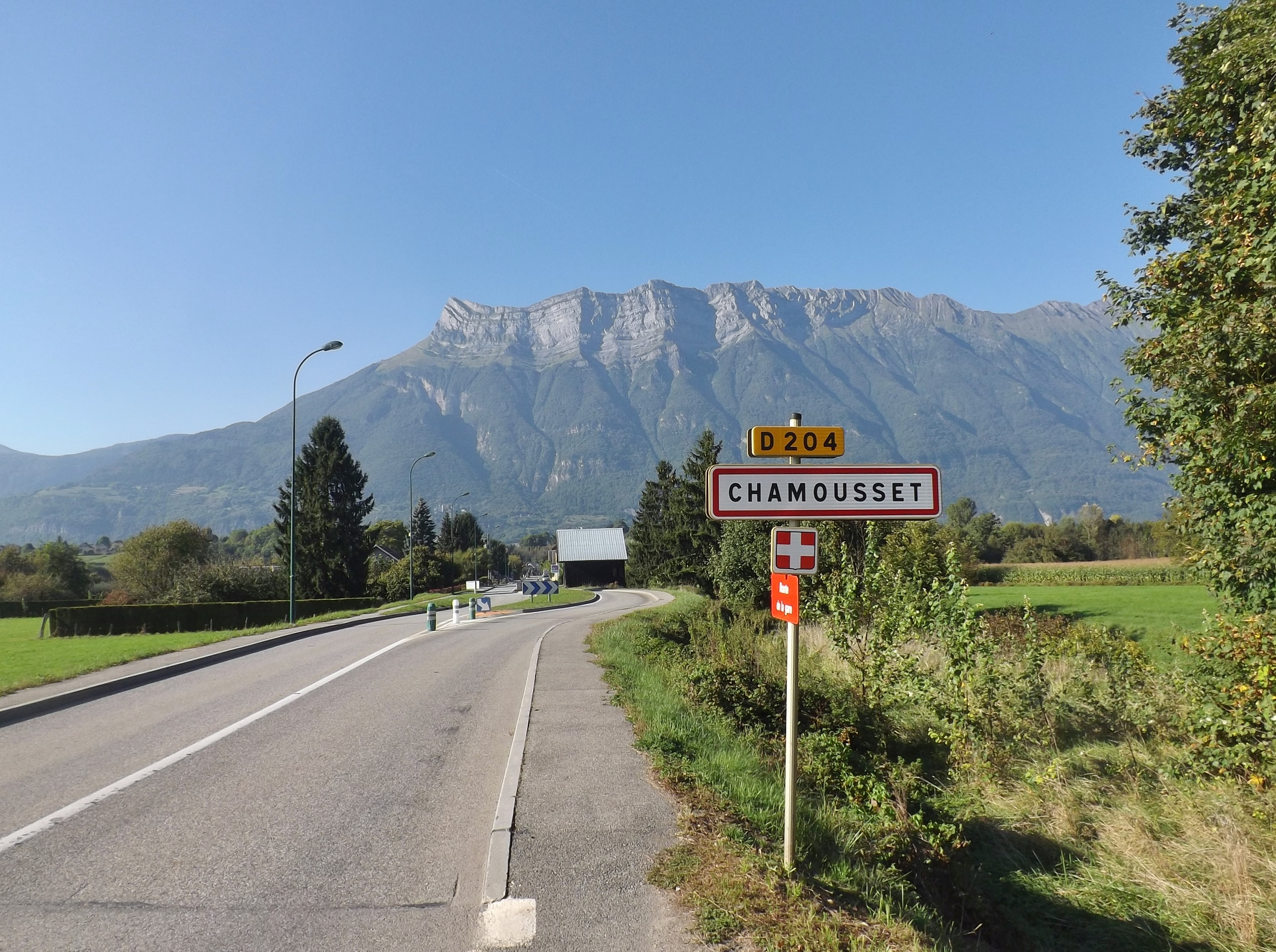
- The road into Chamousset
- Location of Chamousset
- Location within France Location within Auvergne-Rhône-Alpes
- Coordinates: 45°33′24″N 6°12′00″E
- Country: France
- Region: Auvergne-Rhône-Alpes
- Department: Savoie
- Arrondissement: Chambéry
- Canton: Saint-Pierre-d'Albigny

Government
  - Mayor (2020–2026): Yannick Logerot
- Area^{1}: 6.31 km^{2} (2.44 sq mi)
- Highest elevation: 325 m (1,066 ft)
- Lowest elevation: 280 m (920 ft)
- Population (2023): 621
  - Density: 98.4/km^{2} (255/sq mi)
- Time zone: UTC+01:00 (CET)
  - Summer (DST): UTC+02:00 (CEST)
- INSEE/Postal code: 73068 /73390
- ^{1} French Land Register data, which excludes lakes, ponds, glaciers > 1 km^{2} (0.386 sq mi or 247 acres) and river estuaries.

Chamousset (French pronunciation: [ʃamusɛ]) is a commune in the Savoie department in the Auvergne-Rhône-Alpes region in south-eastern France.

== See also ==
- Communes of the Savoie department
- Chamousset station
