= Épierre =

Épierre Épyére (Savoyard)
- Commune
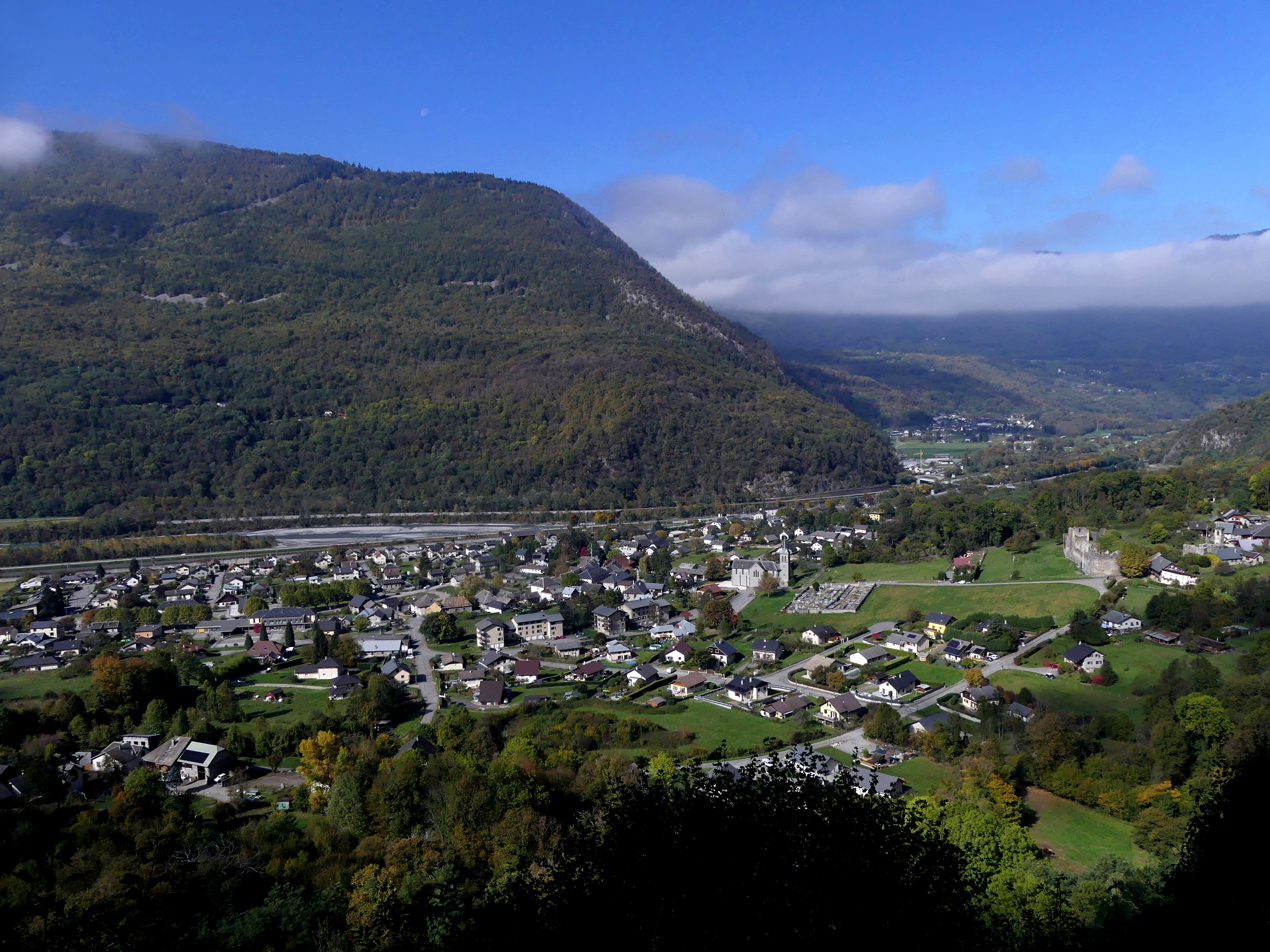
- Location of Épierre
- Location within France Location within Auvergne-Rhône-Alpes
- Coordinates: 45°27′17″N 6°17′43″E
- Country: France
- Region: Auvergne-Rhône-Alpes
- Department: Savoie
- Arrondissement: Saint-Jean-de-Maurienne
- Canton: Saint-Pierre-d'Albigny

Government
  - Mayor (2020–2026): Sylvain Conti
- Area^{1}: 19.36 km^{2} (7.47 sq mi)
- Highest elevation: 2,746 m (9,009 ft)
- Lowest elevation: 348 m (1,142 ft)
- Population (2023): 757
  - Density: 39.1/km^{2} (101/sq mi)
- Time zone: UTC+01:00 (CET)
  - Summer (DST): UTC+02:00 (CEST)
- INSEE/Postal code: 73109 /73220
- Website: www.epierre-savoie.com
- ^{1} French Land Register data, which excludes lakes, ponds, glaciers > 1 km^{2} (0.386 sq mi or 247 acres) and river estuaries.

Épierre (French pronunciation: [epjɛʁ], (Savoyard: Épyére) is a commune in the Savoie department in the Auvergne-Rhône-Alpes region in south-eastern France.

== See also ==
- Communes of the Savoie department
- Épierre-Saint-Léger station
