= Saint-Étienne-Châteaucreux station =

Railway station in Saint-Étienne, France

Saint-Étienne Châteaucreux
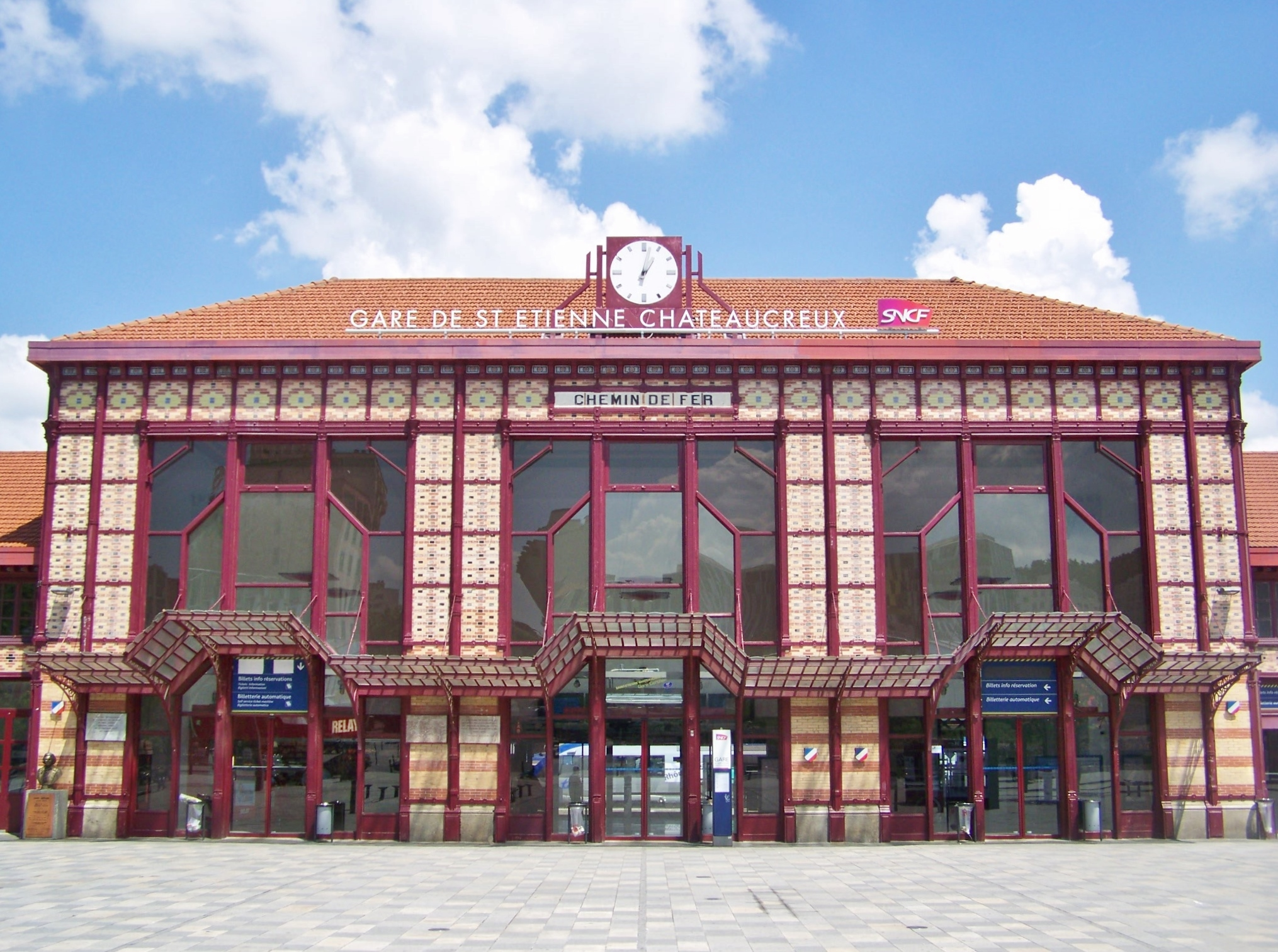
- The passenger building and entrance to the station

General information
- Location: 2, Esplanade de France, 42000; Saint-Étienne; France
- Coordinates: 45.4434°N 4.3995°E
- Elevation: 513 m (1,683 ft)
- Owner: SNCF
- Operator: SNCF
- Lines: Moret–Lyon; Saint-Georges-d'Aurac–Saint-Étienne-Châteaucreux; Saint-Étienne–Lyon

Passengers
- 2024: 4,203,481
Services
Preceding station	SNCF	Following station
Lyon-Part-Dieu towards Paris-Lyon	TGV inOui	Terminus
Preceding station	TER Auvergne-Rhône-Alpes	Following station
Saint-Étienne-Carnot towards Le Puy-en-Velay	9	Terminus
Terminus	10	Saint-Chamond towards Lyon-Perrache or Lyon-Part-Dieu
Saint-Étienne-La Terrasse towards Montbrison	11	Terminus
Saint-Étienne-La Terrasse towards Roanne	12	Terminus
Location

Saint-Étienne Châteaucreux station (French: Gare de Saint-Étienne-Châteaucreux) is the main railway station in the town of Saint-Étienne. The station is situated in Châteaucreux, a little outside the centre of Saint-Étienne. The station is linked to the town centre by the town's second tramway line. It is situated at a junction of railway lines: Moret–Lyon (via Nevers and Roanne), and lines to Clermont-Ferrand and Le Puy-en-Velay.

== History ==
Châteaucreux was built in 1855 in classical style by architect Joseph-Antoine Bouvard for the PLM. The building is a sculpted metal structure filed with coloured bricks. It was built this way due to the subsidence of the ground. The station's passenger hall has kept its original features.

== Destinations ==
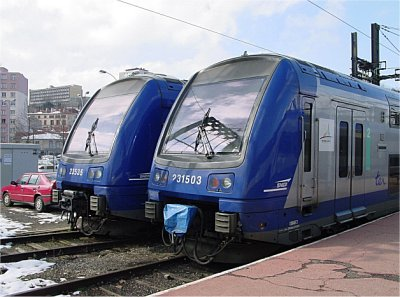
Modern rolling stock at Saint-Etienne.

Grandes Lignes (Intercity):

- Saint-Étienne - Paris. TGV service.

TER Auvergne-Rhône-Alpes (regional services):

- Saint-Étienne - Firminy - Le Puy-en-Velay
- Saint-Étienne - Montbrison - Boën
- Saint-Étienne - Givors - Lyon
- Saint-Étienne - Roanne
