= SNCF Class BB 25150 =

Class of 45 French dual-voltage electric locomotives

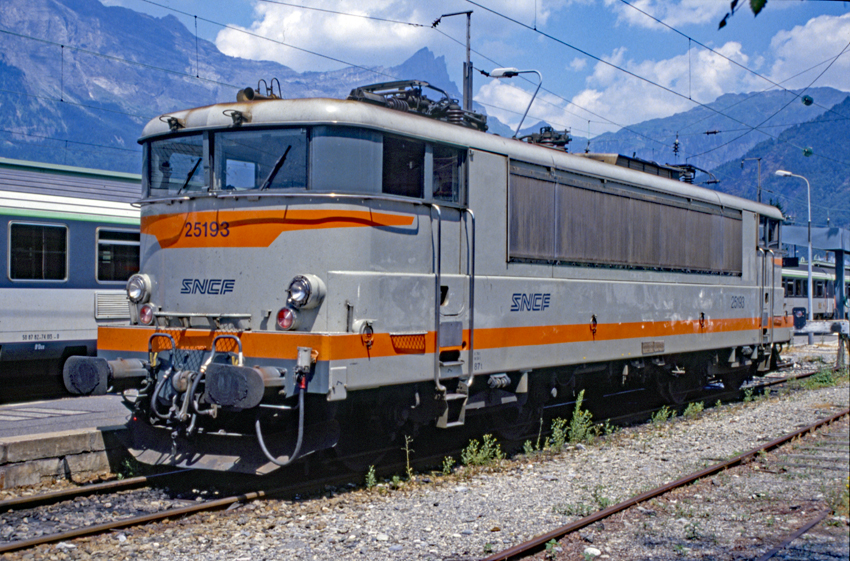
- BB 25193 at St Gervais-les-Bains
Type and origin
- Power type: Electric
- Designer: André Jacquemin
- Builder: Materiel de Traction Electrique (MTE)
- Build date: 1967–1969; 1974; 1976–1977
- Total produced: 45
- Rebuild date: 2003
- Number rebuilt: 4
Specifications
- Configuration
  - AAR: B-B
  - UIC: Bo′Bo′
  - Commonwealth: Bo-Bo
- Gauge: 1,435 mm (4 ft 8 1/2 in)
- Wheel diameter: 1,250 mm (49 in)
- Length: 16.2 m (53 ft); 16.68 m (54.7 ft); 16.73 m (54.9 ft)
- Loco weight: 85 t (84 long tons; 94 short tons); 89 t (88 long tons; 98 short tons)
- Power supply: 1500 V DC/25 kV AC
- Electric system/s: Catenary
- Current pickup(s): Pantograph
- Loco brake: Rheostatic
Performance figures
- Maximum speed: 130 km/h (81 mph)
- Power output
  - Continuous: 3,400 kW (4,600 hp) @ 1500 V; 4,130 kW (5,540 hp) @ 25 kV
- Tractive effort: 367 kN (83,000 lb_{f})
Career
- Operators: SNCF
- Class: BB 25150
- Numbers: BB 25151– BB25195
- Nicknames: BB Jacquemin
- Withdrawn: 2003–2013
- Preserved: BB 25173, BB 25188

The BB 25150 is a class of electric locomotives in service with the French railways SNCF, built by Materiel de Traction Electrique (MTE) between 1967 and 1976. They are dual voltage locomotives working off both 1500 V DC and 25 kV 50 Hz AC. Designed by André Jacquemin, the class is a development of the earlier BB 25100.

== Construction and use ==
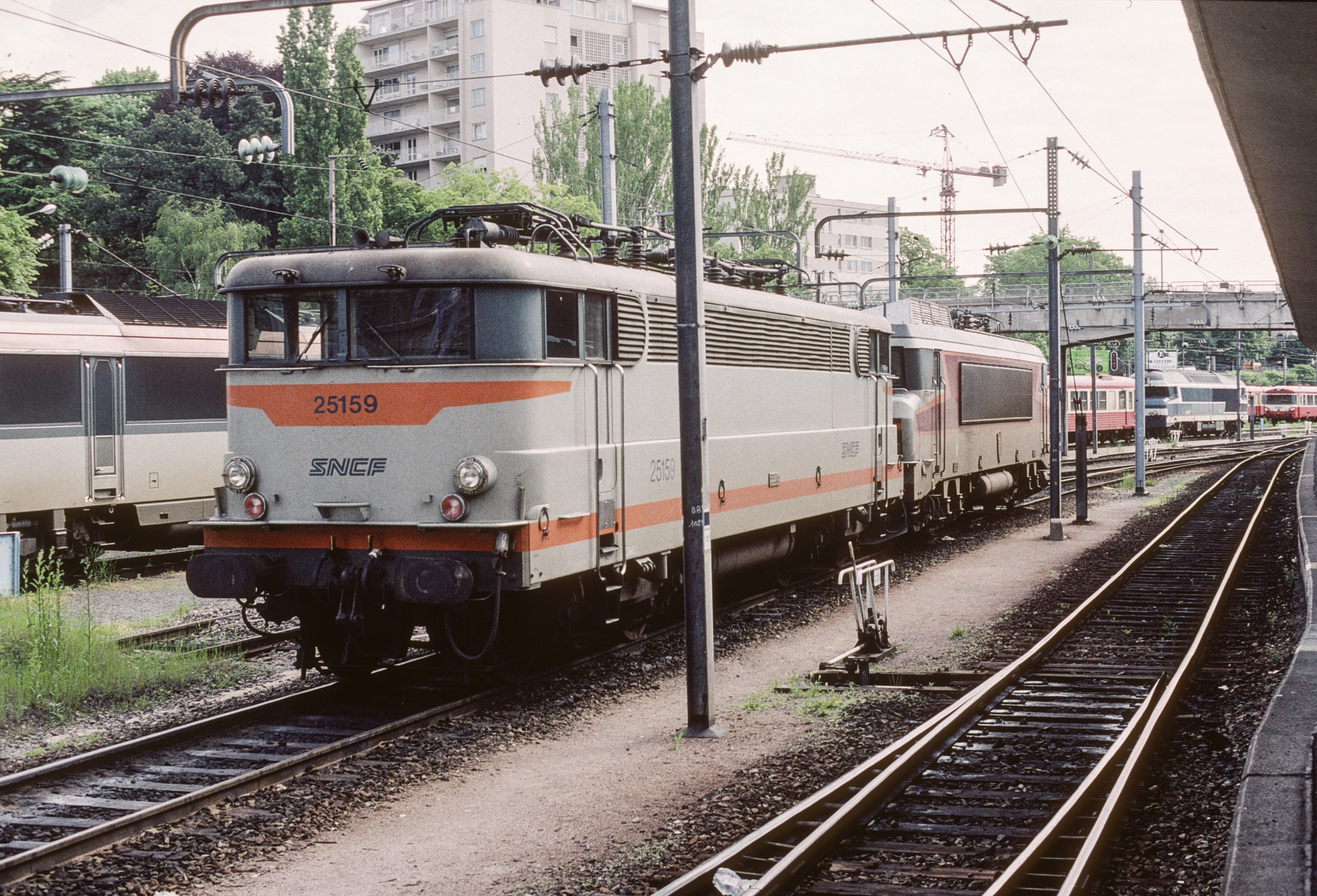
BB 25159 in Mulhouse, 1999

The locomotives were built in three batches. The first, of 20 units, was built between 1967 and 1968 and allocated to the depot at Chalindrey.These were numbered BB 25151–BB 25170. In 1974 a further 5 units, numbered BB 25171–BB 25175, were constructed and allocated to Chambéry. These were slightly longer and heavier than the first batch. Finally another 20, numbers BB 25176–BB 25195, were built between 1976 and 1977 and also allocated to Chambéry.

The Chambéry locomotives were principally used on the Bellegarde to Evian-les-Bains and Aix-les-Bains to Saint-Gervais-les-Bains services. In the winter sports season Chambéry would be allocated BB 25168 and BB 25169 from Chalindrey to assist with the extra traffic.

In 2009 the last members of the class were transferred to the depot at Vénissieux for use around Lyon.

== Disposal ==
In 2003, BB 25180, BB 25184, BB 25194 and BB 25195 were rebuilt to Class BB 25200. Withdrawals of the remainder started in 2003 and continued until December 2011. BB 25188 was reinstated in February 2012, finally being withdrawn in December 2013.

== Names ==
One member of the class, BB 25175, was named Le Creusot.

== Preservation ==
Two members of the class have been preserved, BB 25188 at Chambéry, and BB 25173 at Mini Rail Nantais.
