= Frontenex =

Frontenex Frontna (Arpitan)
- Commune
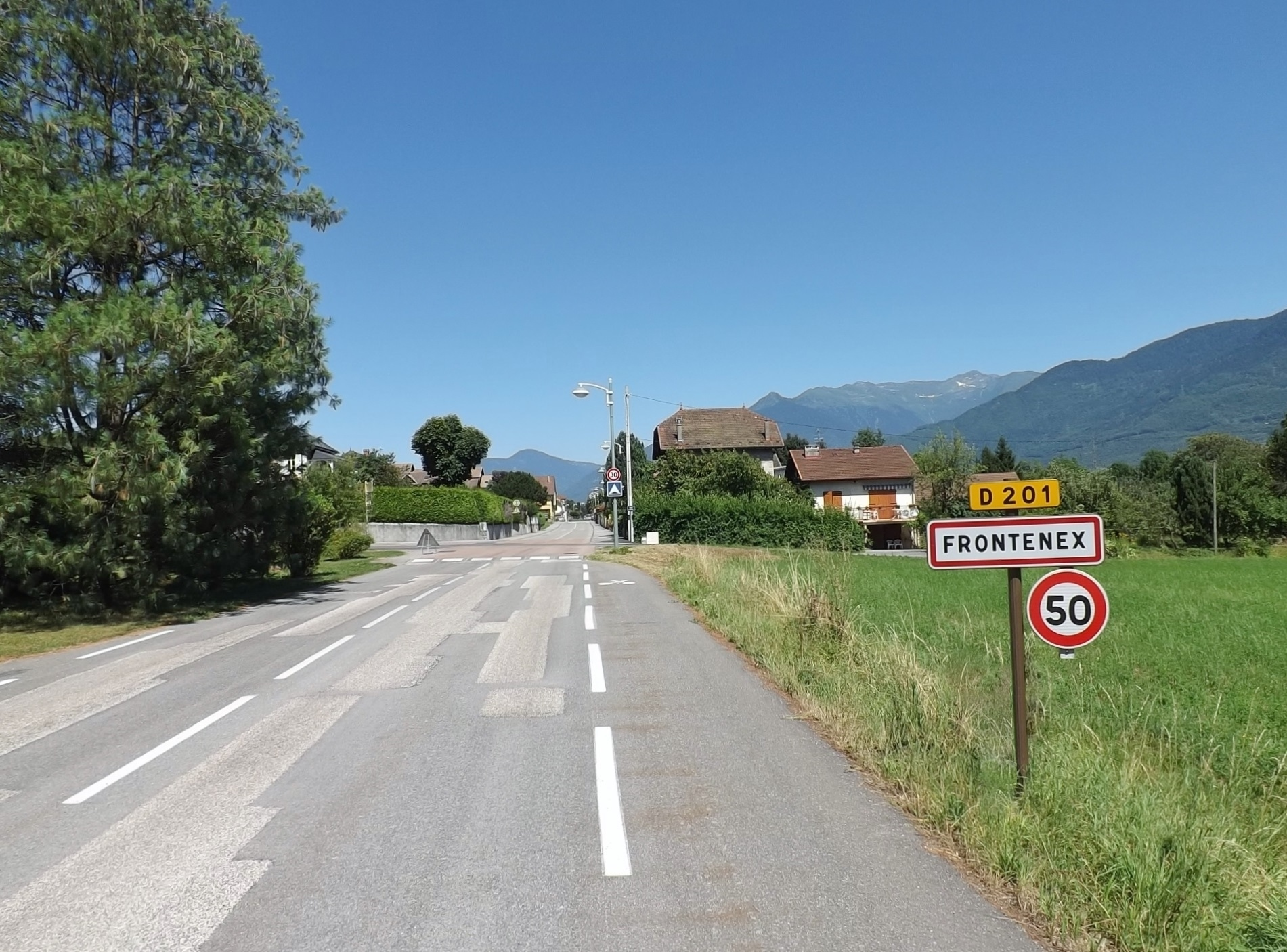
- The road into Frontenex
- Location of Frontenex
- Location within France Location within Auvergne-Rhône-Alpes
- Coordinates: 45°38′15″N 6°18′34″E
- Country: France
- Region: Auvergne-Rhône-Alpes
- Department: Savoie
- Arrondissement: Albertville
- Canton: Albertville-2
- Intercommunality: CA Arlysère

Government
  - Mayor (2020–2026): Claude Duray
- Area^{1}: 1.71 km^{2} (0.66 sq mi)
- Highest elevation: 467 m (1,532 ft)
- Lowest elevation: 308 m (1,010 ft)
- Population (2023): 1,912
  - Density: 1,120/km^{2} (2,900/sq mi)
- Time zone: UTC+01:00 (CET)
  - Summer (DST): UTC+02:00 (CEST)
- INSEE/Postal code: 73121 /73460
- ^{1} French Land Register data, which excludes lakes, ponds, glaciers > 1 km^{2} (0.386 sq mi or 247 acres) and river estuaries.

Frontenex (French pronunciation: [fʁɔ̃tnɛks]; Arpitan: Frontna) is a commune in the Savoie department in the Auvergne-Rhône-Alpes region in south-eastern France.

== Toponymy ==
As with many polysyllabic Arpitan toponyms or anthroponyms, the final -x marks oxytonic stress (on the last syllable), whereas the final -z indicates paroxytonic stress (on the penultimate syllable) and should not be pronounced, although in French it is often mispronounced due to hypercorrection.

== See also ==
- Communes of the Savoie department
