= Veynes =

- Commune
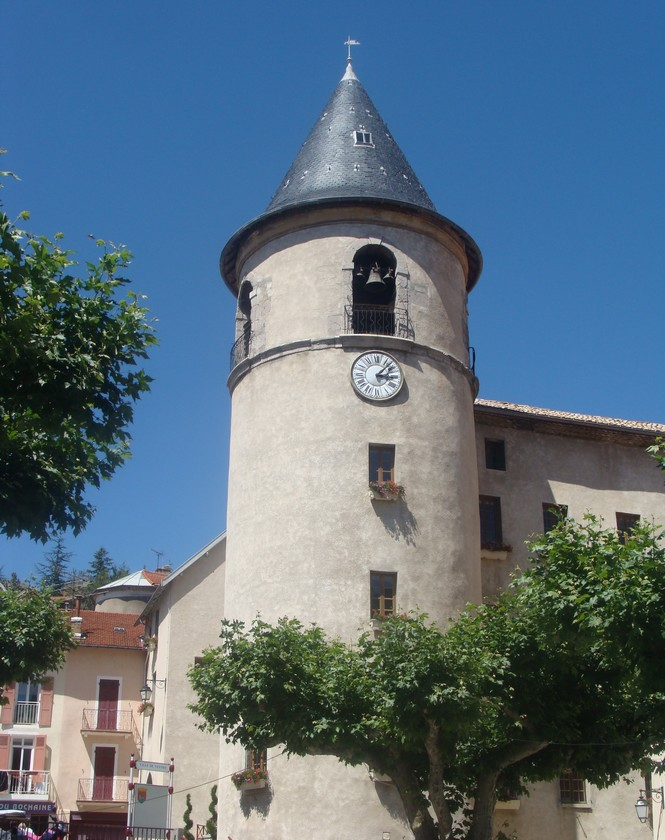
- Town hall

- Coat of arms
- Location of Veynes
- Location within France Location within Provence-Alpes-Côte d'Azur
- Coordinates: 44°32′06″N 5°49′27″E
- Country: France
- Region: Provence-Alpes-Côte d'Azur
- Department: Hautes-Alpes
- Arrondissement: Gap
- Canton: Veynes
- Intercommunality: Buëch-Dévoluy

Government
  - Mayor (2026–32): Christian Gilardeau-Truffinet
- Area^{1}: 42.6 km^{2} (16.4 sq mi)
- Elevation: 814 m (2,671 ft)
- Highest elevation: 1,815 m (5,955 ft)
- Lowest elevation: 771 m (2,530 ft)
- Population (2023): 3,214
  - Density: 75.4/km^{2} (195/sq mi)
- Time zone: UTC+01:00 (CET)
  - Summer (DST): UTC+02:00 (CEST)
- INSEE/Postal code: 05179 /05400
- ^{1} French Land Register data, which excludes lakes, ponds, glaciers > 1 km^{2} (0.386 sq mi or 247 acres) and river estuaries.

Veynes (French pronunciation: [vɛn]; Occitan: Vèina) is a commune in the Hautes-Alpes department in southeastern France. It developed largely as a minor rail hub, at the crossing of two lines.

== Population ==
Historical population
Year	Pop.	±% p.a.
1968	3,578	—
1975	3,330	−1.02%
1982	3,178	−0.67%
1990	3,148	−0.12%
1999	3,093	−0.20%
2007	3,170	+0.31%
2012	3,149	−0.13%
2017	3,182	+0.21%
2023	3,214	+0.17%
Source: INSEE

== See also ==
- Communes of the Hautes-Alpes department
