= Saint-Pierre-d'Albigny =

Saint-Pierre-d'Albigny Sè-Pyère (Savoyard)
- Commune
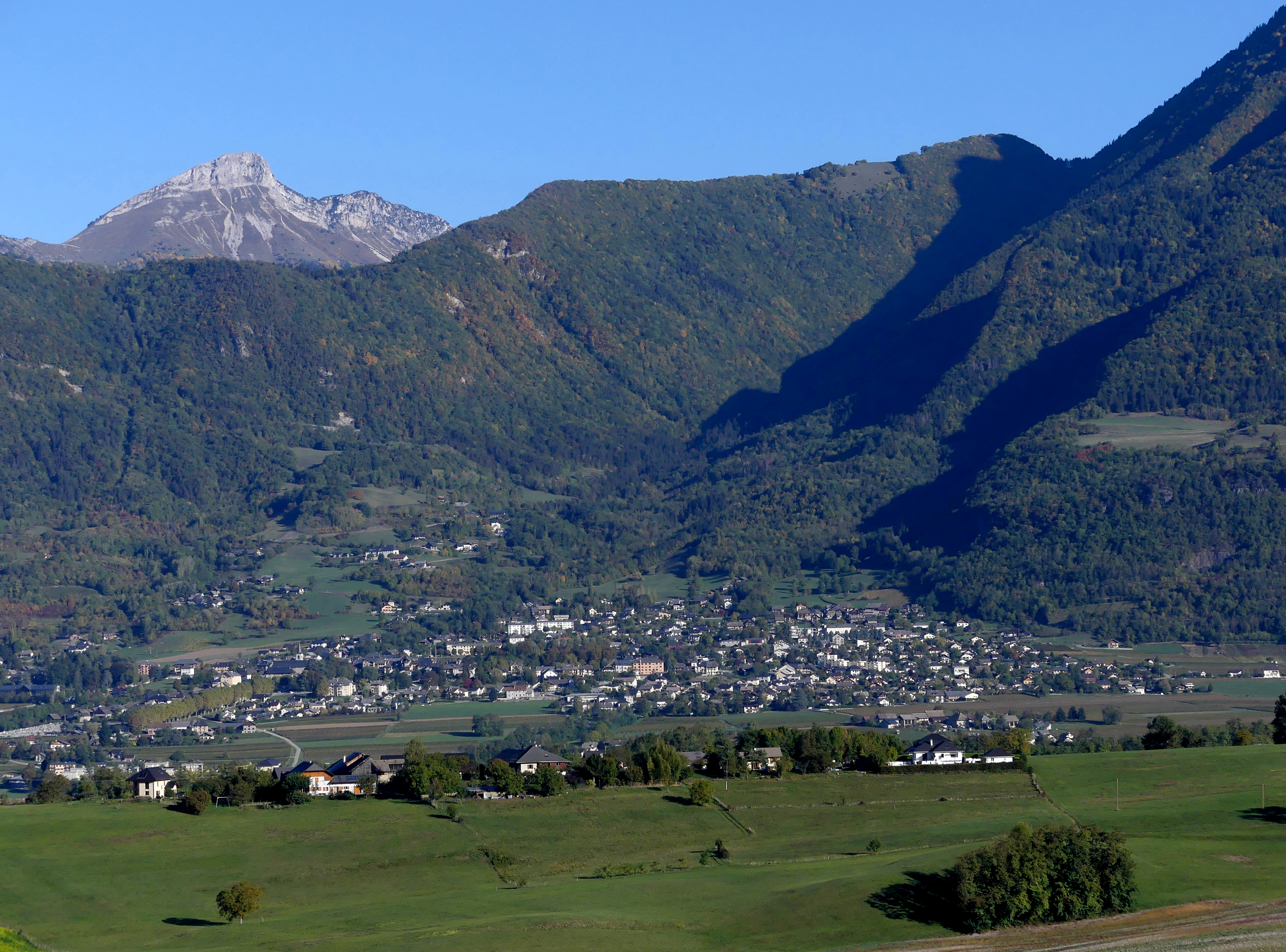
- Saint-Pierre-d'Albigny and Bauges Mountains

- Coat of arms
- Location of Saint-Pierre-d'Albigny
- Location within France Location within Auvergne-Rhône-Alpes
- Coordinates: 45°34′14″N 6°09′22″E
- Country: France
- Region: Auvergne-Rhône-Alpes
- Department: Savoie
- Arrondissement: Chambéry
- Canton: Saint-Pierre-d'Albigny

Government
  - Mayor (2020–2026): Michel Bouvier
- Area^{1}: 18.46 km^{2} (7.13 sq mi)
- Highest elevation: 2,037 m (6,683 ft)
- Lowest elevation: 275 m (902 ft)
- Population (2023): 4,217
  - Density: 228.4/km^{2} (591.7/sq mi)
- Time zone: UTC+01:00 (CET)
  - Summer (DST): UTC+02:00 (CEST)
- INSEE/Postal code: 73270 /73250
- Website: saintpierredalbigny.fr
- ^{1} French Land Register data, which excludes lakes, ponds, glaciers > 1 km^{2} (0.386 sq mi or 247 acres) and river estuaries.

Saint-Pierre-d'Albigny (French pronunciation: [sɛ̃ pjɛʁ dalbiɲi]; Savoyard: Sè-Pyère) is a commune in the Savoie department in the Auvergne-Rhône-Alpes region in south-eastern France.

== Population ==
Historical population
Year	Pop.	±% p.a.
1968	2,494	—
1975	2,518	+0.14%
1982	2,850	+1.79%
1990	3,151	+1.26%
1999	3,269	+0.41%
2007	3,678	+1.48%
2012	3,780	+0.55%
2017	3,943	+0.85%
2023	4,217	+1.13%
Source: INSEE

== See also ==
- Communes of the Savoie department
- Saint-Pierre-d'Albigny station
