= Briançon station =

Railway station in Briançon, France

Coordinates: 44°53′24″N 6°37′57″E

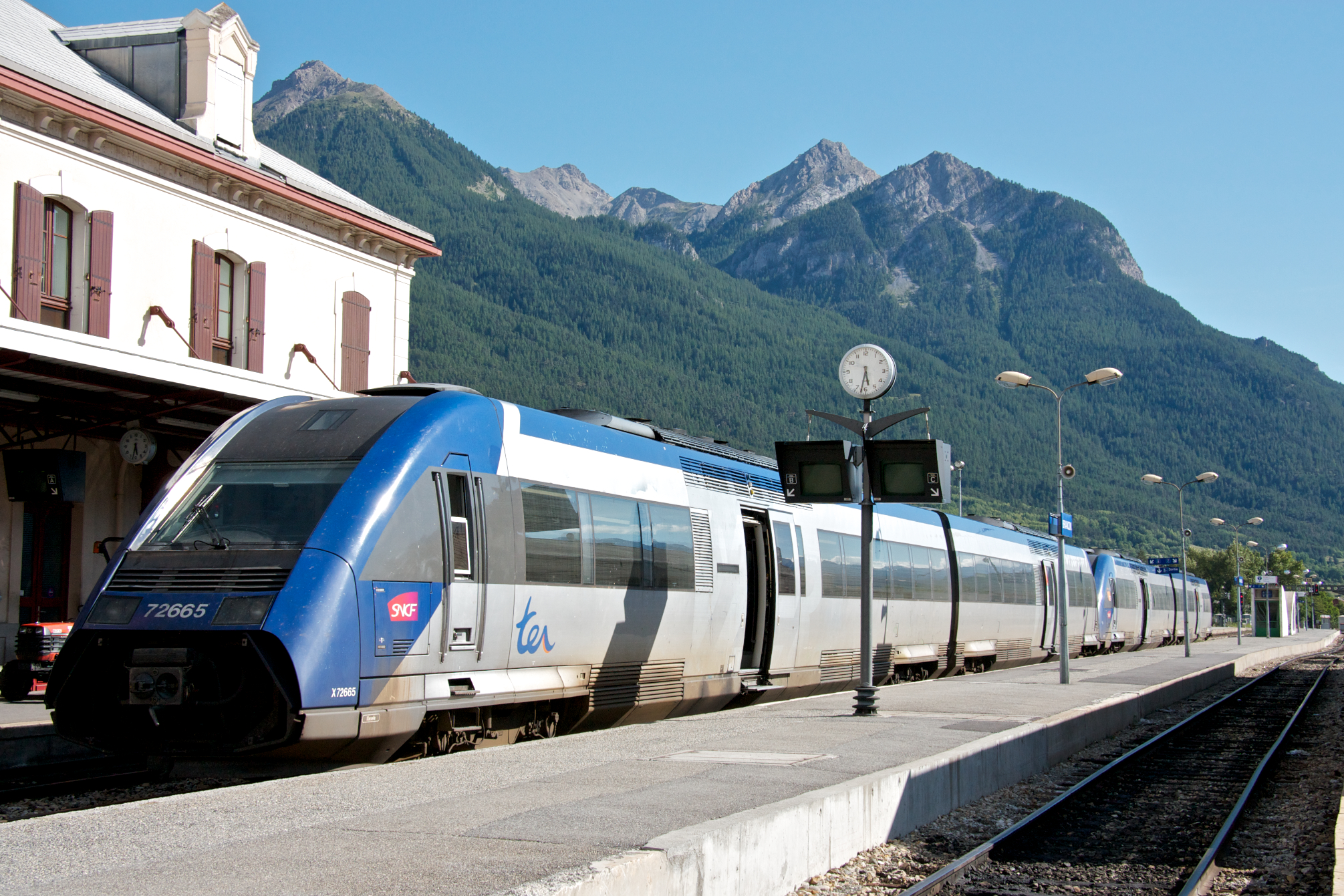
Briançon station

Briançon station (French: Gare de Briançon) is a French railway station serving the town Briançon, Hautes-Alpes department, southeastern France. It is the eastern terminus of the Veynes–Briançon railway.

== Train services ==
The following services call at Briançon:

- night services (Intercités de nuit) Paris - Gap - Briançon
- regional services (TER Auvergne-Rhône-Alpes) Valence - Gap - Briançon
- regional services (TER Provence-Alpes-Côte d'Azur) Marseille - Aix-en-Provence - Gap - Briançon

Preceding station	SNCF	Following station
L'Argentière-les Écrins towards Paris-Austerlitz	Intercités (night)	Terminus
Preceding station	TER Auvergne-Rhône-Alpes	Following station
L'Argentière-les Écrins towards Romans-Bourg-de-Péage	64	Terminus
Preceding station	TER PACA	Following station
Terminus	13	L'Argentière-les Écrins towards Marseille
