= Grenoble station =

Railway station in Grenoble, France

Grenoble
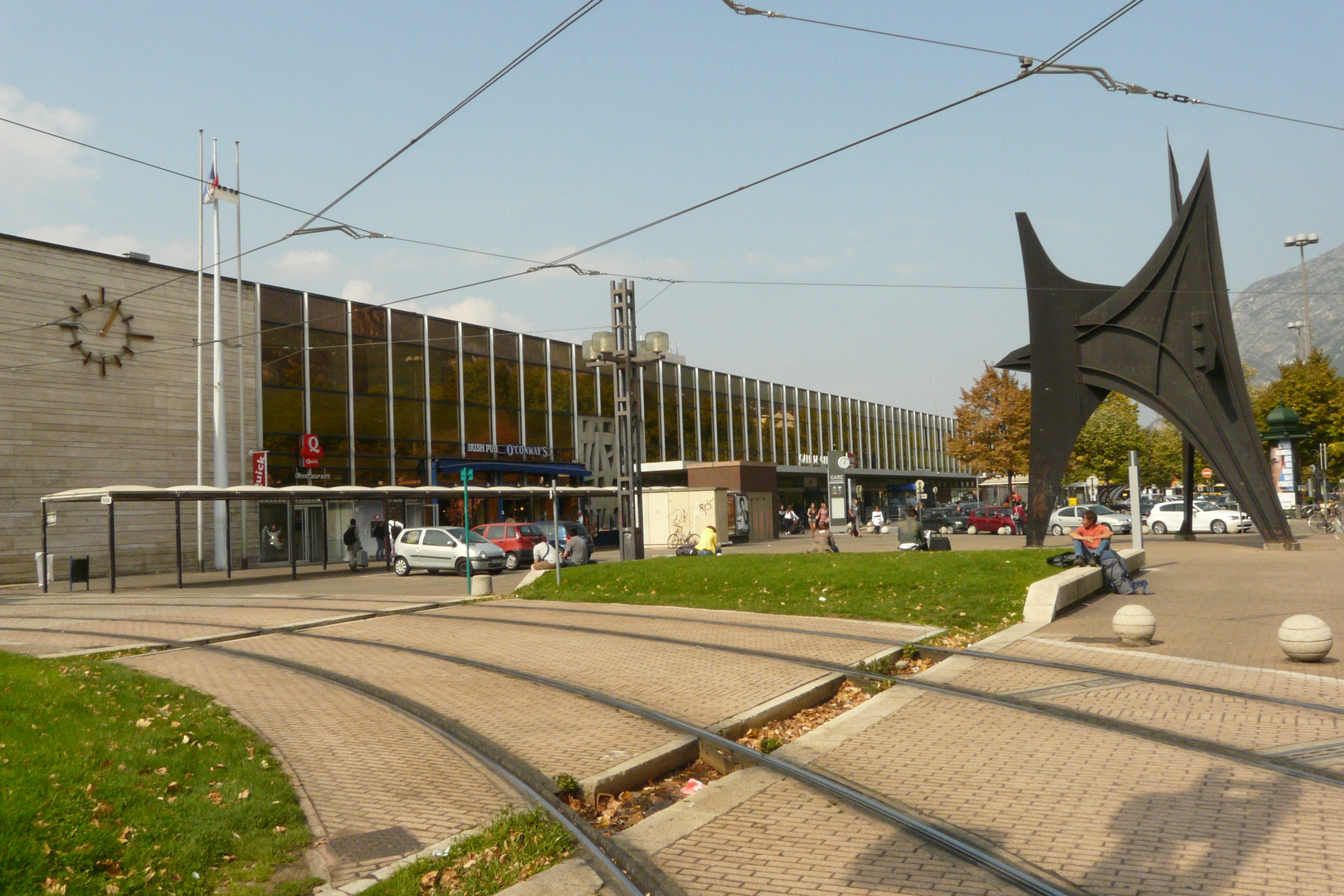
- Grenoble railway station

General information
- Location: Grenoble, Isère, Auvergne-Rhône-Alpes, France
- Coordinates: 45°11′27″N 5°42′53″E
- Lines: Lyon–Marseille (via Grenoble) railway Grenoble–Montmélian railway
- Platforms: 7
- Tracks: 7

History
- Opened: 1858

Passengers
- 2024: 8,776,384

Services
Preceding station	SNCF	Following station
Lyon-Saint-Exupéry TGV towards Paris-Lyon	TGV inOui	Terminus
Preceding station	Ouigo	Following station
Lyon Saint-Exupéry TGV towards Paris-Lyon	Grande Vitesse	Albertville towards Bourg-Saint-Maurice
Preceding station	TER Auvergne-Rhône-Alpes	Following station
Voiron towards Lyon-Part-Dieu	1	Terminus
Saint-Marcellin towards Valence	2	Grenoble-Universités-Gières towards Annecy or Geneva
Terminus	60	Échirolles towards Chambéry
Saint-Égrève-Saint-Robert towards Valence	61	Échirolles towards Grenoble-Universités-Gières
Voreppe towards Saint-André-le-Gaz	62	Échirolles towards Grenoble-Universités-Gières
Terminus	63	Pont-de-Claix towards Gap
Location

Grenoble is the main railway station located in Grenoble, Isère, France. The station was opened on 3 January 1849 and is located on the Lyon–Marseille (via Grenoble) railway and Grenoble–Montmélian railway. The train services are operated by SNCF.

The station was rebuilt in 1967 for the 1968 Winter Olympics. The station is currently undergoing reconstruction, which includes the electrification of the Valence-Grenoble route and the Grenoble-Chambéry route.

== Train services ==
The station is served by the following services:

- High speed services (TGV) Paris - Grenoble
- Regional services (TER Auvergne-Rhône-Alpes) Lyon - Bourgoin - La-Tour-du-Pin - Grenoble
- Regional services (TER Auvergne-Rhône-Alpes) Valence - Grenoble - Chambéry - Aix-les-Bains - Annecy
- Regional services (TER Auvergne-Rhône-Alpes) Valence - Grenoble - Chambéry - Aix-les-Bains - Bellegarde - Geneva
- Local services (TER Auvergne-Rhône-Alpes) Grenoble - Université - Montmélian - Chambéry
- Local services (TER Auvergne-Rhône-Alpes) Valence - Valence TGV - Romans-Bourg-de-Peage - St Marcellin - Moirans - Grenoble - Université
- Local services (TER Auvergne-Rhône-Alpes) St-André-le-Gaz - Voiron - Moirans - Grenoble - Université
- Local services (TER Auvergne-Rhône-Alpes) Grenoble - Monestier-de-Clermont - Veynes - Gap

== Tram services ==
- A (Fontaine - Gare - Centre Ville - Polesud - Échirolles - Denis Papin)
- B (Presqu'Île - Cité Internationale - Gare - Centre Ville - La Tronche - Universités - Gières)
- D (Les Taillées Universités - Étienne Grappe) (The expansion of this line is underway)
