= Montmélian =

Montmélian Monmélyan (Savoyard)
- Commune
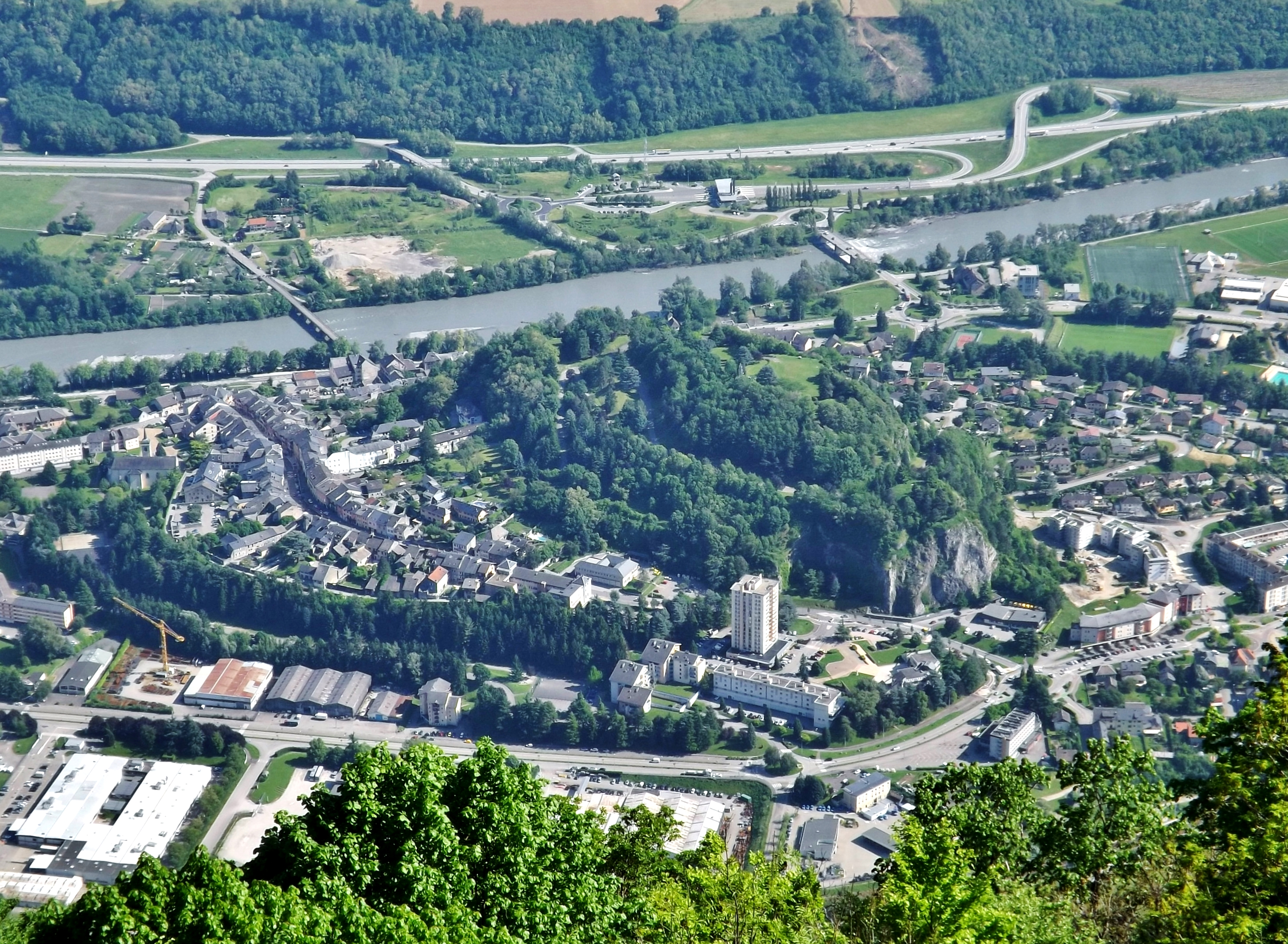
- A view of Montmélian from the nearby hillside

- Flag Coat of arms
- Location of Montmélian
- Location within France Location within Auvergne-Rhône-Alpes
- Coordinates: 45°30′12″N 6°03′15″E
- Country: France
- Region: Auvergne-Rhône-Alpes
- Department: Savoie
- Arrondissement: Chambéry
- Canton: Montmélian

Government
  - Mayor (2020–2026): Béatrice Santais (PS)
- Area^{1}: 5.69 km^{2} (2.20 sq mi)
- Elevation: 285 m (935 ft)
- Highest elevation: 1,200 m (3,900 ft)
- Lowest elevation: 256 m (840 ft)
- Population (2023): 4,024
  - Density: 707/km^{2} (1,830/sq mi)
- Time zone: UTC+01:00 (CET)
  - Summer (DST): UTC+02:00 (CEST)
- INSEE/Postal code: 73171 /73800
- Dialling codes: 0479
- Website: www.montmelian.com
- ^{1} French Land Register data, which excludes lakes, ponds, glaciers > 1 km^{2} (0.386 sq mi or 247 acres) and river estuaries.

Montmélian (French pronunciation: [mɔ̃meljɑ̃]; Savoyard: Monmélyan) is a commune in the Savoie department in the Auvergne-Rhône-Alpes region in south-eastern France. Montmélian station has rail connections to Grenoble, Modane, Bourg-Saint-Maurice and Chambéry.

== Geography ==
=== Climate ===
Montmélian has a humid subtropical climate (Köppen climate classification Cfa) closely bordering on an oceanic climate (Cfb). The average annual temperature in Montmélian is 12.4 °C (54.3 °F). The average annual rainfall is 987.3 mm (38.87 in) with December as the wettest month. The temperatures are highest on average in July, at around 22.0 °C (71.6 °F), and lowest in January, at around 3.0 °C (37.4 °F). The highest temperature ever recorded in Montmélian was 39.8 °C (103.6 °F) on 7 July 2015; the coldest temperature ever recorded was −14.5 °C (5.9 °F) on 27 November 2005.

Climate data for Montmélian (1991−2020 normals, extremes 2003−present)
Month	Jan	Feb	Mar	Apr	May	Jun	Jul	Aug	Sep	Oct	Nov	Dec	Year
Record high °C (°F)	19.5 (67.1)	20.8 (69.4)	25.5 (77.9)	30.0 (86.0)	34.2 (93.6)	37.0 (98.6)	39.8 (103.6)	38.6 (101.5)	32.6 (90.7)	30.4 (86.7)	24.3 (75.7)	19.1 (66.4)	39.8 (103.6)
Mean daily maximum °C (°F)	6.6 (43.9)	8.7 (47.7)	13.6 (56.5)	18.8 (65.8)	21.6 (70.9)	26.0 (78.8)	28.6 (83.5)	27.4 (81.3)	23.5 (74.3)	18.4 (65.1)	11.7 (53.1)	7.0 (44.6)	17.7 (63.9)
Daily mean °C (°F)	3.0 (37.4)	4.3 (39.7)	8.2 (46.8)	12.6 (54.7)	15.9 (60.6)	19.9 (67.8)	22.0 (71.6)	21.1 (70.0)	17.6 (63.7)	13.2 (55.8)	7.4 (45.3)	3.4 (38.1)	12.4 (54.3)
Mean daily minimum °C (°F)	−0.7 (30.7)	−0.1 (31.8)	2.8 (37.0)	6.5 (43.7)	10.1 (50.2)	13.8 (56.8)	15.3 (59.5)	14.7 (58.5)	11.7 (53.1)	8.1 (46.6)	3.2 (37.8)	−0.1 (31.8)	7.1 (44.8)
Record low °C (°F)	−12.0 (10.4)	−13.3 (8.1)	−7.8 (18.0)	−3.9 (25.0)	0.6 (33.1)	4.4 (39.9)	8.3 (46.9)	7.4 (45.3)	3.2 (37.8)	−2.3 (27.9)	−14.5 (5.9)	−12.7 (9.1)	−14.5 (5.9)
Average precipitation mm (inches)	92.2 (3.63)	63.7 (2.51)	82.1 (3.23)	60.8 (2.39)	99.5 (3.92)	84.6 (3.33)	81.5 (3.21)	92.9 (3.66)	59.8 (2.35)	74.9 (2.95)	87.8 (3.46)	107.5 (4.23)	987.3 (38.87)
Average precipitation days (≥ 1.0 mm)	9.7	7.5	9.8	8.0	10.8	9.5	7.6	8.7	6.8	8.5	8.4	10.4	105.5
Source: Météo-France

== Population ==
Historical population of Montmélian

Year	Pop.	±%
1793	985	—
1800	1,165	+18.3%
1806	1,259	+8.1%
1822	1,200	−4.7%
1838	1,325	+10.4%
1848	1,302	−1.7%
1858	1,192	−8.4%
1861	1,540	+29.2%
1866	1,159	−24.7%
1872	1,141	−1.6%
1876	1,117	−2.1%
1881	1,274	+14.1%
1886	1,270	−0.3%
1891	1,358	+6.9%
1896	969	−28.6%
1901	1,093	+12.8%
1906	1,156	+5.8%

Year	Pop.	±%
1911	1,084	−6.2%
1921	845	−22.0%
1926	977	+15.6%
1931	1,034	+5.8%
1936	1,065	+3.0%
1946	1,084	+1.8%
1954	1,233	+13.7%
1962	1,583	+28.4%
1968	2,517	+59.0%
1975	3,585	+42.4%
1982	4,016	+12.0%
1990	3,930	−2.1%
1999	3,926	−0.1%
2007	3,933	+0.2%
2012	3,991	+1.5%
2017	4,123	+3.3%
2023	4,024	−2.4%

Source: Ehess and INSEE

== See also ==
- Communes of the Savoie department
