= TER Auvergne-Rhône-Alpes =

French regional transport network

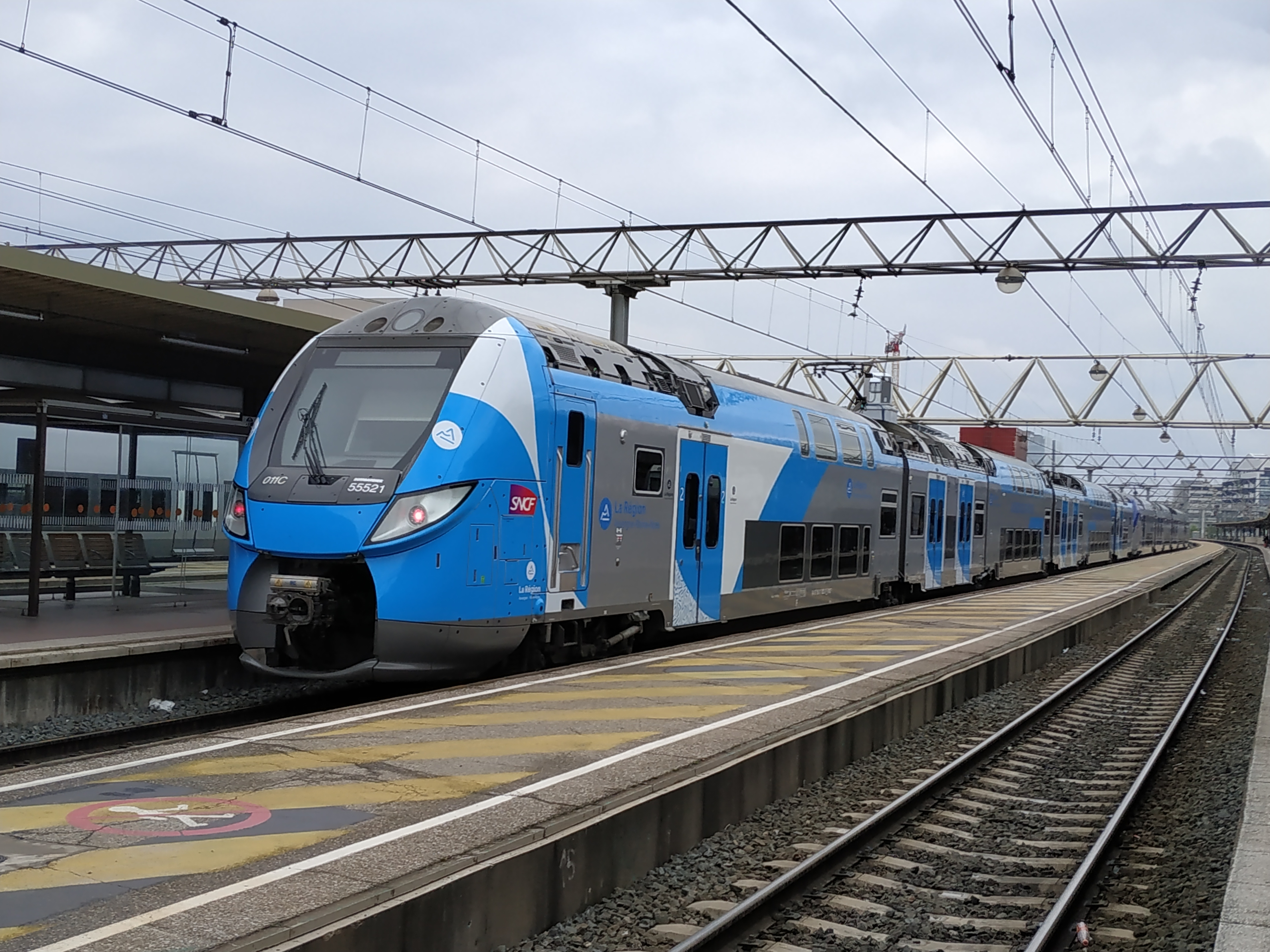
- Regio 2N (train unit Z 55521/22), in TER Auvergne-Rhône-Alpes branding at Lyon-Part-Dieu station.

Overview
- Area served: Auvergne-Rhône-Alpes
- Line number: 76
- Number of stations: 335

Operation
- Began operation: 2016

TER Auvergne-Rhône-Alpes is the regional rail network serving the region of Auvergne-Rhône-Alpes, central and eastern France. It is operated by the French national railway company SNCF. It was formed in 2017 from the previous TER networks TER Auvergne and TER Rhône-Alpes, after the respective regions were merged.

== Network ==
The northeastern part of the region is also served by the Léman Express network. The TER Auvergne-Rhône-Alpes rail and bus network as of April 2022:

Rail transport infrastructure map of Auvergne-Rhône-Alpes, showing main stations, number of tracks, power source and maximum speed.

=== Rail ===
Line	Route
1	Lyon-Perrache/Part-Dieu ... Bourgoin-Jallieu ... Saint-André-le-Gaz ... Voiron – Grenoble
2	(Switzerland) Genève-Cornavin – Bellegarde – Aix-les-Bains-Le Revard – Chambéry-Challes-les-Eaux ... Grenoble ... Valence branch line Annecy ... Aix-les-Bains-Le Revard
3	Lyon-Part-Dieu ... Ambérieu ... Bellegarde ... Annemasse ... La Roche-sur-Foron ... Saint-Gervais-les-Bains-Le Fayet branch line Bellegarde – (Switzerland) Genève-Cornavin branch line Annemasse ... Évian-les-Bains
4	Lyon-Part-Dieu – Ambérieu – Aix-les-Bains-Le Revard – Rumilly – Annecy
5	Lyon-Vaise – Lyon-Perrache ... Vienne ... Valence ... Montélimar ... Avignon (see TER Provence-Alpes-Côte-d'Azur line 10 for connection Lyon – Avignon – Marseille)
6	Clermont-Ferrand – Riom-Châtel-Guyon – Vichy – Roanne ... Tarare ... Lozanne ... Lyon-Perrache
8	Clermont-Ferrand ... Brioude ... Langeac ... Alès ... Nîmes (see TER Occitanie line 27 for details)
9	Le Puy-en-Velay ... Firminy ... Saint-Étienne
10	Saint-Étienne ... Givors-Ville ... Lyon-Perrache
11	Clermont-Ferrand ... Thiers and Boën ... Montbrison ... Saint-Étienne
12	Roanne ... Feurs ... Saint-Étienne
14 (7, 15)	Nevers ... Moulins-sur-Allier – Bessay† – Varennes-sur-Allier – Saint-Germain-des-Fossés – Vichy – Riom-Châtel-Guyon – Clermont-Ferrand
16	Montluçon ... Commentry ... Gannat – Aigueperse – Aubiat† – Pontmort† – Riom-Châtel-Guyon – Gerzat† – Clermont-Ferrand
17	Bourges ... Montluçon (see TER Centre-Val de Loire line 4.1 for details)
21	Brignais ... Écully-la-Demi-Lune ... Lyon-Saint-Paul
22	Sain-Bel – L'Arbresle ... Tassin ... Lyon-Saint-Paul
23	Lozanne ... Tassin
24	Mâcon-Ville ... Villefranche-sur-Saône ... Saint-Germain-au-Mont-d'Or ... Lyon-Perrache/Part-Dieu
26 (80)	Clermont-Ferrand – Clermont-La Pardieu – Sarliève-Cournon† – Le Cendre-Orcet – Les Martres-de-Veyre† – Vic-le-Comte† – Parent-Coudes-Champeix† – Issoire ... Brioude ... Saint-Georges-d'Aurac ... Le Puy-en-Velay
30	Mâcon-Ville ... Bourg-en-Bresse ... Ambronay—Priay – Ambérieu
31 (38)	Bourg-en-Bresse ... Cize—Bolozon station – Nurieux – Brion—Montréal-la-Cluse – Bellignat – Oyonnax
32	Bourg-en-Bresse ... Villars-les-Dombes ... Lyon
35	Lyon-Part-Dieu ... Ambérieu ... Culoz ... Chambéry-Challes-les-Eaux
43	Annecy ... La Roche-sur-Foron ... Saint-Gervais-les-Bains-Le Fayet
44	Saint-Gervais-les-Bains-Le Fayet ... Chamonix-Mont-Blanc ... Vallorcine
50	Annecy ... Aix-les-Bains-Le Revard ... Chambéry-Challes-les-Eaux
51	Genève-Cornavin – Bellegarde ... Culoz ... Chambéry-Challes-les-Eaux
52	Chambéry-Challes-les-Eaux – Montmélian – Saint-Pierre-d'Albigny – Grésy-sur-Isère – Frontenex – Albertville – Notre-Dame-de-Briançon – Moûtiers-Salins-Brides-les-Bains – Aime-La Plagne – Landry – Bourg-Saint-Maurice
53	Chambéry-Challes-les-Eaux ... Saint-Pierre-d'Albigny ... Saint-Jean-de-Maurienne ... Modane
54	Lyon-Part-Dieu ... Bourgoin-Jallieu ... Chambéry-Challes-les-Eaux
60	Chambéry-Challes-les-Eaux ... Grenoble
61 (70)	Grenoble-Universités-Gières ... Grenoble ... Saint-Marcellin ... Romans-Bourg-de-Péage – Valence TGV – Valence
62	Saint-André-le-Gaz ... Voiron ... Grenoble
63	Grenoble ... Veynes-Dévoluy ... Gap
64	Romans-Bourg-de-Péage ... Valence ... Die ... Veynes-Dévoluy ... Gap ... Briançon
65	Clermont-Ferrand ... Issoire ... Neussargues ... Aurillac
67	Brive-la-Gaillarde – Turenne† – Les Quatre-Routes† – Saint-Denis-près-Martel – Vayrac† – Bétaille† – Puybrun† – Bretenoux-Biars – Laval-de-Cère – Laroquebrou – Aurillac
84	Clermont-Ferrand – Clermont-La Rotonde – Royat-Chamalières – Durtol-Nohanent – Volvic
† Not all trains call at this station

=== Bus ===
Line	Bus route
13	Roanne – Le Creusot TGV
18	Montluçon – Vichy
19	Arlanc – Ambert – Thiers – Vichy
20	Paray-le-Monial – Lamure-sur-Azergues – Lozanne
25	Villefranche-sur-Saône – Mâcon TGV
27	Le Puy-en-Velay – La Chaise-Dieu – Ambert
28	Dunières – Firminy
33	Bellegarde-sur-Valserine – Divonne-les-Bains
36	Bellegarde-sur-Valserine – Nurieux
66	Neussargues – Saint-Flour
68	Clermont-Ferrand – Bort-les-Orgues – Mauriac
69	Neussargues – Riom-ès-Montagnes – Bort-les-Orgues
71	Nyons – Montélimar
73	Aubenas – Privas – Valence
74	Les Vans – Aubenas – Montélimar – Valence
75	Annonay – Le Péage-de-Roussillon – Lyon
76	Vallon-Pont-d'Arc – Montélimar – Valence
83	Clermont-Ferrand – Ambert
83	Clermont-Ferrand – Le Mont-Dore
84	Montluçon – Saint-Éloy-les-Mines – Clermont-Ferrand
90	Communay – Sérézin
91	Saint-Priest – Saint-Pierre-de-Chandieu

== See also ==
- Réseau Ferré de France
- List of SNCF stations in Auvergne-Rhône-Alpes
