= Chambéry–Challes-les-Eaux station =

Railway station in Chambéry, France

Coordinates: 45°34′17″N 5°55′10″E

Chambéry–Challes-les-Eaux
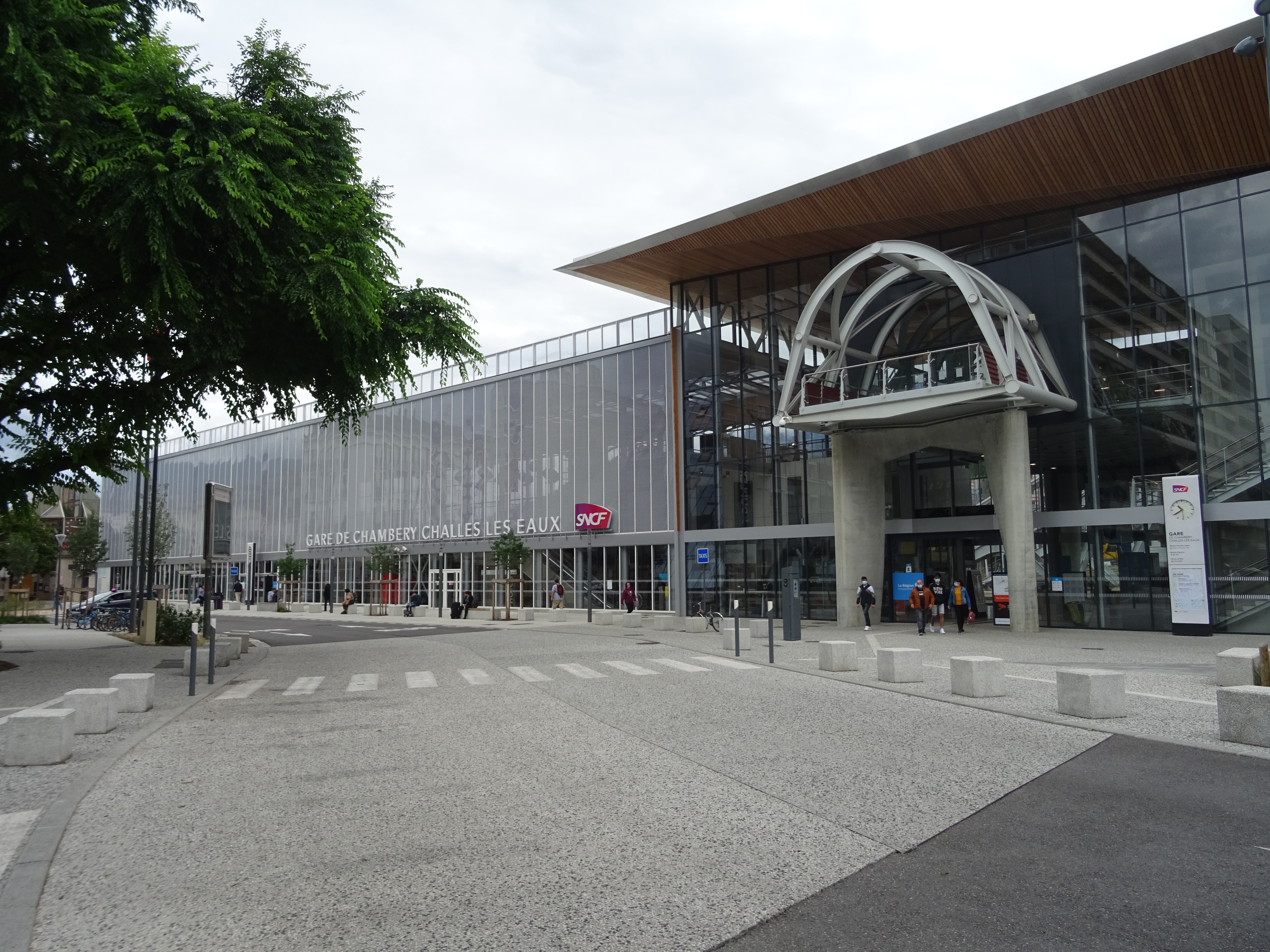
- Main entrance

General information
- Location: Chambéry, Savoie, Auvergne-Rhône-Alpes; France
- Elevation: 270 m (890 ft)
- Owner: SNCF
- Operator: SNCF
- Lines: Culoz–Modane railway Saint-André-le-Gaz-Chambéry railway
- Platforms: 3
- Tracks: 6

Other information
- Station code: 87741009

History
- Opened: 21 October 1856; 169 years ago

Passengers
- 2024: 5,105,918
Services
Preceding station	SNCF	Following station
Lyon-Saint-Exupéry TGV towards Paris-Lyon	TGV inOui	Saint-Jean-de-Maurienne towards Milan
Lyon-Saint-Exupéry TGV towards Paris-Lyon	TGV inOui	Albertville towards Bourg-Saint-Maurice
Lyon-Saint-Exupéry TGV towards Paris-Lyon	TGV inOui	Aix-les-Bains-Le Revard towards Annecy
Grenoble towards Paris-Lyon	TGV inOui	Aix-les-Bains-Le Revard towards Annecy
Preceding station	Eurostar	Following station
Brussels-South towards Amsterdam Centraal	Eurostar (winter)	Albertville towards Bourg-Saint-Maurice
Preceding station	Trenitalia	Following station
Lyon-Part-Dieu towards Paris-Lyon	Frecciarossa	Saint-Jean-de-Maurienne towards Milano Centrale
Preceding station	TER Auvergne-Rhône-Alpes	Following station
Montmélian towards Valence	2	Aix-les-Bains-Le Revard towards Annecy or Geneva
Aix-les-Bains-Le Revard towards Lyon-Part-Dieu	35	Terminus
Aix-les-Bains-Le Revard towards Annecy	50	Terminus
Terminus	51	Viviers-du-Lac towards Geneva
Terminus	52	Montmélian towards Bourg-Saint-Maurice
Terminus	53	Montmélian towards Modane
Aiguebelette-le-Lac towards Lyon-Part-Dieu	54	Terminus
Montmélian towards Grenoble	60	Terminus
Location
- Location within France Location within Europe

Chambéry–Challes-les-Eaux station (French: Gare de Chambéry–Challes-les-Eaux) is a railway station in the Savoie département of France. The station serves the city of Chambéry. The station is served by three major high speed services, the TGV, Eurostar and Frecciarossa.

== Train services ==
The station is served by the following services:

- High speed services (TGV) Paris - Lyon - Chambéry - Turin - Milan
- High speed services (TGV) Paris - Chambéry - Aix-les-Bains - Annecy
- High speed services (TGV) Annecy - Chambéry - Grenoble - Valence - Avignon - Marseille
- High speed services (TGV) Paris - Chambéry - Albertville - Bourg-Saint-Maurice (Winter)
- High speed services (Frecciarossa) Paris - Lyon - Chambéry - Turin - Milan
- High speed service (Eurostar) Amsterdam - Rotterdam - Antwerp - Brussels - Chambéry - Bourg-Saint-Maurice (Winter)
- Regional services (TER Auvergne-Rhône-Alpes) Valence - Grenoble - Chambéry - Aix-les-Bains - Annecy
- Regional services (TER Auvergne-Rhône-Alpes) Valence - Grenoble - Chambéry - Aix-les-Bains - Bellegarde - Geneva
- Local services (TER Auvergne-Rhône-Alpes) Grenoble - Université - Montmélian - Chambéry

The station is an intermediate stop on the Milan–Paris Frecciarossa operated by Trenitalia France.
