= List of SNCF stations in Auvergne-Rhône-Alpes =

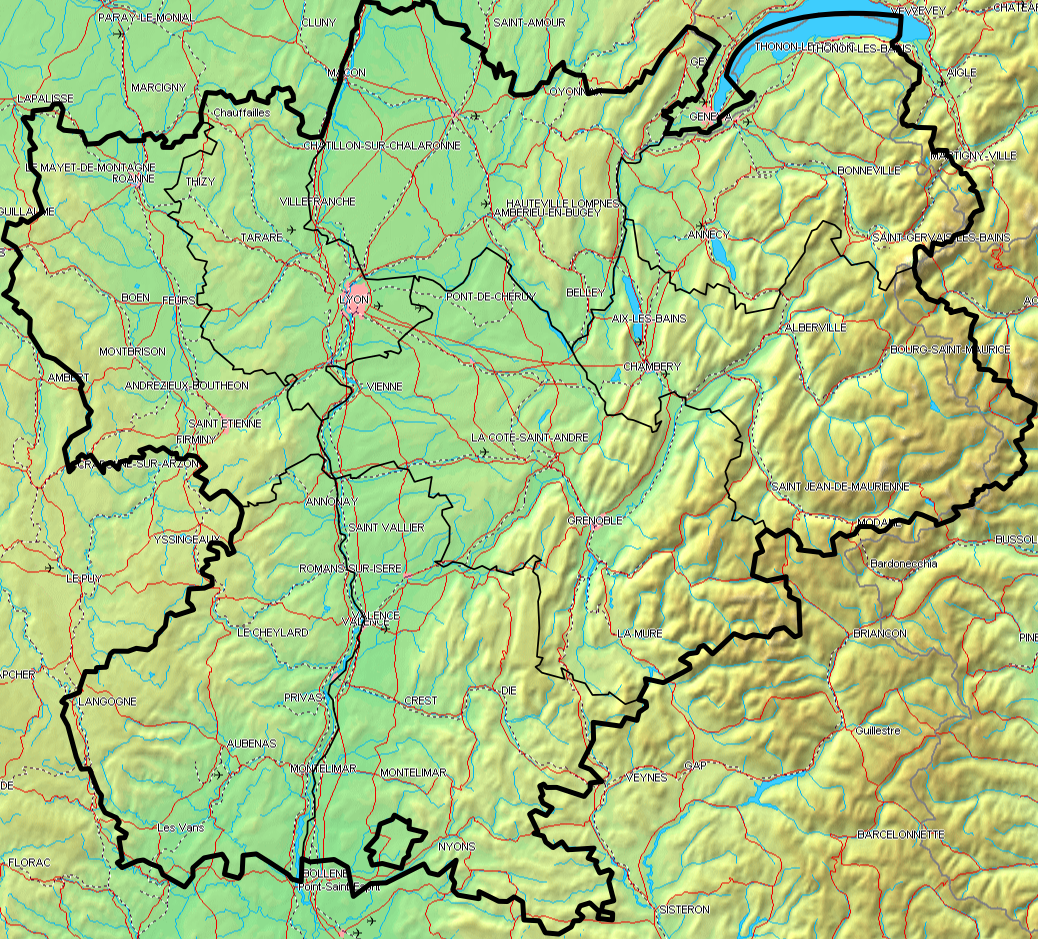
Map of railway lines in Rhône-Alpes

This article contains a list of current SNCF railway stations in the Auvergne-Rhône-Alpes region of France, sorted by department.

== Ain (01) ==
- Ambérieu
- Ambronay—Priay
- Bellegarde
- Bellignat
- Beynost
- Bourg-en-Bresse
- Brion—Montréal-la-Cluse
- Ceyzériat
- Cize—Bolozon
- Culoz
- Les Échets
- Marlieux—Châtillon
- Meximieux—Pérouges
- Mézériat
- Mionnay
- Miribel
- Montluel
- Nurieux
- Oyonnax
- Polliat
- Pont-d'Ain
- Pont-de-Veyle
- Pougny—Chancy
- Saint-André-de-Courcy
- Saint-Marcel-en-Dombes
- Saint-Martin-du-Mont
- Saint-Maurice-de-Beynost
- Saint-Paul-de-Varax
- Saint-Rambert-en-Bugey
- Servas-Lent
- Seyssel-Corbonod
- Simandre-sur-Suran
- Tenay-Hauteville
- La Valbonne
- Villars-les-Dombes
- Villereversure
- Virieu-le-Grand-Belley
- Vonnas

== Allier (03) ==
- Bellenaves
- Bessay
- Commentry
- Dompierre-Sept-Fons
- Gannat
- Huriel
- Louroux-de-Bouble
- Magnette
- Montluçon-Rimard
- Montluçon-Ville
- Moulins-sur-Allier
- Saint-Bonnet-de-Rochefort
- Saint-Germain-des-Fossés
- Les Trillers
- Urçay
- Vallon
- Varennes-sur-Allier
- Vichy
- La Ville-Gozet
- Villeneuve-sur-Allier

== Ardèche (07) ==
No passenger stations

== Cantal (15) ==
- Aurillac
- Boisset
- Lacapelle-Viescamp
- Laroquebrou
- Le Lioran
- Massiac
- Maurs
- Murat
- Neussargues
- Pers
- Saint-Flour-Chaudes-Aigues
- Vic-sur-Cère
- Viescamp-sous-Jallès
- Ytrac

== Drôme (26) ==
- Crest
- Die
- Donzère
- Livron
- Loriol
- Luc-en-Diois
- Lus-la-Croix-Haute
- Montélimar
- Pierrelatte
- Romans-Bourg-de-Péage
- Saillans
- Saint-Rambert-d'Albon
- Saint-Vallier-sur-Rhône
- Tain-Hermitage-Tournon
- Valence TGV
- Valence-Ville

== Isère (38) ==
- Les Abrets-Fitilieu
- Beaucroissant
- Bourgoin-Jallieu
- Brignoud
- Cessieu
- Châbons
- Chasse-sur-Rhône
- Clelles-Mens
- Echirolles
- Estressin
- Goncelin
- Le Grand-Lemps
- Grenoble
- Grenoble-Universités-Gières
- L'Isle-d'Abeau
- Jarrie-Vizille
- Lancey
- Moirans
- Moirans-Galifette
- Monestier-de-Clermont
- Le Péage-de-Roussillon
- Poliénas
- Pontcharra-sur-Breda
- Pont-de-Beauvoisin
- Pont-de-Claix
- Réaumont-Saint-Cassien
- Rives
- Saint-André-le-Gaz
- Saint-Clair-Les Roches
- Saint-Égrève-Saint-Robert
- Saint-Georges-de-Commiers
- Saint-Hilaire-Saint-Nazaire
- Saint-Marcellin
- Saint-Quentin-Fallavier
- La Tour-du-Pin
- Tullins-Fures
- La Verpillière
- Vienne
- Vif
- Vinay
- Virieu-sur-Bourbre
- Voiron
- Voreppe

== Loire (42) ==
- Andrézieux
- Balbigny
- Boën
- Bonson
- Bouthéon
- Le Chambon-Feugerolles
- Le Coteau
- Feurs
- Firminy
- La Fouillouse
- Fraisse-Unieux
- Montbrison
- Montrond-les-Bains
- Noirétable
- Régny
- La Ricamarie
- Rive-de-Gier
- Roanne
- Saint-Chamond
- Saint-Étienne-Bellevue
- Saint-Étienne-Carnot
- Saint-Étienne-Châteaucreux
- Saint-Étienne-La Terrasse
- Saint-Étienne-Le Clapier
- Saint-Galmier-Veauche
- Saint-Jodard
- Saint-Romain-le-Puy
- Saint-Victor-Thizy
- Sury-le-Comtal

== Haute-Loire (43) ==
- Alleyras
- Arvant
- Aurec
- Bas-Monistrol
- Brioude
- Chamalières
- Darsac
- Lachaud-Curmilhac
- Langeac
- Lavoûte-sur-Loire
- Monistriol-d'Allier
- Paulhaguet
- Pont-de-Lignon
- Le Puy-en-Velay
- Retournac
- Saint-Georges-d'Aurac
- Saint-Vincent-le-Château
- Vorey

== Lyon Metropolis (69) ==
- Alaï
- Albigny–Neuville
- Casino-Lacroix-Laval
- Charbonnières-les-Bains
- Collonges-Fontaines
- Couzon-au-Mont-d'or
- Crépieux-la-Pape
- Dardilly-le-Jubin
- Dardilly-les-Mouilles
- Écully-la-Demi-Lune
- Feyzin
- Les Flachères
- Francheville
- Givors-Canal
- Givors-Ville
- Grigny-le-Sablon
- Irigny-Yvours
- Lyon-Gorge-de-Loup
- Lyon-Jean Macé
- Lyon-Part-Dieu
- Lyon-Perrache
- Lyon-Saint-Paul
- Lyon-Vaise
- Le Méridien
- Oullins
- Pierre-Bénite
- Quincieux
- Saint-Fons
- Saint-Germain-au-Mont-d'Or
- Saint-Priest
- Sathonay-Rillieux
- Tassin
- La Tour-de-Salvagny
- Vénissieux
- Vernaison

== Puy-de-Dôme (63) ==
- Aigueperse
- Aubiat
- Aulnat-Aéroport
- La Bourboule
- Brassac-les-Mines-Sainte-Florine
- Le Breuil-sur-Couze
- Le Cendre-Orcet
- Clermont-Ferrand
- Clermont-La Pardieu
- Clermont-La Rotonde
- Durtol-Nohanent
- Gerzat
- Issoire
- Lapeyrouse
- Laqueuille
- Lezoux
- Les Martres-de-Veyre
- La Miouze-Rochefort
- Le Mont-Dore
- Parent-Coudes-Champeix
- Pont-de-Dore
- Pont-du-Château
- Pontgibaud
- Pontmort
- Riom-Châtel-Guyon
- Royat-Chamalières
- Sarliève-Cournon
- Thiers
- Le Vauriat
- Vertaizon
- Vic-le-Comte
- Volvic

== Rhône (69) ==
- Amplepuis
- Anse
- L'Arbresle
- Belleville-sur-Saône
- Bois-d'Oingt-Legny
- Brignais
- Chamelet
- Chaponost
- Châtillon-d'Azergues
- Chazay-Marcilly
- Chessy
- Civrieux-d'Azergues
- Dommartin-Lissieu
- Fleurieux-sur-l'Arbresle
- Lamure-sur-Azergues
- Lentilly
- Lentilly-Charpenay
- Lozanne
- Lyon-Saint-Exupéry TGV
- Pontcharra-Saint-Forgeux
- Sain-Bel
- Saint-Georges-de-Reneins
- Saint-Romain-de-Popey
- Sérézin
- Tarare
- Villefranche-sur-Saône

== Savoie (73) ==
- Aiguebelette-le-Lac
- Aiguebelle
- Aime-La Plagne
- Aix-les-Bains-Le Revard
- Albens
- Albertville
- Bourg-Saint-Maurice
- Chambéry-Challes-les-Eaux
- Chamousset
- Chindrieux
- Épierre-Saint-Léger
- Frontenex
- Grésy-sur-Aix
- Grésy-sur-Isère
- Landry
- Lépin-le-Lac-La Bauche
- Modane
- Montmélian
- Moûtiers-Salins-Brides-les-Bains
- Notre-Dame-de-Briançon
- Saint-Avre-la-Chambre
- Saint-Béron-la-Bridoire
- Saint-Jean-de-Maurienne
- Saint-Michel-Valloire
- Saint-Pierre-d'Albigny
- Vions–Chanaz
- Viviers-du-Lac

== Haute-Savoie (74) ==
- Annecy
- Annemasse
- Argentière
- Bonneville
- Bons-en-Chablais
- Les Bossons
- Le Buet
- Chamonix-Aiguille-du-Midi
- Chamonix-Mont-Blanc
- Chedde
- Cluses
- Évian-les-Bains
- Groisy-Thorens-la-Caille
- Les Houches
- La Joux
- Machilly
- Magland
- Marignier
- Montroc-le-Planet
- Les Moussoux
- Les Pélerins
- Les Praz-de-Chamonix
- Perrignier
- Pringy
- Reignier
- La Roche-sur-Foron
- Rumilly
- Saint-Gervais-les-Bains-Le Fayet
- Saint-Julien-en-Genevois
- Saint-Martin-Bellevue
- Saint-Pierre-en-Faucigny
- Sallanches-Combloux-Megève
- Servoz
- Taconnaz
- Thonon-les-Bains
- Les Tines
- Valleiry
- Vallorcine
- Vaudagne
- Viaduc-Sainte-Marie

== See also ==
- SNCF
- List of SNCF stations for SNCF stations in other regions
- TER Auvergne-Rhône-Alpes
