= Albens station =

Railway station in Albens, France

Albens
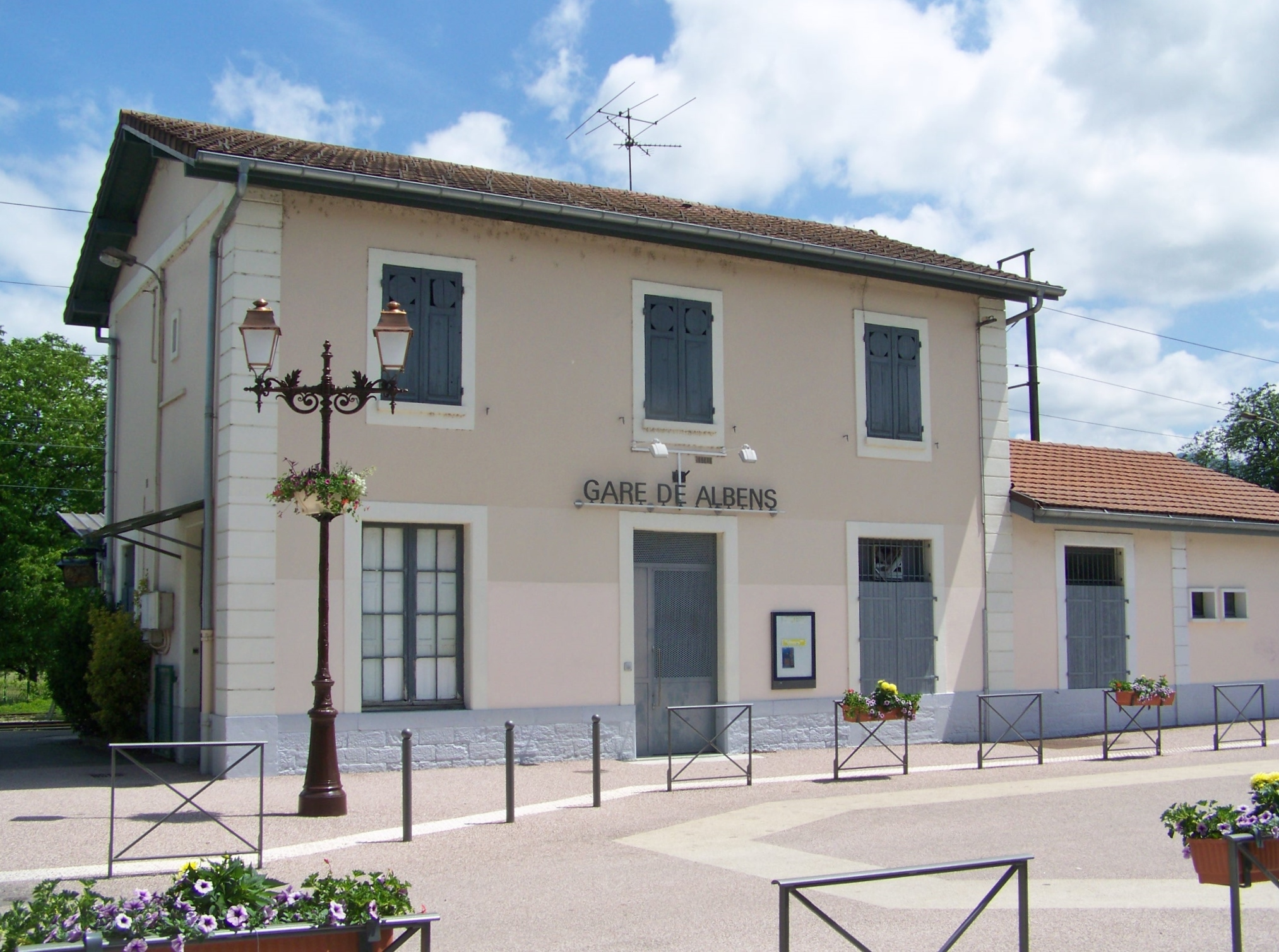
- Albens railway station

General information
- Location: Albens, Savoie, Auvergne-Rhône-Alpes, France
- Coordinates: 45°47′09″N 5°56′55″E
- Line: Aix-les-Bains–Annemasse railway
- Platforms: 2

Other information
- Station code: 87746115

History
- Opened: 1866

Passengers
- 138,278 (2023)
Services
| Preceding station | TER Auvergne-Rhône-Alpes | Following station |
|---|---|---|
| Grésy-sur-Aix towards Valence | 2 | Rumilly towards Annecy or Geneva |
| Aix-les-Bains-Le Revard towards Lyon-Part-Dieu | 4 | Rumilly towards Annecy |
Location

Albens station (French: Gare d'Albens) is a railway station located in Albens, Savoie, south-eastern France. The station was opened in 1866 and is located on the Aix-les-Bains–Annemasse railway. The trains serving this station are operated by SNCF.

== Train services ==
As of 2024, trains on the following routes call at Albens:

- Regional trains (TER Auvergne-Rhône-Alpes) Annecy - Aix-les-Bains - Chambéry - Grenoble (- Valence)
- Regional trains (TER Auvergne-Rhône-Alpes) Annecy - Aix-les-Bains - Ambérieu - Lyon

== See also ==
- List of SNCF stations in Auvergne-Rhône-Alpes
