= Groisy-Thorens-la-Caille station =

Railway station in Groisy, Haute-Savoie, France

Groisy-Thorens-la-Caille
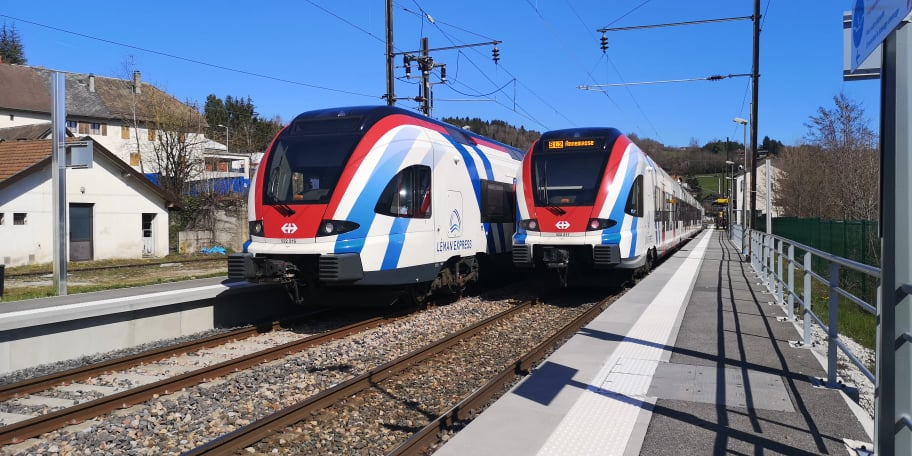
- Pringy railway station

General information
- Location: Groisy, Haute-Savoie, Auvergne-Rhône-Alpes, France
- Coordinates: 46°00′40″N 6°10′32″E
- Line: Aix-les-Bains–Annemasse railway
- Platforms: 2

Other information
- Station code: 87746248

History
- Opened: 1883

Passengers
- 118,940 (2023)
Services
Preceding station	TER Auvergne-Rhône-Alpes	Following station
La Roche-sur-Foron towards Saint-Gervais-les-Bains–Le Fayet	43	Pringy towards Annecy
Preceding station	Léman Express	Following station
La Roche-sur-Foron towards Coppet	L2	Pringy towards Annecy
Location

Groisy-Thorens-la-Caille station (French: Gare de Groisy-Thorens-la-Caille) is a railway station located in Groisy, Haute-Savoie, south-eastern France. The station was opened in 1883 and is located on the Aix-les-Bains–Annemasse railway. The trains serving this station are operated by SNCF.

== Train services ==
As of 2026, trains on the following routes call at Pringy:

- Léman Express L2 : hourly service between Annecy and Coppet.
- TER Auvergne-Rhône-Alpes: rush-hour service between Annecy and Saint-Gervais-les-Bains-Le Fayet.

== See also ==
- List of SNCF stations in Auvergne-Rhône-Alpes
