= Pringy station =

Railway station in Pringy, Haute-Savoie, France

Pringy
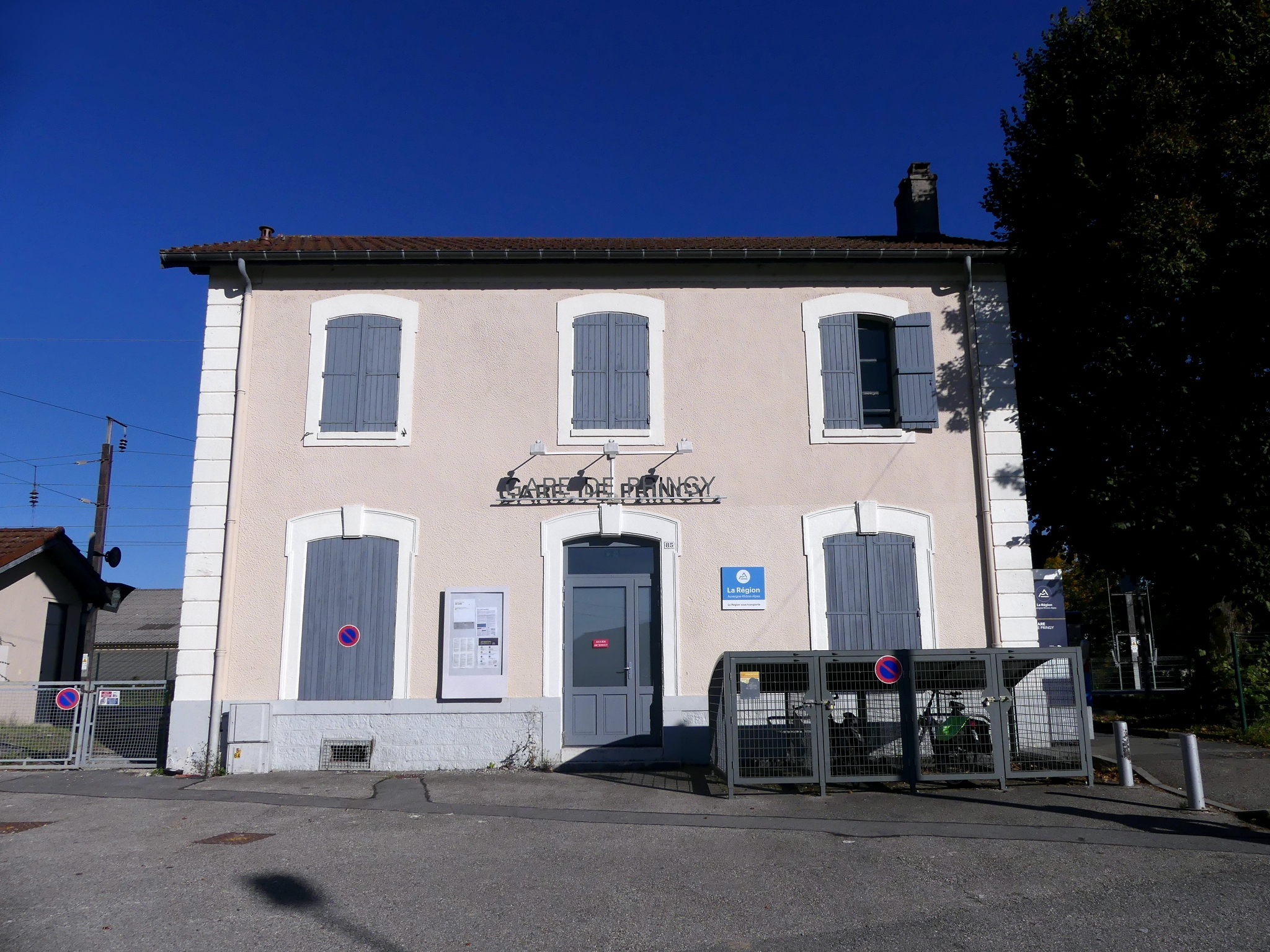
- Pringy railway station

General information
- Location: Rumilly (Annecy), Haute-Savoie, Auvergne-Rhône-Alpes, France
- Coordinates: 45°56′22″N 6°07′24″E
- Line: Aix-les-Bains–Annemasse railway
- Platforms: 2

Other information
- Station code: 87746206

History
- Opened: 1884

Passengers
- 52,748 (2023)
Services
Preceding station	TER Auvergne-Rhône-Alpes	Following station
Groisy - Thorens - la-Caille towards Saint-Gervais-les-Bains–Le Fayet	43	Annecy Terminus
Preceding station	Léman Express	Following station
Groisy - Thorens - la-Caille towards Coppet	L2	Annecy Terminus
Location

Pringy station (French: Gare de Pringy) is a railway station located in Pringy, Haute-Savoie, south-eastern France. The station was opened in 1884 and is located on the Aix-les-Bains–Annemasse railway. The trains serving this station are operated by SNCF.

== Train services ==
As of 2024, trains on the following routes call at Pringy:

- Léman Express L2 : hourly service between Annecy and Coppet.
- TER Auvergne-Rhône-Alpes: rush-hour service between Annecy and Saint-Gervais-les-Bains-Le Fayet.

== See also ==
- List of SNCF stations in Auvergne-Rhône-Alpes
