= Reignier station =

Railway station in Reignier-Esery, France

Reignier
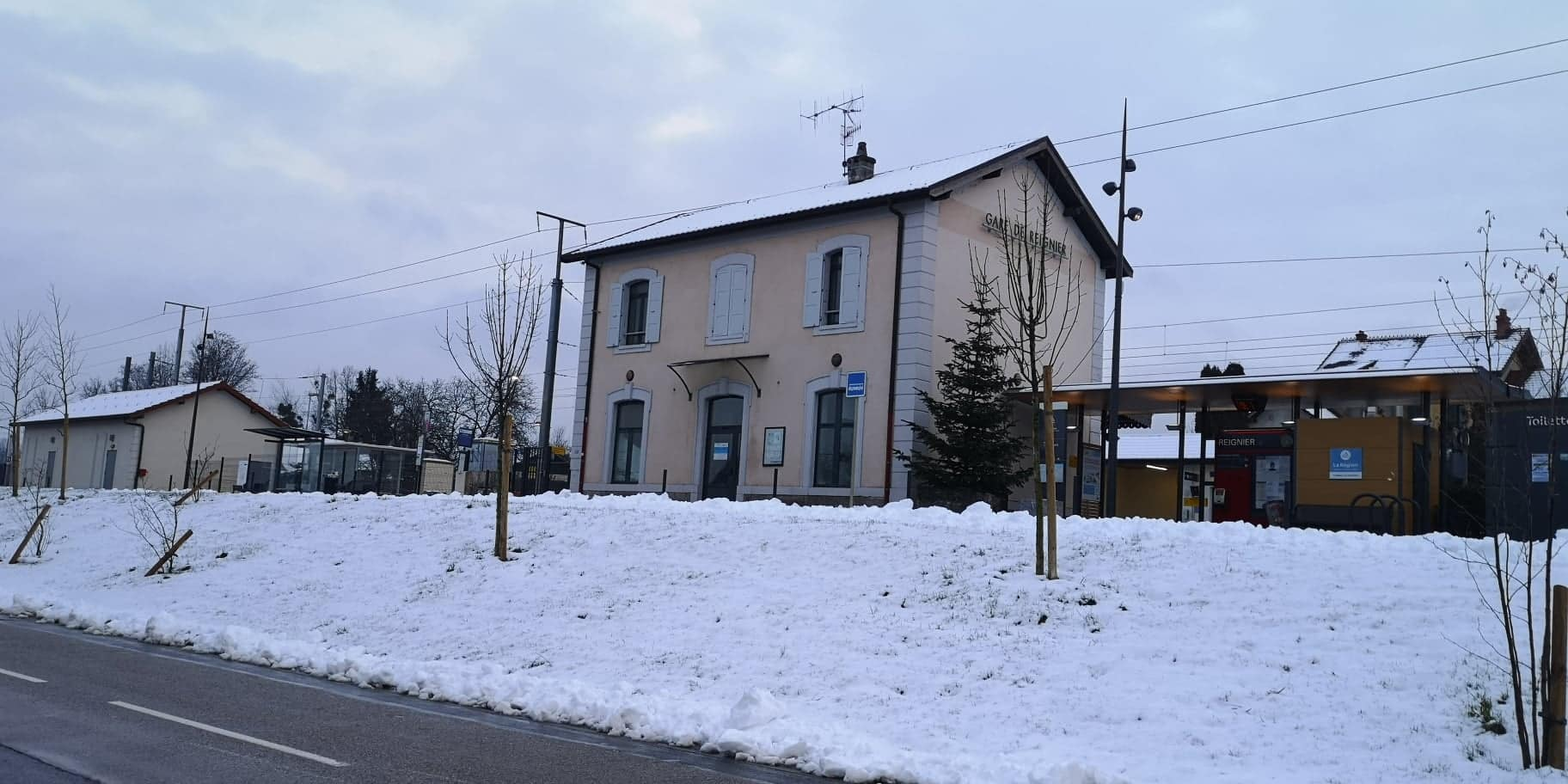
- The station building in 2021

General information
- Location: Reignier-Esery; France
- Coordinates: 46°07′32″N 6°16′03″E
- Elevation: 509 m (1,670 ft)
- Owner: SNCF
- Line: Aix-les-Bains–Annemasse line
- Distance: 84.9 km (52.8 mi) from Aix-les-Bains-Le Revard
- Train operators: SNCF
- Connections: Proxim'iTi bus lines

Passengers
- 2019: 42,475 (SNCF)

Services
Preceding station	TER Auvergne-Rhône-Alpes	Following station
Annemasse towards Lyon-Part-Dieu	3	La Roche-sur-Foron towards Saint-Gervais
Preceding station	Léman Express	Following station
Annemasse towards Coppet	L2	La Roche-sur-Foron towards Annecy
Annemasse towards Coppet	L3	La Roche-sur-Foron towards Saint-Gervais
Location
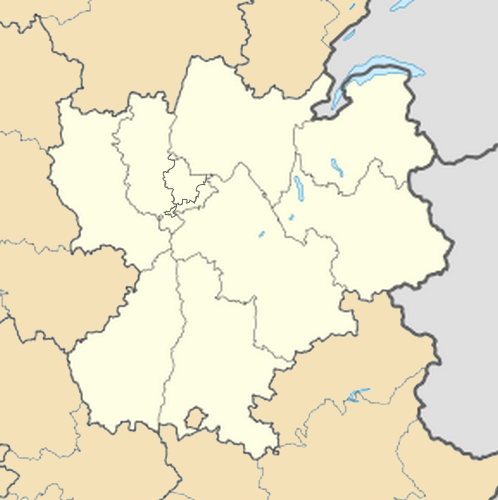
- Location within Auvergne-Rhône-Alpes Location within Rhône-Alpes Location within France

Reignier station (French: Gare de Reignier) is a railway station in the commune of Reignier-Esery, in the French department of Haute-Savoie. It is located on standard gauge Aix-les-Bains–Annemasse line of SNCF.

== Services ==
As of May 2022, the following services stop at Reignier:

- TER Auvergne-Rhône-Alpes: service between Lyon-Part-Dieu and Saint-Gervais-les-Bains-Le Fayet
- Léman Express L2 / TER Auvergne-Rhône-Alpes: hourly service between Annecy and Coppet.
- Léman Express L3 / TER Auvergne-Rhône-Alpes: hourly service between Saint-Gervais-les-Bains-Le Fayet and Annemasse; every other train continues from Annemasse to Coppet.
