= Grésy-sur-Aix station =

Railway station in Grésy-sur-Aix, France

Grésy-sur-Aix
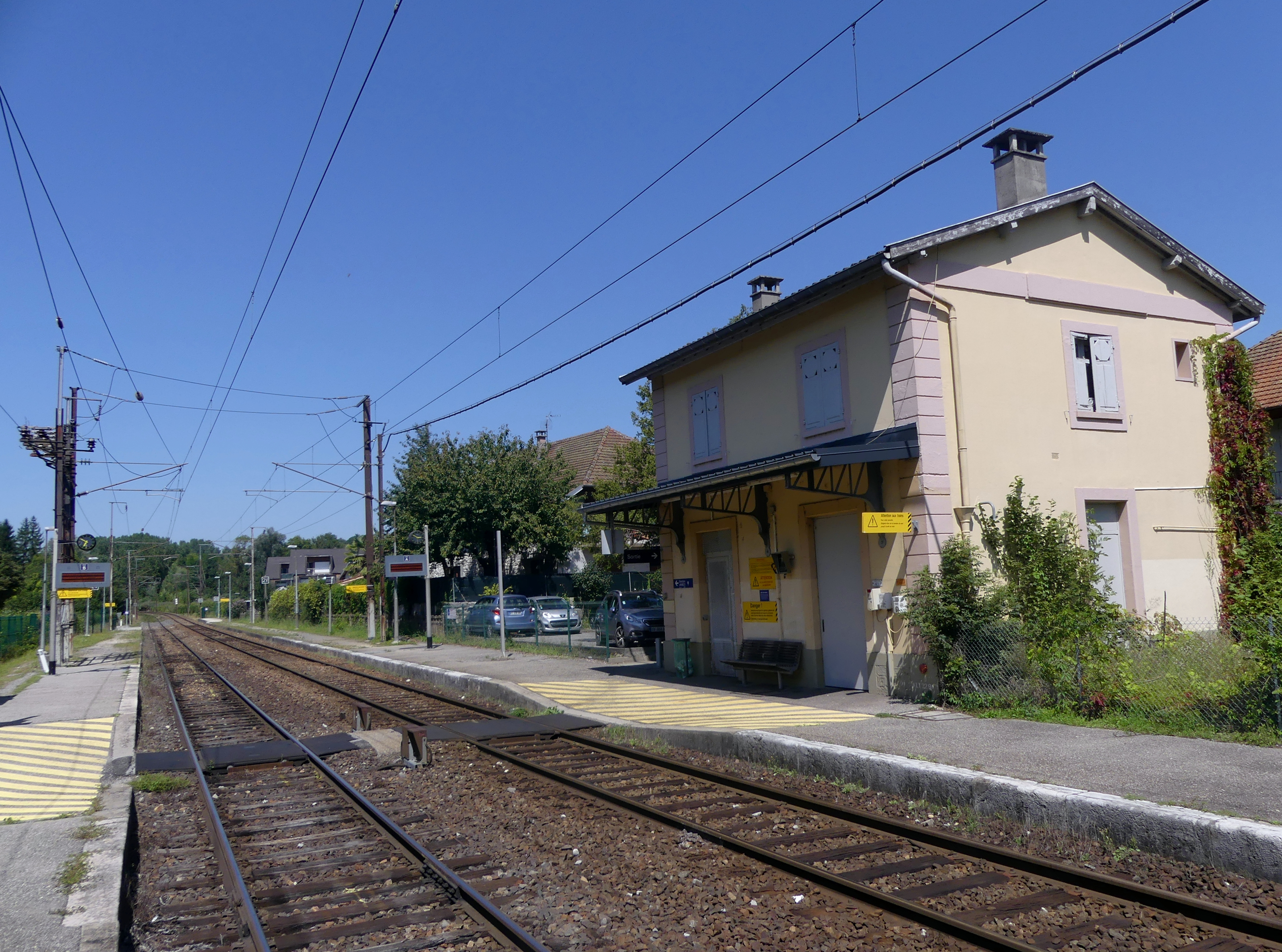
- Grésy-sur-Aix railway station

General information
- Location: Grésy-sur-Aix, Savoie, Auvergne-Rhône-Alpes; France
- Coordinates: 45°43′29″N 5°55′19″E
- Line: Aix-les-Bains–Annemasse railway
- Platforms: 2

Other information
- Station code: 87746107

History
- Opened: 1866

Passengers
- 107,274 (2023)
Services
Preceding station	TER Auvergne-Rhône-Alpes	Following station
Aix-les-Bains-Le Revard towards Valence	2	Albens towards Annecy or Geneva
Location

Grésy-sur-Aix station (French: Gare de Grésy-sur-Aix) is a railway station located in Grésy-sur-Aix, Savoie, south-eastern France. The station was opened in 1866 and is located on the Aix-les-Bains–Annemasse railway. The trains serving this station are operated by SNCF.

== Train services ==
As of 2024, trains on the following routes call at Grésy-sur-Aix:

- Regional trains (TER Auvergne-Rhône-Alpes) Annecy - Aix-les-Bains - Chambéry - Grenoble (- Valence)

== See also ==
- List of SNCF stations in Auvergne-Rhône-Alpes
