= La Roche-sur-Foron station =

Railway station in La Roche-sur-Foron, France

La Roche-sur-Foron
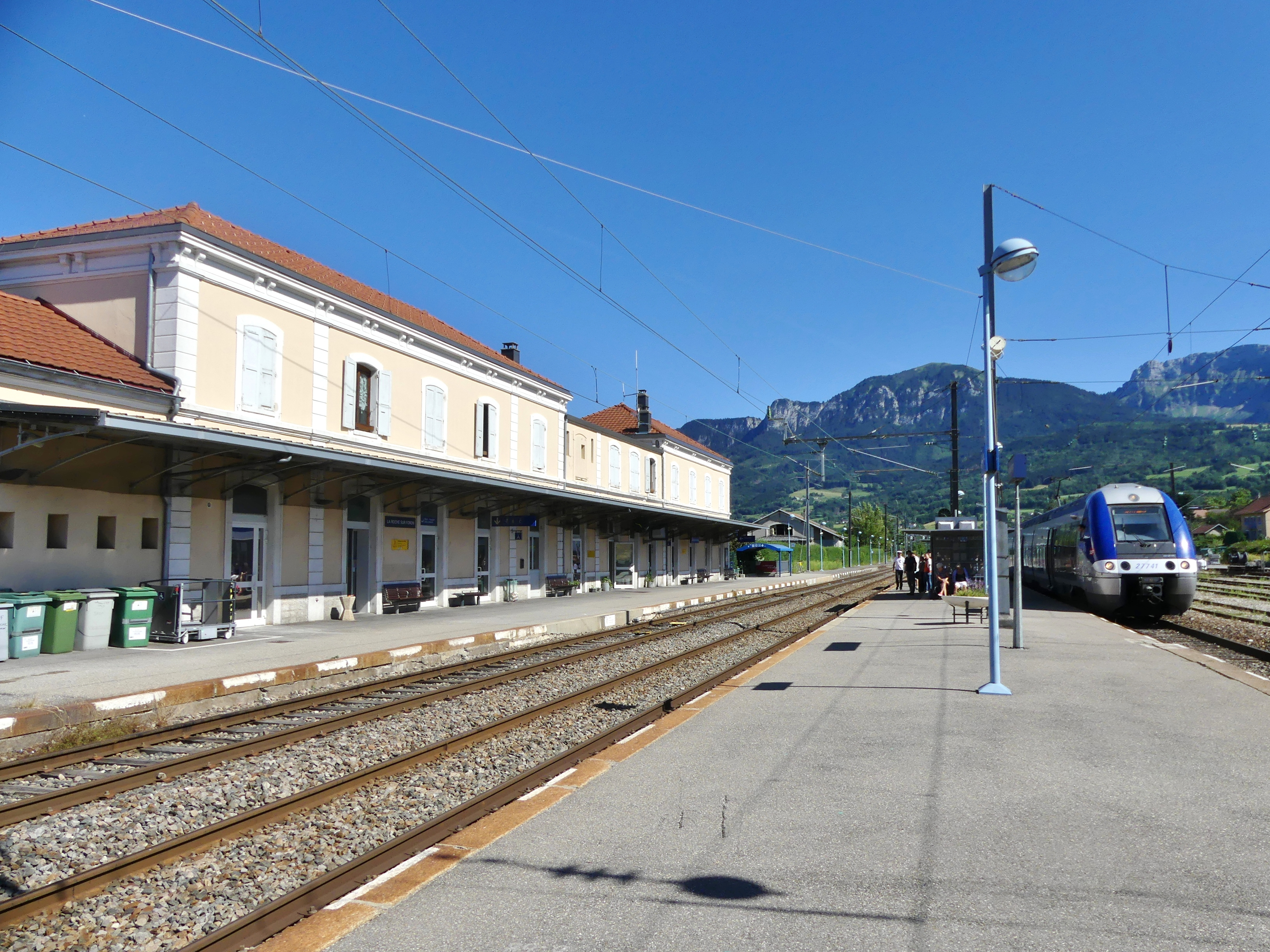
- The station in 2017

General information
- Location: La Roche-sur-Foron; France
- Coordinates: 46°04′03″N 6°18′14″E
- Elevation: 580 m (1,900 ft)
- Owner: SNCF
- Lines: Aix-les-Bains–Annemasse line; La Roche-sur-Foron–Saint-Gervais-les-Bains-Le Fayet line
- Distance: 77.7 km (48.3 mi) from Aix-les-Bains-Le Revard
- Train operators: SNCF
- Connections: Proxim'iTi bus lines

Passengers
- 2019: 371,253 (SNCF)

Services
Preceding station	TER Auvergne-Rhône-Alpes	Following station
Reignier towards Lyon-Part-Dieu	3	Saint-Pierre-en-Faucigny towards Saint-Gervais
Groisy-Thorens-la-Caille towards Annecy	43	Saint-Pierre-en-Faucigny towards Saint-Gervais
Preceding station	Léman Express	Following station
Reignier towards Coppet	L2	Groisy-Thorens-la-Caille towards Annecy
Reignier towards Coppet	L3	Saint-Pierre-en-Faucigny towards Saint-Gervais
Location
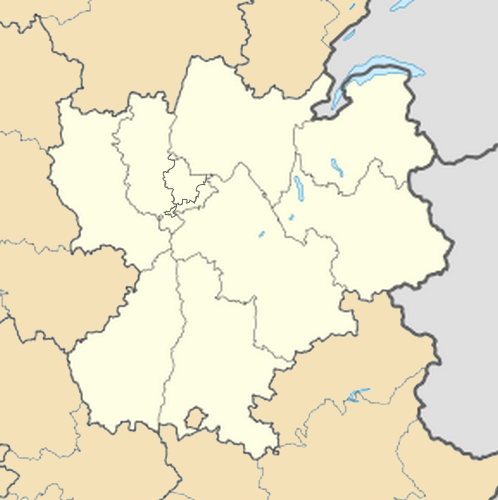
- Location within Auvergne-Rhône-Alpes Location within Rhône-Alpes Location within France

La Roche-sur-Foron station (French: Gare de La Roche-sur-Foron) is a railway station in the commune of La Roche-sur-Foron, in the French department of Haute-Savoie. It is located at the junction of the standard gauge Aix-les-Bains–Annemasse and La Roche-sur-Foron–Saint-Gervais-les-Bains-Le Fayet lines of SNCF.

== Services ==
As of the December 2020 timetable change, the following services stop at La Roche-sur-Foron:

- Léman Express L2 / TER Auvergne-Rhône-Alpes: hourly service between Annecy and Coppet.
- Léman Express L3 / TER Auvergne-Rhône-Alpes: hourly service between Saint-Gervais-les-Bains-Le Fayet and Annemasse; every other train continues from Annemasse to Coppet.
- TER Auvergne-Rhône-Alpes: rush-hour service between Annecy and Saint-Gervais-les-Bains-Le Fayet.
