= SNCF Class BB 8700 =

Class BB 8700
Type and origin
- Power type: Electric
- Builder: Alsthom
- Model: BB 8500/BB 88500
- Build date: 1964–1972
- Rebuild date: 2001
- Number rebuilt: 20
Specifications
- Configuration
  - UIC: B'B'+B'B'
- Gauge: 1,435 mm (4 ft 8 1/2 in) standard gauge
- Wheel diameter: 1,100 mm (3 ft 7.31 in)
- Length: 14.700 m (48 ft 2 3/4 in) (8710-36); 14.940 m (49 ft 1/4 in) (8737-86)
- Width: 3.038 m (9 ft 11.6 in)
- Height: 4.148 m (13 ft 7.3 in)
- Loco weight: 78.3 t (77.1 long tons; 86.3 short tons) (8710-36); 79.5 t (78.2 long tons; 87.6 short tons) (8737-86)
- Electric system/s: 1.5 kV DC Catenary
- Current pickup(s): Pantograph
- Traction motors: 2 × TAB 660 B1
Performance figures
- Maximum speed: 100 km/h (62 mph)
- Power output: 2,610 kW (3,550 CV; 3,500 hp) (8710-36); 2,940 kW (4,000 CV; 3,940 hp) (8737-86)
- Tractive effort: 646 kN (145,000 lb_{f})
Career
- Operators: SNCF/Fret
- Class: BB 8700
- Number in class: 20
- Numbers: 8710–8786
- Locale: Culoz–Modane railway
- Withdrawn: 2004–2005
- Disposition: Bank engine

The Class BB 8700 electric locomotives were rebuilt from the BB 8500 (or BB 88500) as the first subseries for the growth in Maurienne.

Indeed, while the CC 6500 participated in this task, the reorganization of traction in Maurienne had led them to other services. Since the BB 8500 had been restricted for some years to 150 km/h (93 mph), as a result of their poor suspension and for the comfort of the drivers, it was decided to re-use twenty for Maurienne. These were renumbered as Class BB 8700.

== Conversion ==
The conversion consisted particularly in the modification and expansion of the driving cabs at one end, by removing an air compressor. The BB 8700 were permanently coupled to run in pairs, with the unmodified cabs remaining in the middle, at the permanent coupling. Limited to 80 km/h (50 mph) and on a limited route, their discomfort was more bearable for the driving personnel.

== Service ==
These locomotives, assigned to freight activity and attached to the Chambéry depot, were used exclusively on the Maurienne line for banking freight trains. They ran exclusively as paired units.

By 2005, the end of their career related to the reorganization of Fret SNCF and pushed them quickly towards withdrawal. Banking locomotives became less necessary with the introduction of the more powerful Class BB 36000. If the occasion arose, a Class BB 7200 was used.

== See also ==
- List of SNCF classes
