= Reignier-Esery =

Reignier-Ésery
- Commune
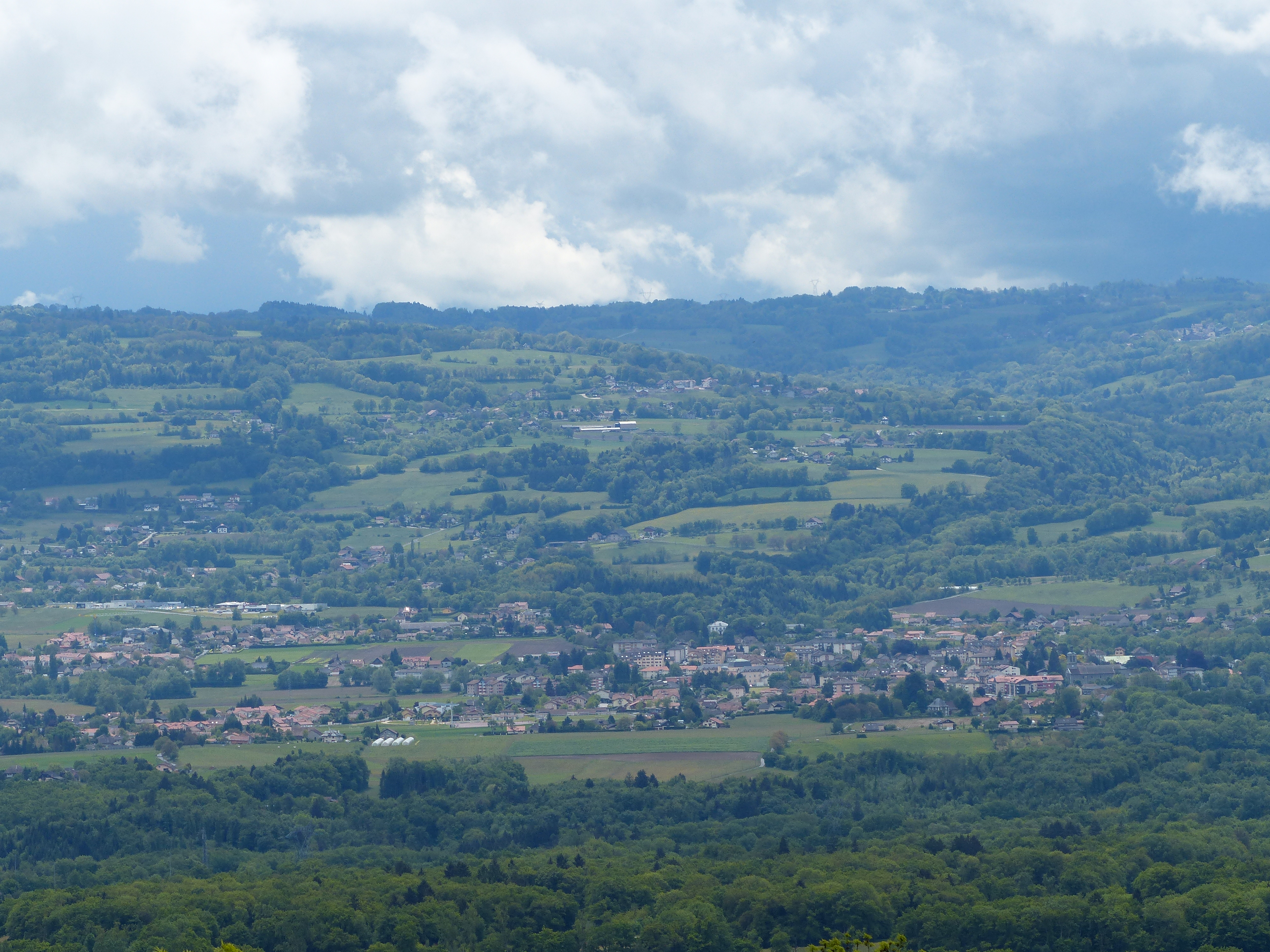
- A general view of Reignier-Esery

- Coat of arms
- Location of Reignier-Ésery
- Location within France Location within Auvergne-Rhône-Alpes
- Coordinates: 46°08′07″N 6°16′09″E
- Country: France
- Region: Auvergne-Rhône-Alpes
- Department: Haute-Savoie
- Arrondissement: Saint-Julien-en-Genevois
- Canton: La Roche-sur-Foron
- Intercommunality: CC Arve et Salève

Government
  - Mayor (2021–2026): Lucas Pugin
- Area^{1}: 25.08 km^{2} (9.68 sq mi)
- Highest elevation: 832 m (2,730 ft)
- Lowest elevation: 410 m (1,350 ft)
- Population (2023): 8,464
  - Density: 337.5/km^{2} (874.1/sq mi)
- Demonym(s): Reignerand, Reignerande
- Time zone: UTC+01:00 (CET)
  - Summer (DST): UTC+02:00 (CEST)
- INSEE/Postal code: 74220 /74930
- ^{1} French Land Register data, which excludes lakes, ponds, glaciers > 1 km^{2} (0.386 sq mi or 247 acres) and river estuaries.

Reignier-Esery (French pronunciation: [ʁɛɲe ezʁi]; before 2008: Reignier) is a commune in the Haute-Savoie department in the Auvergne-Rhône-Alpes region in south-eastern France. It belongs to the cross-border agglomeration of the "Grand Genève".

== Population ==
Historical population
Year	Pop.	±% p.a.
1968	2,589	—
1975	3,152	+2.85%
1982	3,652	+2.13%
1990	4,067	+1.35%
1999	5,269	+2.92%
2007	6,141	+1.93%
2012	7,125	+3.02%
2017	7,994	+2.33%
2023	8,464	+0.96%
Source: INSEE

== Transport ==
The commune has a railway station, Reignier, on the Aix-les-Bains–Annemasse line.

== See also ==
- Communes of the Haute-Savoie department
