= Culoz station =

Railway station in Culoz, France

Coordinates: 45°50′36″N 5°46′43″E

Culoz
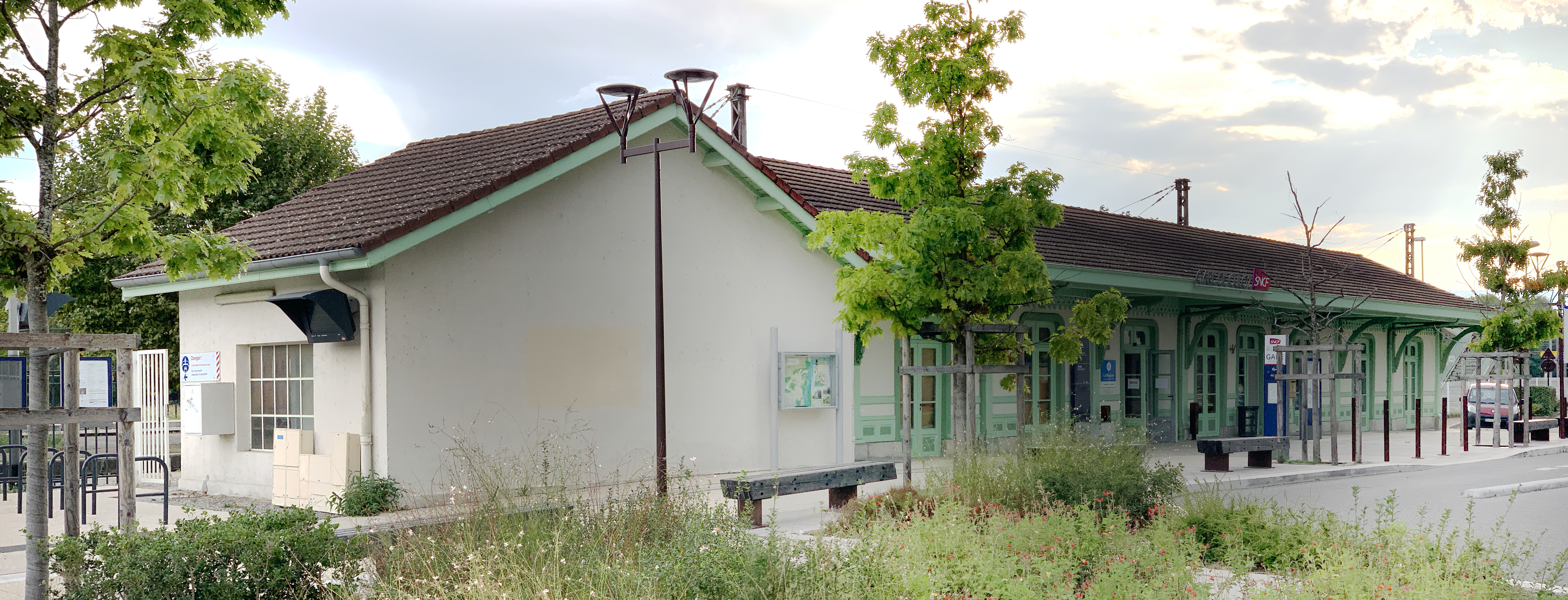

General information
- Location: Route de Béon; 01350 Culoz; Ain; France
- Elevation: 237 m (778 ft)
- Owner: SNCF
- Operator: SNCF
- Lines: Lyon–Geneva railway Culoz–Modane railway
- Distance: 101.355 km
- Platforms: 3
- Tracks: 5

History
- Opened: 20 July 1857

Passengers
- 2019: 260,868

Services
| Preceding station | TER Auvergne-Rhône-Alpes | Following station |
|---|---|---|
| Aix-les-Bains-Le Revard towards Valence | 2 | Bellegarde towards Geneva |
| Virieu-le-Grand-Belley towards Lyon-Part-Dieu | 3 | Seyssel-Corbonod towards Saint-Gervais, Geneva or Évian-les-Bains |
| Virieu-le-Grand-Belley towards Lyon-Part-Dieu | 35 | Aix-les-Bains-Le Revard towards Chambéry |
| Vions–Chanaz towards Chambéry | 51 | Seyssel-Corbonod towards Geneva |
Location

Culoz station (French: Gare de Culoz) is a French railway station located in commune of Culoz, Ain department in the Auvergne-Rhône-Alpes region. It is located at kilometric point (KP) 101.355 on the Lyon–Geneva railway. The station is equally the origin of Culoz–Modane railway.

The station was put into service in 1857 by the Compagnie du chemin de fer de Lyon à Genève.

As of 2020, the station is owned and operated by the SNCF and served by TER Auvergne-Rhône-Alpes trains.

== History ==
Culoz station was put into service on 20 July 1857 by the Compagnie du chemin de fer de Lyon à Genève, along with a section of railway between Ambérieu and Seyssel.

The railway line was re-bought by the Compagnie des chemins de fer de Paris à Lyon et à la Méditerranée (PLM) in 1858. On 2 September 1858, the Maurienne railway was inaugurated by the Compagnie du chemin de fer Victor-Emmanuel between a bridge crossing the Rhône and the station.

The historic station vestibule, which fronts the street, has been the subject of the title of monuments historiques since 23 January 2009. This protection didn't affect the second larger building, constructed at the same time between the platforms, which was removed in 2009.

In 2019, the SNCF estimated that 260,868 passengers traveled through the station.

== Services ==
=== Passenger services ===
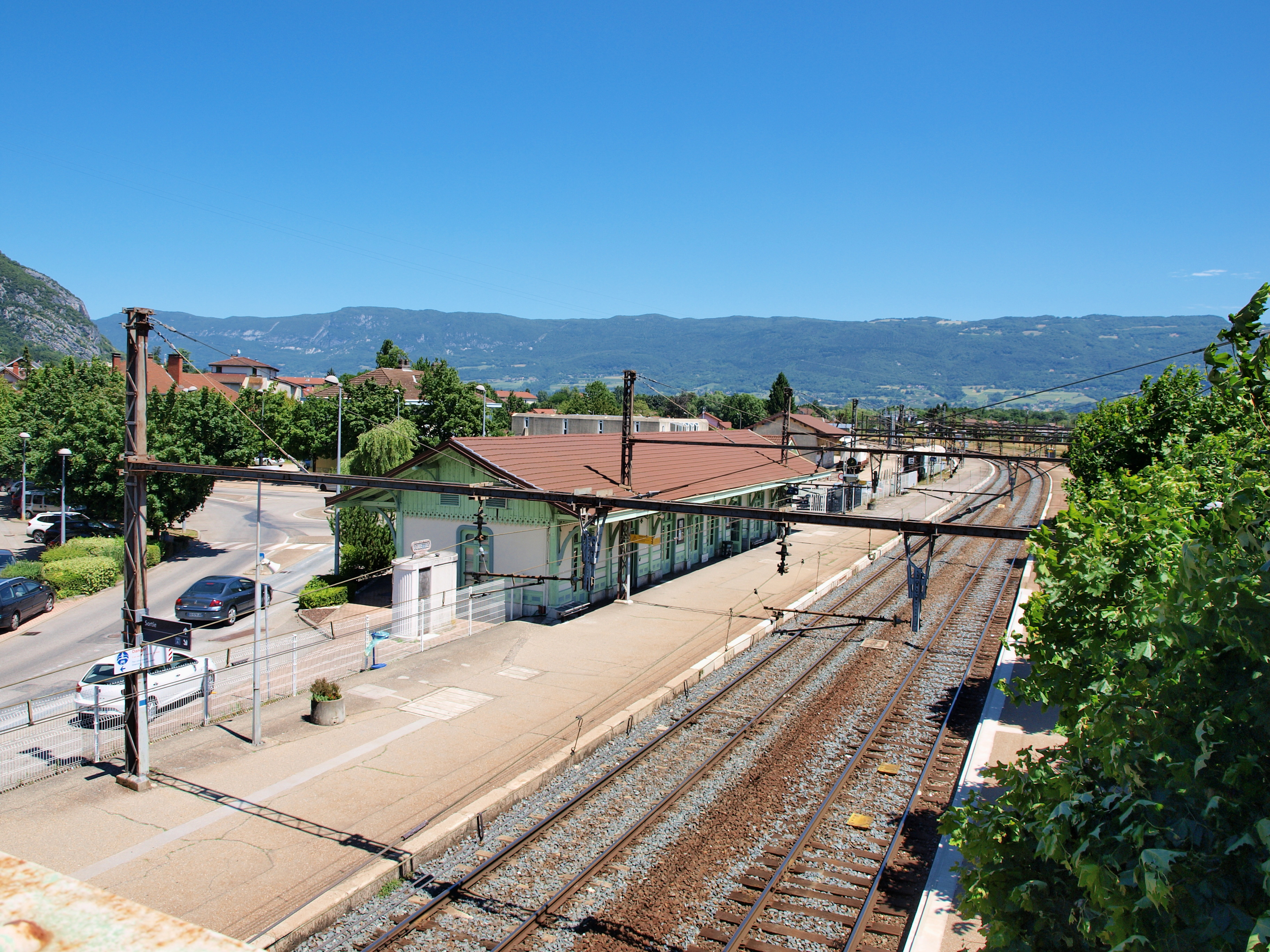
Passenger building.

Operated by the SNCF, the station is composed of passenger building with a ticket window open throughout week. The station is equally equipped with automatic ticket machines.

=== Train services ===
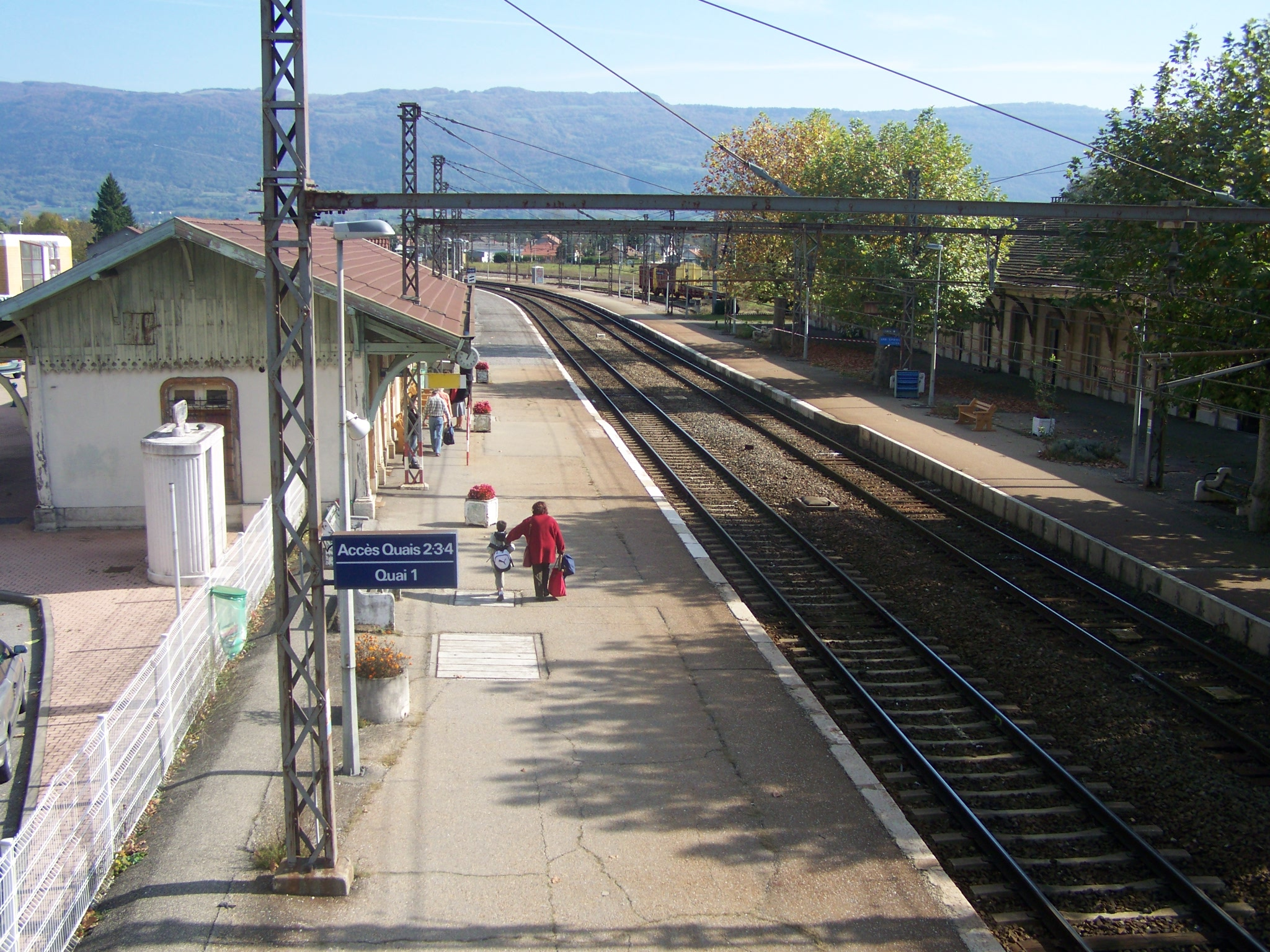
Platform 1 (direction Geneva) and platform 2 (direction Lyon) on the Lyon-Geneva railway. The now removed center building is on the right.

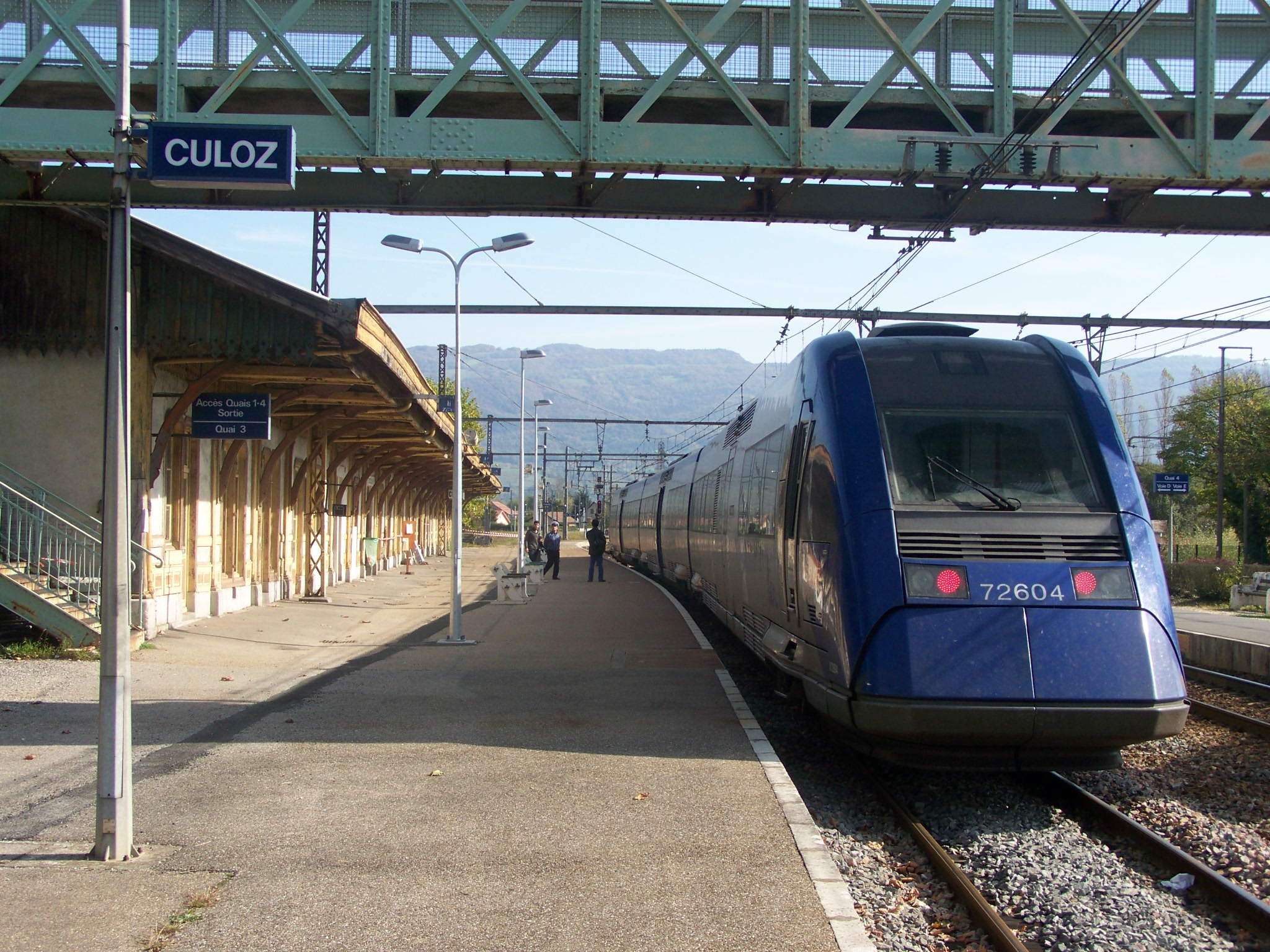
TER at Culoz station.

As of 2020, the station is served by the following services:

- Regional services (TER Auvergne-Rhône-Alpes 02) Geneva ... Grenoble ... Valence.
- Regional services (TER Auvergne-Rhône-Alpes 03) Saint-Gervais/Évian/Geneva ... Bellegarde ... Lyon.
- Regional services (TER Auvergne-Rhône-Alpes 35) Chambéry ... Culoz ... Ambérieu ... Lyon.
- Regional services (TER Auvergne-Rhône-Alpes 51) Chambéry ... Culoz ... Geneva.

=== Intermodality ===
In addition to a parking lot for passengers, the station is equipped with secure bicycle storage facilities.

== See also ==
- List of SNCF stations in Auvergne-Rhône-Alpes
