= Grésy-sur-Aix =

Grésy-sur-Aix Graizi (Savoyard)
- Commune
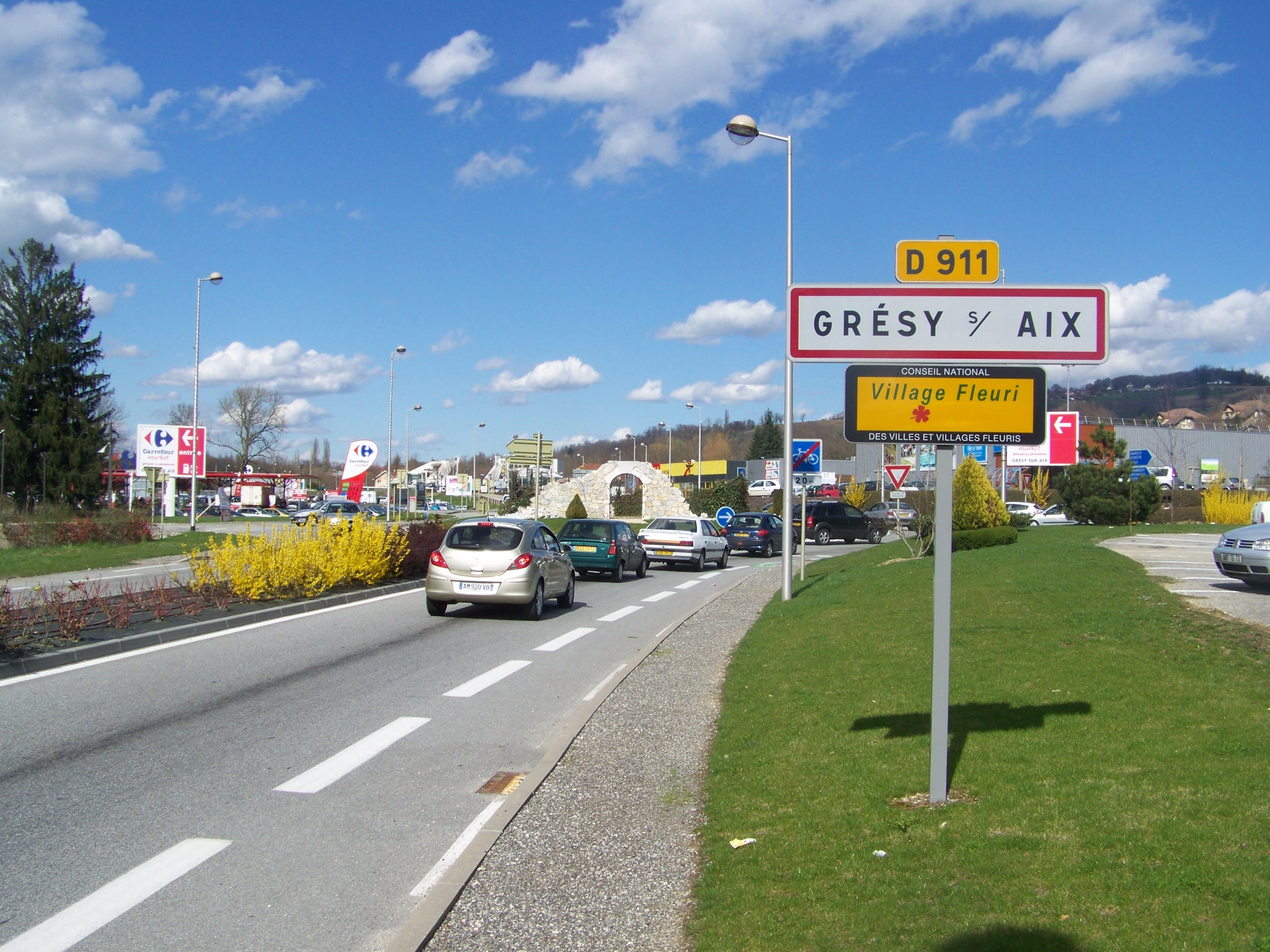
- The road into Grésy-sur-Aix
- Location of Grésy-sur-Aix
- Location within France Location within Auvergne-Rhône-Alpes
- Coordinates: 45°43′26″N 5°56′05″E
- Country: France
- Region: Auvergne-Rhône-Alpes
- Department: Savoie
- Arrondissement: Chambéry
- Canton: Aix-les-Bains-1
- Intercommunality: CA Grand Lac

Government
  - Mayor (2020–2026): Florian Maitre
- Area^{1}: 12.73 km^{2} (4.92 sq mi)
- Highest elevation: 620 m (2,030 ft)
- Lowest elevation: 253 m (830 ft)
- Population (2023): 4,740
  - Density: 372/km^{2} (964/sq mi)
- Time zone: UTC+01:00 (CET)
  - Summer (DST): UTC+02:00 (CEST)
- INSEE/Postal code: 73128 /73100
- Website: www.gresy-sur-aix.fr
- ^{1} French Land Register data, which excludes lakes, ponds, glaciers > 1 km^{2} (0.386 sq mi or 247 acres) and river estuaries.

Grésy-sur-Aix (French pronunciation: [ɡʁezi syʁ ɛks], literally Grésy on Aix; Savoyard: Graizi) is a commune in the Savoie department in the Auvergne-Rhône-Alpes region in south-eastern France. It is 4 kilometres (2.5 miles) away from Aix-les-Bains. It is part of the urban area of Chambéry.

== Population ==
Historical population
Year	Pop.	±% p.a.
1968	1,328	—
1975	1,517	+1.92%
1982	1,934	+3.53%
1990	2,374	+2.60%
1999	2,828	+1.96%
2007	3,644	+3.22%
2012	4,181	+2.79%
2017	4,545	+1.68%
2023	4,740	+0.70%
Source: INSEE

== Notable people ==
- Antoine Philibert Albert Bailly, (1605-1691), bishop of Aosta

== See also ==
- Communes of the Savoie department
- Grésy-sur-Aix station
