= Viviers-du-Lac station =

Railway station in Viviers-du-Lac, France

Viviers-du-Lac
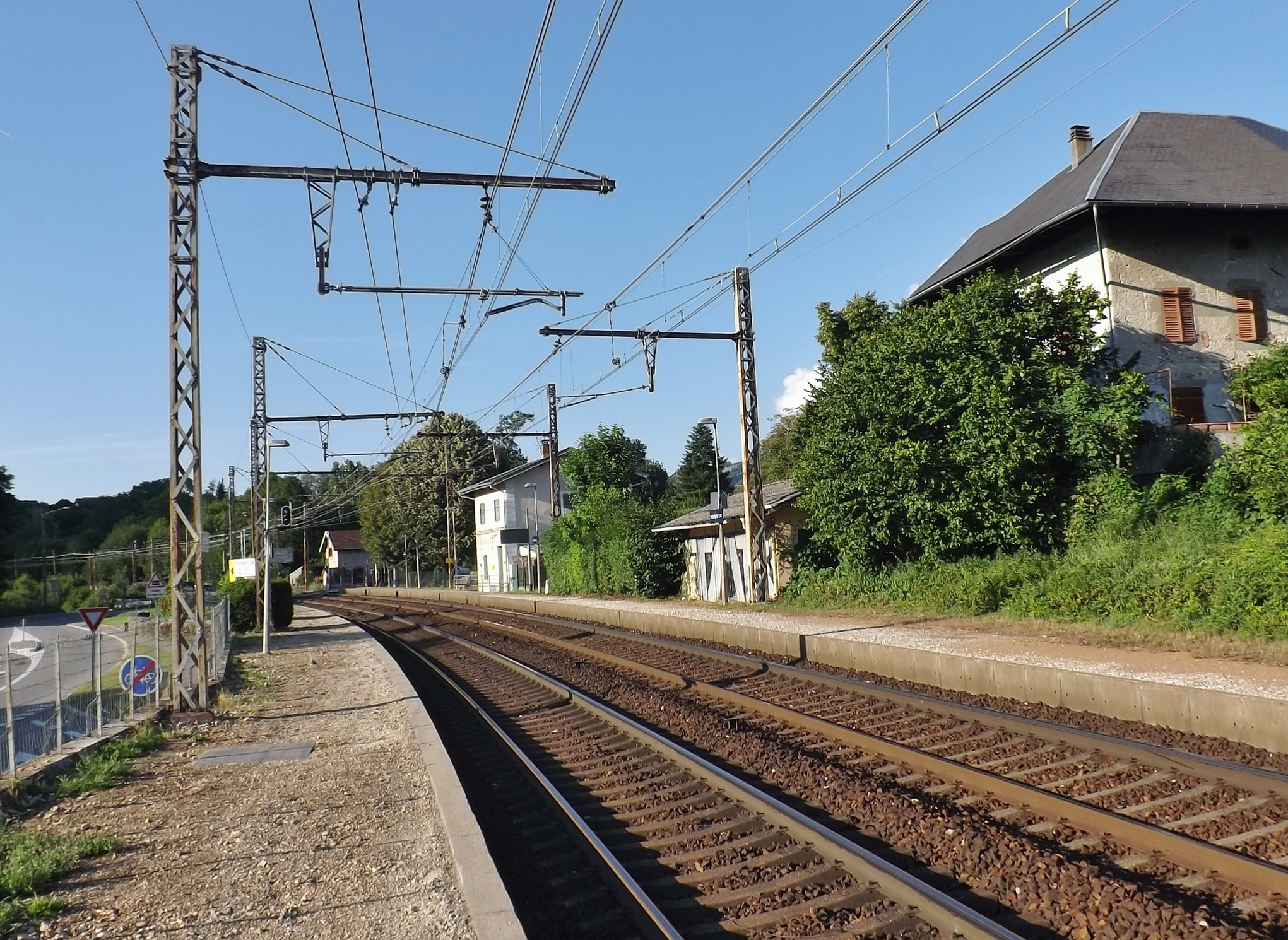
- Viviers-du-Lac railway station

General information
- Location: Viviers-du-Lac, Savoie, Auvergne-Rhône-Alpes, France
- Coordinates: 45°38′55″N 5°54′12″E
- Line: Culoz–Modane railway
- Platforms: 2

Other information
- Station code: 87741140

Passengers
- 12,869 (2023)
Services
Preceding station	TER Auvergne-Rhône-Alpes	Following station
Chambéry-Challes-les-Eaux Terminus	51	Aix-les-Bains-Le Revard towards Geneva
Location

Viviers-du-Lac station (French: Gare de Viviers-du-Lac) is a railway station located in Viviers-du-Lac, Savoie, south-eastern France. The station is located on the Culoz–Modane railway. The train services are operated by SNCF.

== Train services ==
The following services call at Viviers-du-Lac As of 2024:

- Regional services (TER Auvergne-Rhône-Alpes) Geneva - Bellegarde - Aix-les-Bains - Chambéry - Grenoble
