= La Roche-sur-Foron =

La Roche-sur-Foron La Roche (Arpitan)
- Commune
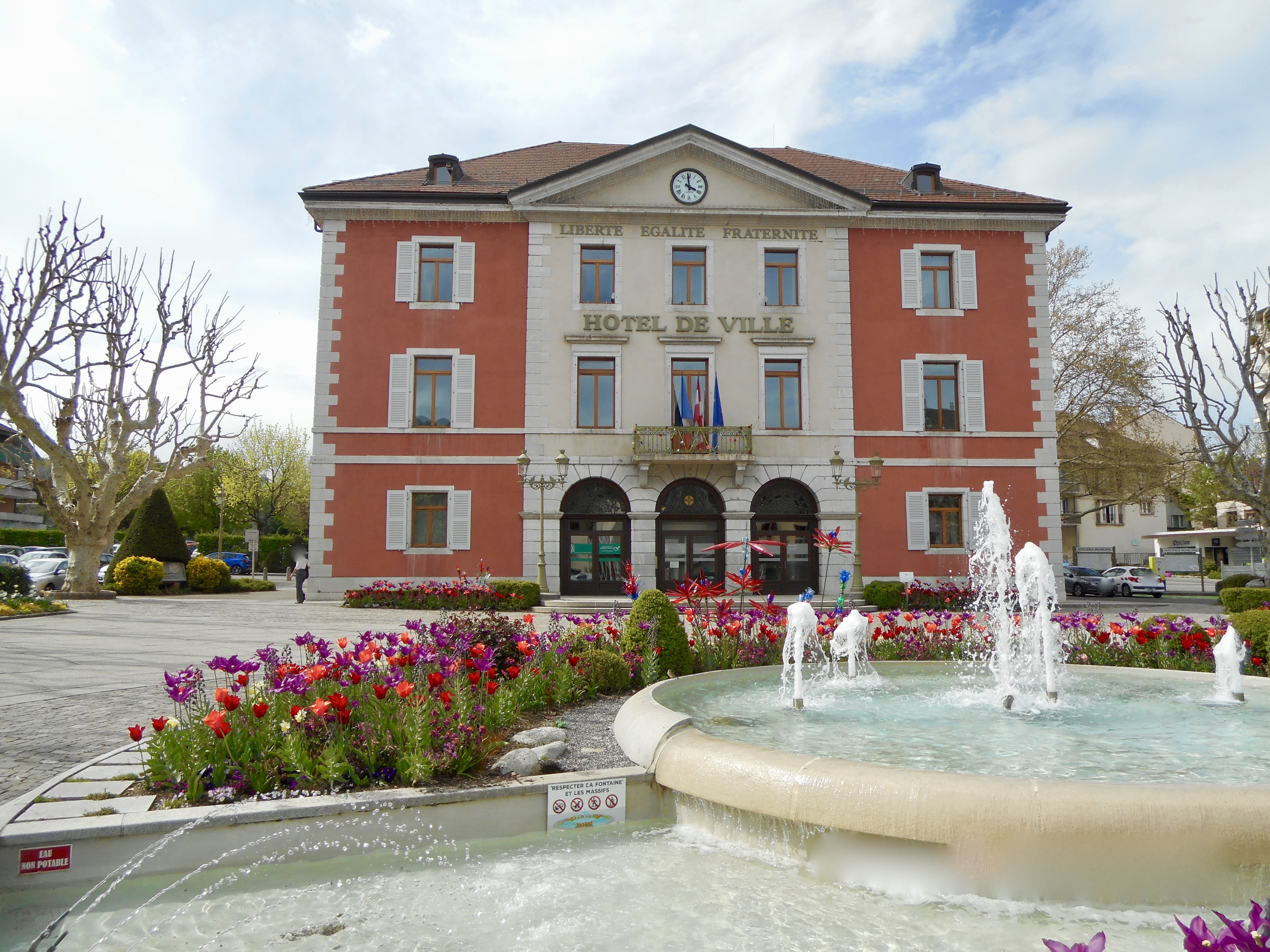
- La Roche-sur-Foron Town Hall

- Coat of arms
- Location of La Roche-sur-Foron
- Location within France Location within Auvergne-Rhône-Alpes
- Coordinates: 46°04′02″N 6°18′41″E
- Country: France
- Region: Auvergne-Rhône-Alpes
- Department: Haute-Savoie
- Arrondissement: Bonneville
- Canton: La Roche-sur-Foron
- Intercommunality: CC du Pays Rochois

Government
  - Mayor (2022–2026): Pierrick Ducimetiere
- Area^{1}: 17.94 km^{2} (6.93 sq mi)
- Highest elevation: 1,896 m (6,220 ft)
- Lowest elevation: 500 m (1,600 ft)
- Population (2023): 11,348
  - Density: 632.6/km^{2} (1,638/sq mi)
- Demonym: Rochois / Rochoises
- Time zone: UTC+01:00 (CET)
  - Summer (DST): UTC+02:00 (CEST)
- INSEE/Postal code: 74224 /74800
- Website: Larochesurforon.fr
- ^{1} French Land Register data, which excludes lakes, ponds, glaciers > 1 km^{2} (0.386 sq mi or 247 acres) and river estuaries.

La Roche-sur-Foron (French pronunciation: [la ʁɔʃ syʁ fɔʁɔ̃]; Arpitan: La Roche) is a commune in the Haute-Savoie department in the Auvergne-Rhône-Alpes region in Southeastern France.

It is located about 23 km (14.2 mi) southeast of Geneva, Switzerland. La Roche-sur-Foron station has rail connections to Lyon, Annecy, Saint-Gervais and Geneva.

== Population ==
Historical population
Year	Pop.	±% p.a.
1968	5,049	—
1975	6,008	+2.52%
1982	6,627	+1.41%
1990	7,116	+0.89%
1999	8,538	+2.04%
2007	9,912	+1.88%
2012	10,635	+1.42%
2017	11,339	+1.29%
2023	11,348	+0.01%
Source: INSEE

== Noted local personality ==
- Luigi Pelloux (1839–1924), Prime Minister of Italy

== See also ==
- Communes of the Haute-Savoie department
