= Viviers-du-Lac =

Viviers-du-Lac Le Vevyé (Savoyard)
- Commune
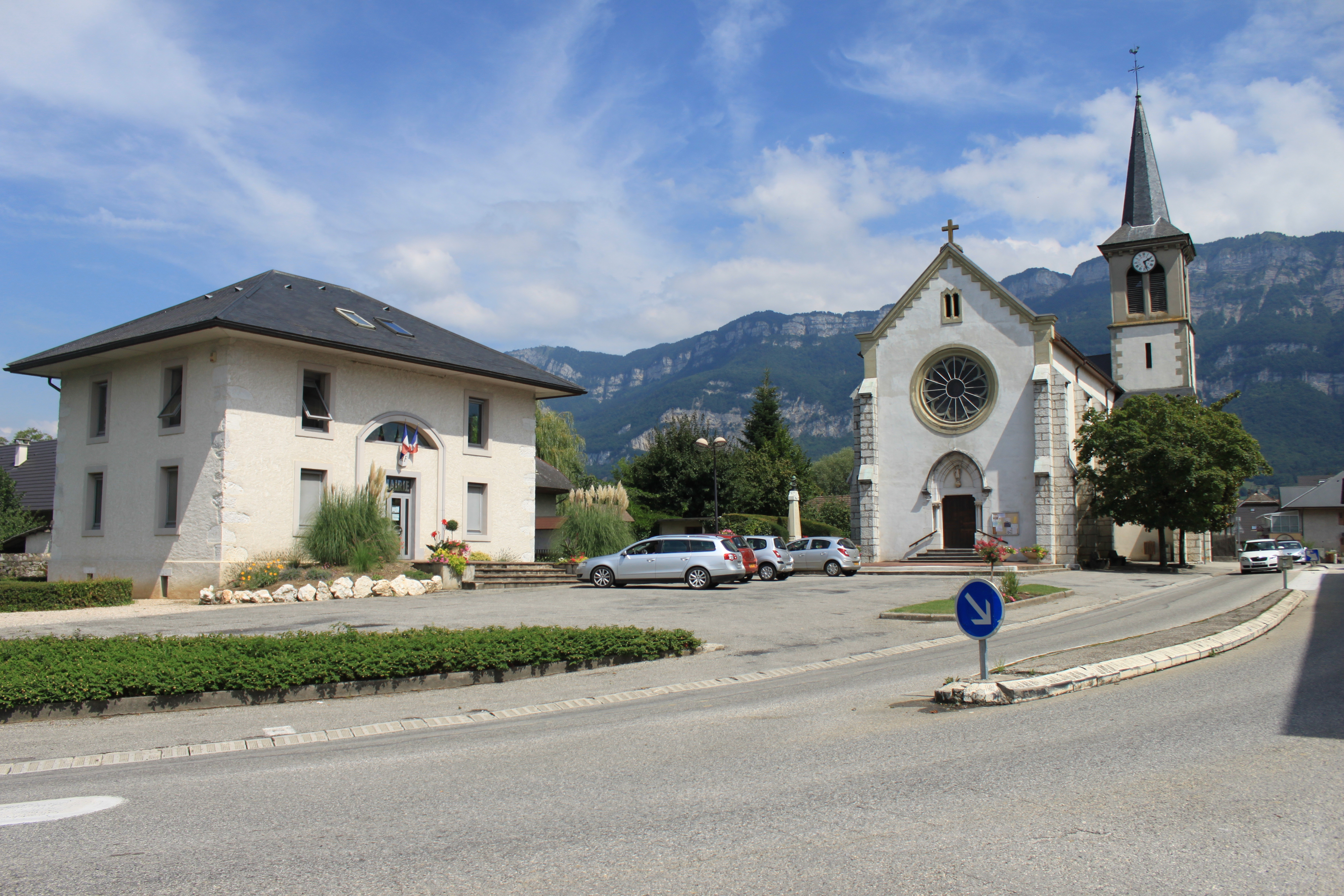
- The town hall and church in Viviers-du-Lac
- Location of Viviers-du-Lac
- Location within France Location within Auvergne-Rhône-Alpes
- Coordinates: 45°38′55″N 5°54′23″E
- Country: France
- Region: Auvergne-Rhône-Alpes
- Department: Savoie
- Arrondissement: Chambéry
- Canton: La Motte-Servolex
- Intercommunality: CA Grand Lac

Government
  - Mayor (2020–2026): Robert Aguettaz
- Area^{1}: 3.94 km^{2} (1.52 sq mi)
- Highest elevation: 389 m (1,276 ft)
- Lowest elevation: 228 m (748 ft)
- Population (2023): 2,355
  - Density: 598/km^{2} (1,550/sq mi)
- Time zone: UTC+01:00 (CET)
  - Summer (DST): UTC+02:00 (CEST)
- INSEE/Postal code: 73328 /73420
- Website: www.viviersdulac.fr
- ^{1} French Land Register data, which excludes lakes, ponds, glaciers > 1 km^{2} (0.386 sq mi or 247 acres) and river estuaries.

Viviers-du-Lac (French pronunciation: [vivje dy lak], literally Viviers of the Lake; Savoyard: Le Vevyé) is a commune in the Savoie department in the Auvergne-Rhône-Alpes region in south-eastern France. It is part of the urban area of Chambéry. When Air Alpes existed, its head office was in the Chambéry Airport in the commune.

== Population ==
Historical population
Year	Pop.	±% p.a.
1968	711	—
1975	775	+1.24%
1982	971	+3.27%
1990	1,144	+2.07%
1999	1,491	+2.99%
2007	1,909	+3.14%
2012	2,140	+2.31%
2017	2,235	+0.87%
2023	2,355	+0.88%
Source: INSEE

== See also ==
- Communes of the Savoie department
- Viviers-du-Lac station
