= Saint-Michel-de-Maurienne derailment =

1917 railway accident in France

Coordinates: 45°12′40″N 6°29′11″E

Saint-Michel-de-Maurienne train derailment
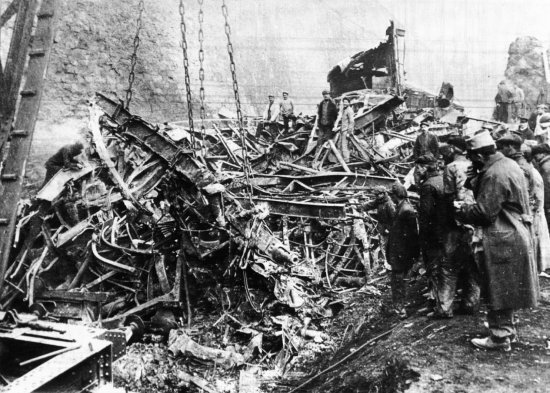
- Wreckage of the French military train, December 13, 1917

Details
- Date: December 12, 1917
- Location: Saint-Michel-de-Maurienne
- Country: France
- Line: Maurienne valley rail line, Culoz–Modane railway
- Operator: French military
- Cause: Very steep slope of the railway line, insufficient braking power, overloaded coaches.

Statistics
- Trains: 1
- Passengers: 982
- Deaths: 435
- Injured: 194
- Damage: 14 train cars destroyed

The Saint-Michel-de-Maurienne derailment of December 12, 1917, was a railway accident involving a troop train carrying at least 1,000 French soldiers on their way home for leave from the Italian front in World War I. A derailment as the train descended the Maurienne Valley on the Culoz–Modane railway caused a catastrophic crash and subsequent fire in which more than 435 died; a second record reports that 675 died. It is France's deadliest rail accident to date, and is the third largest rail disaster in world history by death toll.

== Background of the accident ==
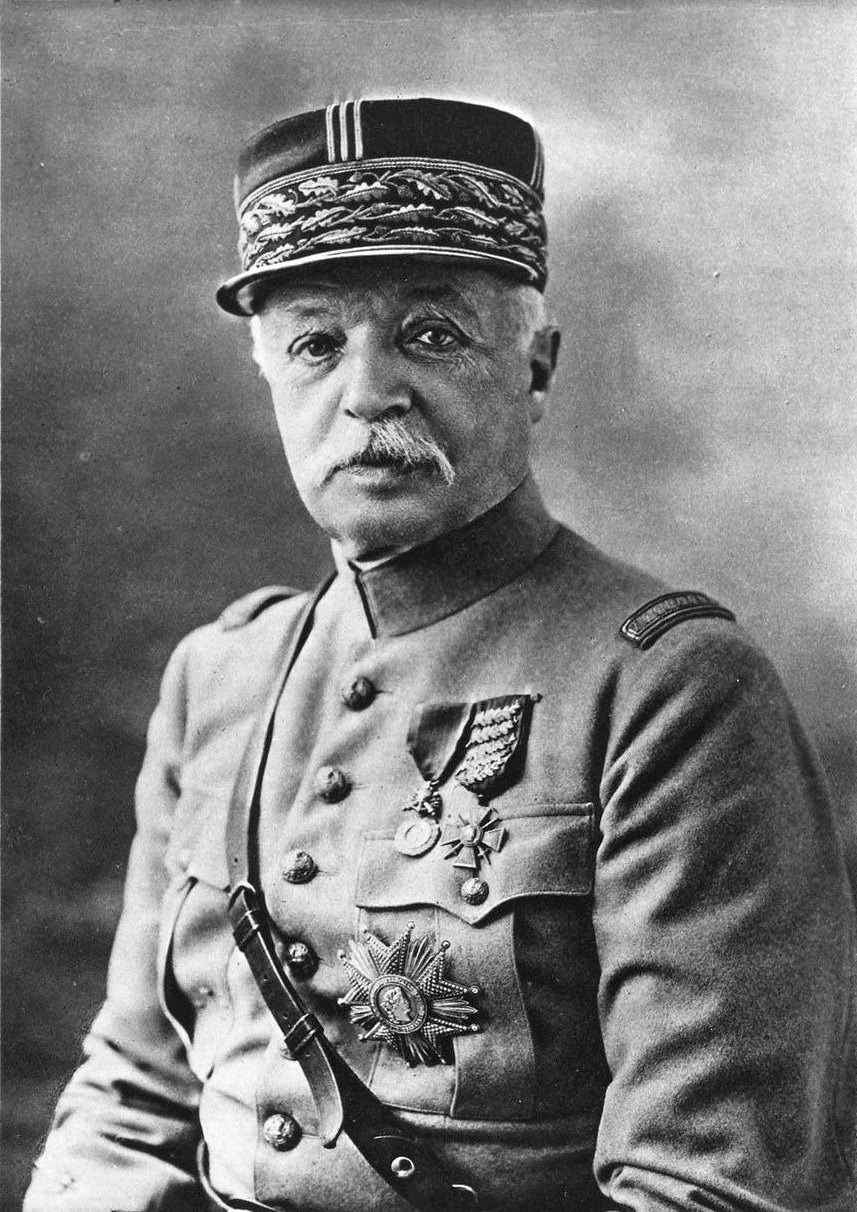
General Émile Fayolle

Following the Battle of Caporetto, which took place from October 24 to November 19 1917, a British and French Expeditionary Corps was sent to northeast Italy in order to reinforce the Italian front line. When the Italian front stabilized a month later, General Émile Fayolle, who was the new commander in chief of the French troops supporting the Italians, granted leave to soldiers who had previously fought on the Western Front so that morale would improve in the wake of the 1917 French Army mutinies. At the end of November 1917, a rail transport plan was organized to transport the French soldiers from Vicenza, an Italian city, to railway stations in France.

On the night of December 12-13 1917, military train number 612 was returning from Italy filled with French soldiers who had spent a month helping Italian troops.

After passing through the Mont Cenis Tunnel the train reached Modane station, where two additional cars were coupled to the train before the journey onward to Chambéry. From there they were to disperse to join their families throughout France for 15 days of leave covering the year-end holidays. The train stopped at Modane for 1 hour to allow other trains to pass. Most of the officers left the train during this stop, to take the Modane-Paris express.

== The train ==
The train consisted of 19 coaches of Italian construction: one baggage van at each end, 15 cars with bogies, and two fixed-axle coaches added at Modane, for a total length of 350 metres and total weight of 526 tonnes. By official count it was carrying 982 enlisted men of the 46th and 47th divisions. The cars were of wooden construction with metal chassis. Due to a shortage of locomotives in the area, the local commanding officer for rail traffic chose to couple two trains with a combined 19 coaches to a single 4-6-0 engine. Of those coaches, only the first three had air brakes, the remaining coaches had only hand brakes or no brakes at all. The compressed-air brakes worked on only the first three cars of the train, and seven brakemen (two of whom died in the derailment) had been distributed throughout the train, to set the brakes when signalled to do so by the locomotive whistle.

The train may have been carrying more than the official number of soldiers, and was overloaded for operation on the steep 3.3% grade between Modane (elevation 1040 metres) and Saint Michel de Maurienne (elevation 710 metres), with too many cars relative to the braking power of the single locomotive. Such a train normally would have had two engines. However, the second assigned locomotive had been requisitioned for a munitions train by the officer in charge of dispatching. The driver objected to taking the heavy load with a single engine, but was overruled by the transport officer.

== The accident ==
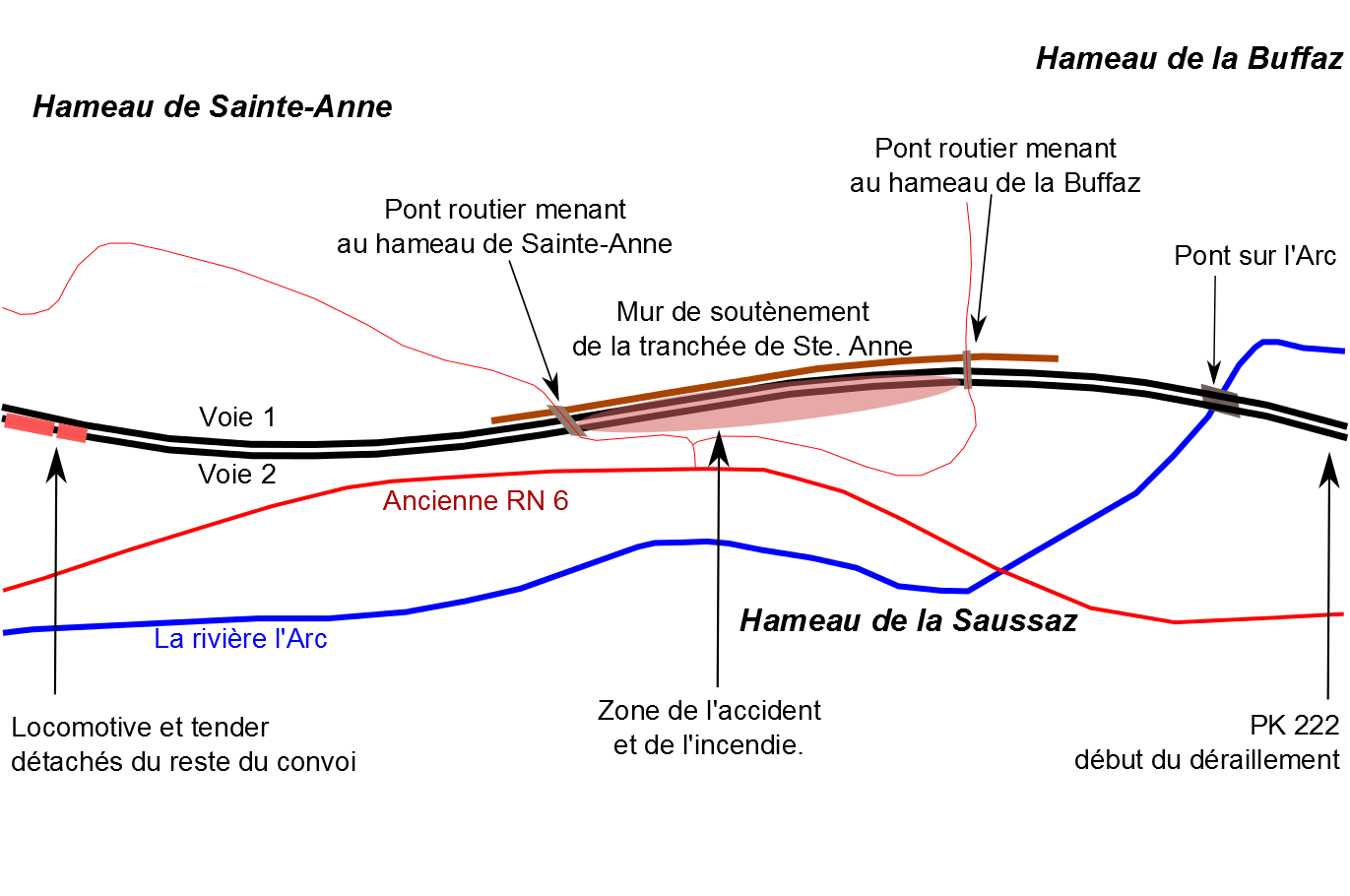
Site of the accident

The train departed from Modane station at 11:15 p.m., and descended into the valley. The driver began the downhill descent as slowly as possible, at 10 km/h (6 mph) on the first incline, but from Freney onwards, a short distance from Modane, the train began accelerating to an eventual uncontrollable speed of 135 km/h (84 mph) as measured by the locomotive's speed indicator. The driver applied the brakes to no effect, owing to the heavy load, and quickly lost control of the train. Lacking sufficient braking power for the steep downgrade of 3.3 percent, the train derailed.

The first coach derailed at 102 km/h (63 mph) where the authorized speed was 40 km/h (25 mph), and its coupler broke only 1,300 metres from Saint Michel de Maurienne station shortly after crossing the metal highway bridge at Saussaz, over the river Arc. The wooden coaches smashed into one another and promptly caught fire, caused by the overheated brakes and lit candles which had been brought aboard due to faulty electric lighting. The fire was also fed by grenades and other explosives carried without authorization by the soldiers returning home. The fire did not burn out until the evening of the following day. The derailment occurred at a point where the railway line passed through a narrow gap in the mountain terrain, leaving little room for heat from the fire to escape.

== Fatalities ==
Clearance work after the accident

The locomotive driver (engineer) had been too preoccupied with his failing brakes and excessive speed to notice the absence of the cars until he reached the station at Saint Michel de Maurienne. Here he finally succeeded in stopping his locomotive and its tender. Together with some Scottish soldiers waiting to depart for Modane (two British divisions had also been sent to the Italian front in October) and railway employees from both stations, he went immediately to the accident site to assist. Their task was made more difficult by the rocky terrain where the wrecked cars lay, by the heat from the fires, and by the height of the piled-up wreckage. The station master at La Praz, seeing the train passing at an out-of-control speed, had notified the station master at the next larger station, Saint Jean de Maurienne, who held the departure of a train full of British soldiers, thereby preventing a catastrophic head-on collision.

Both the military hospital at Saint Jean de Maurienne and the Bozon-Verduraz pasta factory nearby were transformed into makeshift field hospitals and mortuaries for the victims.

Rescue teams pulled more than 424 corpses from the wreckage that could be officially identified. A further 135 could not be identified. 37 more bodies were found strewn along the ballast of the railway or the right-of-way, between La Praz and the metal bridge, belonging to soldiers who had jumped off the out-of-control train, or had been thrown off as it tossed wildly. They were interred in a communal grave next to the cemetery.

Only 183 men who had been on the train reported for roll-call on the next morning (December 13). More than 100 others either died in hospitals in the region, or while being transported to them, during the next 15 days. The stated number of fatalities varies between sources, ranging from at least 675 to about 800.

== After the accident, investigation ==
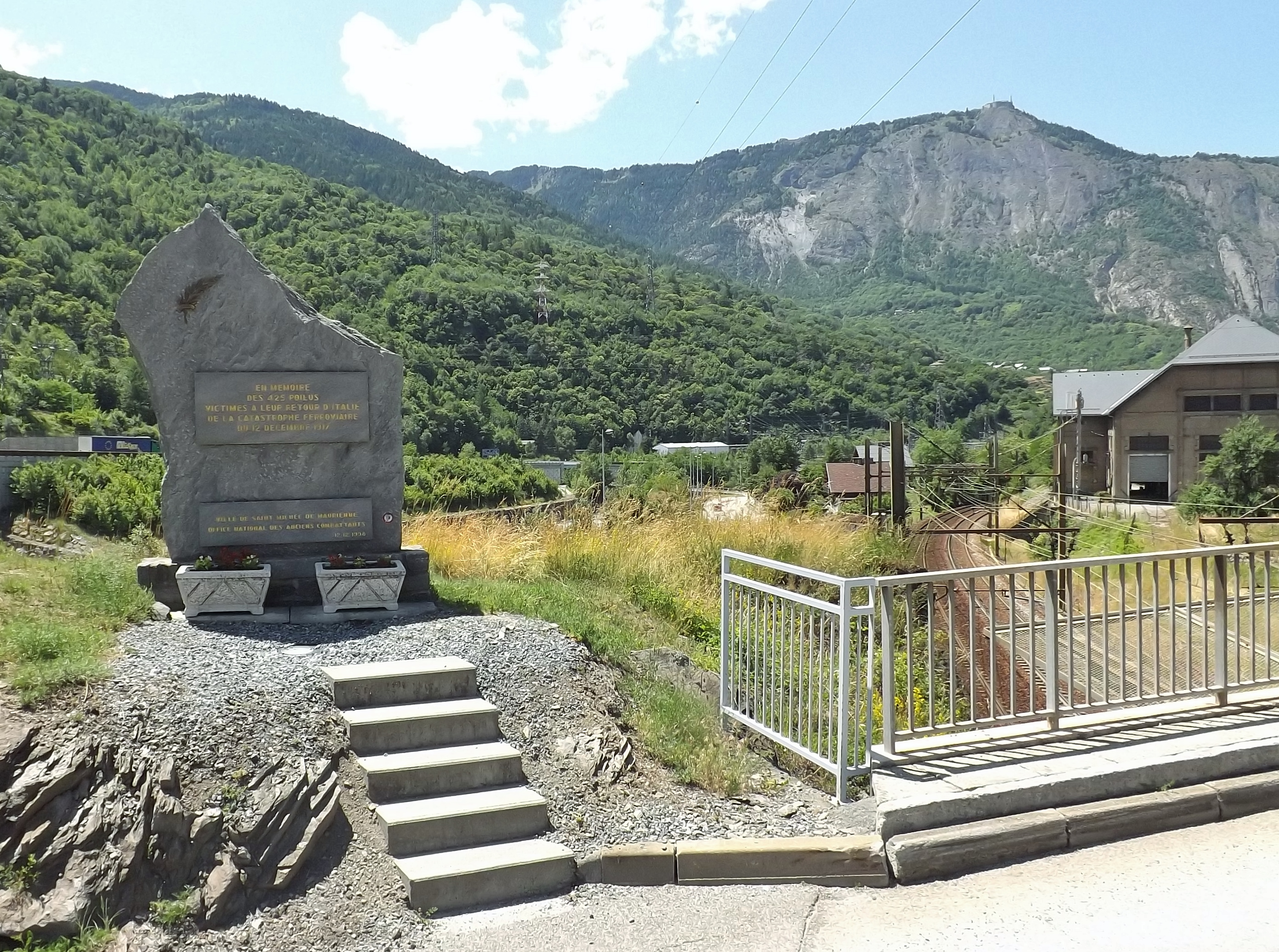
Monument at the accident site

The accident remained a classified military secret for 90 years. At the time, the French military enforced silence on the French press, which reported little or nothing about the accident because it implicated French officers. The daily Le Figaro devoted only 21 lines to the accident on December 17, four days after the accident. The military report that was eventually declassified stated:

- 435 deaths
  - 433 military deaths
    - 277 unidentified
    - 148 identified
    - 8 during their hospitalization
  - 2 civilian deaths (employees of the PLM company)
- 194 people hospitalized

A court-martial was called to try six employees of the PLM (Paris–Lyon–Mediterranée) railway. They were acquitted.

On June 6, 1923 the Minister of Defense, André Maginot, inaugurated a monument to the victims in the cemetery of Saint Michel de Maurienne. In 1961 the remains of the victims were transferred to the national military cemetery of Lyon-La Doua. On December 12, 1998 a monument was inaugurated at the La Saussaz site, near the site of the accident.

The derailment remains the greatest rail catastrophe in French history. It also remains the second greatest rail catastrophe in the entirety of world history in terms of accurately known casualties, superseded only by the 2004 Sri Lanka tsunami train wreck. This also makes the Saint-Michel-de-Maurienne derailment the deadliest railway disaster in world history that occurred as a result of an operational accident rather than being caused by a larger ongoing natural disaster.
