= Saint-Michel–Valloire station =

Railway station in France

Saint-Michel Valloire
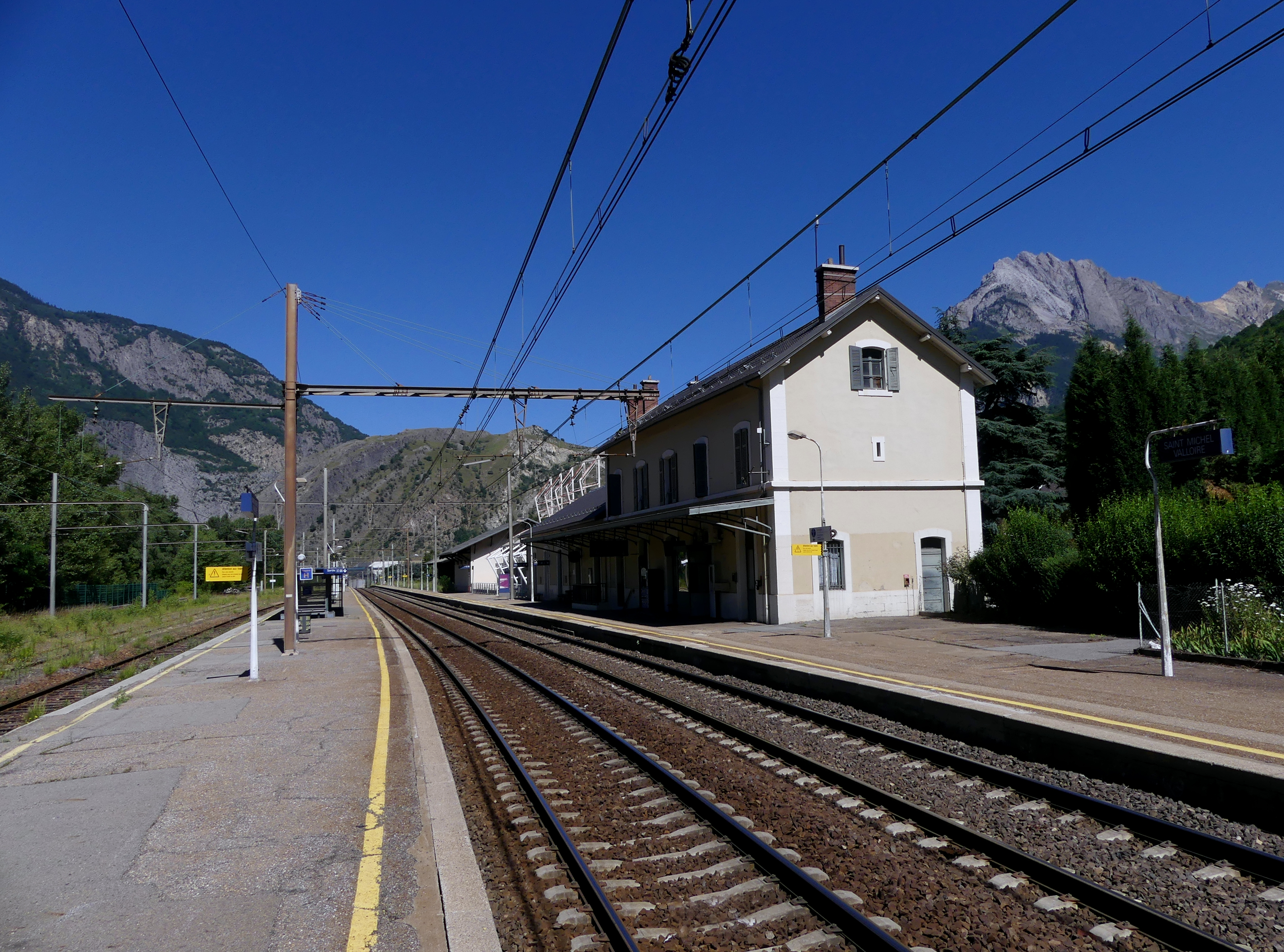
- Saint-Michel-Valloire railway station

General information
- Location: Saint-Michel-de-Maurienne, Savoie, Rhône-Alpes, France
- Coordinates: 45°13′02″N 6°28′16″E
- Line: Culoz–Modane railway
- Platforms: 2

Other information
- Station code: 87742361

History
- Opened: 17 March 1862

Services
Preceding station	TER Auvergne-Rhône-Alpes	Following station
Saint-Jean-de-Maurienne towards Chambéry	53	Modane Terminus
Location

Saint-Michel–Valloire is a railway station located in Saint-Michel-de-Maurienne, Savoie, France. The station was opened on 17 March 1862 and is located on the Culoz–Modane railway. The train services are operated by SNCF.

== Train services ==
The station is served by the following services:

- High speed services (TGV) Paris - Chambéry - Modane
- Regional services (TER Auvergne-Rhône-Alpes) Chambéry - Modane
