= Pringy, Haute-Savoie =

Pringy Prengi (Arpitan)
- Part of Annecy
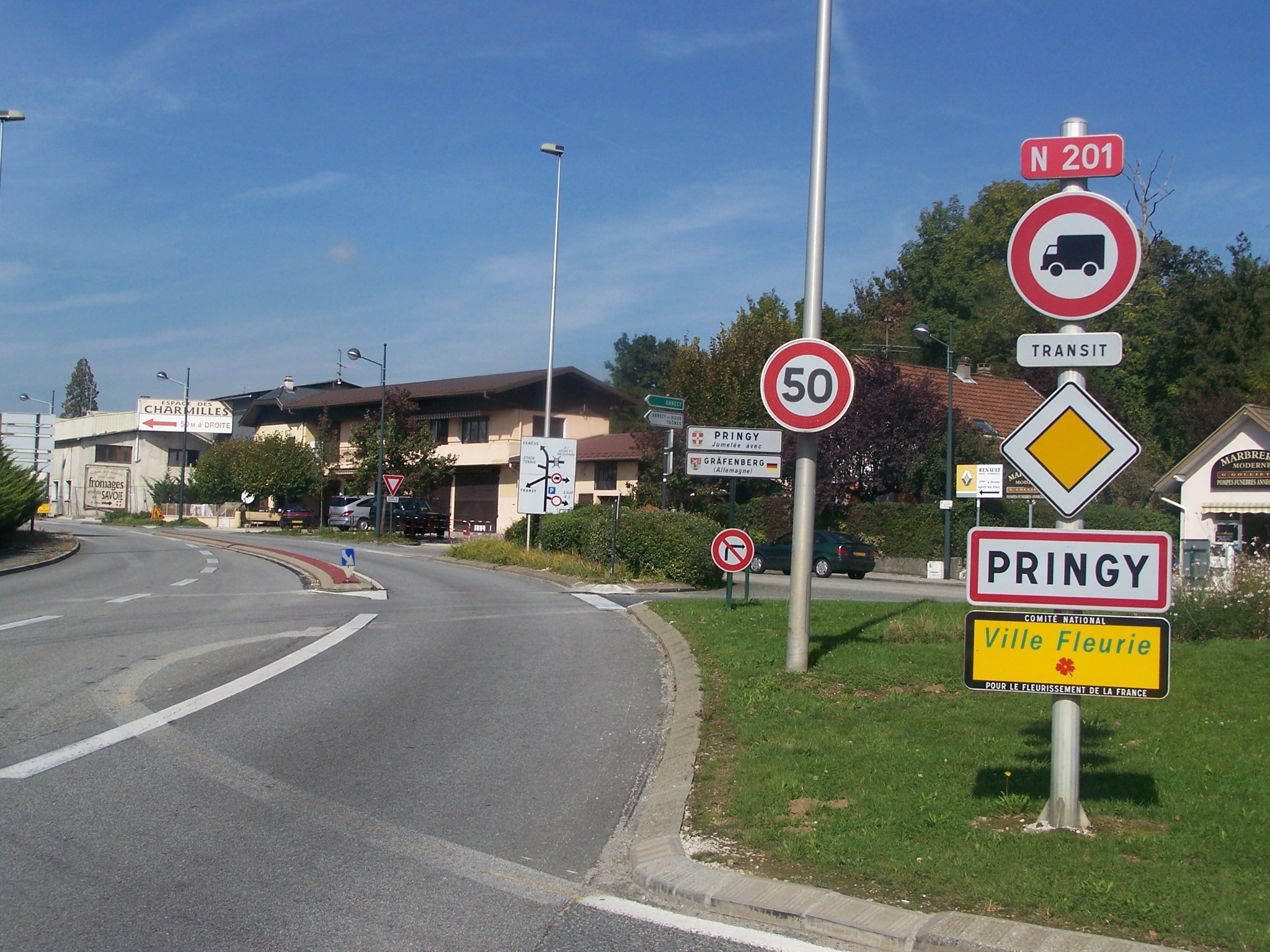
- The road into Pringy

- Coat of arms
- Location of Pringy
- Location within France Location within Auvergne-Rhône-Alpes
- Coordinates: 45°56′51″N 6°07′21″E
- Country: France
- Region: Auvergne-Rhône-Alpes
- Department: Haute-Savoie
- Arrondissement: Annecy
- Canton: Annecy-le-Vieux
- Commune: Annecy
- Area^{1}: 9.06 km^{2} (3.50 sq mi)
- Highest elevation: 860 m (2,820 ft)
- Lowest elevation: 437 m (1,434 ft)
- Population (2022): 4,792
  - Density: 529/km^{2} (1,370/sq mi)
- Demonym: Prinniaciens
- Time zone: UTC+01:00 (CET)
  - Summer (DST): UTC+02:00 (CEST)
- Postal code: 74370
- Website: Pringy74.fr
- ^{1} French Land Register data, which excludes lakes, ponds, glaciers > 1 km^{2} (0.386 sq mi or 247 acres) and river estuaries.

Pringy (French pronunciation: [pʁɛ̃ʒi]; Arpitan: Prengi) is a former commune in the Haute-Savoie department in the Auvergne-Rhône-Alpes region in south-eastern France. On 1 January 2017, it was merged into the commune Annecy.

== Geography ==
The Fier forms part of the commune's southern border.

== See also ==
- Communes of the Haute-Savoie department
