= Rumilly station =

Railway station in Rumilly, Haute-Savoie, France

Rumilly
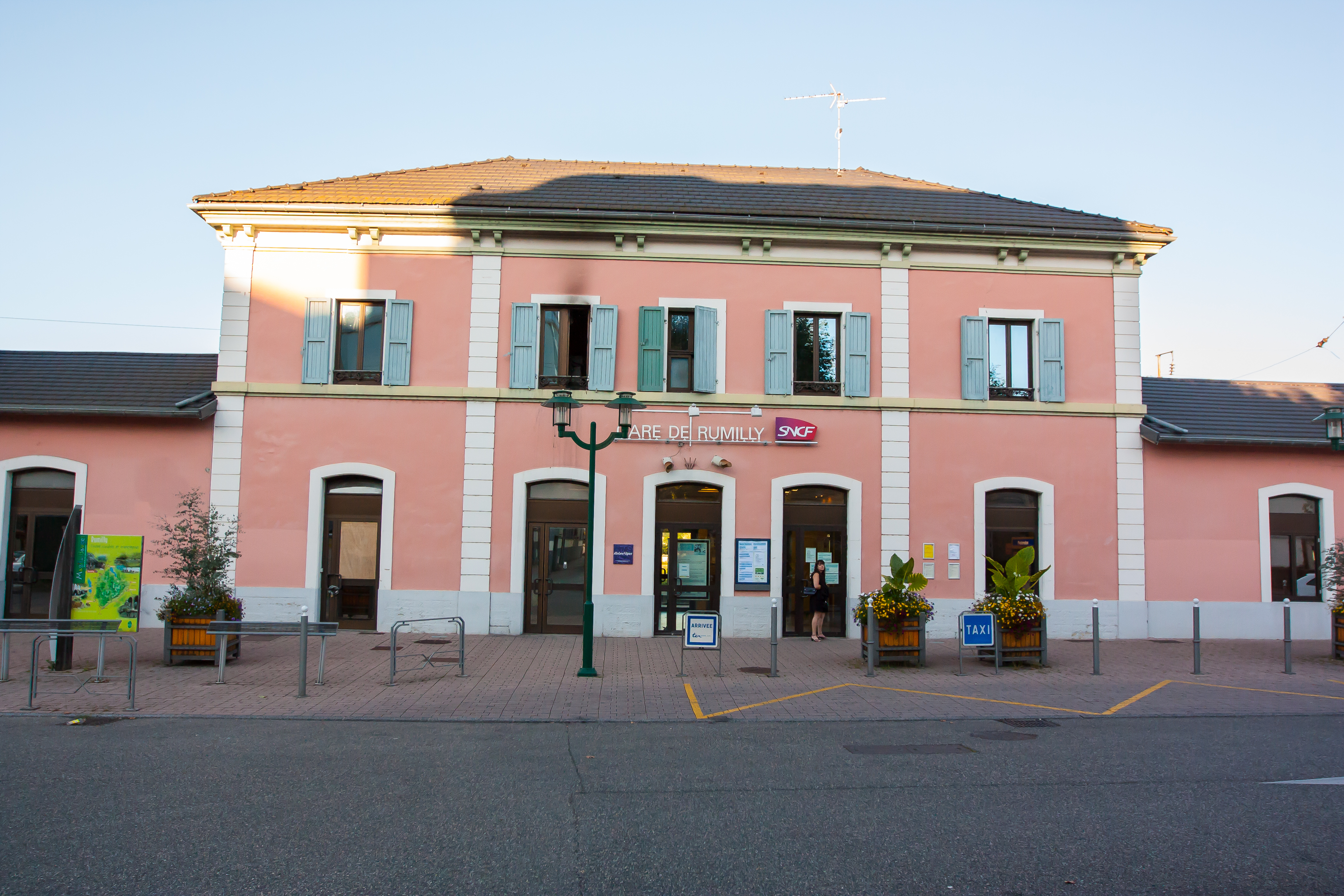
- Rumilly railway station

General information
- Location: Rumilly, Haute-Savoie, Auvergne-Rhône-Alpes, France
- Coordinates: 45°51′47″N 5°56′53″E
- Line: Aix-les-Bains–Annemasse railway
- Platforms: 2

Other information
- Station code: 87746149

History
- Opened: 1866

Passengers
- 696,431 (2023)
Services
Preceding station	TER Auvergne-Rhône-Alpes	Following station
Albens towards Valence	2	Annecy towards Annecy or Geneva
Albens towards Lyon-Part-Dieu	4	Annecy Terminus
Location

Rumilly station (French: Gare de Rumilly) is a railway station located in Rumilly, Haute-Savoie, south-eastern France. The station was opened in 1866 and is located on the Aix-les-Bains–Annemasse railway. The trains serving this station are operated by SNCF.

== Train services ==
As of 2024, trains on the following routes call at Rumilly:

- Regional trains (TER Auvergne-Rhône-Alpes) Annecy - Aix-les-Bains - Chambéry - Grenoble (- Valence)
- Regional trains (TER Auvergne-Rhône-Alpes) Annecy - Aix-les-Bains - Ambérieu - Lyon

== See also ==
- List of SNCF stations in Auvergne-Rhône-Alpes
