= Aix-les-Bains-Le Revard station =

Railway station in Aix-les-Bains, France

Aix-les-Bains-Le Revard
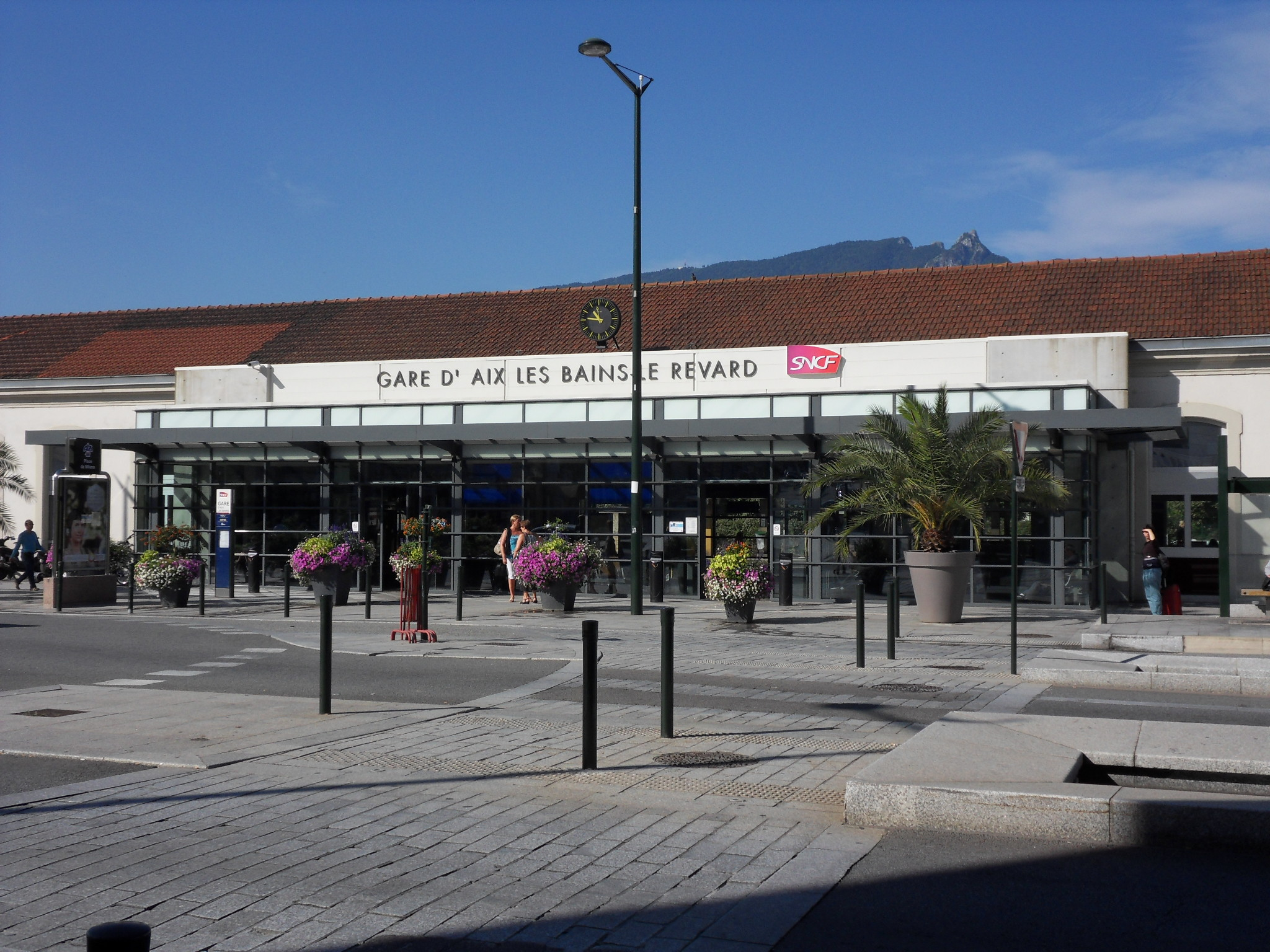
- Aix-les-Bains-Le Revard railway station

General information
- Location: Aix-les-Bains, Savoie, Auvergne-Rhône-Alpes, France
- Coordinates: 45°41′17″N 5°54′34″E
- Lines: Culoz–Modane railway Aix-les-Bains–Annemasse railway
- Platforms: 5

Other information
- Station code: 87741132

History
- Opened: 15 December 1856; 169 years ago

Passengers
- 2024: 1,871,354
Services
Preceding station	SNCF	Following station
Chambéry towards Paris-Lyon	TGV inOui	Annecy Terminus
Preceding station	TER Auvergne-Rhône-Alpes	Following station
Chambéry towards Valence	2	Culoz towards Geneva
Chambéry towards Valence	2	Rumilly towards Annecy
Ambérieu towards Lyon-Part-Dieu	4	Rumilly towards Annecy
Culoz towards Lyon-Part-Dieu	35	Chambéry Terminus
Grésy-sur-Aix towards Annecy	50	Chambéry Terminus
Viviers-du-Lac towards Chambéry	51	Chindrieux towards Geneva
Location

Aix-les-Bains ([ɛks le bɛ̃]), officially Aix-les-Bains-Le Revard ([lə ʁəvaʁ]), is a railway station located in Aix-les-Bains, Savoie, southeastern France. The station was opened in 1856 and is located on the Culoz–Modane railway and Aix-les-Bains–Annemasse railway. The train services are operated by SNCF.

== Train services ==
The following services call at Aix-les-Bains-Le Revard As of 2022:

- High speed services (TGV) Paris - Chambéry - Aix-les-Bains - Annecy
- Regional services (TER Auvergne-Rhône-Alpes) Lyon - Ambérieu - Aix-les-Bains - Annecy
- Regional services (TER Auvergne-Rhône-Alpes) Geneva - Bellegarde - Aix-les-Bains - Chambéry - Grenoble
- Regional services (TER Auvergne-Rhône-Alpes) Annecy - Aix-les-Bains - Chambéry - Grenoble (- Valence)
- Local services (TER Auvergne-Rhône-Alpes) (Lyon -) Ambérieu - Aix-les-Bains - Chambéry
