= Annecy station =

Railway station in Annecy, France

Annecy
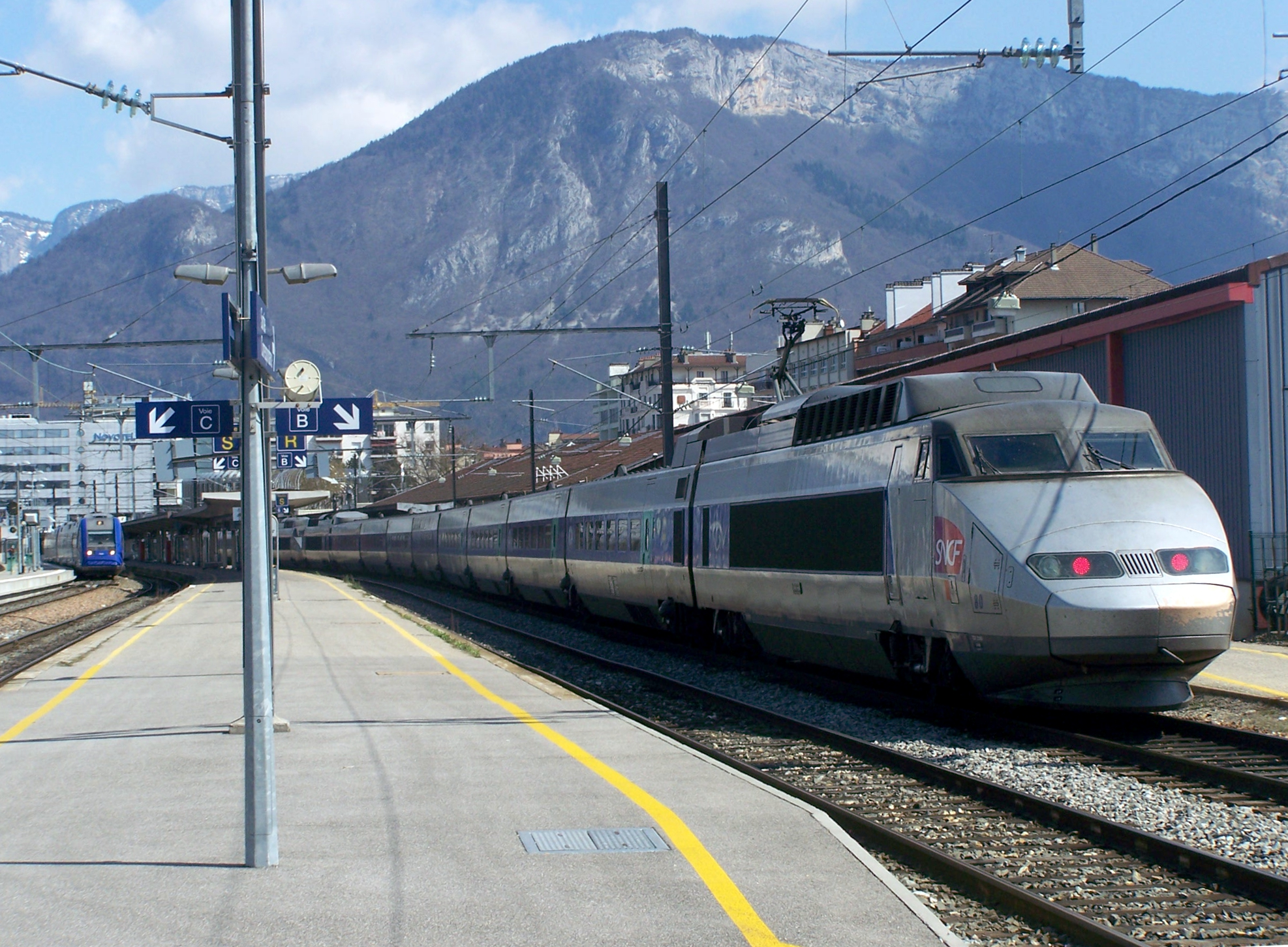
- A TGV train at Annecy station

General information
- Location: Place de la Gare; 74000 Annecy; Haute-Savoie; France
- Coordinates: 45°54′8″N 6°7′18″E
- Owner: SNCF
- Operator: SNCF
- Lines: Aix-les-Bains–Annemasse; Annecy–Albertville (closed in 1966)
- Platforms: 5

History
- Opened: 5 July 1866

Passengers
- 2024: 3,202,251

Services
Preceding station	SNCF	Following station
Aix-les-Bains-Le Revard towards Paris-Lyon	TGV inOui	Terminus
Preceding station	Léman Express	Following station
Terminus	L2	Pringy towards Coppet
Preceding station	TER Auvergne-Rhône-Alpes	Following station
Rumilly towards Valence	2	Terminus
Rumilly towards Lyon-Part-Dieu	4	Terminus
Terminus	43	Pringy towards Saint-Gervais
Terminus	50	Rumilly towards Chambéry
Location
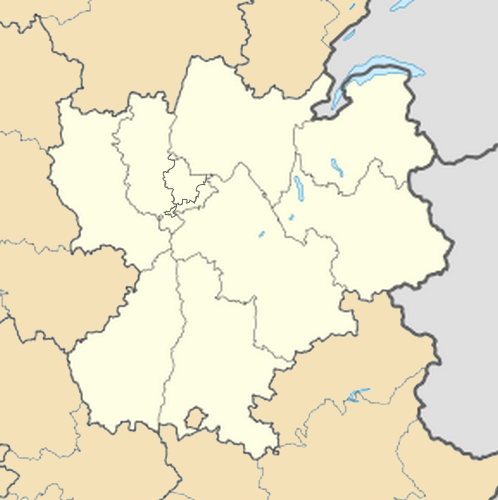
- Location within Auvergne-Rhône-Alpes Location within Rhône-Alpes Location within France

Annecy ([an(ə)si]; French: Gare d'Annecy) is the main railway station in Annecy, Haute-Savoie, southeastern France. The station was opened in 1866 and is located on the Aix-les-Bains–Annemasse railway and the former Annecy–Albertville railway, part of which is now used as a bike path along Lake Annecy. The trains serving this station are operated by SNCF and CFF (the latter for the Léman Express service). In December 2012 a new multimodal interchange between bus routes and the train station was opened.

== Train services ==
As of 2022, trains on the following routes call at Annecy:

High speed trains

- TGV inOui: Annecy – Aix-les-Bains-Le Revard – Chambéry–Challes-les-Eaux – Paris-Lyon

Regional trains

- TER Auvergne-Rhône-Alpes: Annecy – Aix-les-Bains-Le Revard – Chambéry–Challes-les-Eaux – Grenoble (– Valence-Ville)
- TER Auvergne-Rhône-Alpes: Annecy – Aix-les-Bains – Ambérieu-en-Bugey – Lyon-Part-Dieu

Local trains

- TER Auvergne-Rhône-Alpes: Annecy – La Roche-sur-Foron – Saint-Gervais-les-Bains-Le Fayet
- Léman Express L2: Annecy – La Roche-sur-Foron – Annemasse – Genève-Cornavin – Coppet

== See also ==
- List of SNCF stations in Auvergne-Rhône-Alpes
