= Culoz–Modane railway =

Railway in France

Coordinates: 45.5491°N 6.2974°E

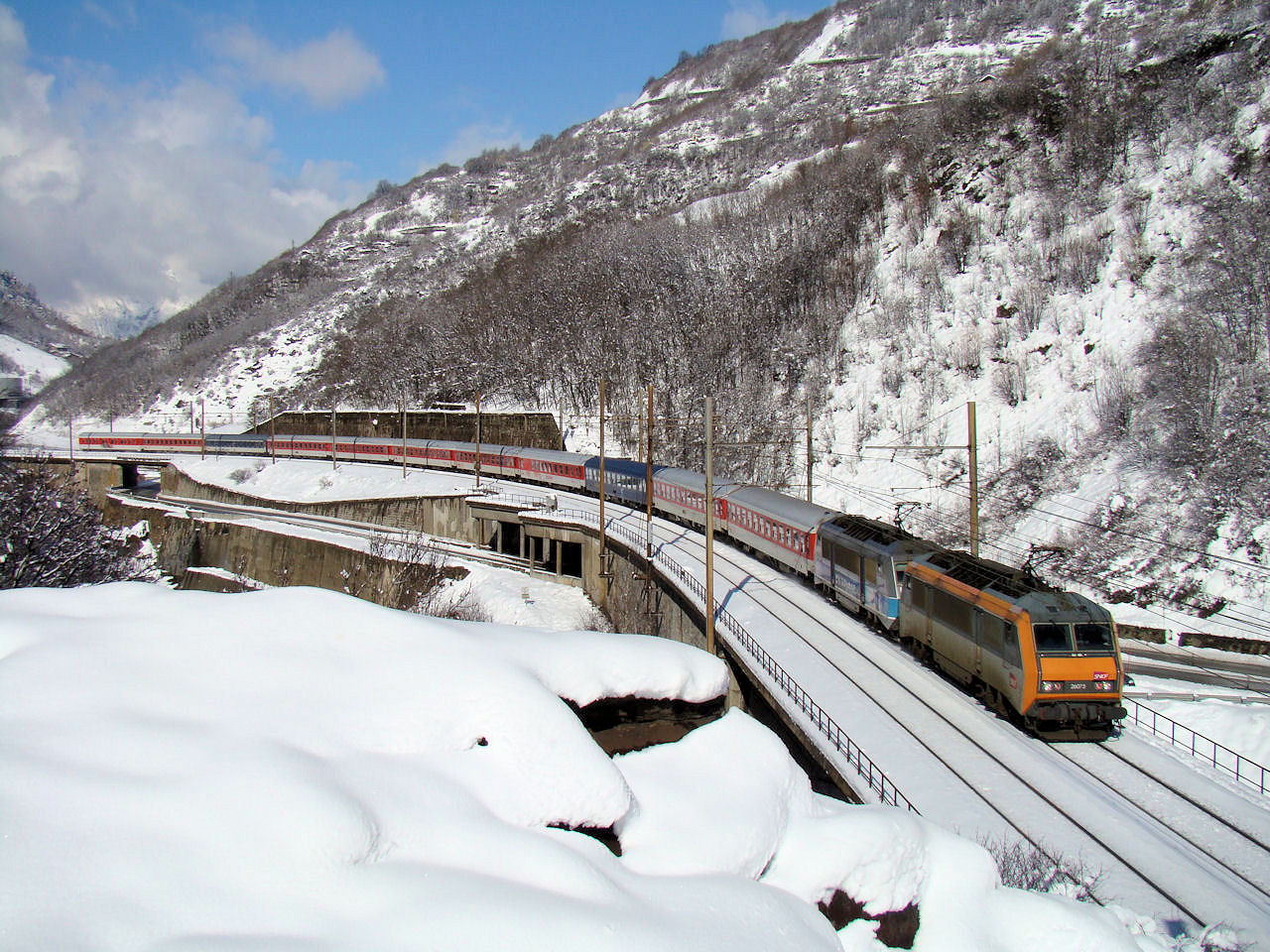

Overview
- Status: Operational
- Owner: SNCF
- Locale: France (Auvergne-Rhône-Alpes)
- Termini: Culoz station; Modane station

Service
- System: SNCF
- Operator(s): SNCF

History
- Opened: 1856-1871

Technical
- Line length: 135 km (84 mi)
- Number of tracks: Double track
- Track gauge: 1,435 mm (4 ft 8 1/2 in) standard gauge
- Electrification: 1,500 V DC

The Culoz–Modane railway (sometimes called Ligne de la Maurienne) is a 135 kilometres (84 miles) long railway running from Culoz, near Chambéry, through Saint-Jean-de-Maurienne to Modane in France. Together with the Italian Turin–Modane railway it is often called "Fréjus Railway" or "Mont Cenis Railway".

Despite running under the Fréjus Pass, it is sometimes called the Mont Cenis Railway because, from antiquity until the Fréjus Rail Tunnel was opened in 1871, most people used the Mont Cenis Pass to get between France and Italy. From 1868 to 1871 the temporary Mont Cenis Pass Railway ran over the Mont Cenis pass to link the French and Italian railways.

The Culoz–Modane railway is owned and operated by the SNCF, and the line from Modane to Turin that connects with it is operated by FS.

== History ==
The Victor Emmanuel Railway, which included both the Culoz–Modane railway across Savoy and the Turin–Modane railway across Piedmont, was largely built in the 1850s by the Kingdom of Sardinia and named after its king, Victor Emmanuel II. The section between Culoz and Saint-Jean-de-Maurienne was opened between 1856 and 1858.

Until 1860 Sardinia included both Savoy and Piedmont. Then however, ownership of Savoy and the County of Nice passed to France. In 1862 the Culoz–Modane railway became part of the Paris-Lyon-Marseille Railway and the line was extended to Saint-Michel-de-Maurienne. The remaining section between Saint-Michel and Modane and the tunnel towards Italy were opened on 16 October 1871.

On 12 December 1917, a troop train derailed at speed at Saint-Michel-de-Maurienne killing several hundred soldiers; see Saint-Michel-de-Maurienne derailment.

== Description ==
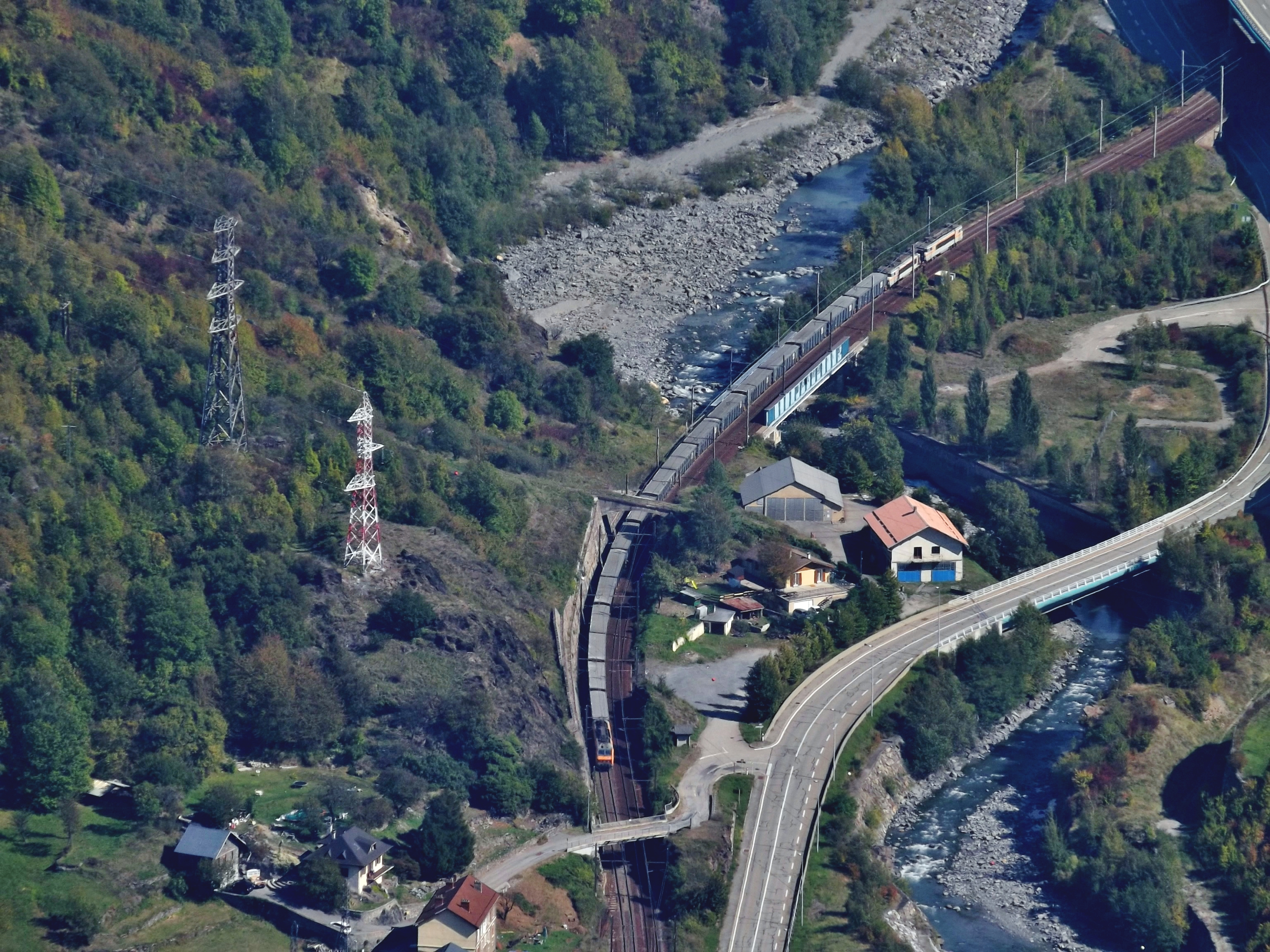
Freight train on the line crossing the Arc

The 20-kilometre-long (12 mi) section between St. Michel to Modane on the north side of the Mont Cenis Tunnel has a maximum inclination (gradient) of 3%, an average inclination of 2.1% and a smallest curvature radius of 350 metres (1,150 ft). The erection of support structures in difficult areas with danger from landslides, and of tunnels with a total length of 4,624 metres (15,171 ft) was necessary. The 41-kilometre-long (25 mi) section between Bardonecchia and the south terminus of the Mont Cenis Tunnel has a maximum inclination of 3 per cent, an average inclination of 2.05% and a smallest curvature of radius of 450 metres (1,480 ft). On this section 18 bridges and 26 tunnels with a total length of 8,115 metres (26,624 ft) were built.

In 1925 the railway between Modane and Chambéry was electrified with 1.5 kV DC, using a third rail. This was the highest voltage ever used on a third rail system in Europe. In 1976 the third rail was replaced by an overhead wire.

== See also ==
- The Saint-Michel-de-Maurienne derailment on 12 December 1917 is the worst train accident to have occurred in France.
- Mont Cenis Pass Railway, a railway built as a temporary link before the complete opening of the Fréjus railway (Culoz-Modane-Turin)
- Alpine rolling road, a piggy back service carrying trucks with or without tractors from Aiton to Orbassano.
