= Aix-les-Bains–Annemasse railway =

Railway line in France

Aix-les-Bains–Annemasse
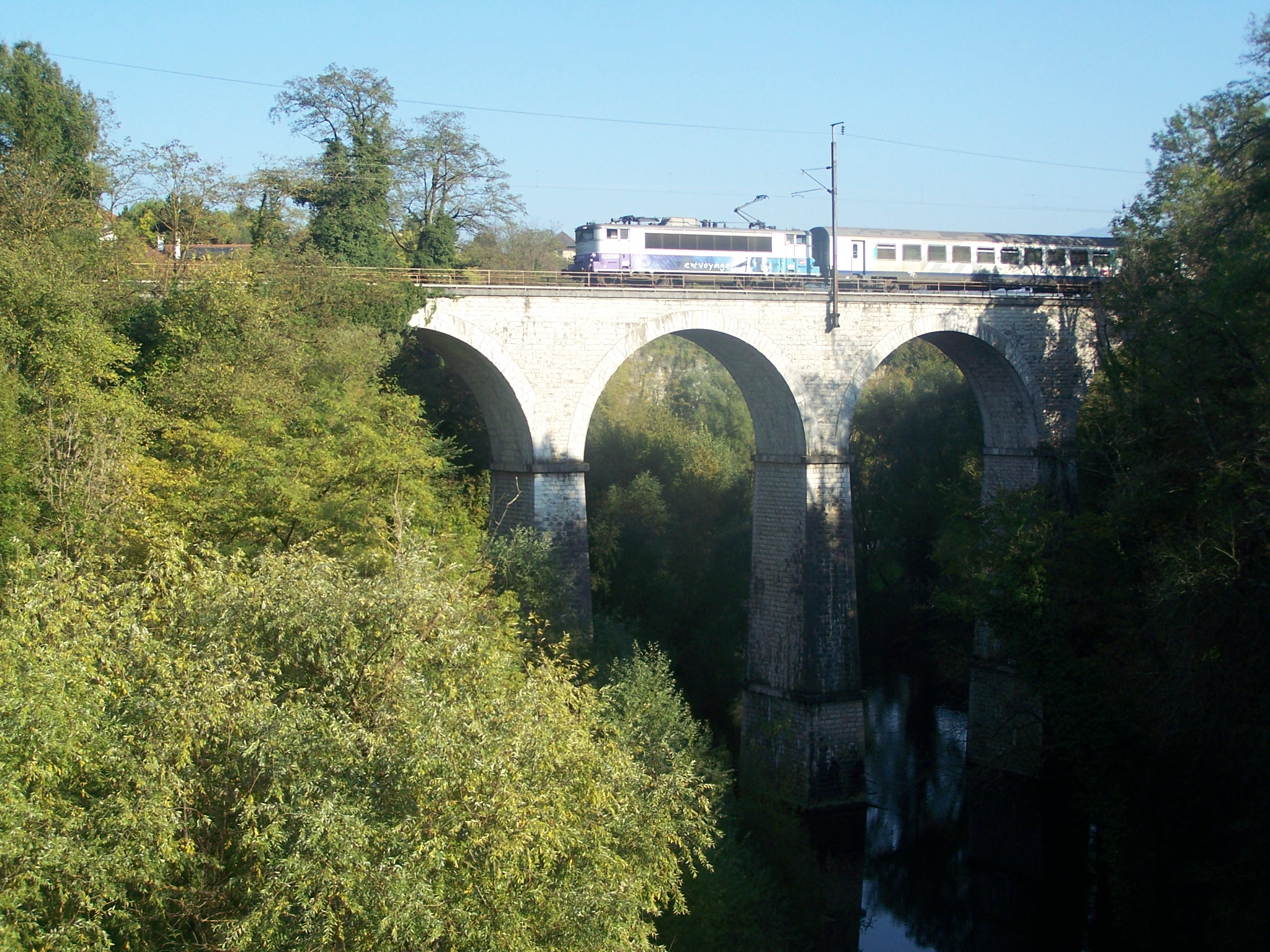
- A French regional train crosses the Chéran river after leaving Rumilly and moving towards Annecy in Haute-Savoie.

Overview
- Owner: SNCF
- Termini: Aix-les-Bains-Le Revard; Annemasse

Service
- Route number: 897 000 (SNCF)

Technical
- Line length: 94.6 km (58.8 mi)
- Track gauge: 1,435 mm (4 ft 8 1/2 in) standard gauge
- Electrification: 25 kV 50 Hz

The Aix-les-Bains–Annemasse railway is a railway line in the Auvergne-Rhône-Alpes region of France. It runs 94.6 kilometres (58.8 mi) from Aix-les-Bains to Annemasse.
