= Nicasius of Die =

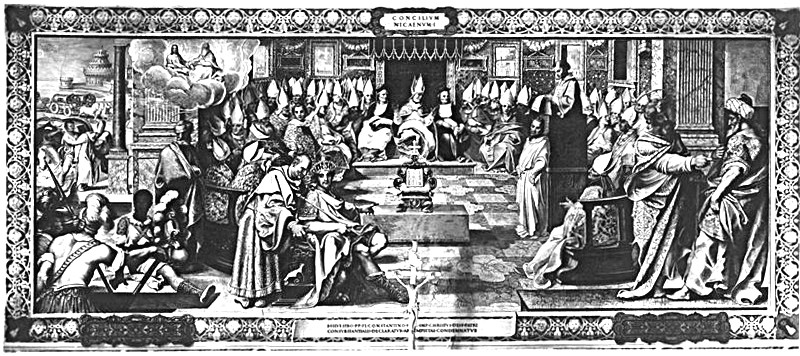
Fresco depicting the First Council of Nicaea.

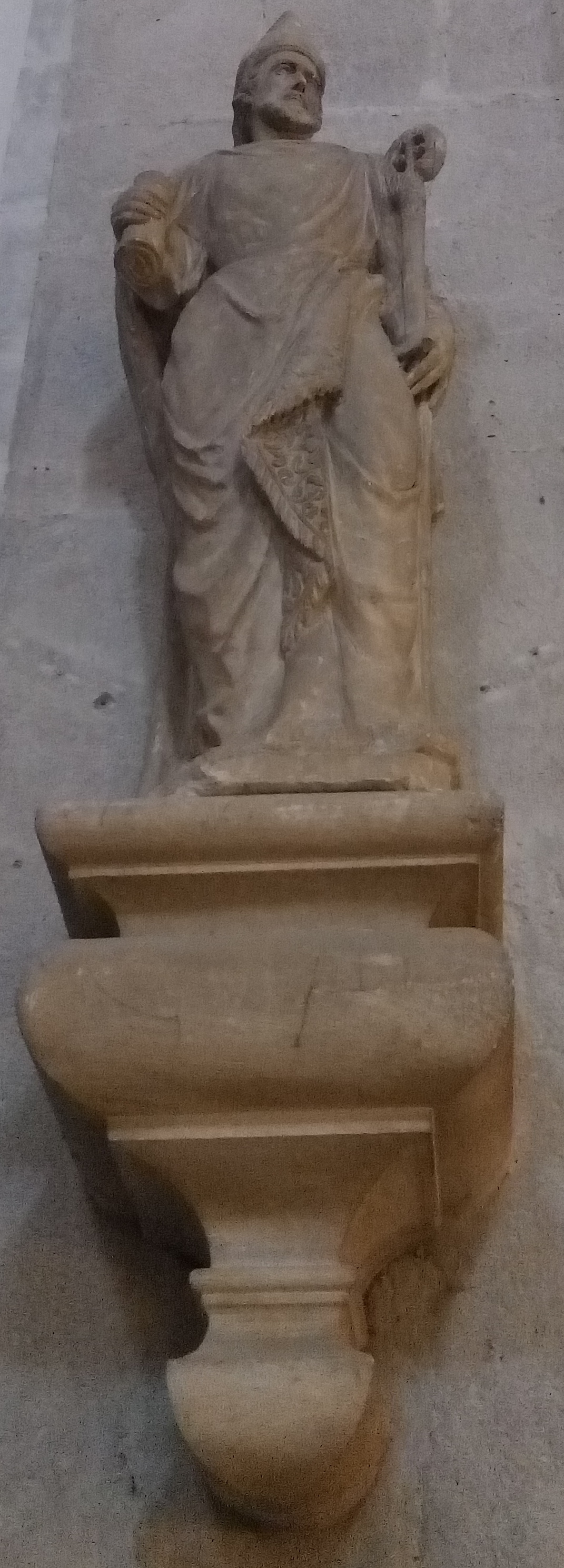
Statue of Nicasius of Die in Die Cathedral.

Nicasius of Die (4th century) was a 4th-century bishop from Gaul, present-day France. As Bishop of Die he is notable to history as one of only five Catholic bishops from the Western part of the Roman Empire who attended the First Council of Nicaea in 325.

== Sainthood ==
Alternatively known as bishop Nicaise of Die, he is also considered a Saint in the Roman Catholic Church with a feast day celebrated on 20 March and in the Eastern Orthodox Church, is celebrated on the "Sunday of the Fathers of the first Council".

== Bishopric ==
Nicaise was the earliest attested Bishop of Bishop of Die, Drôme. although the largely discredited 17th century historian Polycarpe de la Rivière says he was the successor to St Mars of Die bishop c. 220, and then St Higer. These prior bishops are not known from other sources.

The same Polycarpe claims to have found in a life of St Marcel de Die, a letter from the Council of Nicaea for Nicaise to give to the bishops of Gaules. In this, no trace has ever been found of this letter.

== Attendance at Nicaea ==
At first glance Nicaise was an unlikely attendee at the Council of Nicaea. The Latin churches were represented by only four delegations, of Die, of Rome, of Carthage and that of Cordoba (whose bishop Hosius, was the adviser of the emperor Constantine). We see that these four seats were not random, they represent the four regions of the West: Italy, Africa, Spain (Iberia) and Gaul. It should have been expect that Gauls' Bishops send their primate the archbishop of Lyon, Maxime (or Tetrad). Instead they sent the bishop of a small and obscure bishopric. It has been conjectured that the primate was unavailable due to health or age and Nicaise, having Greek parents was chosen for his knowledge of Greek.

== Burial ==
According to Lenain Tillemont, in the eleventh century Die Cathedral would have housed the relics of Nicaise.
