= Remparts de Die =

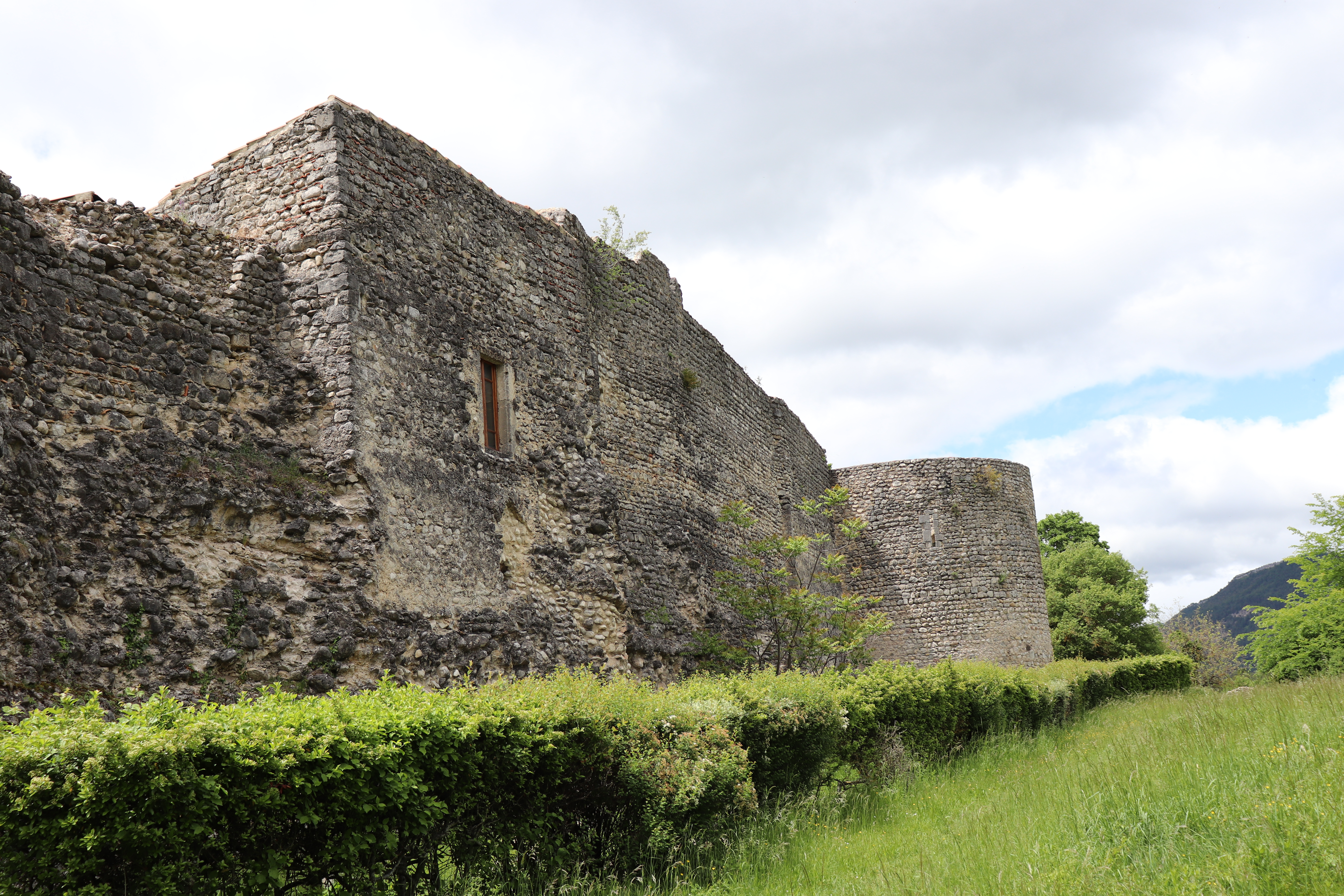
Segment of the walls to the east of Die

The Walls of Die (Drôme) consists of towers and walls dating to the Roman era, which are estimated to have been built in the 2nd century. They are the only Roman monuments still standing in the department of Drôme, France.

Many segments of the walls were classified as historical monuments in 1921 and 1922.

== Description ==
The walls are composed of the following elements :

- A round tower situated next to 24 boulevard du Gagnard: classified on 13 October 1921.
- A square tower and part of the adjacent curtain wall, to the east of the city situated on boulevard du Gagnard below the street leading to the Hôtel de Ville : classified on 13 October 1921.
- Northern segments of the walls between the hospital and a place called les Fondeaux: classified om 14 December 1922.

The walls remained intact until the Middle Ages and throughout the French Wars of Religion. In the 17th century, bastions were added of which some vestiges remain. From 1820 onwards the walls lost their defensive utility and many segments were demolished to create space for the city to grow, and to serve as a source of stone.

With the weathering of time some segments of the walls have begun to sink. In 2011, landslides occurred on the rue de la Citadelle, which forced the closure of a parking lot at the entrance of the hospital. Reinforcements were made to stabilized the deteriorated wall.

=== The Walls ===
The extent of the walls measure 2 km long, enclosing an area of 27 hectares. The walls are 4 m thick and 8 m high. There are about 60 guard towers, in diverse forms: square, semi-circular, and even seven-sided (a unique form in the Roman World).

The walls and towers were built with materials recycled from older buildings, including slabs, columns, and cut stones.

=== The Porte Saint-Marcel ===
The Porte Saint-Marcel dates to the 3rd and 4th century. The gate was named in honour of a 5th bishop, Marcel de Die, who was buried in La Roquette (nearMontmeyan).

In the Middle Ages, ramparts were added to improve the defenses, as well as a drawbridge and battlements. It is now faced as well by a monumental gate supported by two semi-circular towers.

== Gallery ==
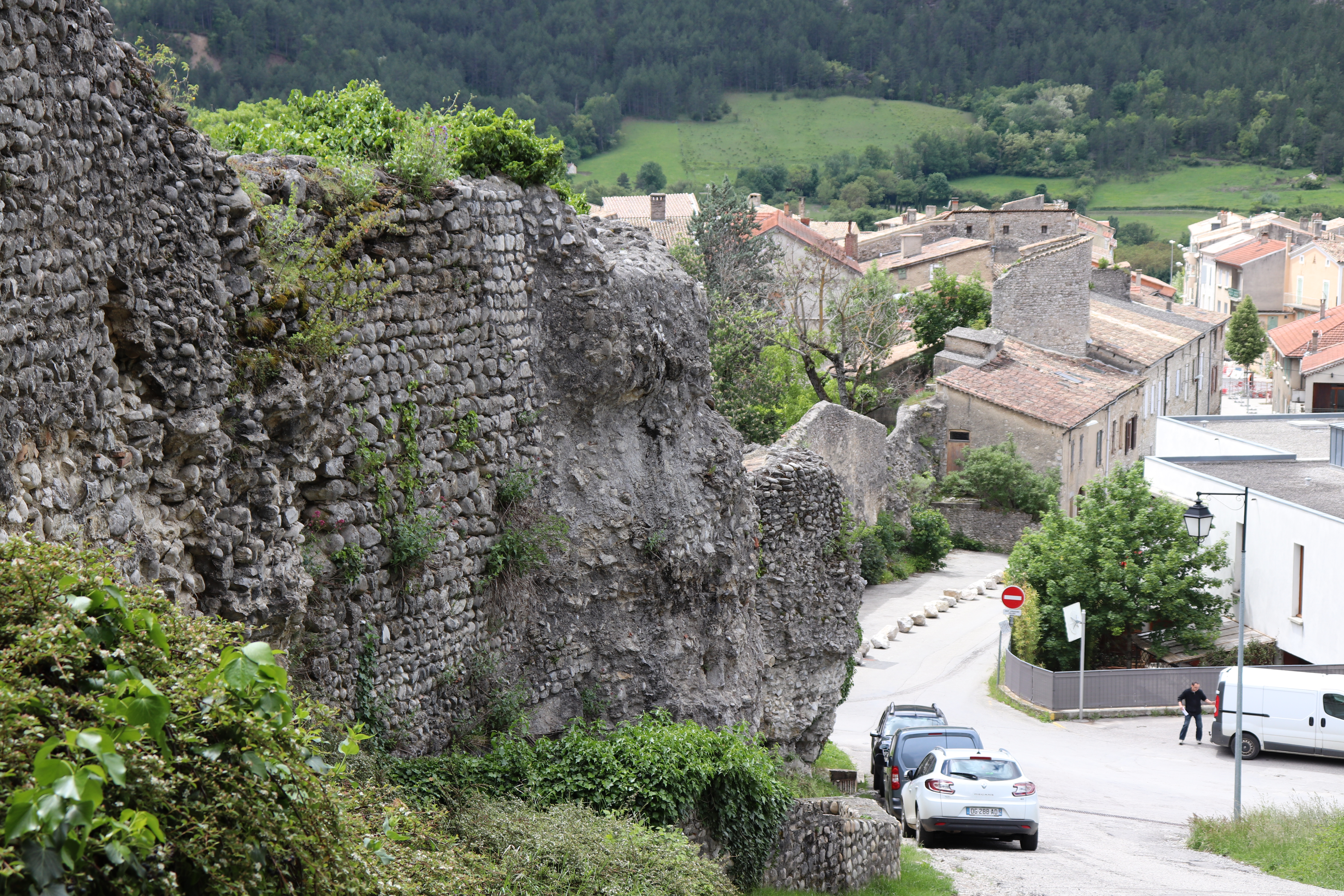
North Zone of the Walls

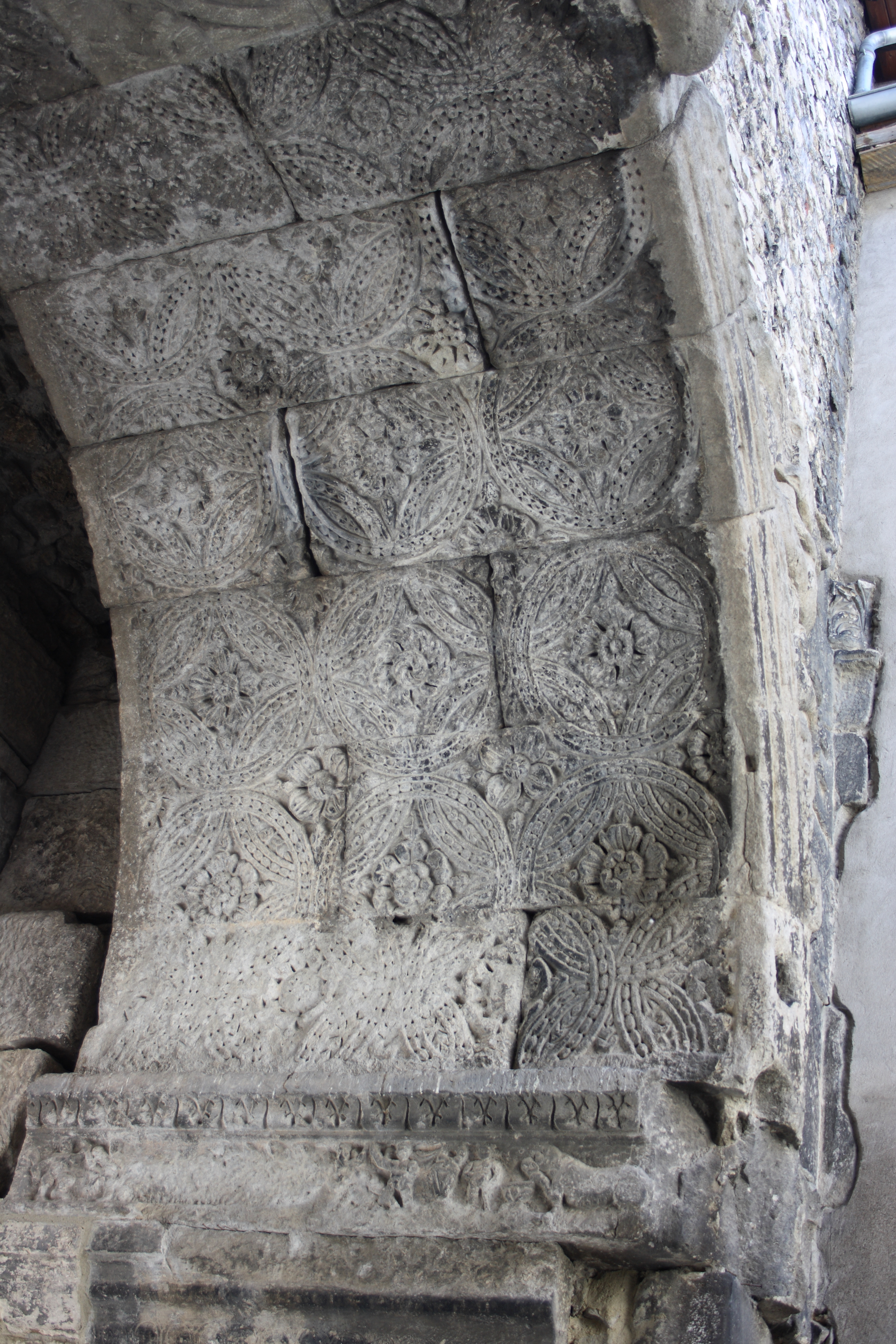
Detail of the Porte Saint-Michel

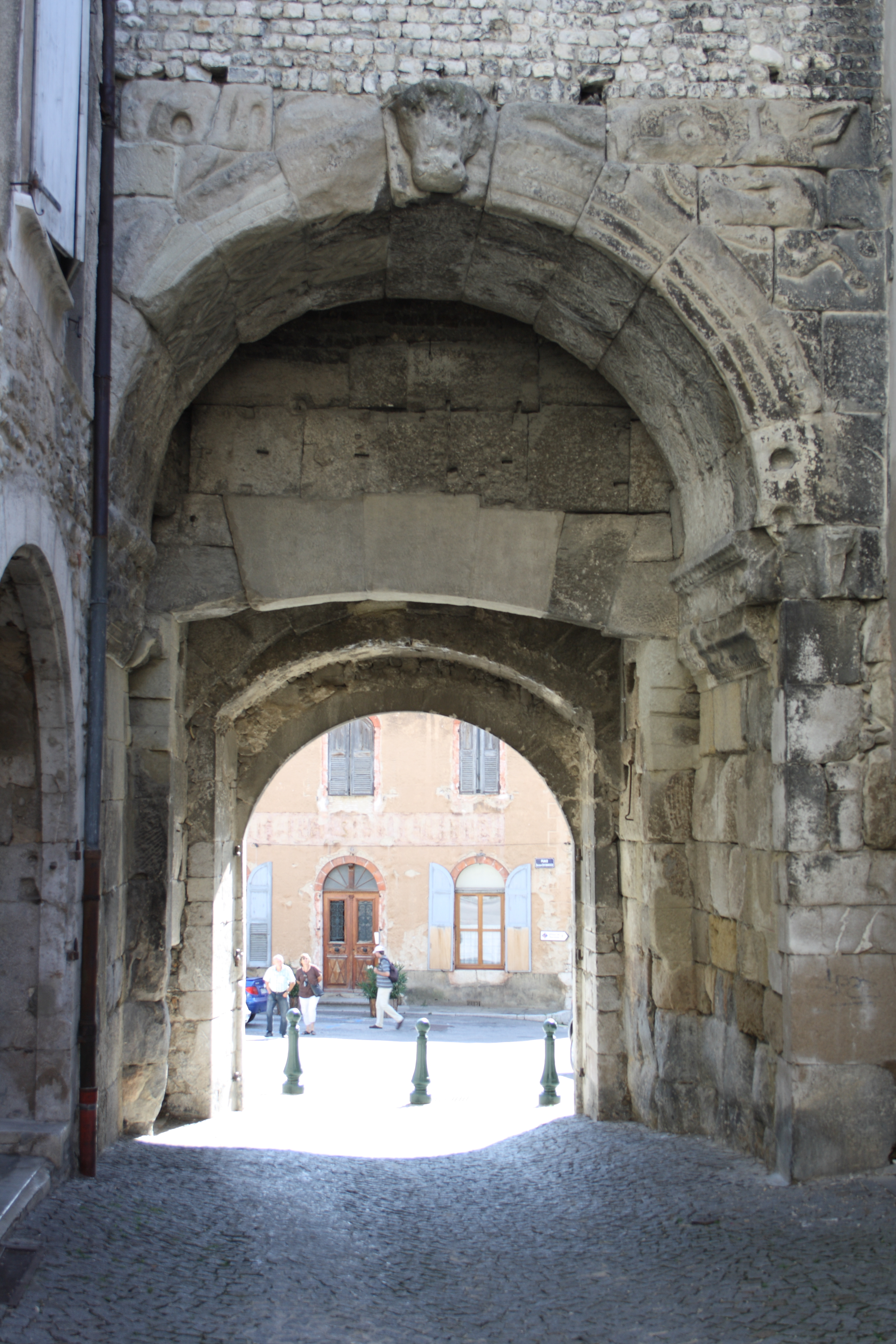
Porte Saint-Marcel viewed from inside the city

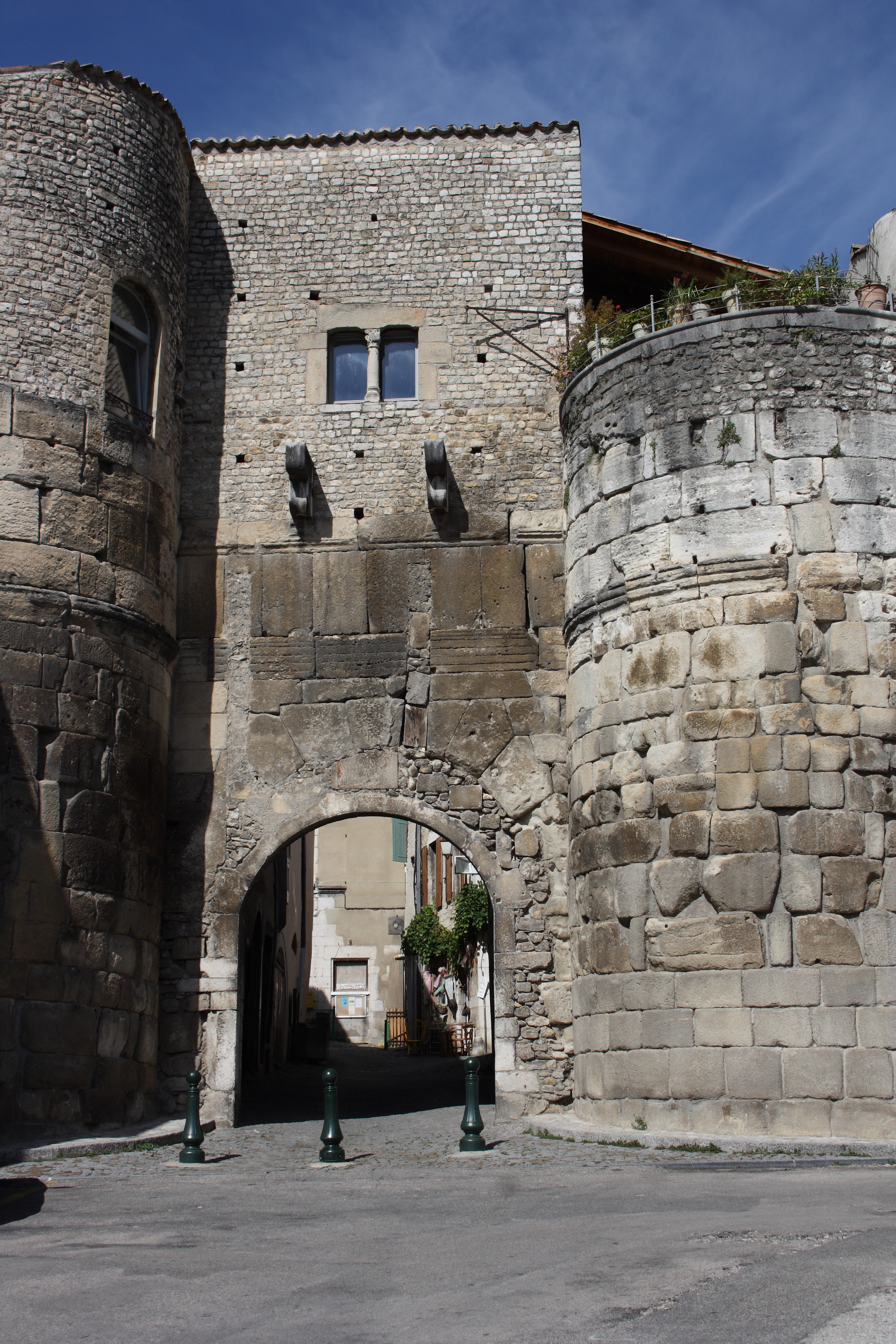
The Porte Saint-Michel from the exterior

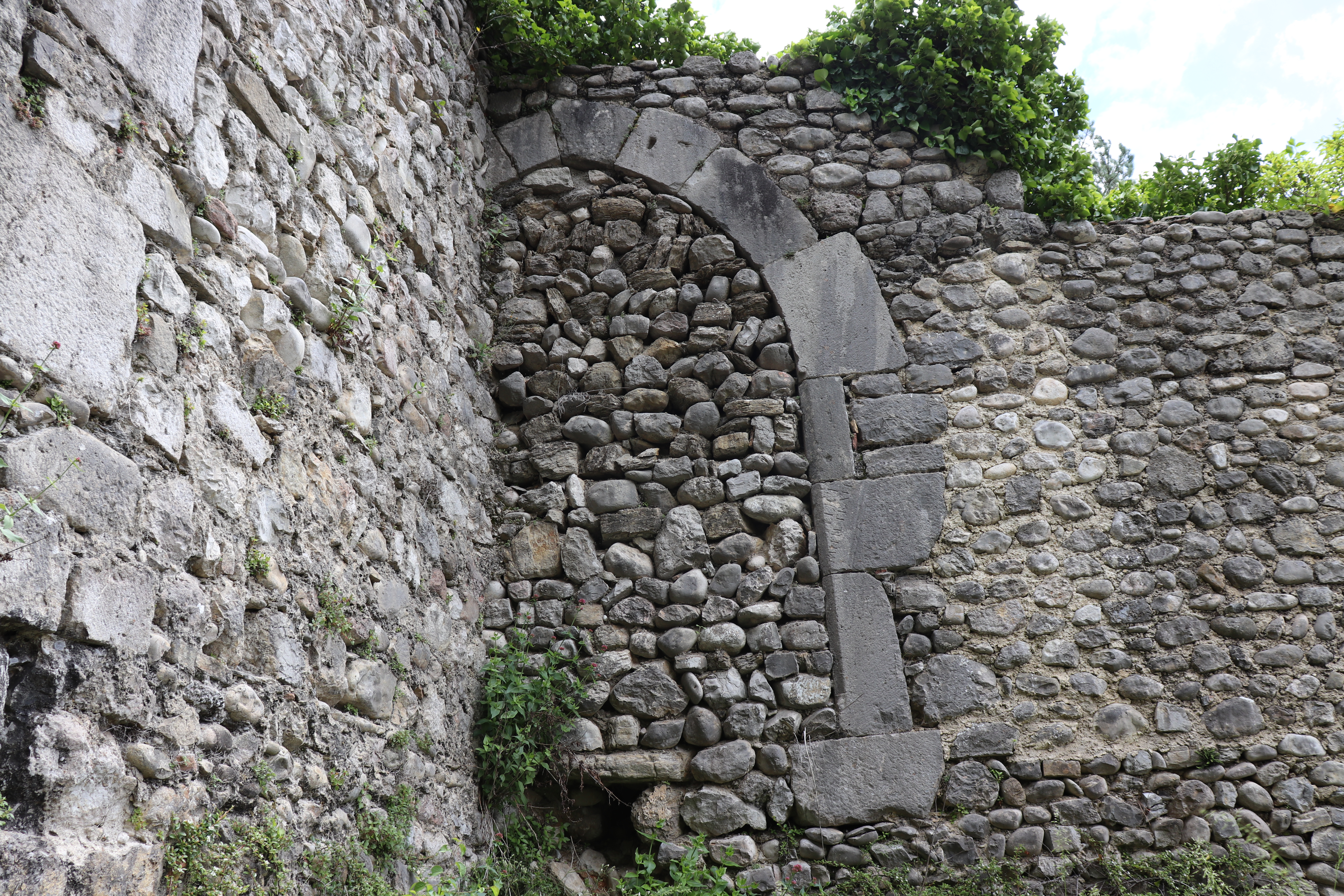
A walled-up door
