= Die, Drôme =

Die Diá (Occitan)
- Subprefecture and commune
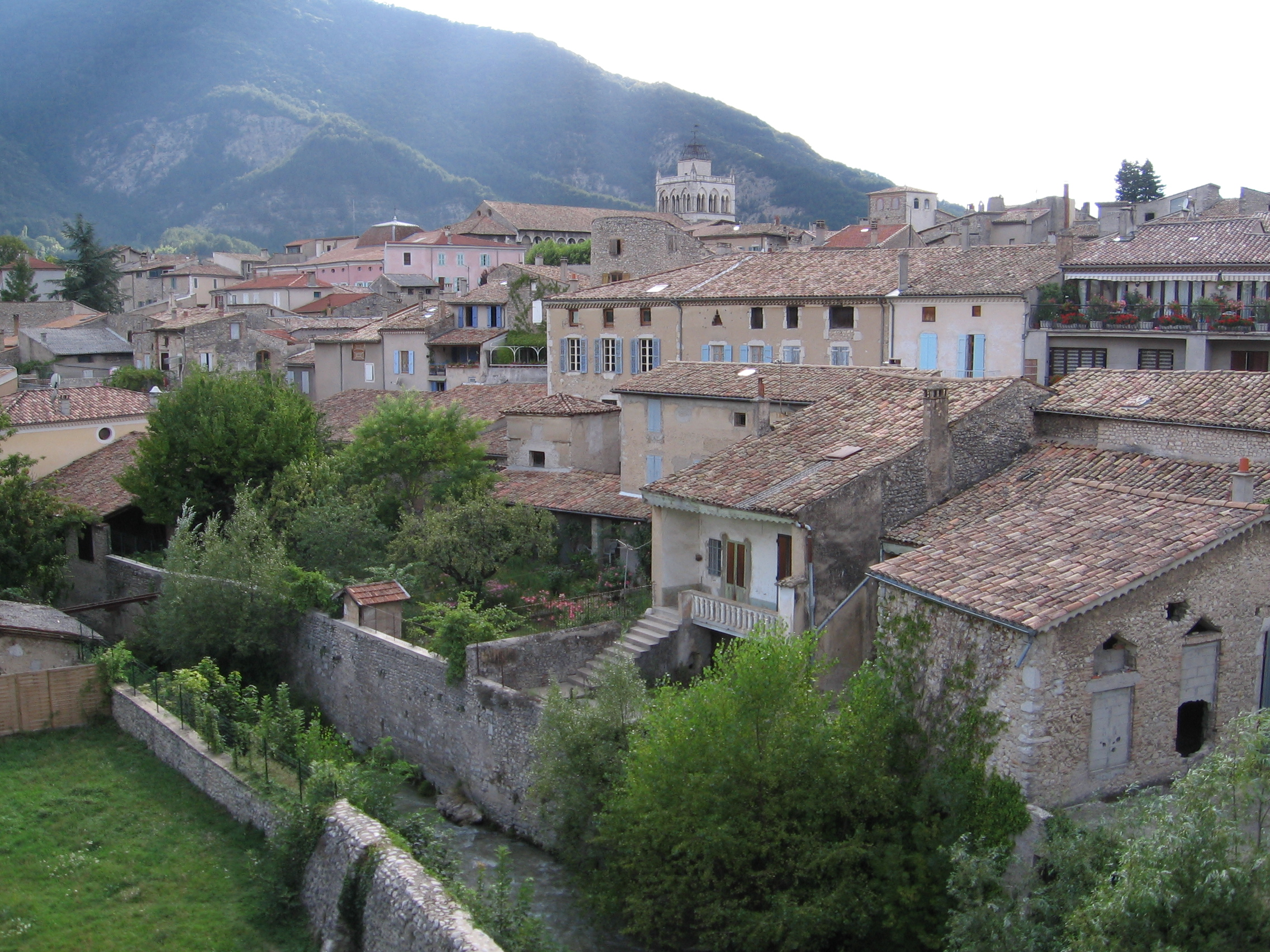
- A general view of Die

- Coat of arms
- Location of Die
- Location within France Location within Auvergne-Rhône-Alpes
- Coordinates: 44°45′13″N 5°22′13″E
- Country: France
- Region: Auvergne-Rhône-Alpes
- Department: Drôme
- Arrondissement: Die
- Canton: Le Diois
- Intercommunality: CC du Diois

Government
  - Mayor (2020–2026): Isabelle Bizouard
- Area^{1}: 57.28 km^{2} (22.12 sq mi)
- Elevation: 410 m (1,350 ft)
- Highest elevation: 1,841 m (6,040 ft)
- Lowest elevation: 367 m (1,204 ft)
- Population (2023): 4,844
  - Density: 84.57/km^{2} (219.0/sq mi)
- Demonym: Diois
- Time zone: UTC+01:00 (CET)
  - Summer (DST): UTC+02:00 (CEST)
- INSEE/Postal code: 26113 /26150
- ^{1} French Land Register data, which excludes lakes, ponds, glaciers > 1 km^{2} (0.386 sq mi or 247 acres) and river estuaries.

Die (French: [di]; Vivaro-Alpine: Diá [djɔ]; Arpitan: Dia [dja]) is a commune, a former episcopal see, and a subprefecture of the Drôme department in southeastern France. The region around Die is known as the Diois [fr] (Vivaro-Alpine: Diés; Arpitan: Diês).

Die is perhaps best known for its sparkling wine Clairette de Die. It was a county in the High Middle Ages and was once the see of a Roman Catholic diocese with its church serving as a cathedral. Die has several historic monuments encircled by Gallo-Roman city walls.

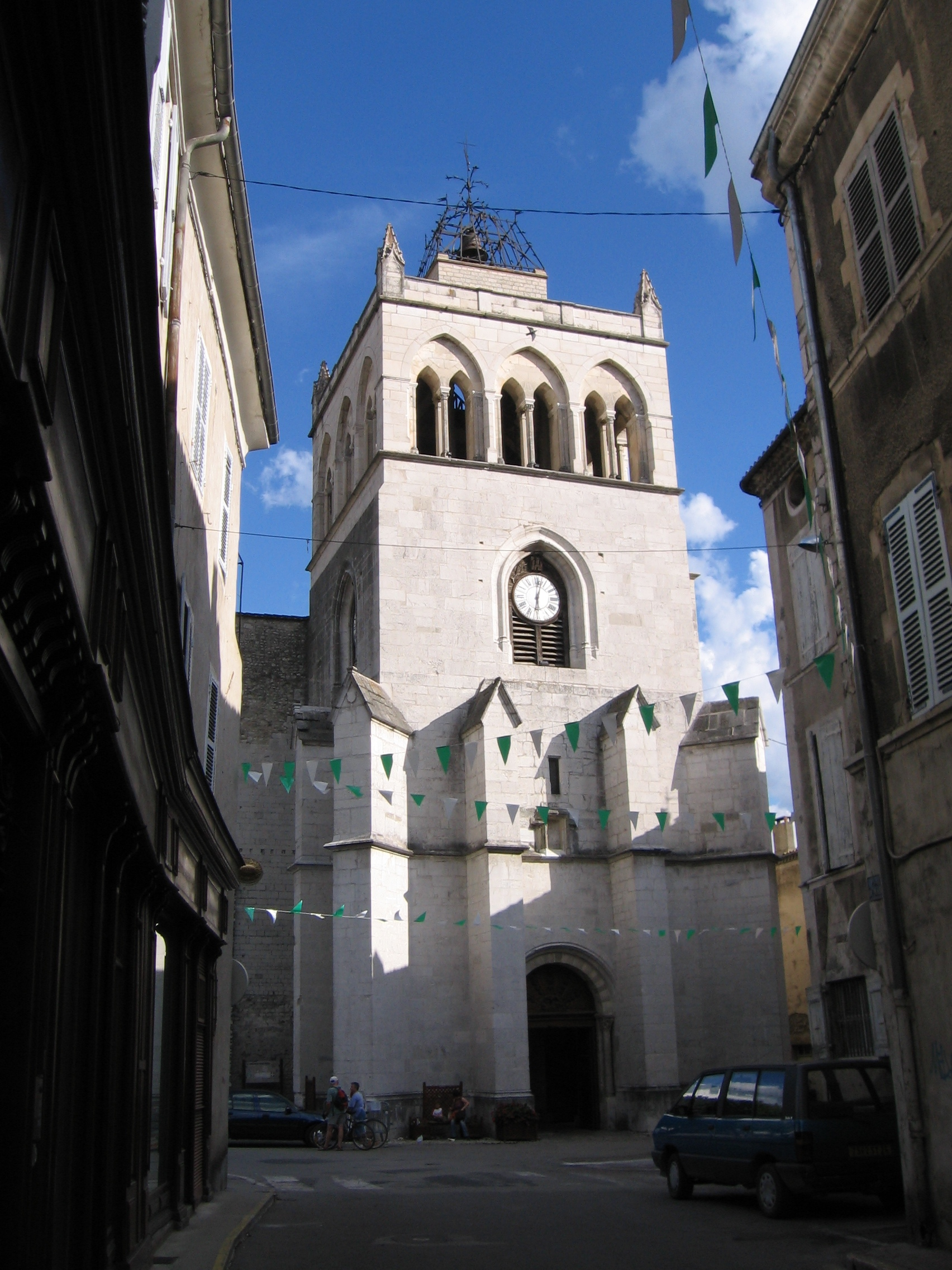
The town's Church

== Geography ==
Die is situated in the valley of the river Drôme, surrounded by the Glandasse mountain (6,696 feet; 2,041 m), a massive and steep rocky barrier, which separates the area (Pays Diois) from the Vercors Plateau. The territory of the commune of Die is part of the regional natural park.

== Transport ==
The central railway station of Die is Gare de Die, located just north-east of the town centre. The station offers connections to town of Valence (both Valence-Ville and Valence-TGV), Briançon, and other regional destinations.

== History ==
Habitation during the Neolithic age has been confirmed by the Chanqueyras excavations. A large engraved standing stone and two small menhirs that are now in the Die museum were found near the wine cooperative further proving habitation in this area at that time.

Late Bronze Age remains were discovered at La Roche De Marginal along with some similarly dated shards at Chandillon. A first settlement seems to have appeared at the beginning of the Roman era, on a small mountain pass alongside the Drôme, and the small valley of Meyrosse, at the crossroad between the valley itself the track to Trièves. There is much evidence of the extensive urbanisation during the 1st century.

The museum and some of the artifacts from Die and its surroundings

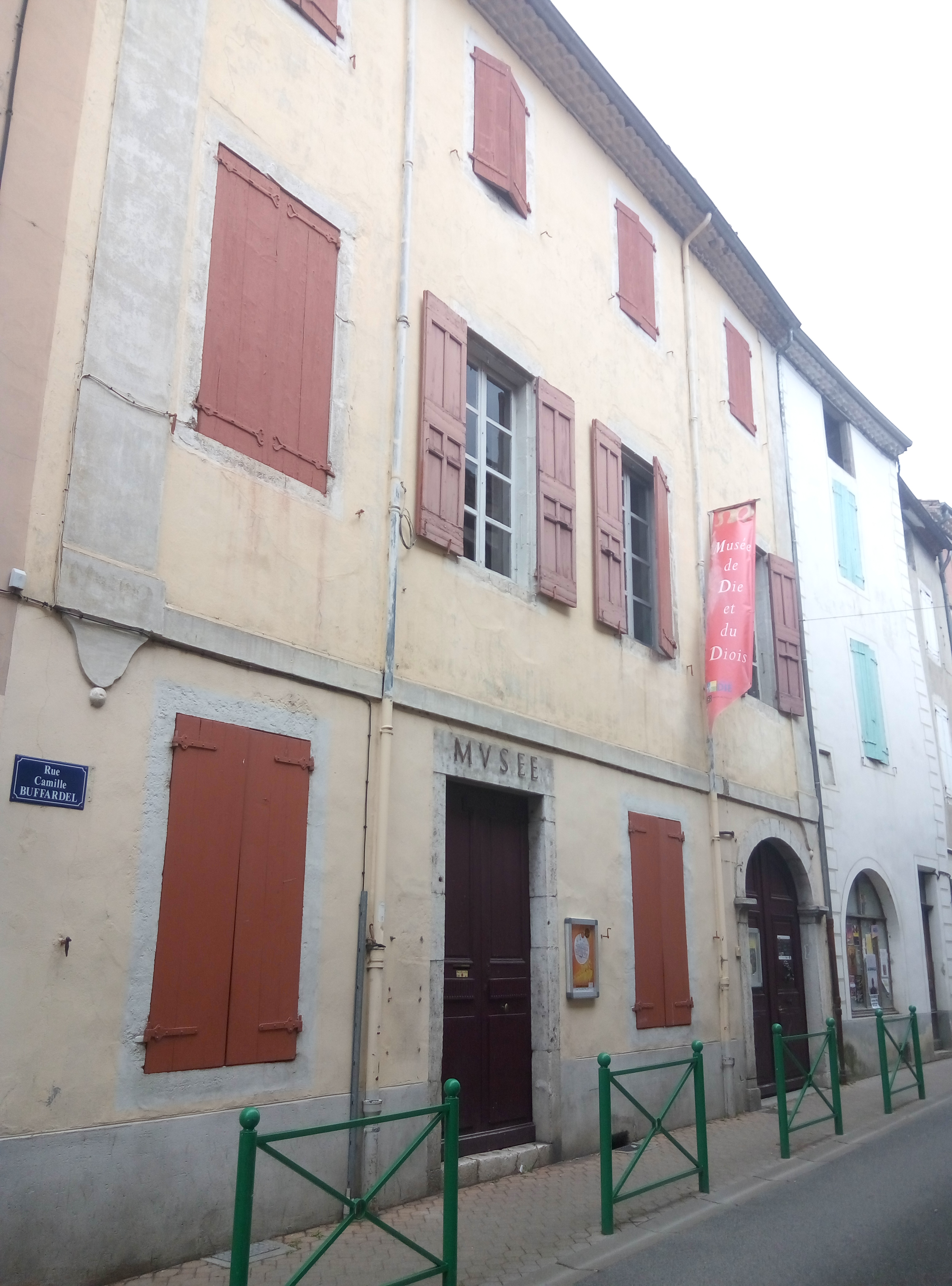

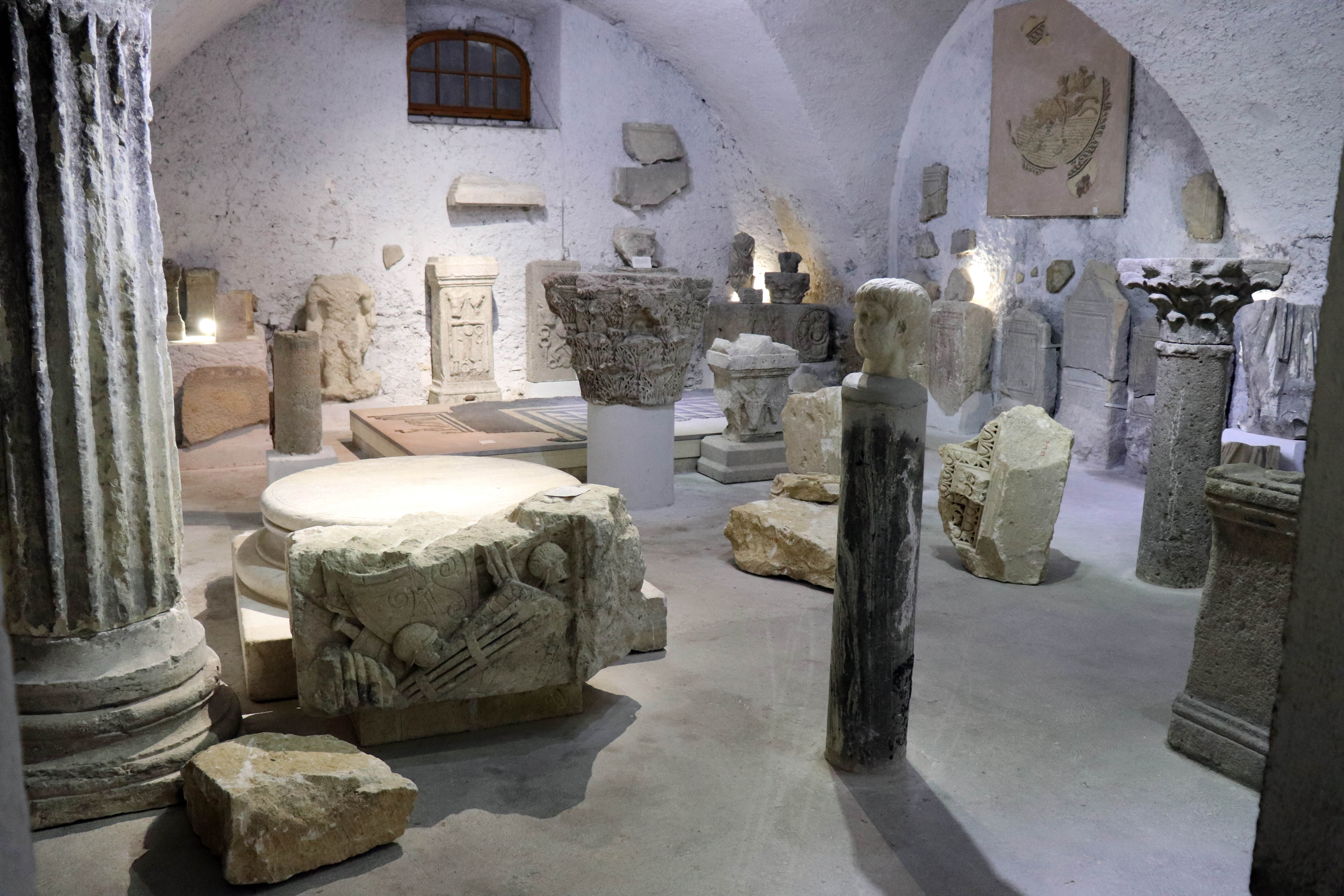

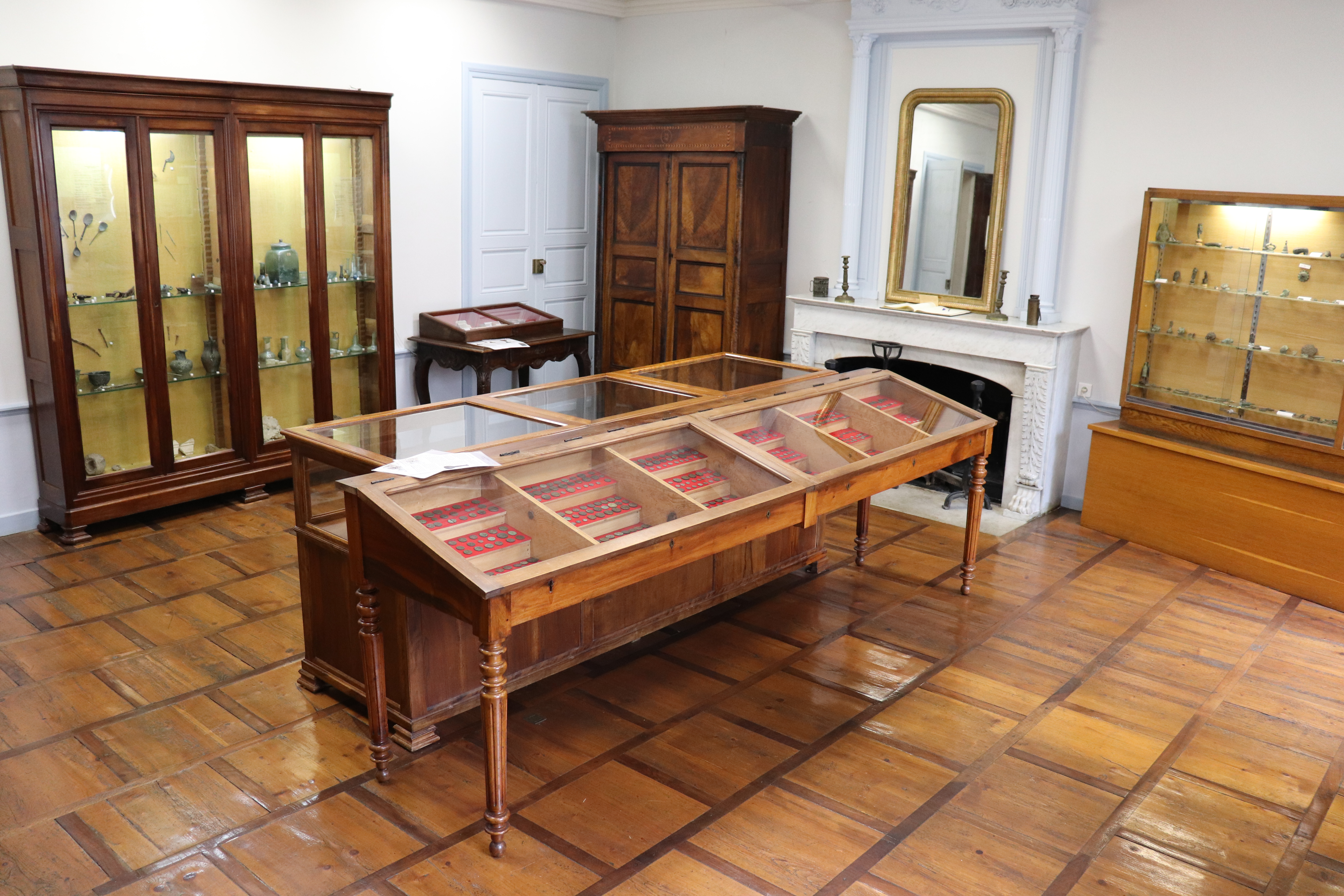

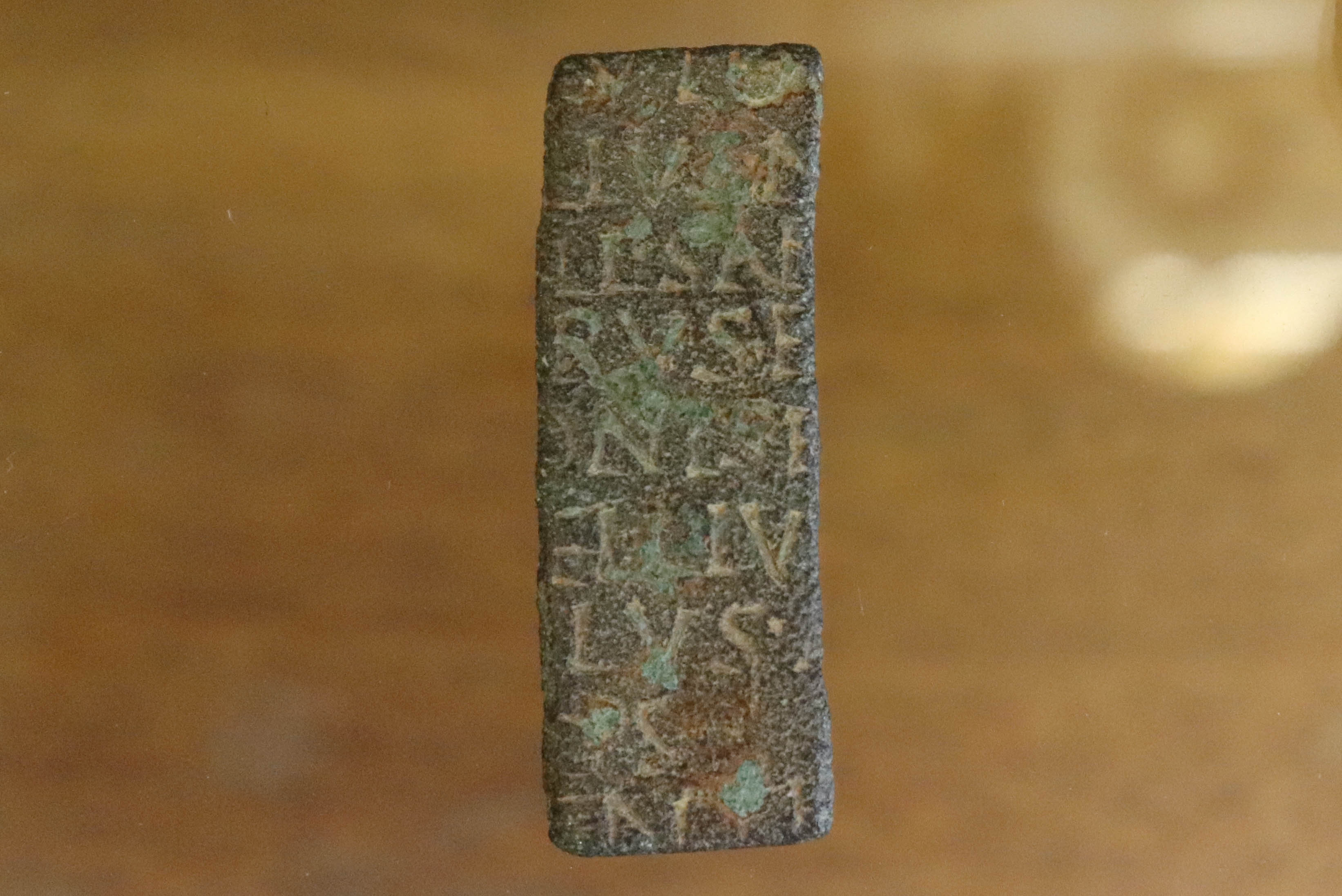

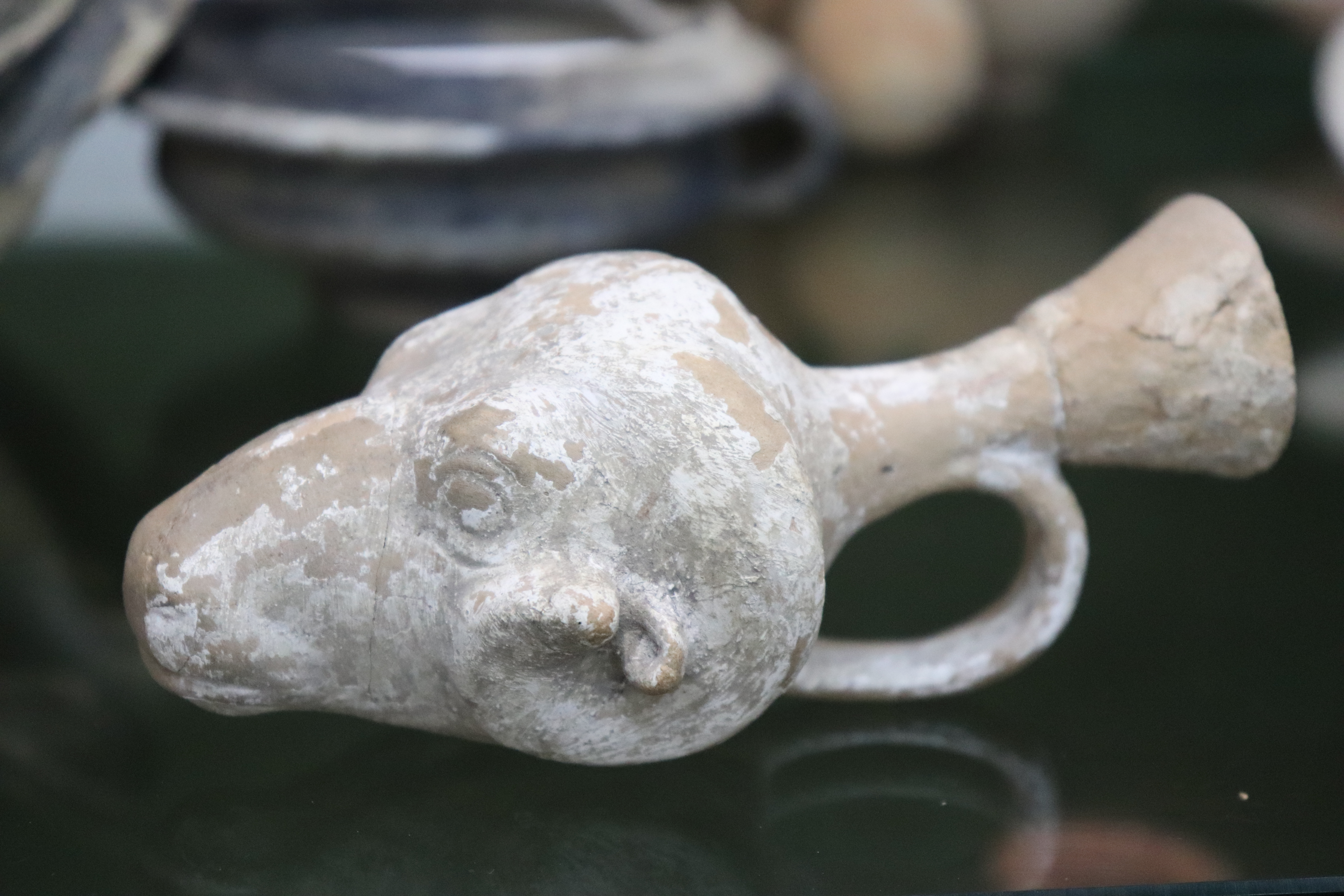

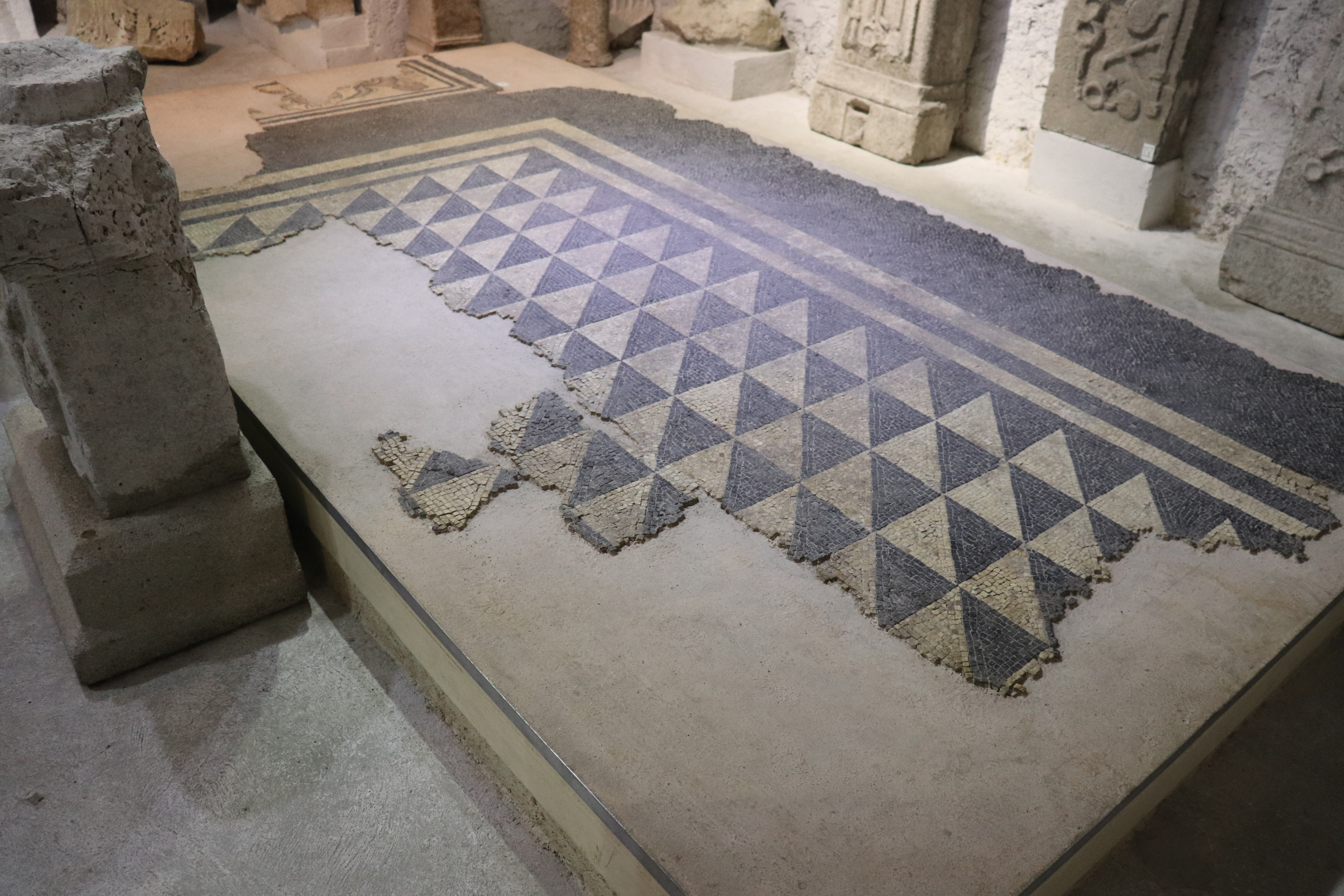

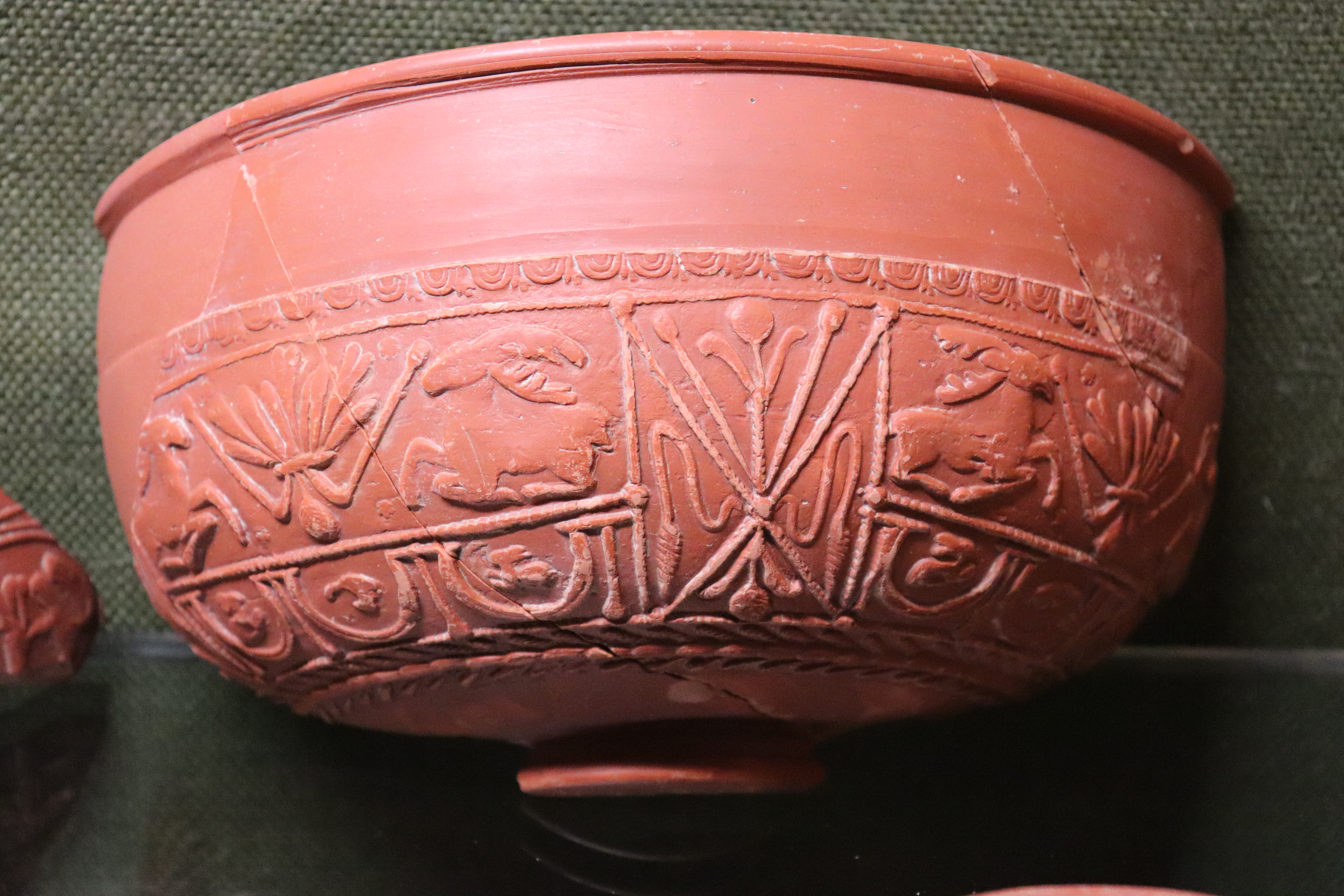

At the beginning of the 2nd century, the town of Die saw the construction of monumental architecture and also replaced Luc-en-Diois as the Roman provincial capital for the Celtic people of northern Voconces. It achieved the formal status of a colony towards the end of the 2nd century or during the 3rd century as shown by the town becoming an important centre of worship for the fertility goddess Cybele’s what?

When the Roman Empire was showing signs of weakness, between the 285 and 305, a fortified wall was constructed around the town, protecting an urban area of 25 hectares (62 acres), this wall is just over a mile long. Fragments of funerary monuments where included in its construction. Die had two main gates: to the west, the gate of Saint-Pierre (demolished in 1891) and to the east, the gate of Saint-Marcel. To go to Chichilliane, people would take the road near Grenoble, and cross the Glandasse mountain (south of Vercors). Rock was extracted from quarries on this plateau and brought to Die for use.

The first recorded bishop of the Ancient Diocese of Die was Nicaise in 325, the only Gallic church representative to attend the First Council of Nicaea. The diocese was later merged with the Roman Catholic Diocese of Valence in 1276, separated at the end of the 17th century and finally suppressed during the French Revolution.

=== Remains ===
The Die and Diois museum (Musée de Die) in the centre of town not only exhibits the multiple and imposing remains of the Roman era but also tells the story of the Diois during prehistory, its time as an episcopal city in the Middle-Ages and the devastation caused by religious wars.

== Population ==
Historical population

| Year | Pop. | ±% p.a. |
|---|---|---|
| 1793 | 3,251 | — |
| 1800 | 3,978 | +2.93% |
| 1806 | 3,421 | −2.48% |
| 1821 | 3,509 | +0.17% |
| 1831 | 3,555 | +0.13% |
| 1836 | 3,900 | +1.87% |
| 1841 | 3,924 | +0.12% |
| 1846 | 3,865 | −0.30% |
| 1851 | 3,928 | +0.32% |
| 1856 | 3,912 | −0.08% |
| 1861 | 3,874 | −0.20% |
| 1866 | 3,762 | −0.59% |
| 1872 | 3,876 | +0.50% |
| 1876 | 3,841 | −0.23% |
| 1881 | 3,703 | −0.73% |
| 1886 | 3,823 | +0.64% |
| 1891 | 3,729 | −0.50% |
| 1896 | 3,681 | −0.26% |
| 1901 | 3,638 | −0.23% |

| Year | Pop. | ±% p.a. |
|---|---|---|
| 1906 | 3,651 | +0.07% |
| 1911 | 3,797 | +0.79% |
| 1921 | 3,232 | −1.60% |
| 1926 | 3,304 | +0.44% |
| 1931 | 3,241 | −0.38% |
| 1936 | 3,175 | −0.41% |
| 1946 | 3,184 | +0.03% |
| 1954 | 3,326 | +0.55% |
| 1962 | 3,546 | +0.80% |
| 1968 | 4,048 | +2.23% |
| 1975 | 4,062 | +0.05% |
| 1982 | 3,992 | −0.25% |
| 1990 | 4,230 | +0.73% |
| 1999 | 4,451 | +0.57% |
| 2007 | 4,375 | −0.22% |
| 2012 | 4,392 | +0.08% |
| 2017 | 4,621 | +1.02% |
| 2023 | 4,844 | +0.79% |

Source: EHESS and INSEE (1968-2023)

== Economy ==
Apart from agriculturalists and wine producers, the economy is still composed of many SMEs including craftspeople tourism providers and local retailers. Die is also the economic and social centre of all the Diois with schools and professional and other training centres. Public and administrative services also care for the well-being of the town and the surrounding valley.

=== Tourism ===
The commune of Die has fewer than 5000 inhabitants. During the 1960s and 1970s, the city concentrated on small industries, such as furniture and shoes missed the opportunity to develop tourism.

By contrast, Die now receives a significant number of tourists during summer, from countries such as The Netherlands and Belgium who use the many camp sites around the Drôme valley. In winter, tourists come from the surrounding regions for winter sports at the Col du Rousset ski station (located in the Vercors Mountains). The most popular activities are: skiing (France's Handisport Ski Championship), snowshoe hiking, sled dog racing (International competition of Alpirush). In 1992 it hosted the International Mountain Race Competition which was won by a Colombian.

=== Agriculture ===
The cooperative winery Clairette de Die is the biggest Diois employer, had the idea a few years ago to adopt the brand name “jaillance” to increase competitiveness and brand recognition thus promoting its sales and exports.

== Twin towns – sister cities ==
Die is twinned with:

- Wirksworth, Derbyshire, United Kingdom
- Varallo Sesia, Piedmont, Italy
- Frankenau, Germany
- Kiskunfélegyháza, Bács-Kiskun, Hungary
- Dhouge, Senegal

== Climate ==
Climate data for Die, Drôme, elevation 384 m (1,260 ft), (1991–2020 normals, extremes 1990–present)
| Month | Jan | Feb | Mar | Apr | May | Jun | Jul | Aug | Sep | Oct | Nov | Dec | Year |
|---|---|---|---|---|---|---|---|---|---|---|---|---|---|
| Record high °C (°F) | 21.4 (70.5) | 23.1 (73.6) | 26.4 (79.5) | 29.6 (85.3) | 35.2 (95.4) | 40.6 (105.1) | 39.4 (102.9) | 40.9 (105.6) | 34.0 (93.2) | 31.9 (89.4) | 23.1 (73.6) | 19.3 (66.7) | 40.9 (105.6) |
| Mean daily maximum °C (°F) | 8.4 (47.1) | 10.3 (50.5) | 14.6 (58.3) | 17.8 (64.0) | 21.9 (71.4) | 26.3 (79.3) | 29.4 (84.9) | 29.1 (84.4) | 23.9 (75.0) | 18.9 (66.0) | 12.6 (54.7) | 8.5 (47.3) | 18.5 (65.3) |
| Daily mean °C (°F) | 3.4 (38.1) | 4.3 (39.7) | 7.8 (46.0) | 10.8 (51.4) | 14.8 (58.6) | 18.8 (65.8) | 21.3 (70.3) | 21.0 (69.8) | 16.7 (62.1) | 12.8 (55.0) | 7.4 (45.3) | 3.7 (38.7) | 11.9 (53.4) |
| Mean daily minimum °C (°F) | −1.7 (28.9) | −1.8 (28.8) | 0.9 (33.6) | 3.8 (38.8) | 7.8 (46.0) | 11.2 (52.2) | 13.1 (55.6) | 12.9 (55.2) | 9.6 (49.3) | 6.6 (43.9) | 2.2 (36.0) | −1.0 (30.2) | 5.3 (41.5) |
| Record low °C (°F) | −16.1 (3.0) | −17.3 (0.9) | −13.3 (8.1) | −7.2 (19.0) | −2.8 (27.0) | 2.0 (35.6) | 4.3 (39.7) | 2.2 (36.0) | −0.3 (31.5) | −5.1 (22.8) | −11.3 (11.7) | −18.0 (−0.4) | −18.0 (−0.4) |
| Average precipitation mm (inches) | 70.6 (2.78) | 51.4 (2.02) | 62.1 (2.44) | 82.4 (3.24) | 86.7 (3.41) | 69.4 (2.73) | 61.8 (2.43) | 66.9 (2.63) | 97.5 (3.84) | 98.1 (3.86) | 114.2 (4.50) | 78.0 (3.07) | 939.1 (36.97) |
| Average precipitation days (≥ 1.0 mm) | 8.7 | 7.2 | 8.1 | 9.5 | 10.1 | 7.5 | 5.7 | 6.0 | 7.0 | 9.1 | 9.8 | 9.9 | 98.5 |
Source: Meteociel

== See also ==
- Communes of the Drôme department
- Parc naturel régional du Vercors
