= Die station =

Railway station in Die, France

Die
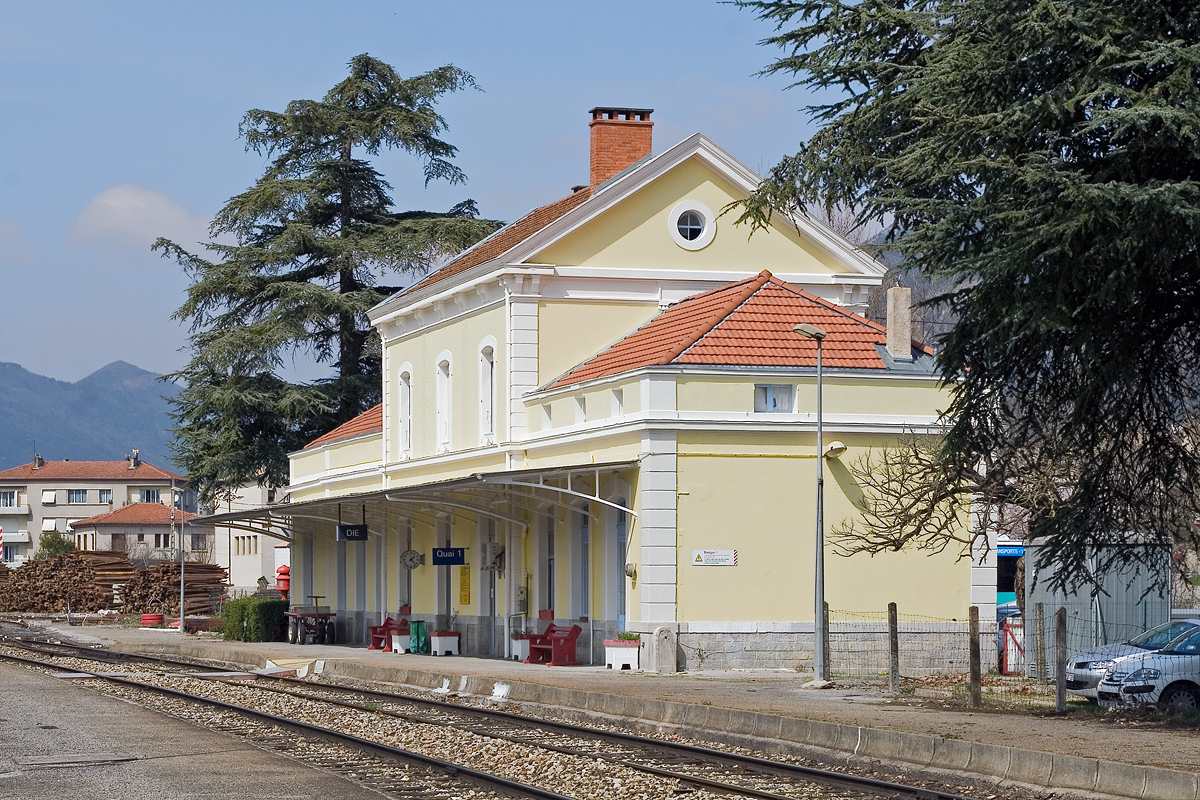
- Die railway station

General information
- Location: Place Pierre-Semard 26150 Die; Auvergne-Rhône-Alpes; France
- Coordinates: 44°45′31″N 5°21′44″E
- Owner: SNCF
- Operator: SNCF
- Line: Livron to Aspres-sur-Buëch
- Platforms: 2
- Tracks: 2

History
- Opened: 01 September 1885

Services
Preceding station	TER Auvergne-Rhône-Alpes	Following station
Salients towards Romans-Bourg-de-Péage	64	Luc-en-Diois towards Briançon
Preceding station	SNCF	Following station
Crest towards Paris-Austerlitz	Intercités (night)	Luc-en-Diois towards Briançon
Location

Die station (French: Gare de Die) is railway station in Die, Drôme, south-eastern France. Located on the Livron to Aspres-sur-Buëch line, it was opened in 1885.

== History ==
Die station was opened 01 September 1885 as a terminus by the Paris to Lyon and the Mediterranean Railway Company (French: Compagnie des chemins de fer de Paris à Lyon et à la Méditerranée (PLM)) when it extended the line from Crest. The line was further extended to Aspres-sur-Buëch on 1 April 1894.

== Train services ==
Both local and intercity services call at Die with overnight intercity services between Paris and Briançon operating in winter only. Local services are operated using Class X 72500 DMUs; intercity services use Class BB 75000 diesel locomotives.

As of 2023, the following train services call at Die:

- Local services (TER Auvergne-Rhône-Alpes) Romans-Bourg-de-Péage–Valence-Ville–Valence-TGV–Crest–Die–Briançon.
- Night services (Intercités de Nuit) Paris–Crest–Die–Gap–Briançon (winter only).

== See also ==
- List of SNCF stations in Auvergne-Rhône-Alpes
