= Ancient Diocese of Die =

Roman Catholic diocese in France (3rd c. - 1275, 1687 - 1801)

Coordinates: 44.75°N 5.37°E

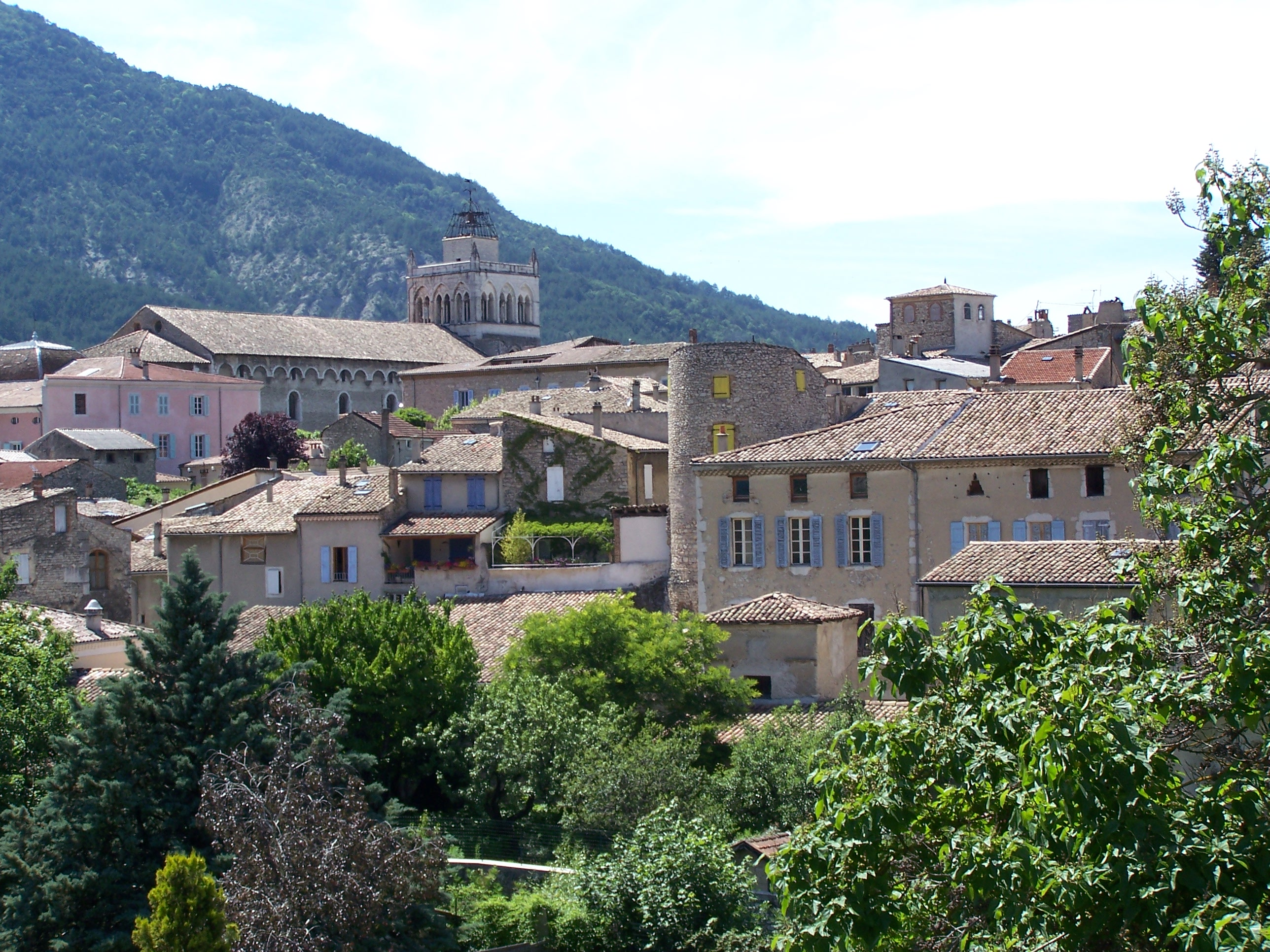
Cathedral of Die, with square tower

The former French Catholic diocese of Die existed from the fourth to the thirteenth century, and then again from 1678 to the French Revolution. It was suppressed by the Concordat of 1801, its territory being assigned to the diocese of Grenoble. The seat of the bishop was located in the Cathedral of the Assumption in Die.

== History ==
Situated on the River Drôme, Die was one of the nineteen principal towns of the tribe of the Vocontii. It was made a Roman colony by the Emperor Augustus in the 20s B.C.

No episcopal list exists for the diocese of Die. There is no myth, legend, or tradition with regard to the bringing of Christianity to the area or the foundation of the diocese. Die first appears in the record when Bishop Nicasius attended the Council of Nicaea in 325.

The Cathedral of Die was dedicated to the Assumption of the Virgin Mary. The Cathedral Chapter had two dignities, the Dean and the Sacristan, and ten other Canons. In the thirteenth century the diocese was divided for administrative purposes into four Archpresbyteries: the Archpriest of Die, the Archpriest of Trivilis (Trièves), the Archpriest of Deserto, the Archpriest of Crista. There was a Collegiate Church at Crest (Crista) dedicated to Saint-Sauveur, which had a Provost, a Cantor, and six Canons.

After the eleventh century the Diocese of Die, long disputed between the metropolitans of Vienne and Arles, became suffragan of the archbishopric of Vienne. On 28 March 1165 Pope Alexander III confirmed by papal bull the grant to the Church of Die on the part of Arnaud de Crest and Guillaume of Poitiers of the abbeys of S. Marcel de Die, Saint-Medard, Saint-Croix, Saint Julien-de-Guiniaise, Leoncel, and Saou. The bull also confirms the possession of the entire city of Die and nine castle-towns including Crista.

=== Union of diocese of Die and diocese of Valence ===
By Papal Bull of 25 September 1275, in order to strengthen the Church of Valence in its struggle with the House of Poitiers, Gregory X united the Diocese of Die with that of Valence. Five days later, on 30 September, Pope Gregory wrote to Abbot Amadeus of Roussillon, informing him that he had been named Bishop of Valence in succession to Bishop Guy, who had died in 1272. It was no accident that Amadeus of Roussillon was the nephew of Amadeus of Geneva, Bishop of Die. Amadeus of Roussillon was present at the bedside of his uncle when he made his Testament on 21 January 1276. Bishop Amadeus of Die died on 22 October 1276, and his nephew Amadeus of Roussillon became Bishop of Valence and Die.

=== Diocese of Die revived ===
This union, which lasted four centuries, was unfortunate for the Church in Die. The Huguenot sect, derived from the Calvinism of Geneva, had taken firm hold in the Dauphiné, and in particular in the Alpine valleys. In order to combat Protestantism, therefore, King Louis XIV, published the Edict of Fontainebleau on 22 October 1685, revoking the special rights granted to Protestants in France in the Edict of Nantes. King Louis revived the diocese of Die and appointed a Bishop of Die in 1687. From the point of view of the Roman Catholic Church, however, the union of the two dioceses was dissolved canonically in the Consistory of 7 July 1692 by Pope Innocent XII. On 10 September 1692, the Bishop of Die, Armand de Montmorin Saint-Hérem, had an interview with James II of England and Louis XIV. Asked for a report on the state of the Dauphiné, inter alia the Bishop reported that Die was entirely in the hands of the Huguenots.

=== French Revolution ===
In 1790 the Civil Constitution of the Clergy reduced the number of dioceses in France from 135 to 83, and ordered that they be coterminous with the new départements of the civil organization. Each département was authorized and ordered to elect its own bishop; the electors did not have to be Catholic, and that fact alone created a schism between the Constitutional Church and Constitutional Bishops and the Roman Catholic Church. Bishop Gaspard-Alexis Plan des Augiers protested, and then fled his diocese; he died in exile in Rome in 1794. On 21 February 1791, the Constitutional diocese of Drôme elected François Marbos, curé of the parish of Bourg-lez-Valence as their 'bishop'. He was consecrated in Paris on 3 April 1791, by Jean Baptiste Gobel of Paris, assisted by Bishops Mirodot and Gouttes. After the Concordat of 1801 he retracted his errors, and died in communion with Rome in 1825.

== Bishops ==
The Carthusian who went by the pseudonym Polycarpe de la Rivière gives a St. Martinus (220) as first Bishop of Die; his assertion has been doubted. The oldest historically known bishop is Nicasius of Dijon, who attended the First Council of Nicaea in 325.

=== to 1276 ===
- Nicasius: 325
- Audentius: c. 439
- Petronius
- Marcellus : 463
- Saeculatius : 517, 518
- Lucretius : 541, 573
- Paul : 585
- Maximus : 614
- Desideratus : 788
- Remigius : 859
- Aurelius : 875
- Hemico 879
- Achideus : 957
- Wulfinus (Wulfade) : 974
- Conon (Cuno) : 1037
- Pierre I : 1055
- Lancelin 1073
- Hugues de Romans 1082
- Ponce : 1084–1086
- Bernard
- Ismido (Ismidon de Sassenage) : 1097/8?–1115
- Pierre II : 1116–1119
- Étienne : 1121–1127
- Ulric (Odolric) : 1130
- Hugues, : died in 1159
- Pierre III : 1163–1173
- Bernard : 1176
- Humbert : 1199–1212
- Étienne de Chatillon : died 1213
- Desiderius de Forcalquier (Didier de Lans) 1213–1222
- Bertrand D'Étoile 1223–1235
- Humbert II 1235–1245, resigned
- Amedée de Genève 1245–1276

United with the diocese of Valence (1276–1687)

=== from 1687 to 1801 ===
- [Daniel de Cosnac : 1687–1691]
- Armand de Montmorin Saint-Hérem : 1691–1694
- Séraphin de Pajot de Plouy : 1694–1701
- Gabriel de Cosnac : 1701–1734
- Daniel-Joseph de Cosnac : 1734–1741
- Gaspard-Alexis Plan des Augiers 1741–1794, last bishop of Valence and Die

== See also ==
- Catholic Church in France
- List of Catholic dioceses in France

== Books ==
- Brun-Durand, J. (1875). Notes pour l'histoire du diocèse de Die à propos du Gallia Christiana: continuation de H. Hauréau (in French). Valence: Chenevier et Chavet. [Lists of Bishops, Provosts, Deans, and Sacristans of the Cathedral of Die]
- Chevalier, C.U.J (1868), Documents inédits relatifs au Dauphiné. Grenoble: Prudhomme.
- Chevalier, Jules (1879). Saint Pétrone et Saint Marcel Evêque de Die au Ve siècle: recherches historiques et documents liturgiques (in French). Montélimar: Bourron.
- Chevalier, Jules (1888). Essai historique sur l'église et la ville de Die: depuis les origines jusqu'à l'année 1276 (in French). Vol. Tome Ier. Montélimar: impr. Bourron.
- Chevalier, Jules (1896). Essai historique sur l'église et la ville de Die: Depuis l'année 1277 jusqu'en l'année 1508 (in French). Vol. Tome IIe. Montelimar: J. Céas.
- Chevalier, Jules (1903). La Révolution a Die et dans la vallée de la Drôme (1789-1799) (in French). Valence: J. Céas.
- Columbi, Jean (1652). De rebus gestis Valentinorum et Diensium episcoporum (in Latin) (second ed.). Lyon: Canier. p. 220.
- Duchesne, Louis (1907). Fastes épiscopaux de l'ancienne Gaule: I. Provinces du Sud-Est (in French). Paris: Fontemoing. second edition
- Eubel, Conradus, ed. (1913). Hierarchia catholica (in Latin). Vol. 1 (Tomus 1) (second ed.). Münster: Libreria Regensbergiana.
- Gams, Pius Bonifatius (1873). Series episcoporum Ecclesiae catholicae: quotquot innotuerunt a beato Petro apostolo. Ratisbon: Typis et Sumptibus Georgii Josephi Manz. (Use with caution; obsolete)
- Gauchat, Patritius (Patrice) (1935). Hierarchia catholica IV (1592-1667). Münster: Libraria Regensbergiana.
- Jean, Armand (1891). Les évêques et les archevêques de France depuis 1682 jusqu'à 1801 (in French). Paris: A. Picard. pp. 480–481.
- Ritzler, Remigius; Sefrin, Pirminus (1952). Hierarchia catholica medii et recentis aevi V (1667-1730). Patavii: Messagero di S. Antonio.
- Ritzler, Remigius; Sefrin, Pirminus (1958). Hierarchia catholica medii et recentis aevi VI (1730-1799). Patavii: Messagero di S. Antonio.
- Sogno, Pierre (2007). Villages de la Drôme. Meylan: les points cardinaux. pp. 20–41. ISBN 978-2-906728-32-5.
