= Crest station =

Railway station in Crest, France

Crest
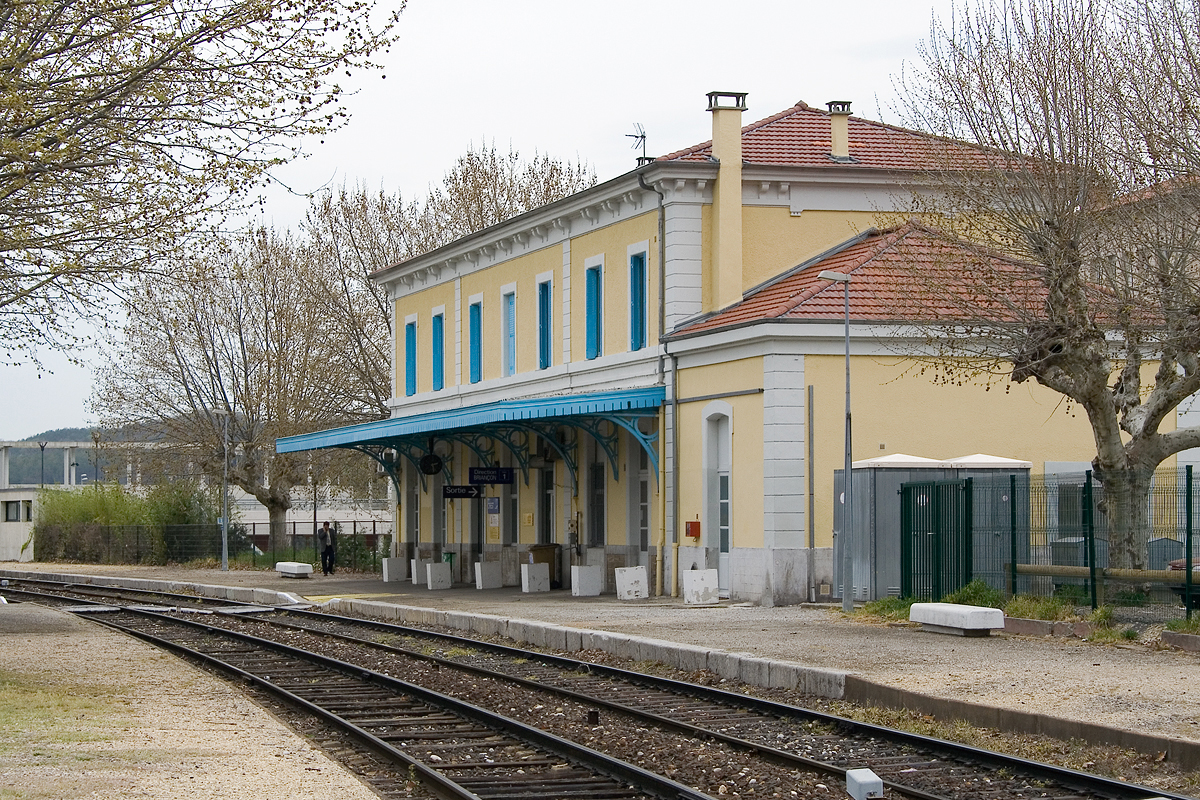
- Crest railway station

General information
- Location: Bd du Six Juin 1944, 26400 Crest; Auvergne-Rhône-Alpes; France
- Coordinates: 44°43′48″N 5°00′58″E
- Owner: SNCF
- Operator: SNCF
- Line: Livron to Aspres-sur-Buëch
- Platforms: 2
- Tracks: 2

History
- Opened: 25 September 1871

Services
Preceding station	TER Auvergne-Rhône-Alpes	Following station
Montoison towards Romans-Bourg-de-Péage	64	Aouste-sur-Sye towards Briançon
Preceding station	SNCF	Following station
Paris-Austerlitz Terminus	Intercités (night)	Die towards Briançon
Location

Crest station (French: Gare de Crest) is a railway station located in Crest, Drôme, south-eastern France. The station was opened in 1871 and is located on the Livron to Aspres-sur-Buëch line. Train services are operated by SNCF.

== History ==
Crest station was opened 25 September 1871 by the Paris to Lyon and the Mediterranean Railway Company (French: Compagnie des chemins de fer de Paris à Lyon et à la Méditerranée (PLM)) when it opened the Livron to Crest section of its line from Livron to Aspres-sur-Buëch. The line was extended to Die on 1 September 1885, and to Aspres-sur-Buëch on 1 April 1894.

== Train services ==
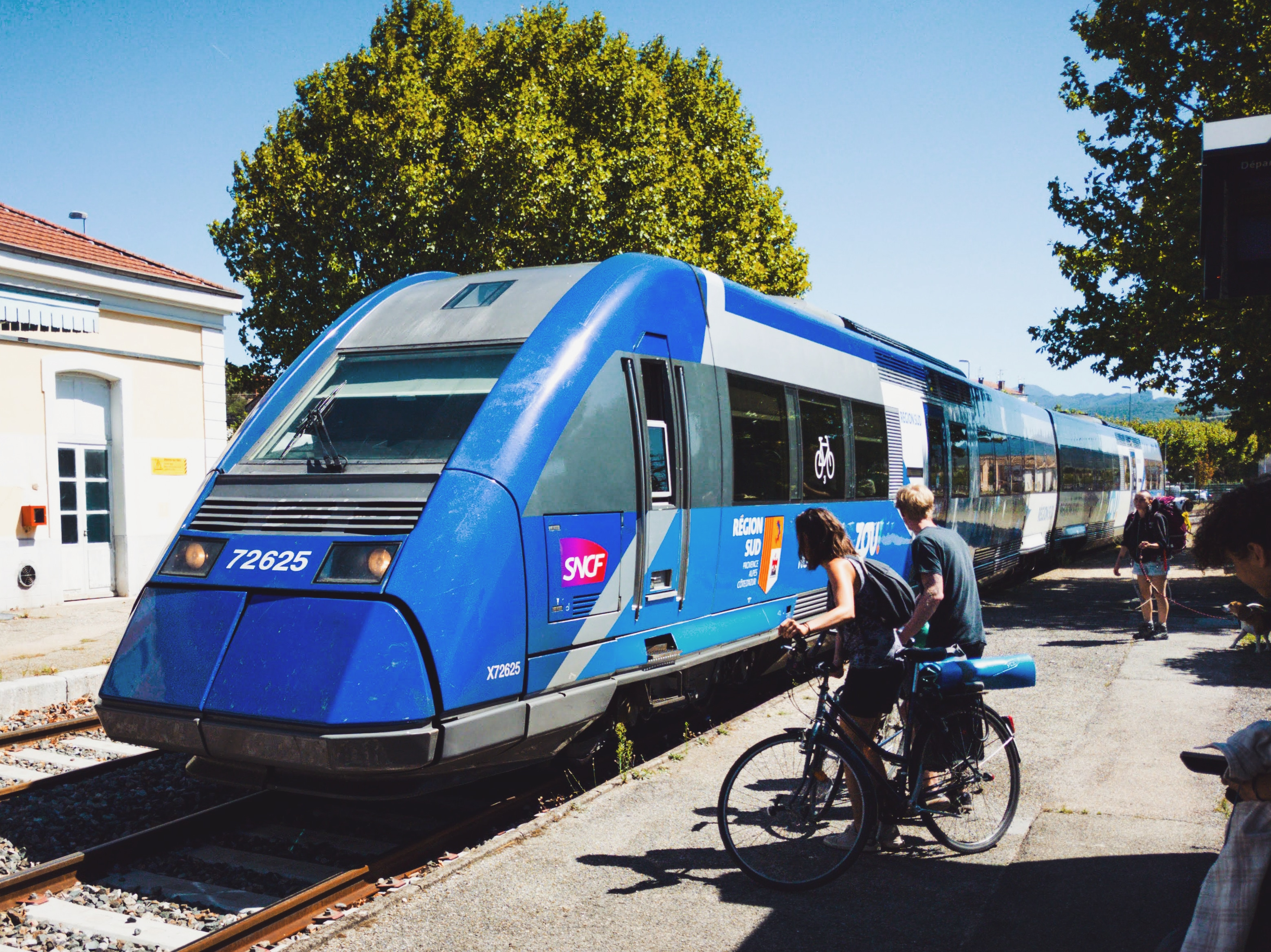
SNCF Class X 72500 DMU waiting at Crest Station in 2023.

Both local and intercity services call at Crest with overnight intercity services operating in winter only. Local services are operated using Class X 72500 DMUs; intercity services use Class BB 75000 diesel locomotives.

As of 2023, the following train services call at Crest:

- Local services (TER Auvergne-Rhône-Alpes) Romans-Bourg-de-Péage - Valence-Ville - Valence-TGV - Crest - Die - Briançon.
- Night services (Intercités de Nuit) Paris–Gap–Briançon (winter only).

== See also ==
- List of SNCF stations in Auvergne-Rhône-Alpes
