= Polycarpe de la Rivière =

17th-century Carthusian prior

Dom Polycarpe de la Rivière was Carthusian prior of the 17th century, historian and scholar with a fertile imagination. Much of his life is unknown, and, although he wrote biographies on numerous personalities, he is generally considered to have been a fabricator of persons, names, dates, and documents. The date, place, and circumstances of his death are unknown. He disappeared in September 1639.

== Life ==
Polycarpe de la Rivière, according to his own testimony, was born in the village of Velay in the Languedoc, not far from Le Puy. On the title pages of his books, he is called "Vélaunois." He was born around 1584.

At the age of 20, he was in the service of a "great princess", probably Marguerite de Valois, who resided at the Château d'Usson until 1605. After he left the service of the princess, he entered a Jesuit novitiate, though he did not remain for long. In his 21st year, in January 1608, he was received at the Grand Chartreuse by the Father General, Dom Bruno d'Affringues (1600–1631).

He was Prior of Sainte-Croix-en-Jarez from 1618 to 1627. During that time, he published three works, Adieu du Monde, Angelique, and Le Mistère sacré de nostre rédemption.

He was Prior of the Chartreuse of Bordeaux from 1627-1629. During this time, in 1627, he was co-visitor of the Carthusian province of Provence and the province of Aquitaine.

He was made prior of Bonpas in 1630. At the General Chapter of 1632, he was appointed to present a discourse. In 1633, he was visitor of the Carthusian province of Provence. In September 1633, Polycarpe was in Marseille, for the laying of the cornerstone of the new Chartreuse.

In 1638, Prior Polycarpe petitioned the General Chapter of the Carthusian Order, not for the first time, for release from some of his duties, so that he could devote his energies to his Annales Christianissimae Ecclesiae Gallicanae. Among other things, he was excused from choral attendance on ordinary days, and on festival days only required to attend at Lauds and Vespers. He was also granted leave at any time to move about the priory, and to travel to Avignon and other locations.

In 1639, he asked to be transferred to the Chartreuse of Moulins for the sake of his health. He resided there for ten months, when, again for health reasons, he requested permission from the prior of Moulins to visit the baths at Mount Dore. In September 1639, he departed Moulins with a servant of that Chartreuse and two mules. On 13 December 1639, the Prior General, Just Perrot, requested the Prior of Moulins to provide information as to the whereabouts of Dom Polycarpe. He is known to have reached Clermont, but then he disappeared. Several rumors were pursued, and found to be without foundation.

On 18 February and again on 28 February 1640, the Prior General wrote to the prior of the Chartreuse of Rome that Dom Polycarpe's manuscripts and papers had not been taken with him to Moulins; they had been deposited with a lawyer named Rabaud, in Arles.

== Biographical interests ==
Among the persons about whom he wrote are:

- Albinus of Vienne (d. 262)
- Castor d'Apt
- Eutropius of Orange
- Hugues de Payns
- Mellonius
- J. Colombi (1652), relying on Polycarpe, names the first bishop of Die as bishop St Martius c.220, then St Higerius, Leo, Servilius, and finally Nicasius. Only the last of these is attested.
- Bishop Laugier of Digne (ca. 1050?), known only from a missing or fabricated charter, seen only by Polycarpe.
- Polycarpe claims that Marcel de Die wrote a letter from the First Council of Nicaea for Nicasius to forward to the bishops of Gaul. No trace of this letter has ever been found.

== Works ==
Even in his own lifetime, his works were considered to be controversial, and remain so. Many of his later works were refused permission to publish, or remained incomplete.

- 1617: Recreations spirituelles sur l'Amour divin... (Paris: Chez Regnaud-Chaudiere 1617). 1619 and 1622. "Spiritual Recreations on divine love and the good of souls." With an anagram of Polycarp appears an element showing a phonetic cryptography system that Polycarp seems boldly master.
- Angelique des excellences et perfections immortelles de l'âme, "immortal excellencies and perfections of the soul." Only published in 1626: "Angelica" His superior accused Polycarpe of having written this book in French; he regrets that it was not written in Latin. This book contains interesting and innovative observations on natural history.
- 1619: L' Adieu du monde ("Farewell to the world, or the contempt of his vain and perishable magnitudes pleasures") (in French), second edition (Lyon, Pillehotte, 1621). The dedication is to Dom Bruno d'Affringues, Prior General of the Carthusian Order.
- 1621: Le Mistere sacré de nostre Redemption. "The Sacred Mystery of Our Redemption" (three volumes).
- 1618: Pensées sur le Cantique de Salomon. (in French). "The Eloquent Loving Thought, or, on the Song of Solomon." Written before he took his Carthusian vows on 1 March 1609.
- 1625: "The penitent soul from the Cross"
- 1638 "Annales Ecclesiae Urbis et Avenionensis comitatus. " Manuscript in two volumes. "History of the city of Avignon." This book was banned by Rome, despite all the interventions of canon Maselli. It is filled with errors and fabrications.
- 1640: "Historia Ordinis Cartusiensis". Publication was refused by the Prior General, Dom Bruno d'Affringues.

"Catalogus Priorum Majoris Cartusiae Gratinanopolitanae".

- 1636: "Historia Ecclesia Gallicanae, seu Natilia Episcopatuum Galliae". Only three volumes of the planned seventeen have been made available. All are in manuscript or notes, and have never been published.
- "Chronique inédite des Evêques de Valence et de Die", derives from the mss. of Peiresc, material supplied to him by Polycarpe de la Riviere]. Valence: Imprimerie de Jules Céas et fils, 1891.
- Polycarpe de la Rivière also left a number of prayers and sermons.
- Letters

== Sources ==
- Barjavel, Casimir François Henri (1841). Dictionnaire historique, biographique et bibliographique du département de Vaucluse. (in French). Volume 2. Carpentras: Imprimerie de L. Devillario, 1841. pp. 342-344.
- Bayle, Georges (1888). "Dom Polycarpe de la Rivière," (in French), in: Memoires de l'Académie de Vaucluse Vol. 7 (1888), pp. 299-320.
- Chevalier, Jules (1886). "Notes et documents pour servir à l'histoire des Évêques d'Avignon et de Valence dans la seconde moitié du XIII^{e} siècle," (in French), in: Bulletin de la Société départementale d'archéologie et de statistique de la Drôme, Volume 20 (Valence: Secrétariat de la société, 1886), pp. 165-179.
- Chevalier, Ulysse (1891). Description analytique du cartulaire du chapitre de Saint-Maurice de Vienne: Suivie d'un Appendice de chartes et Chronique inédite des Evêques de Valence et de Die. (in French and Latin). Valence: Imprimerie de Jules Céas et fils, 1891. [The "Chronique inédite des Evêques de Valence et de Die" derives from the mss. of Peiresc, material supplied to him by Polycarpe de la Riviere].
- Chevalier, Ulysse (1919). "Discourse sur la vie et les oeuvres du chanoine J.-M.-H. Albanès," (in French), in: Bulletin d'archéologie et de statistique de la Drôme, Volume 53 (Valence: Société d'archéologie et de statistique de la Drôme 1919), pp. 128-175, at pp. 163-164.
- Daronnat, Eric (1995). Dom Polycarpe de la Rivière, écrivain et poète chartreux. (in French). Trévoux: La Compagnie de Trévoux, 1995.
- Douzet, André (1994). Éléments du passé de Sainte-Croix-en-Jarez, Chartreuse, pour servir à son histoire. (in French). FeniXX.. Pp. 59-70.
- Duprat, Eugène (1908). "L'Inscription de Casarie et Polycarpe de la Rivière," in: Annales de la Société d'études provençales d'Aix (Aix-en-Provence 1908), pp. 329-340.
- Duprat, Eugène (1914). "Un faux évêque d'Avignon (Pierre, 1245)," (in French), in: Annales du Midi, Volume 26 (Toulouse: E. Privat, 1914), pp. 161-188. [extensive quotations from Polycarp's Annales]
- Vachez, Antoine. La chartreuse de Sainte-Croix-en-Jarez. Lyon: Louis Brun, 1904. Pp. 120-157.
