= Musée de Die =

Coordinates: 44.7550103°N 5.369820°E

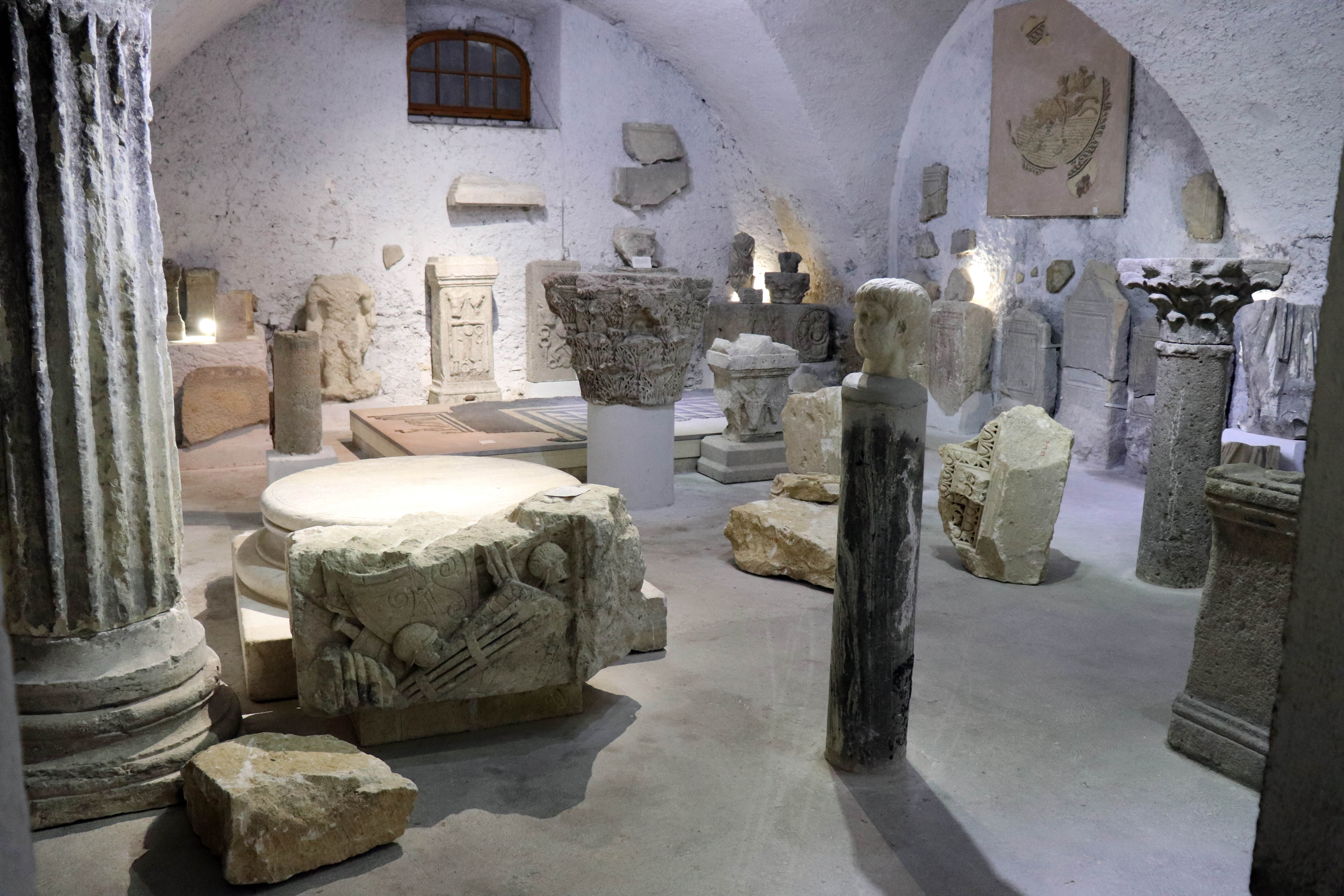
- Established: 1905
- Location: Die
- Type: Archaeological museum
- Website: http://www.museededie.org/

The Musée de Die et du Diois is an archaeological museum dedicated to the story of Die, France, the ancient Roman city Augusta Dea Vocontiorum.

== History ==
The museum was created in 1905 by the mayor of the time, Joseph Reynaud, to receive archaeological collections from Albert Gayet's excavations on the Coptic necropolis of Antinoöpolis, in Egypt. These collections had been exhibited in Paris, at the Petit Palais in Paris, and were distributed in regional museums, as well as in Die.

Soon, Roman and medieval remains of the ancient city of Die (Colonia Dea Augusta Vocontiorum) came to complete the collections of the nascent museum. A monetary treasure dating from the Wars of Religion soon made its entry (discovered in 1883, he was presented at the communal school). In 1924, Joseph Reynaud decided to bequeath his mansion to the city, located in the center, to install the collection. This was done in 1941, and the new museum was inaugurated in 1949, taking advantage of the sixth centenary of the annexation of the Dauphiné to the French crown (1349). A curator was named: Maurice Arnaud.

In 1967, the city made a major acquisition for its museum: an archeological collection patiently collected locally between 1820 and 1930 by Dr. Jean-Denis Long and his successors came to double the volume of objects presented to the museum, which grew under the management of its curator, Henri Desaye, known for his epigraphic skills. He traveled the region to study (and if possible, to collect for the museum) the archaeological remains of the past of the city of Die, Luc-en-Diois (the other Roman capital of Vocontii) ) and of this entire Alpine territory of the Drôme.

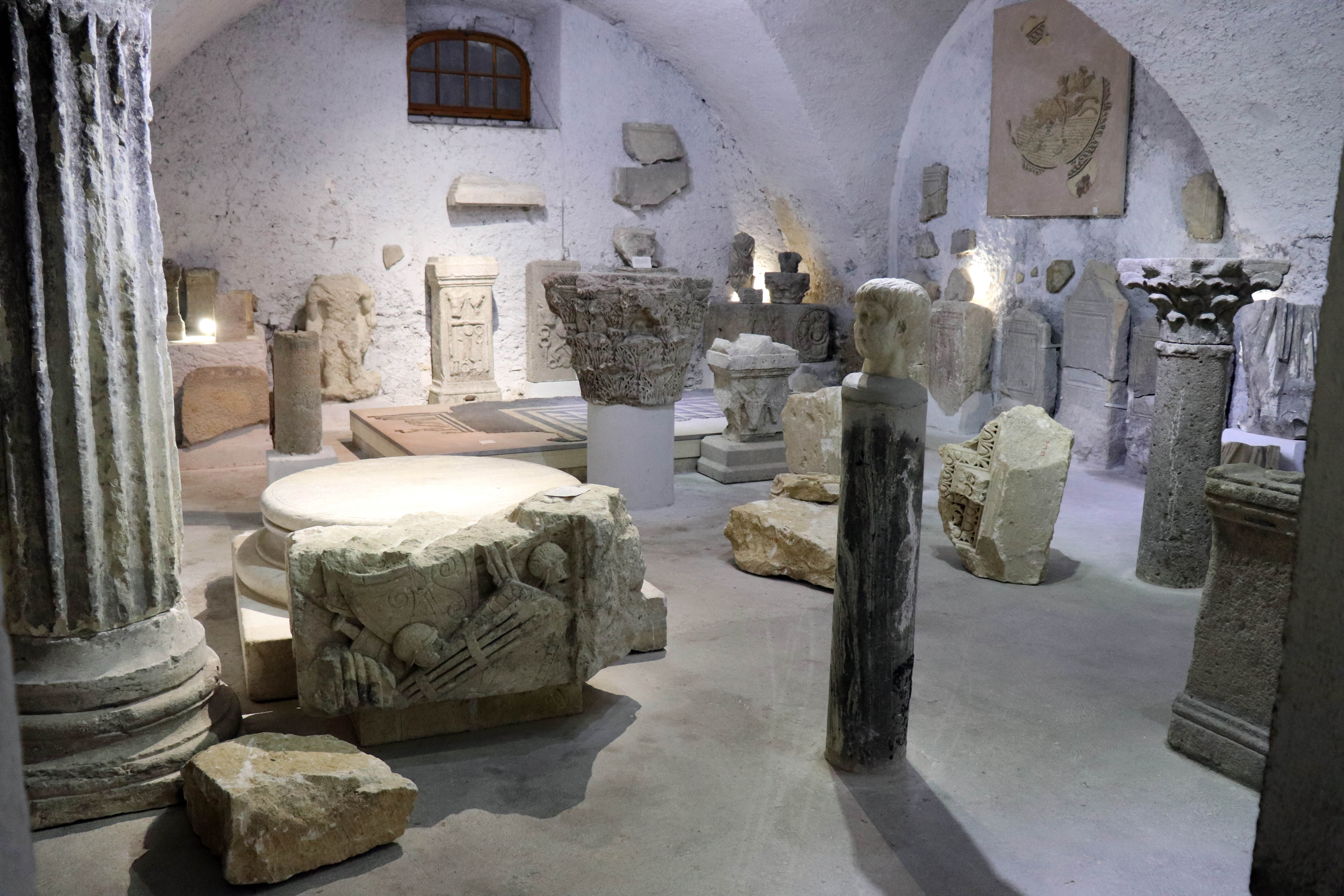

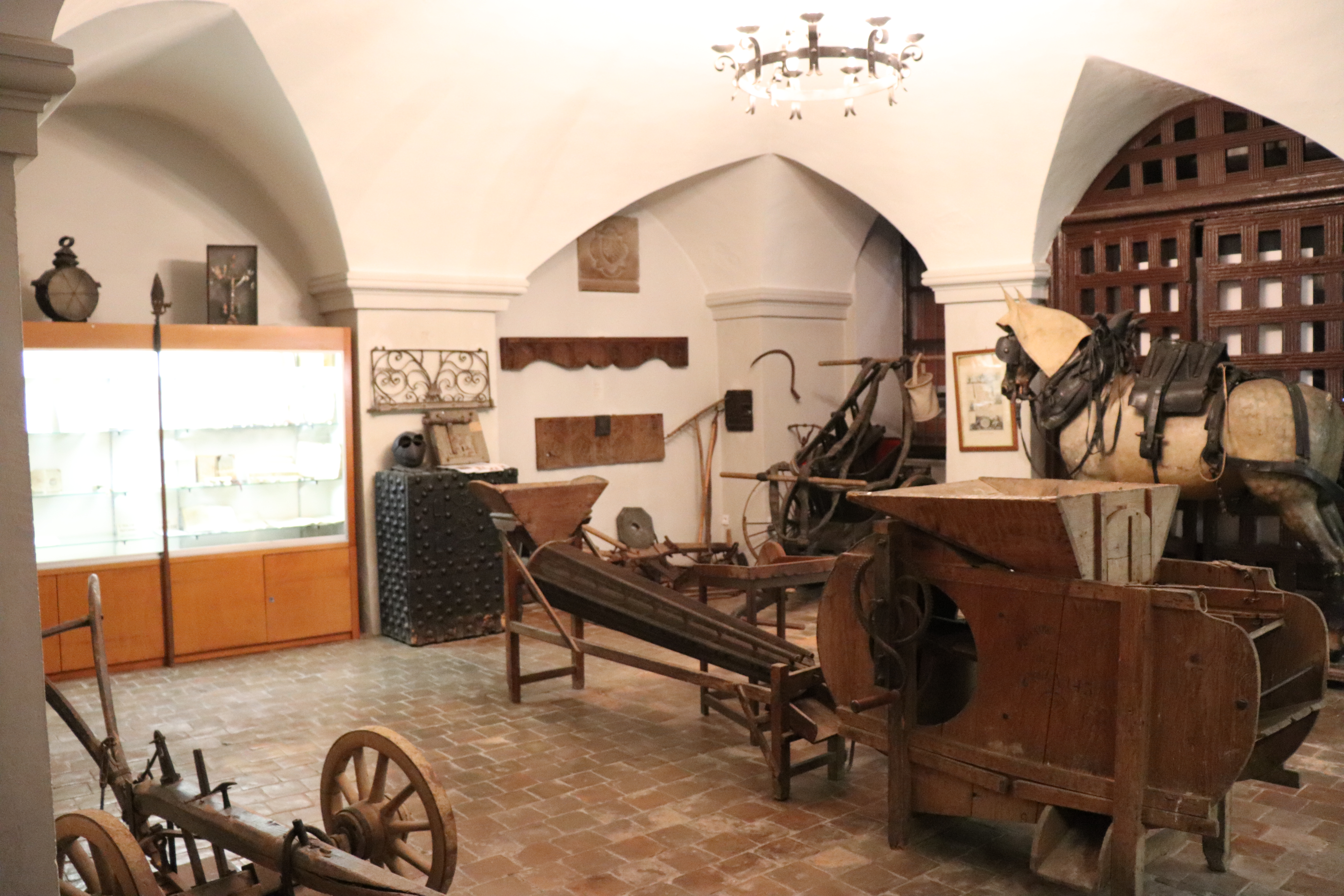

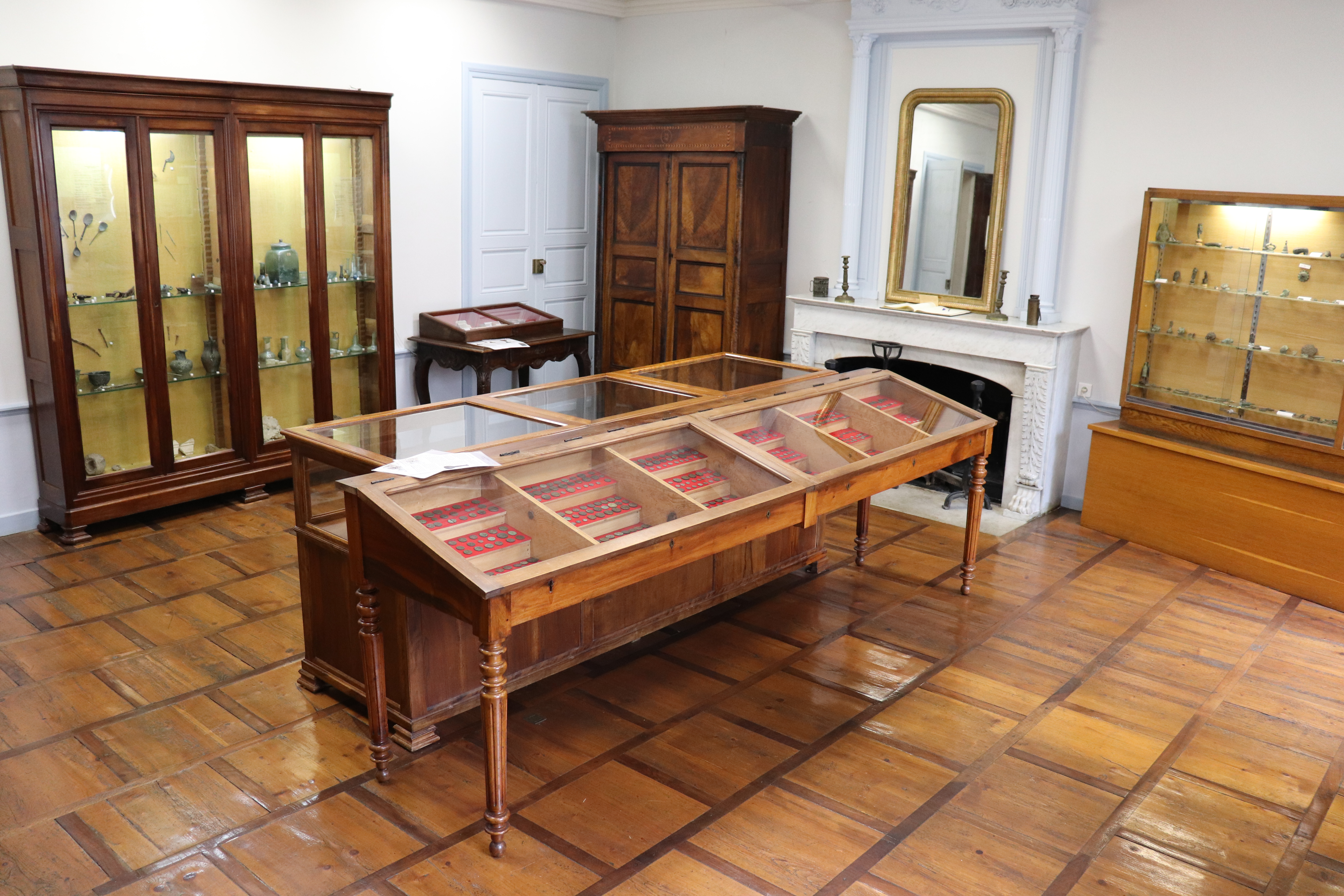

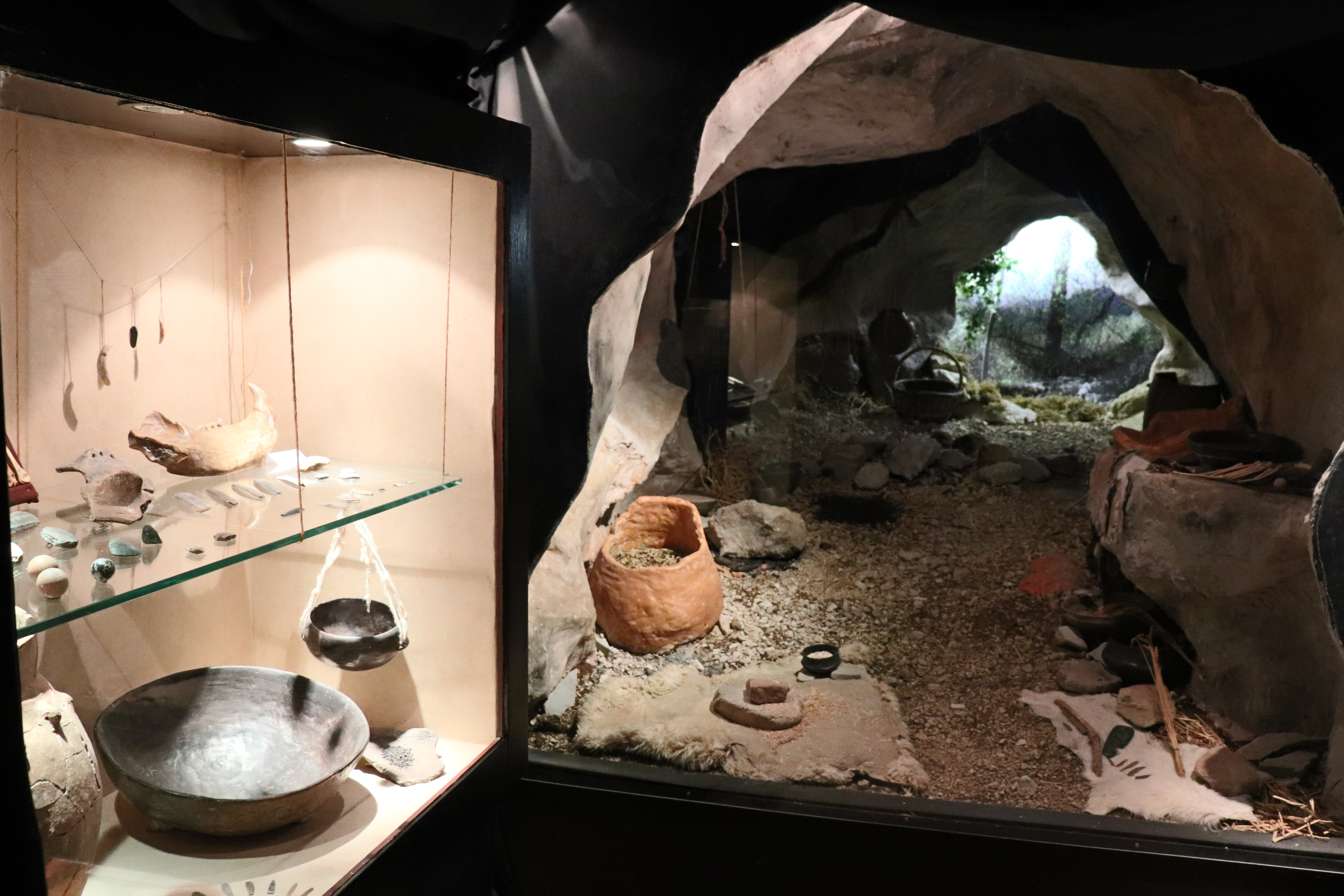

In 1992, a fortuitous discovery further increased the museum's presentations: a Neolithic menhir, exceptional because of its size (4 meters long) and because of the engravings it carries, putting it directly in touch with the great menhirs of Brittany or Île-de-France. With this menhir, prehistory made in 1996 a remarkable entrance to the museum.

The museum is planned to be moved to the old episcopal palace of the city (where the mosaic of the four rivers can be seen), which would considerably enlarge its area and add many objects to the current collections.
