= Die Cathedral =

Roman Catholic church in Die, Drôme, France

Coordinates: 44°45′8″N 5°22′16″E

Die Cathedral Cathédrale Notre-Dame de Die
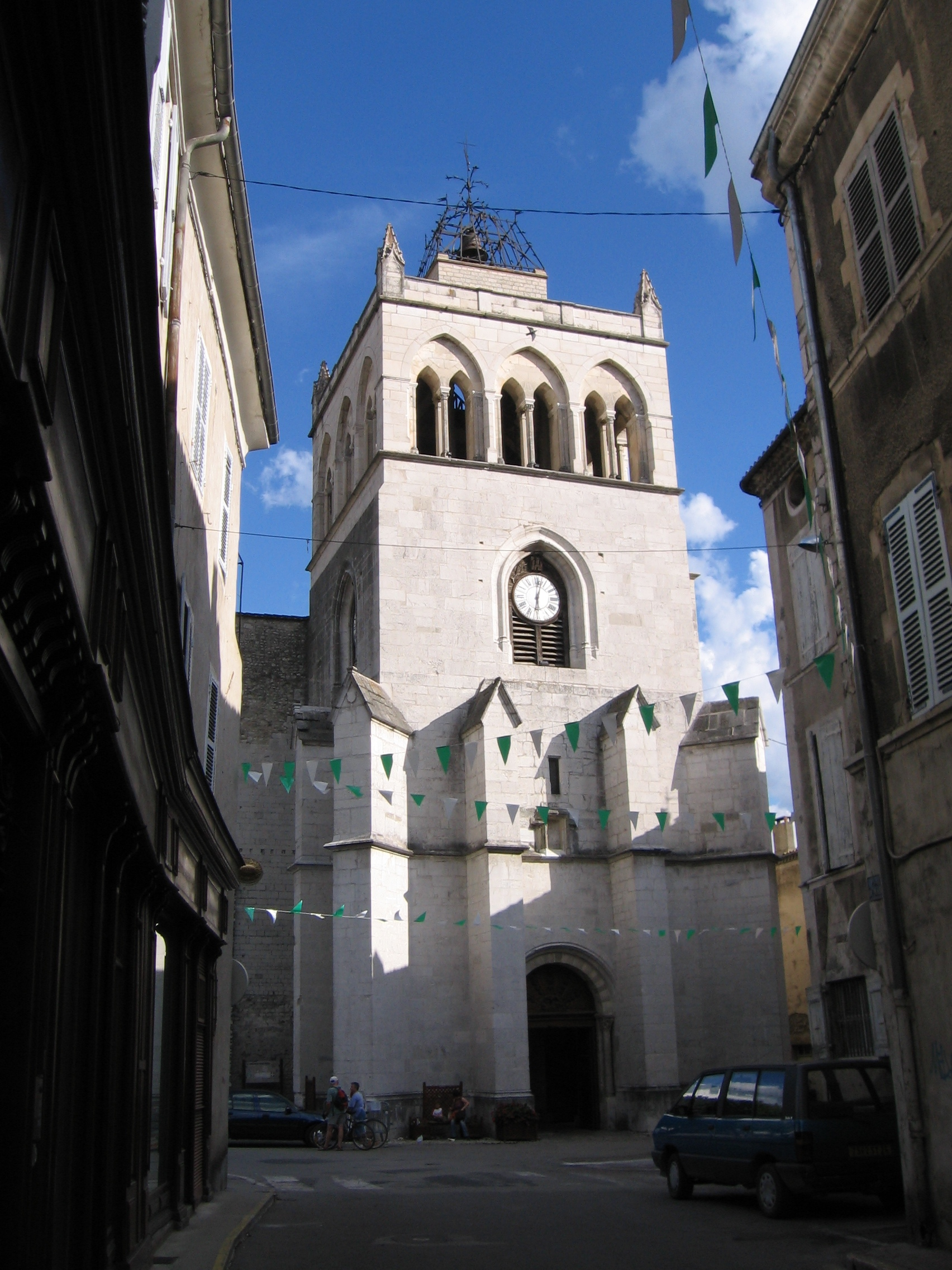
- Die Cathedral

Religion
- Affiliation: Roman Catholic Church
- Province: Bishop of Die
- Region: Drôme
- Rite: Roman
- Ecclesiastical or organisational status: Cathedral
- Status: Active

Location
- Location: Die, France
- Interactive map of Die Cathedral; Cathédrale Notre-Dame de Die

Architecture
- Type: church
- Style: Romanesque

Die Cathedral (French: Cathédrale Notre-Dame de Die) is a Roman Catholic church located in Die, Drôme, France. The former cathedral is a national monument.

Die Cathedral was previously the seat of the Bishop of Die. The diocese was not re-established after the French Revolution, but was annexed to the Diocese of Grenoble following the Concordat of 1801.
