= Schiphol Airport station =

Railway station in the Netherlands

Schiphol Airport
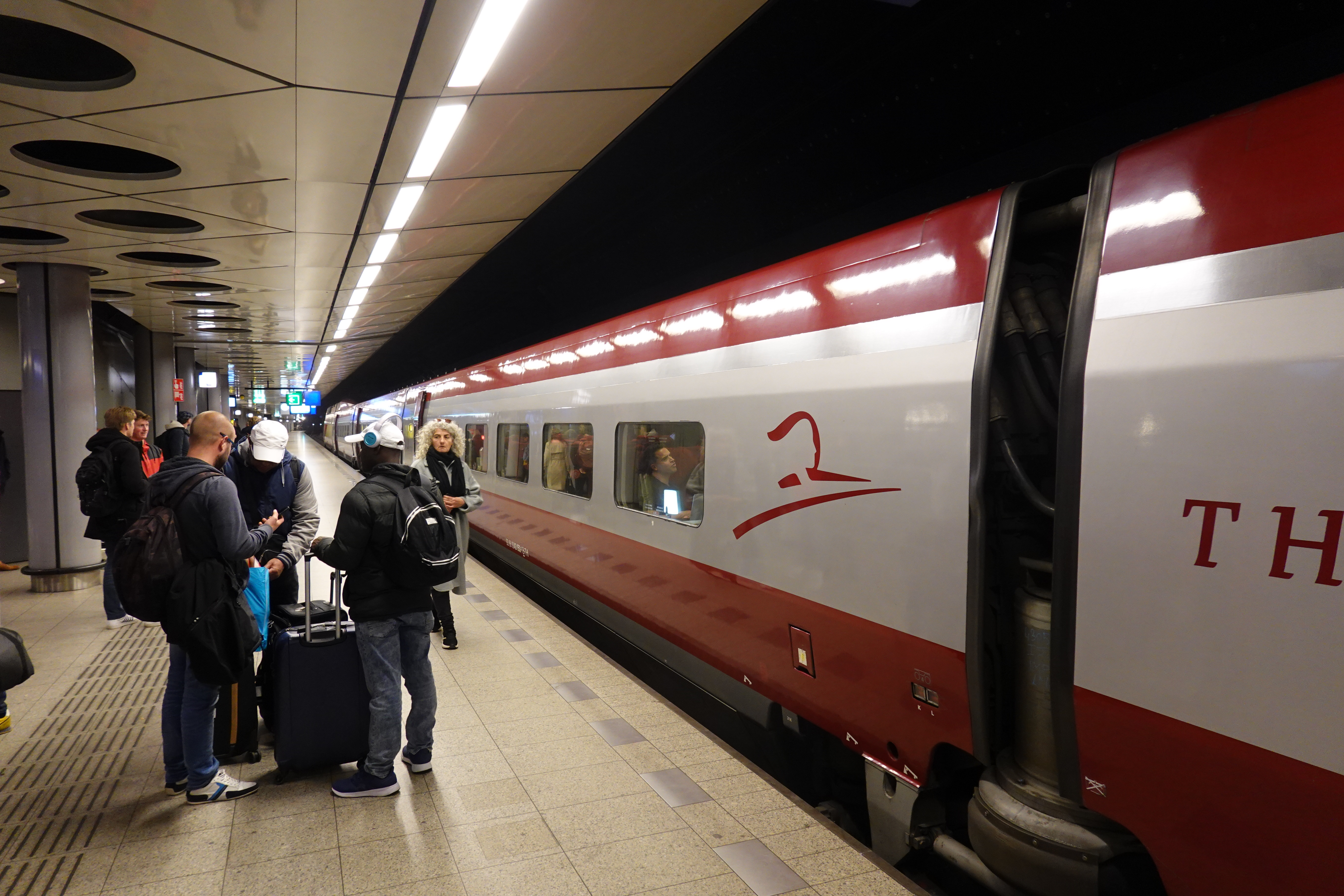
- Thalys high-speed train stopping at Schiphol Airport, 2022

General information
- Location: Amsterdam Airport Schiphol; Haarlemmermeer; Netherlands
- Coordinates: 52°18′32″N 4°45′42″E
- Operator: Nederlandse Spoorwegen; NS International; Arriva; Eurostar; European Sleeper
- Lines: Amsterdam–Schiphol railway; Weesp–Leiden railway
- Platforms: 6
- Connections: Arriva: 1, 3; Qbuzz: 361, 365, 470, 858, N70; Connexxion: 180, 181, 185, 186, 189, 190, 191, 194, 195, 198, 199, 200, 300, 341, 397, N30, N90, N97; GVB: 245, 246, 247, 369

Construction
- Structure type: Underground
- Accessible: Yes

Other information
- Station code: Shl

History
- Opened: 21 December 1978; 47 years ago
- Rebuilt: 1995; 31 years ago
Services
Preceding station	Eurostar	Following station
Rotterdam Centraal towards Paris-Nord	Eurostar	Amsterdam Centraal Terminus
Rotterdam Centraal towards Disneyland Paris, Marseille or Bourg-Saint-Maurice	Eurostar	Amsterdam Centraal Terminus
Rotterdam Centraal towards Bourg-Saint-Maurice	Eurostar (winter)	Amsterdam Centraal Terminus
Rotterdam Centraal towards Marseille-Saint-Charles	Eurostar (summer)	Amsterdam Centraal Terminus
Preceding station	NS International	Following station
Rotterdam Centraal towards Brussels-South	Eurocity Direct 9500	Amsterdam Zuid towards Lelystad Centrum
Preceding station	Nederlandse Spoorwegen	Following station
Terminus	NS Intercity 700	Amsterdam Zuid towards Groningen
Terminus	NS Intercity 800	Amsterdam Zuid towards Leeuwarden
Leiden Centraal towards Rotterdam Centraal	NS Nachtnet 1400 No service Tues, Wed	Amsterdam Centraal towards Utrecht Centraal
Rotterdam Centraal towards Breda	NS Intercity Direct 1800	Amsterdam Zuid towards Amersfoort Schothorst
Rotterdam Centraal Terminus	NS Intercity Direct 2400 Mon-Sat until 20:00	Amsterdam Zuid towards Lelystad Centrum
Leiden Centraal towards Den Haag Centraal	NS Intercity 3100	Amsterdam Zuid towards Nijmegen
Leiden Centraal towards Rotterdam Centraal	NS Intercity 3200 Mon-Thurs before 19:00	Amsterdam Zuid towards Arnhem Centraal
Leiden Centraal towards Dordrecht	NS Intercity 3500	Amsterdam Zuid towards Venlo
Leiden Centraal towards Rotterdam Centraal	NS Nachtnet 11400 Wednesday Night only	Amsterdam Centraal towards Utrecht Centraal
Leiden Centraal Terminus	NS Nachtnet 11450 Tuesday Night only	Amsterdam Bijlmer ArenA Terminus
Rotterdam Centraal Terminus	NS Intercity Direct 12400 After 20:00 and Sundays	Amsterdam Zuid Terminus
Hoofddorp Terminus	NS Sprinter 4100	Amsterdam Lelylaan towards Hoorn Kersenboogerd
Hoofddorp towards Den Haag Centraal	NS Sprinter 4300	Amsterdam Zuid towards Lelystad Centrum
Hoofddorp towards Leiden Centraal	NS Sprinter 5700 Not after 20:30	Amsterdam Zuid towards Utrecht Centraal
Hoofddorp Terminus	NS Sprinter 8100	Amsterdam Lelylaan towards Amsterdam Centraal
Hoofddorp Terminus	NS Sprinter 8200	Amsterdam Lelylaan towards Amsterdam Centraal
Hoofddorp Terminus	NS Sprinter 8300	Amsterdam Lelylaan towards Amsterdam Centraal
Hoofddorp Terminus	NS Sprinter 8400	Amsterdam Lelylaan towards Amsterdam Centraal
Preceding station	Arriva Netherlands	Following station
Terminus	Nachttrein 32710 Friday night only	Amsterdam Centraal towards Maastricht
Terminus	Nachttrein 32780 Friday night only	Amsterdam Centraal towards Groningen
Route map
Location
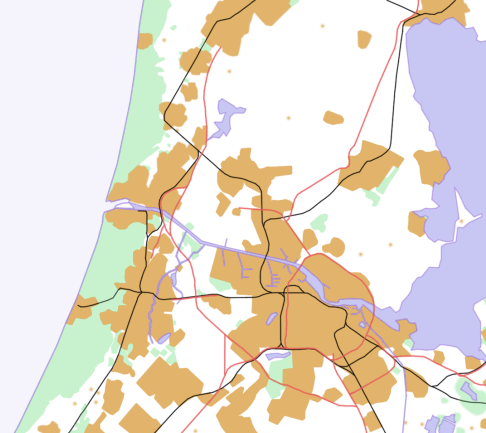
- Location within Northern Randstad Location within Netherlands

Schiphol Airport station is a major passenger railway station in Haarlemmermeer, Netherlands, beneath the terminal complex of Amsterdam Airport Schiphol, operated by the Nederlandse Spoorwegen. The station's six platforms are accessible via twelve escalators and three elevators located in the main concourse of the airport (Schiphol Plaza). The original station was opened in 1978, and the current station in 1995. It connects the airport to Amsterdam and other cities in the Netherlands, as well as to Belgium and France.

== History ==
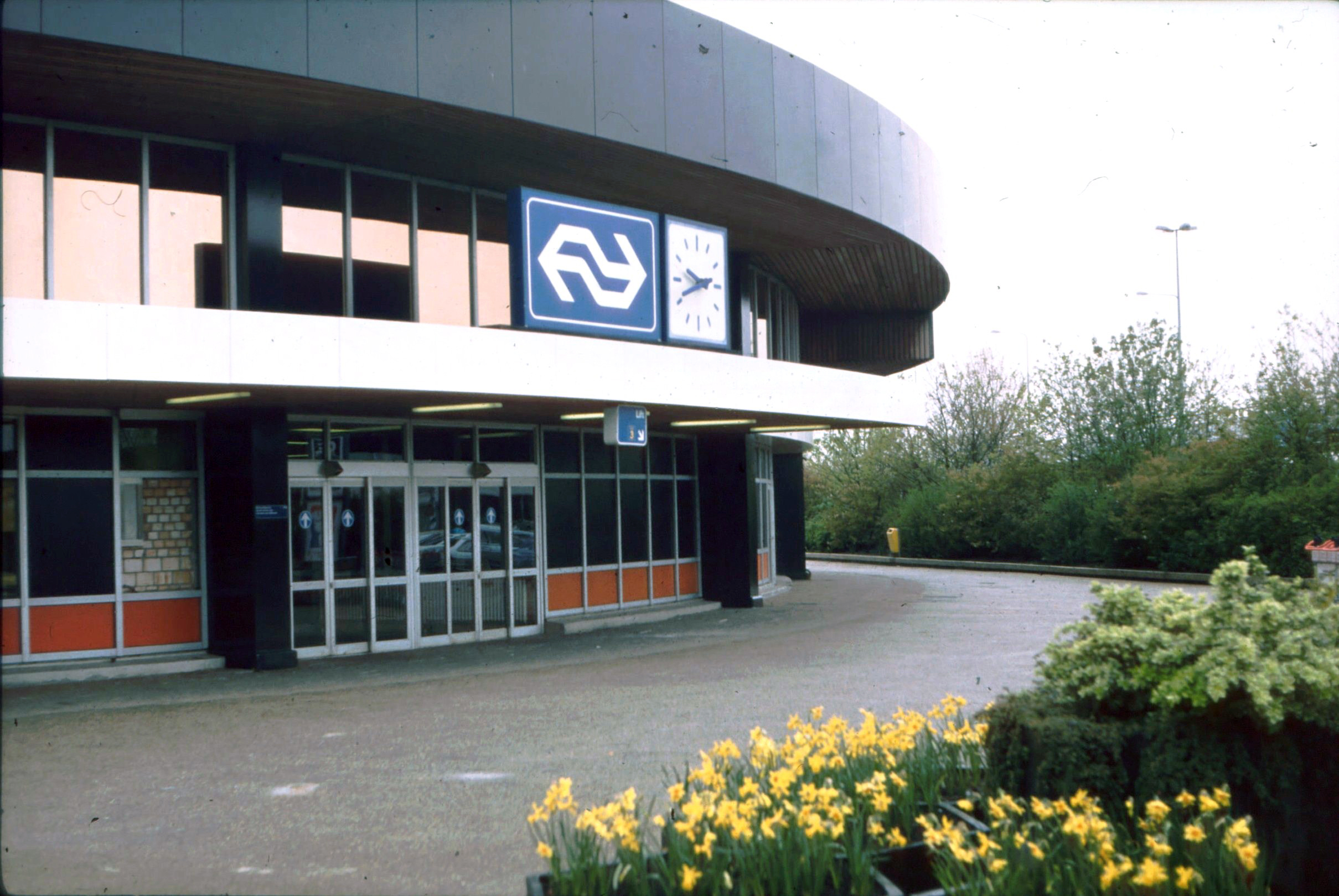
Former entrance of the railway station in 1989, demolished in 1995

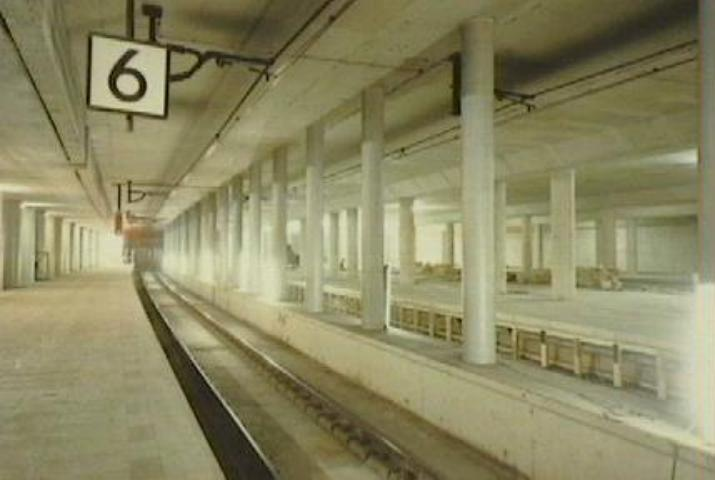
Rail tunnel and underground platforms of the station under construction in 1992

The original railway station at Schiphol was partly at street level and opened on 21 December 1978.

Initially, passengers could only travel as far as Amsterdam's Zuid WTC and RAI stations, as well as south bound towards Leiden, The Hague and Rotterdam. For trips to Amsterdam Centraal station, passengers had to travel to RAI and transfer to a local train. A direct link was created with the construction of the Amsterdam-Schiphol railway in 1986.

A newly built underground station opened in 1995; the former building was demolished. As Amsterdam Airport Schiphol, which surrounds the railway station, is the largest airport within the Netherlands and the primary international gateway, Schiphol railway station changed into a major hub in the Dutch railway network.

The station was renamed Schiphol Airport on 13 December 2015 to make the station more recognizable to international travelers.

== Station layout ==
There are 3 island platforms with a total of 6 tracks. What is special about this station is that the platforms are not only accessible via the usual escalators (3 per platform), fixed stairs (1 per platform) and elevators (1 per platform), but also via ramps (4 per platform). The ramps were intended for passengers to take their luggage on luggage trolleys. These were placed on the platforms for this purpose. The use of these trolleys on the platforms was later prohibited and made impossible by obstacles in the form of poles at the top of the ramps. Because air passengers started using roller suitcases on a large scale over the years, luggage trolleys were no longer as important as they used to be.

Since 2006, island platforms 1/2 and 5/6 have had flexible arrival and departure tracks, i.e., it is determined just a few minutes in advance on which of the two tracks (1 or 2, or 5 or 6 respectively), and thus on which side of the platform, a train will arrive and depart.

== Destinations ==
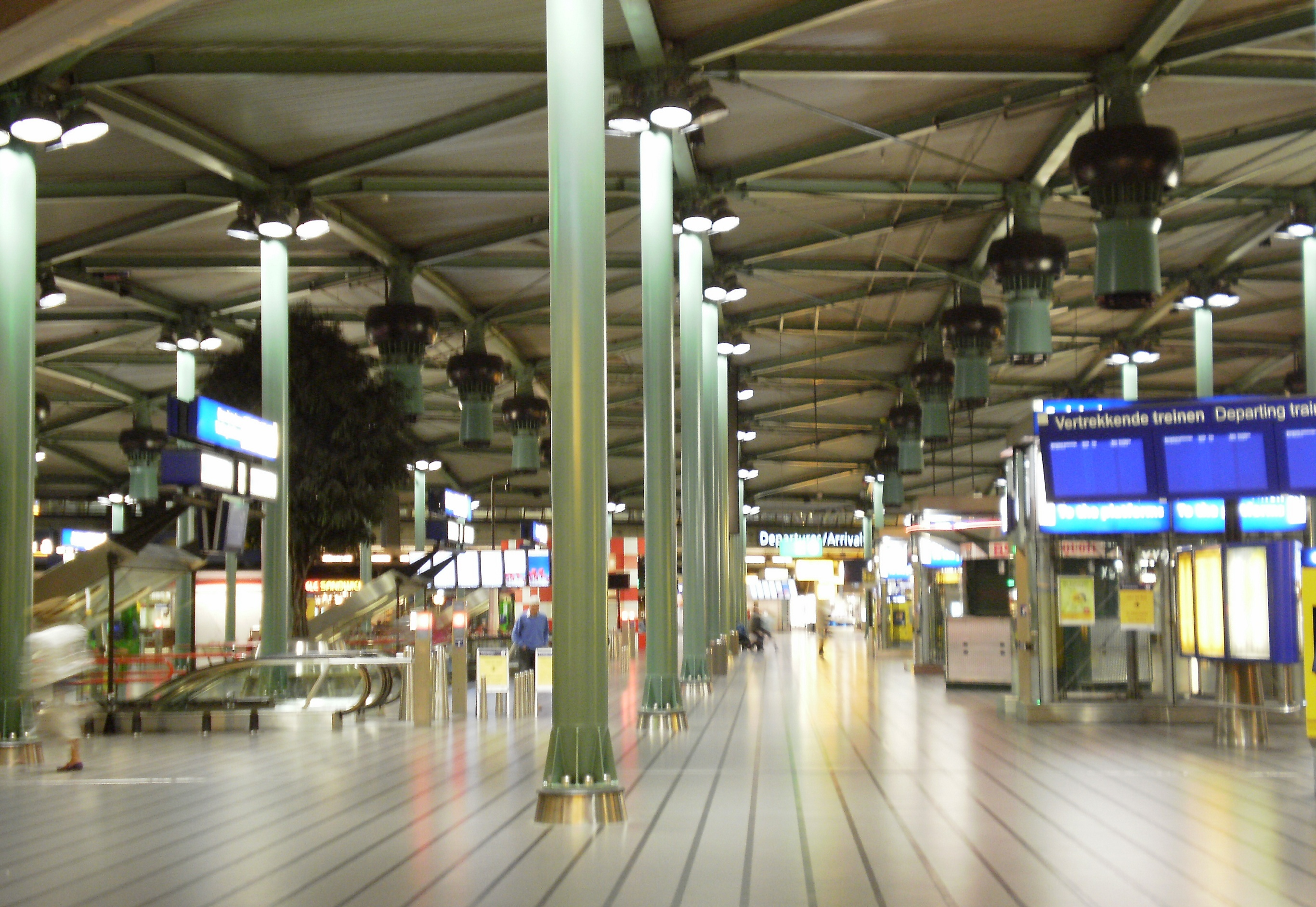
Main hall of the station, 2014

Schiphol station offers several trains per hour to Amsterdam Centraal and frequent services to the rest of the country as well. These include intercity services to Leiden, The Hague, Rotterdam, Utrecht, Eindhoven, Amersfoort, Almere, Lelystad, Apeldoorn, Deventer, Enschede, Groningen, Leeuwarden, Nijmegen and Zwolle.

During nighttime, an hourly service connects Schiphol with Amsterdam, Utrecht, Rotterdam, Delft, Leiden and The Hague between 1am and 5am.

The Eurostar, Intercity Direct and Intercity Brussels trains call at Schiphol railway station. These trains connect the airport to Rotterdam, Breda, Antwerp, Brussels Airport, Brussels and Paris.

Reservations are obligatory to board Eurostar trains. For Intercity Direct trains to Breda a supplemental fare is required for the high-speed stretch to Rotterdam.

== Train services ==
There are several types of train series in the Netherlands:

- Intercity Direct These are Intercity Services using the high speed network.
- InterCity These are express trains calling at major stations. The fastest type of regular train in the Netherlands.
- Sprinters These are trains calling at all stations and mostly are operated by SNG or SLT 'Sprinter' train sets.

Schiphol Airport is a station for many national and international connections. These following trains will stop at Schiphol in the 2025 timetable:

=== National rail ===
Train	Operator	Route
700	Intercity (NS)	Schiphol Airport – Amsterdam Zuid – Almere Centrum – Lelystad Centrum – Zwolle – Assen – Groningen
800	Intercity (NS)	Schiphol Airport – Amsterdam Zuid – Almere Centrum – Lelystad Centrum – Zwolle – Meppel – Leeuwarden
1400	Intercity (NS)	Utrecht Centraal – Amsterdam Centraal – Schiphol Airport – Den Haag HS – Rotterdam Centraal
3100	Intercity (NS)	Den Haag Centraal – Leiden Centraal – Schiphol Airport – Amsterdam Bijlmer ArenA – Utrecht Centraal – Veenendaal-De Klomp – Ede-Wageningen – Arnhem Centraal – Nijmegen
3200	Intercity (NS)	Arnhem Centraal – Ede-Wageningen – Utrecht Centraal – Amsterdam Zuid – Schiphol Airport – Leiden Centraal – Den Haag HS – Delft – Rotterdam Centraal
3500	Intercity (NS)	Dordrecht – Rotterdam Centraal – Schiedam Centrum – Delft – Den Haag HS – Leiden Centraal – Schiphol Airport – Amsterdam Zuid – Utrecht Centraal – 's-Hertogenbosch – Eindhoven Centraal – Helmond – Venlo
11400	Intercity (NS)	Leiden Centraal – Schiphol Airport – Amsterdam Bijlmer ArenA
1800	Intercity Direct (NS)	Breda – Rotterdam Centraal – Schiphol Airport – Amsterdam Zuid – Duivendrecht – Hilversum – Amersfoort Centraal – Amersfoort Schothorst
11800	Intercity Direct (NS)	Rotterdam Centraal – Schiphol Airport – Amsterdam Zuid
2400	Intercity Direct (NS)	Lelystad Centrum – Almere Buiten – Almere Centrum – Amsterdam Zuid – Schiphol Airport – Rotterdam Centraal
12400	Intercity Direct (NS)	Amsterdam Zuid – Schiphol Airport – Rotterdam Centraal
32700	Nachttrein (Arriva)	Maastricht – Sittard – Roermond – Weert – Eindhoven Centraal – 's-Hertogenbosch – Utrecht Centraal – Amsterdam Bijlmer ArenA – Amsterdam Zuid – Schiphol Airport
32780	Nachttrein (Arriva)	Groningen – Assen – Zwolle – Lelystad Centrum – Almere Centrum – Amsterdam Centraal – Schiphol Airport
4100	Sprinter (NS)	Hoofddorp – Schiphol Airport – Zaandam – Purmerend – Hoorn – Hoorn Kersenboogerd
4300	Sprinter (NS)	Den Haag Centraal – Leiden Centraal – Schiphol Airport – Amsterdam Zuid – Weesp – Almere Centrum – Almere Buiten – Almere Oostvaarders – Lelystad Centrum
5700	Sprinter (NS)	Utrecht Centraal – Hilversum – Weesp – Amsterdam Zuid – Schiphol Airport – Hoofddorp – Leiden Centraal
8100	Sprinter (NS)	Hoofddorp – Schiphol Airport – Amsterdam Sloterdijk – Amsterdam Centraal
8200	Sprinter (NS)	Hoofddorp – Schiphol Airport – Amsterdam Sloterdijk – Amsterdam Centraal
8300	Sprinter (NS)	Hoofddorp – Schiphol Airport – Amsterdam Sloterdijk – Amsterdam Centraal
8400	Sprinter (NS)	Hoofddorp – Schiphol Airport – Amsterdam Sloterdijk – Amsterdam Centraal

=== International rail ===
Train	Operator(s)	Route	Notes
Eurostar 9300	Eurostar	Amsterdam Centraal – Schiphol Airport – Rotterdam Centraal – Antwerpen-Centraal – Brussel-Zuid – Paris-Nord	Via HSL-Zuid. Various journeys only between Amsterdam and Brussels
Eurostar 9900	Eurostar	Amsterdam Centraal – Schiphol Airport – Rotterdam Centraal – Antwerpen-Centraal – Brussel-Zuid – [ Aéroport Charles-de-Gaulle 2 TGV – Marne-la-Vallée - Chessy ] / [ Chambéry-Challes-les-Eaux – Albertville – Moûtiers - Salins - Brides-les-Bains – Aime-La Plagne – Landry – Bourg-Saint-Maurice ] / [ Valence-Rhône-Alpes-Sud TGV – Avignon TGV – Aix-en-Provence TGV – Marseille Saint-Charles ]	Via HSL-Zuid. Marne-la-Vallée - Chessy 2 times a day. Bourg-Saint-Maurice 1 time a week in winter. Marseille Saint-Charles 1 time a week in summer.
9500	Eurocity Direct, Beneluxtrein (NS International)	Lelystad Centrum – Almere Buiten – Almere Centrum – Amsterdam Zuid – Schiphol Airport – Rotterdam Centraal – Antwerpen-Centraal – Brussel-Zuid	Via HSL-Zuid. Between Schiphol and Rotterdam, a surcharge is payable for travel within the Netherlands.

== Bus services ==
The following bus services depart from the bus platform outside the airport building. Italics indicates stops within the Schiphol area. All services are daily unless otherwise stated.

Timetable as of 2025:

- 1 Schiphol - Rozenburg Logistic Hub
- 3 Schiphol - Schiphol P3
- 180 Circular line Schiphol P30 – Schiphol – Schiphol P40 – Schiphol Knooppunt Noord – Schiphol Oost - Oude Meer - Schiphol Zuid - Rozenburg - Schiphol P30
- 181 Circular line Schiphol Knooppunt Noord – Schiphol P40 – Schiphol – Schiphol P30 - Rozenburg – Schiphol Zuid – Oude Meer - Schiphol Oost - Schiphol Knooppunt Noord
- 185 Schiphol plaza – Justice Complex
- 186 Schiphol P30 – Schiphol – Schiphol P40 – Schiphol Knooppunt Noord – KLM Head Office – Amstelveen Busstation
- 190 Schiphol P30 – Schiphol – Schiphol P40 – Schiphol Knooppunt Noord (also night service as N90)
- 191 Schiphol Knooppunt Noord – Schiphol P40 – Schiphol – Schiphol P30 – Schiphol Zuidoost (Anchoragelaan)
- 194 Schiphol P30 – Schiphol – Schiphol P40 – Schiphol Knooppunt Noord – Badhoevedorp – Lijnden - Osdorp De Aker
- 195 Schiphol P30 – Schiphol – Schiphol P40 – Schiphol Knooppunt Noord – Badhoevedorp – Slotervaart – Amsterdam Lelylaan
- 198 Schiphol - Schiphol Knooppunt Noord - Amstelveenseweg - Amsterdam Station Zuid
- 199 Schiphol P30 – Schiphol – Schiphol P40 – Schiphol Oost – Amstelveen Westwijk – Amstelveen Busstation
- 300 Haarlem – Hoofddorp – Schiphol – Schiphol Knooppunt Noord – Amstelveen – Ouderkerk a/d Amstel – Amsterdam Bijlmer ArenA (also night service as line N30)
- 341 Schiphol - Hoofddorp - Spaarne Gasthuis
- 361 Schiphol – Nieuw Vennep – Lisse – Sassenheim - Voorhout - Noordwijk
- 365 Schiphol – Leimuiderbrug - Weteringbrug - Oude Wetering - Roelofarendsveen – Leiderdorp – Leiden
- 369 Schiphol - Schiphol Knooppunt Noord - Nieuw Sloten - Osdorp - Slotermeer - Amsterdam Sloterdijk
- 397 Nieuw-Vennep – Hoofddorp – Schiphol – Schiphol P40 – Schiphol Knooppunt Noord – Amsterdam Amstelveenseweg – Amsterdam Leidseplein (City Centre) – Amsterdam Elandsgracht (also night service as line N97)
- 470 Schiphol – Leimuiden – Rijnsaterwoude - Woubrugge - Alphen a/d Rijn (also night service as line N70)
- 858 Schiphol – Keukenhof (March–May, only when Keukenhof is open)
- N30 IJmuiden - Driehuis – Haarlem – Hoofddorp – Schiphol – Amstelveen – Ouderkerk a/d Amstel – Amsterdam Bijlmer ArenA
- N70 Schiphol - Leimuiden - Rijnsaterwoude - Woubrugge - Alphen a/d Rijn
- N90 Schiphol P30 – Schiphol – Schiphol P40 – Schiphol Knooppunt Noord
- N97 Nieuw-Vennep – Hoofddorp – Schiphol – Schiphol P40 – Amsterdam Amstelveenseweg – Amsterdam Leidseplein (City Centre) – Amsterdam Elandsgracht – Amsterdam Centraal

"Schiphol Plaza" is the main bus stop in front of the terminal building.

Lines 180–199, 300, 341, 397 and nightlines N30, N90, N97 are operated by Connexxion.

Lines 1 and 3 are operated by Arriva.

Lines 361, 365, 470, 858 and nightline N70 are operated by Qbuzz.

Line 369 is operated by the GVB.

== Other facilities ==
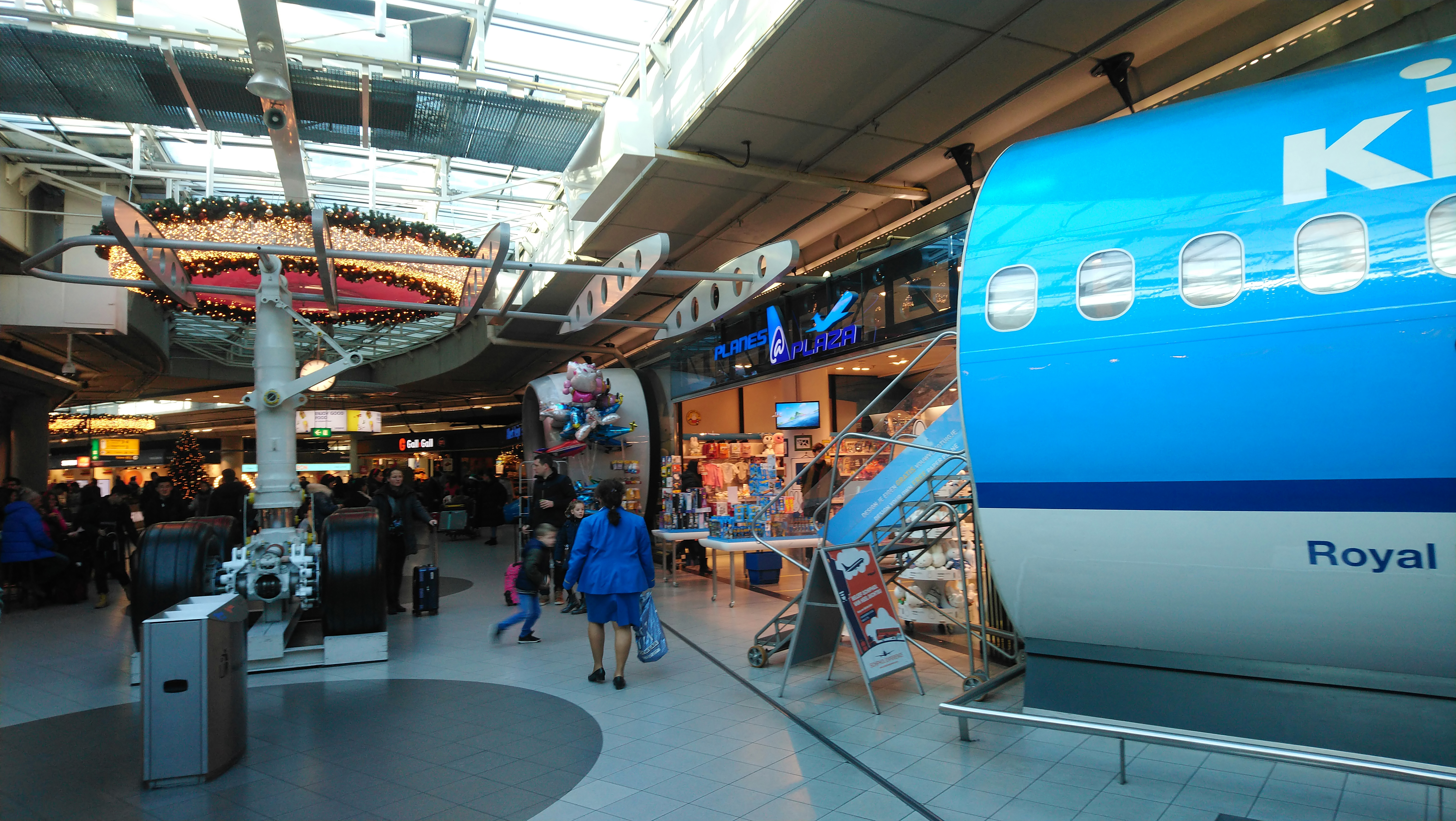
Airplane exhibit at the Plaza

Travelers have access to Schiphol Plaza, the airport's landside shopping centre, accessible to both air travelers and local customers. In addition to several smaller stores, Schiphol Plaza also contains two medium-sized supermarkets, Food Village and Albert Heijn. These supermarkets are open until midnight seven days a week. Soft-drink and snack machines are available on the platforms, as in most Dutch train stations.

Schiphol Plaza is getting an extension. This will create space for a separate train passenger area that will only be accessible via access gates. The renovation should start in 2022 and be completed in 2025, but has not yet started as of 2024.

== Gallery ==
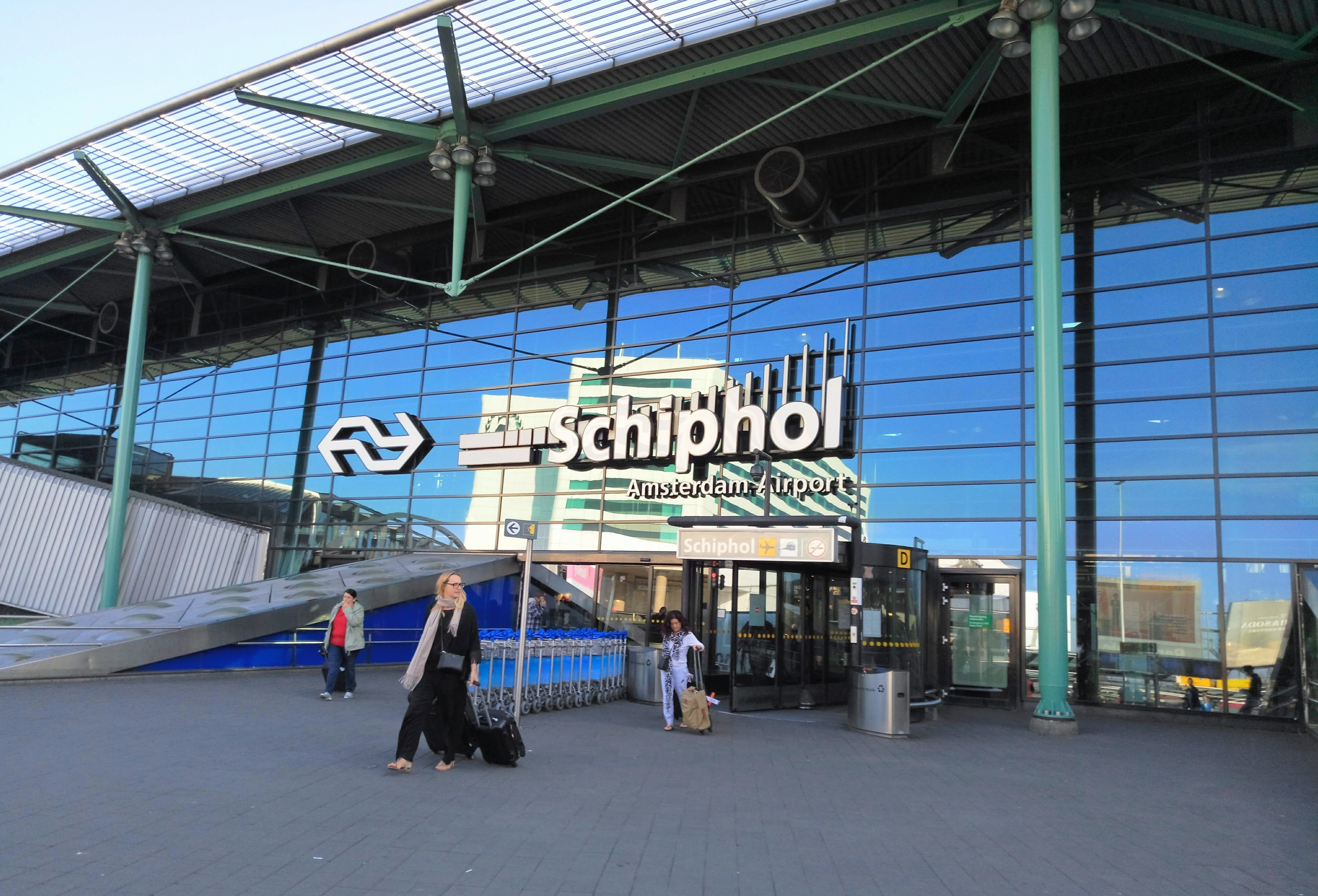
Entrance to the airport and railway station

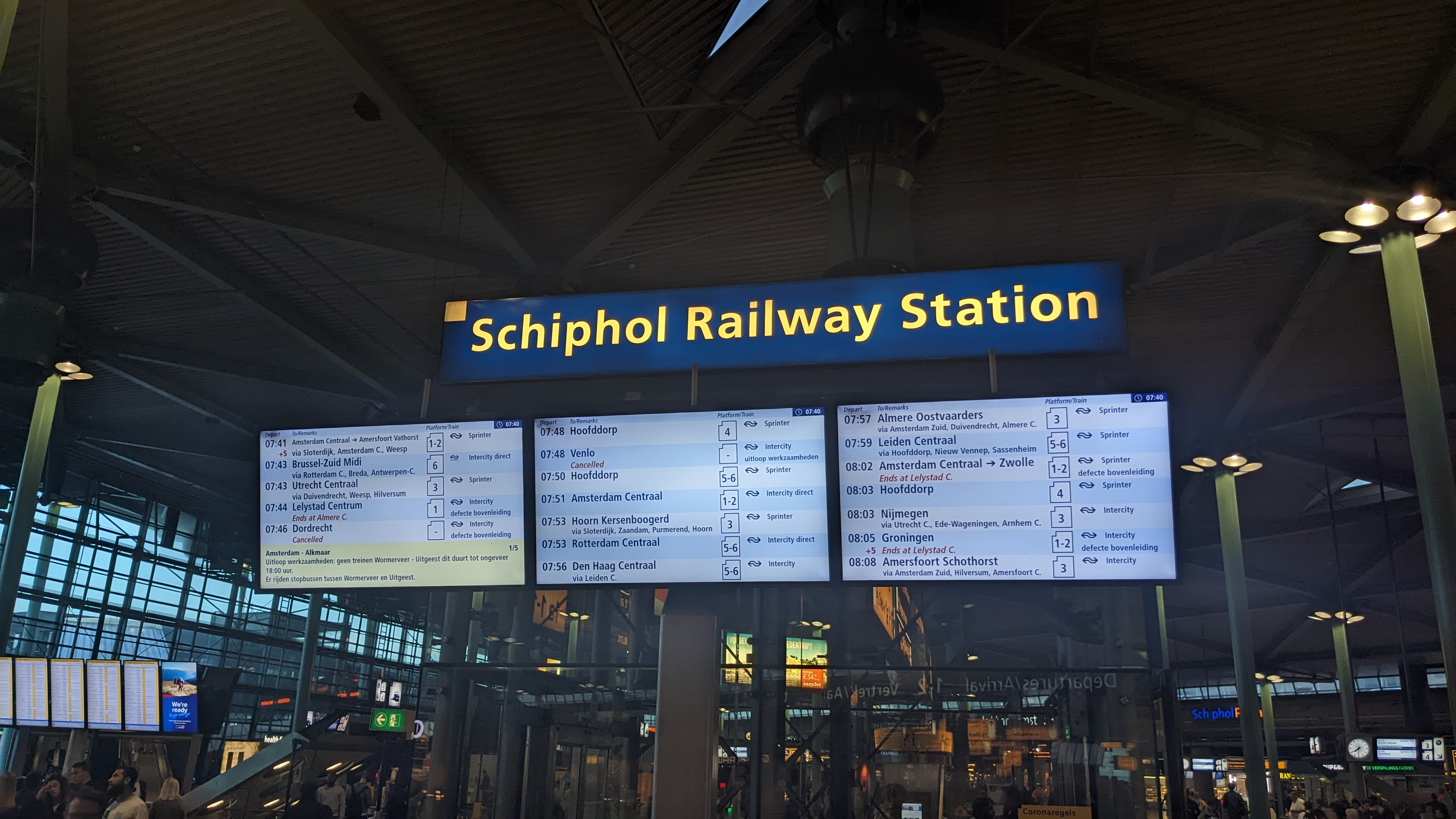
Train timetable for at Schiphol Plaza

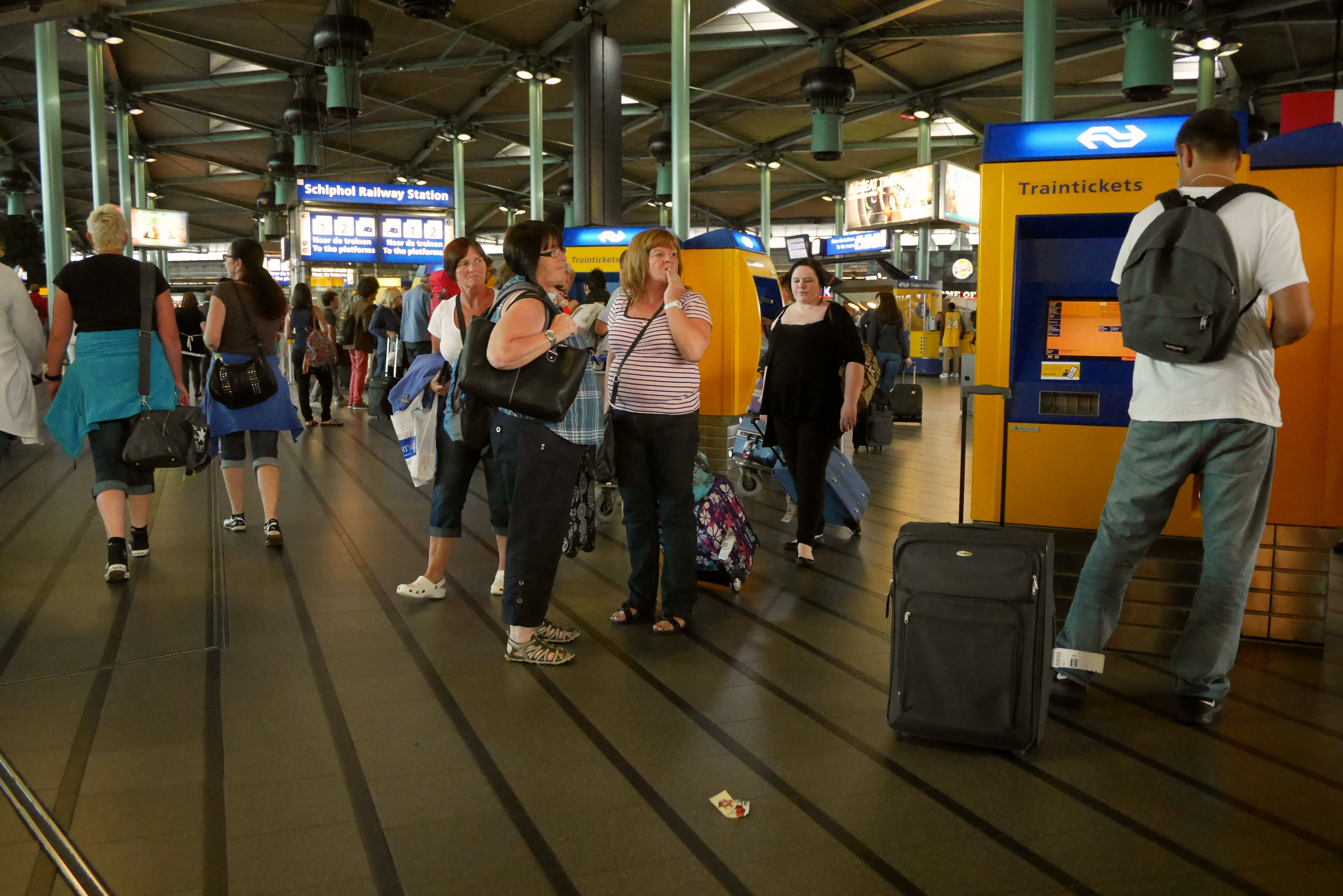
Ticket machines at Schiphol Plaza

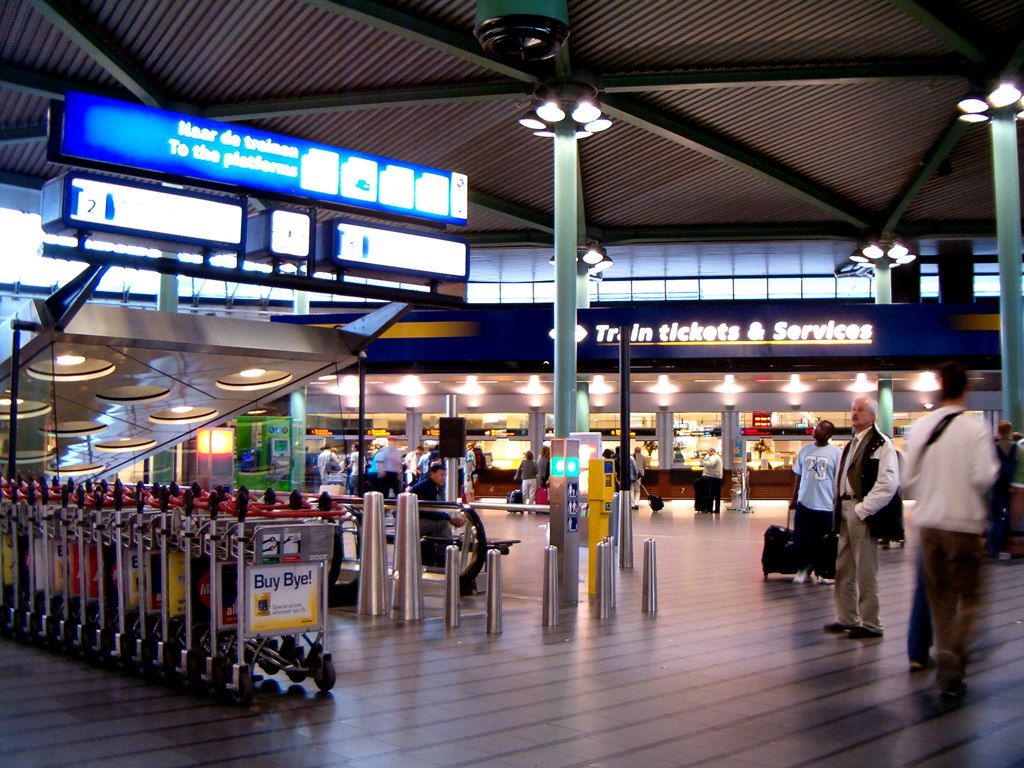
Entrance to the platform

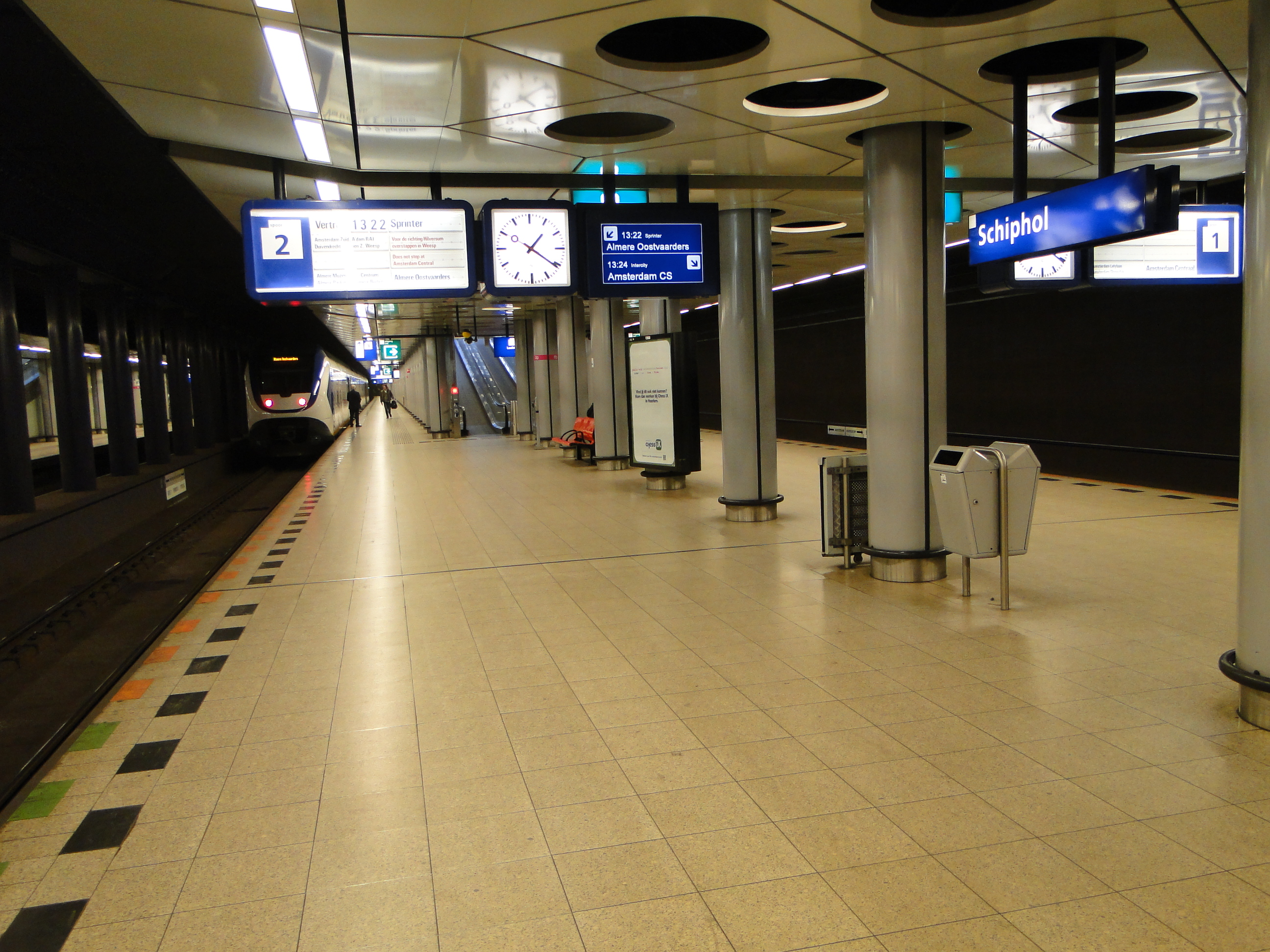
The station platforms at track 2

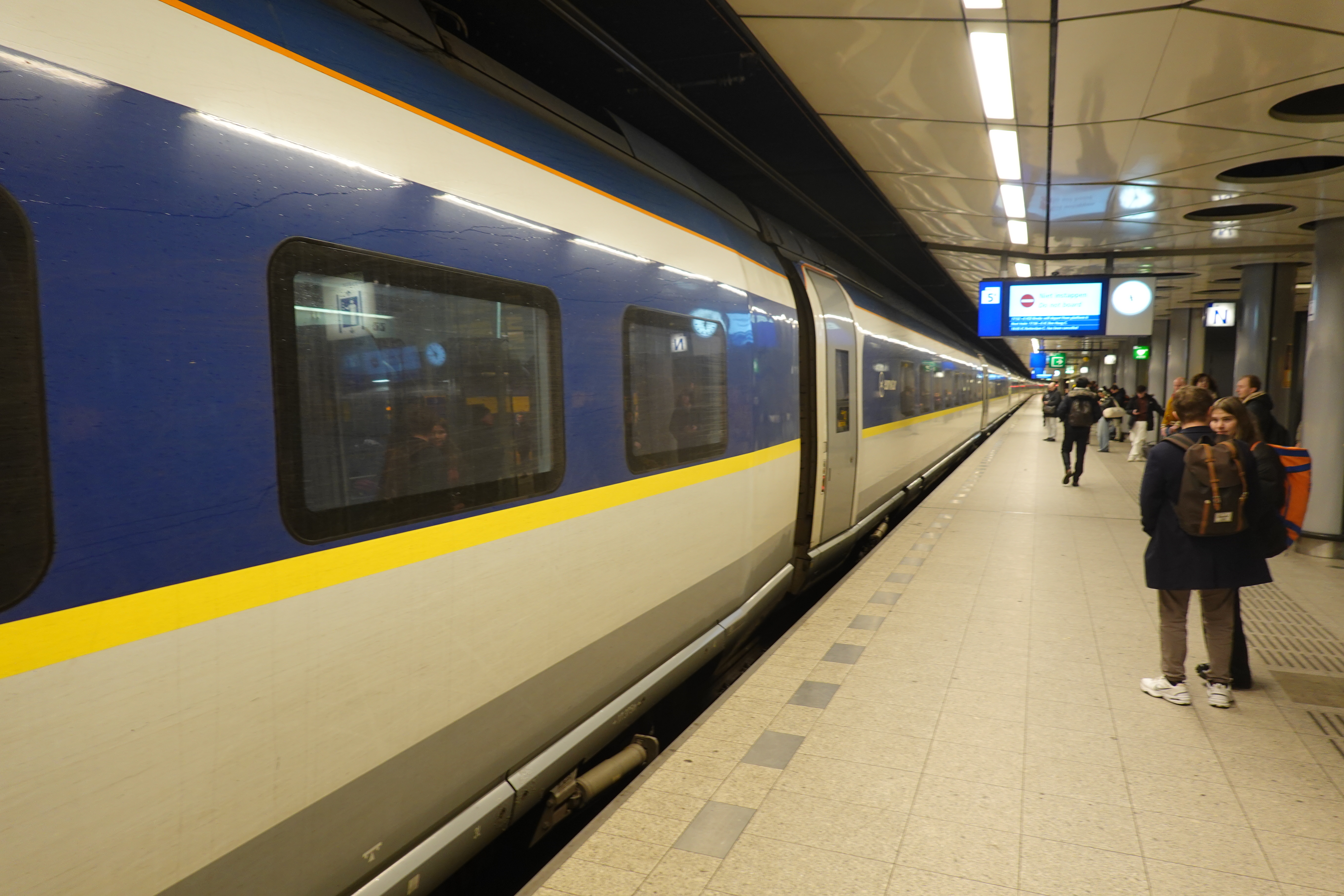
Eurostar stopping at Schiphol Airport

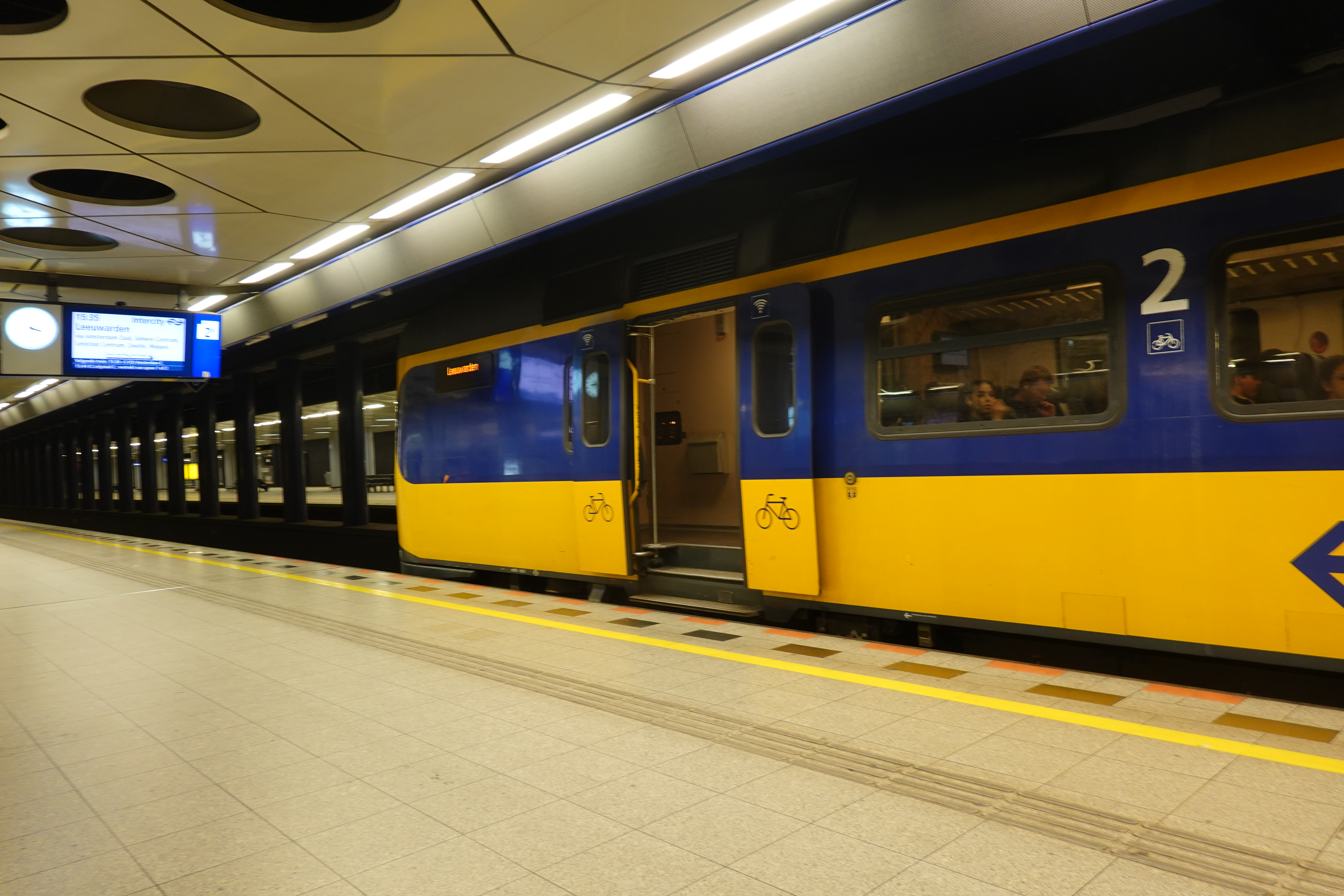
NS Intercity ICM stopping at Schiphol Airport
