= Notre-Dame-de-Briançon station =

French railway station

Notre-Dame-de-Briançon
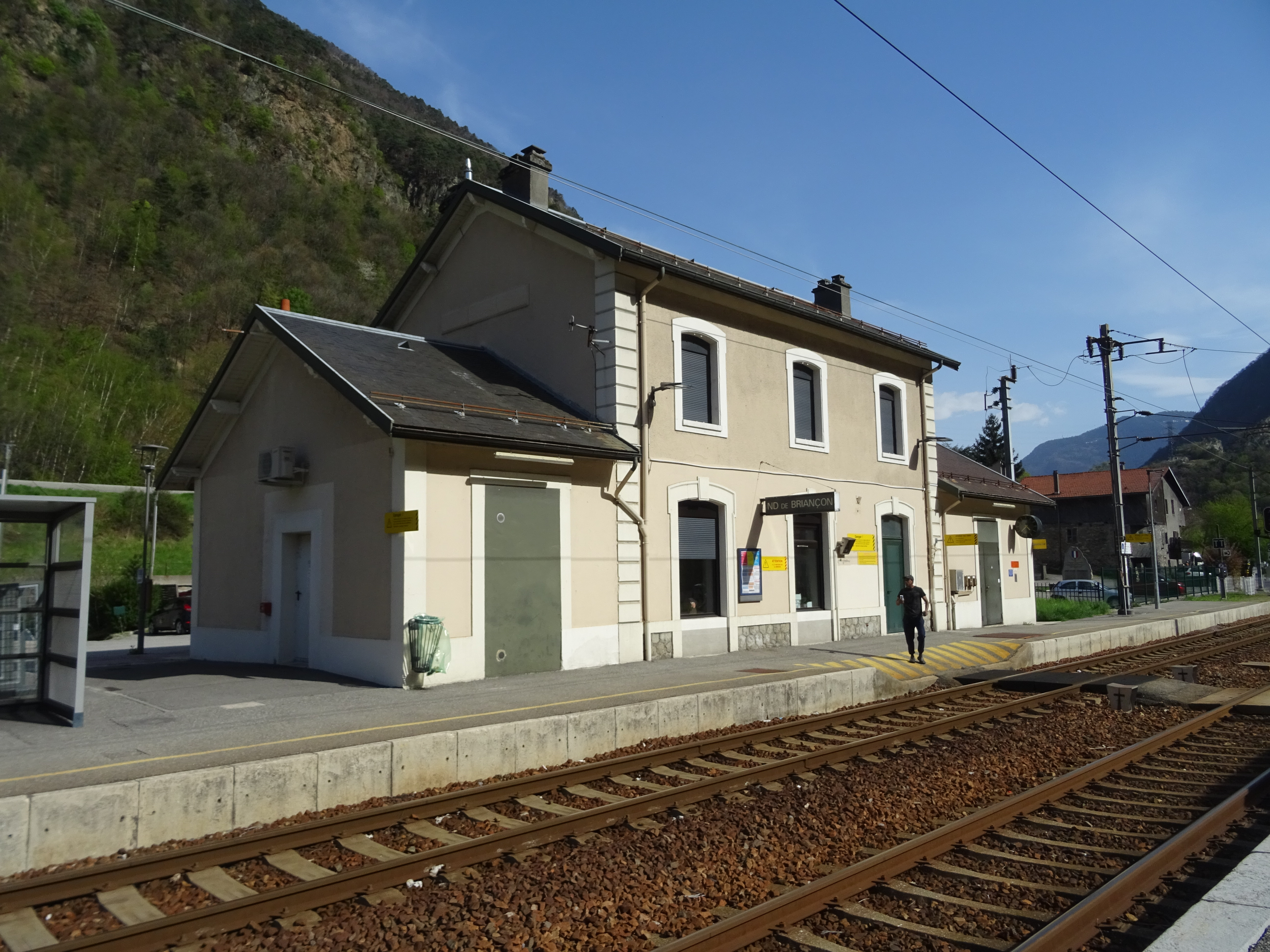
- Notre-Dame-de-Briançon railway station

General information
- Location: La Léchère, Savoie, Auvergne-Rhône-Alpes, France
- Coordinates: 45°32′22″N 6°28′07″E
- Line: Saint-Pierre-d'Albigny–Bourg-Saint-Maurice railway
- Platforms: 2
- Tracks: 2

Other information
- Station code: 87741694

History
- Opened: 1 June 1893

Services
Preceding station	TER Auvergne-Rhône-Alpes	Following station
Albertville towards Chambéry	52	Moûtiers-Salins-Brides-les-Bains towards Bourg-Saint-Maurice
Location

Notre-Dame-de-Briançon station (French: Gare de Notre-Dame-de-Briançon) is a railway station in La Léchère, Savoie, Southeastern France. The station, opened on 1 June 1893 by the Chemins de fer de Paris à Lyon et à la Méditerranée (PLM), is located on the railway from Saint-Pierre-d'Albigny to Bourg-Saint-Maurice. Train services at Notre-Dame-de-Briançon are operated by the SNCF.

== Train services ==
The following services call at Notre-Dame-de-Briançon as of 2022:

- Regional services (TER Auvergne-Rhône-Alpes) Chambéry - St-Pierre-d'Albigny - Albertville - Bourg-Saint-Maurice
