= Frontenex station =

French railway station

Frontenex
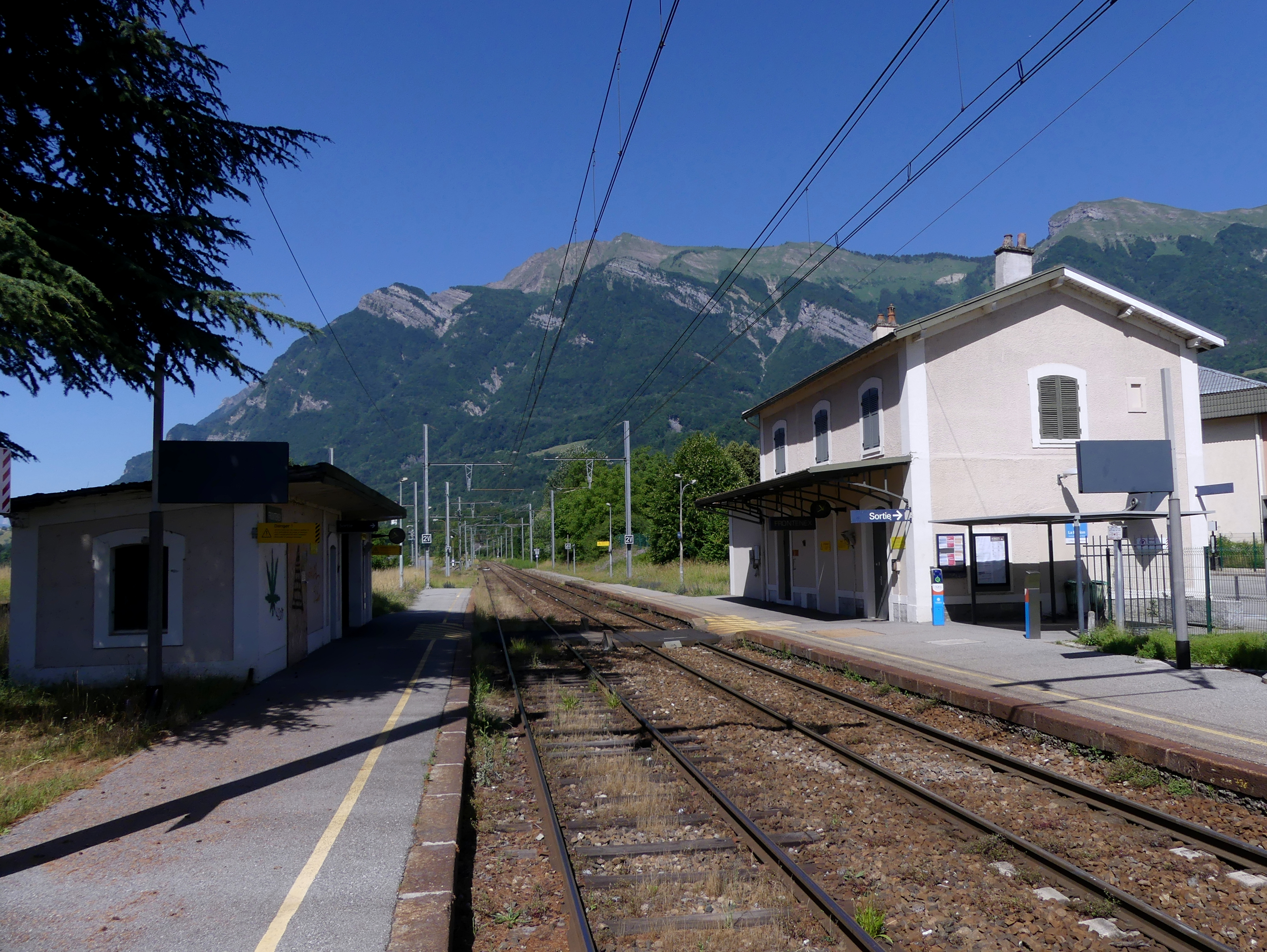
- Frontenex railway station

General information
- Location: Frontenex, Savoie, Auvergne-Rhône-Alpes, France
- Coordinates: 45°37′50″N 6°18′51″E
- Line: Saint-Pierre-d'Albigny–Bourg-Saint-Maurice railway
- Platforms: 2
- Tracks: 2

Other information
- Station code: 87741629

History
- Opened: 27 October 1879

Services
Preceding station	TER Auvergne-Rhône-Alpes	Following station
Grésy-sur-Isère towards Chambéry	52	Albertville towards Bourg-Saint-Maurice
Location

Frontenex station (French: Gare de Frontenex) is a railway station in Frontenex, Savoie, Southeastern France. The station, opened on 27 October 1879 by the Chemins de fer de Paris à Lyon et à la Méditerranée (PLM), is located on the railway from Saint-Pierre-d'Albigny to Bourg-Saint-Maurice. Train services at Frontenex are operated by the SNCF.

== Train services ==
The following services call at Frontenex as of 2022:

- Regional services (TER Auvergne-Rhône-Alpes) Chambéry - St-Pierre-d'Albigny - Albertville - Bourg-Saint-Maurice
