= Grésy-sur-Isère station =

French railway station

Grésy-sur-Isère
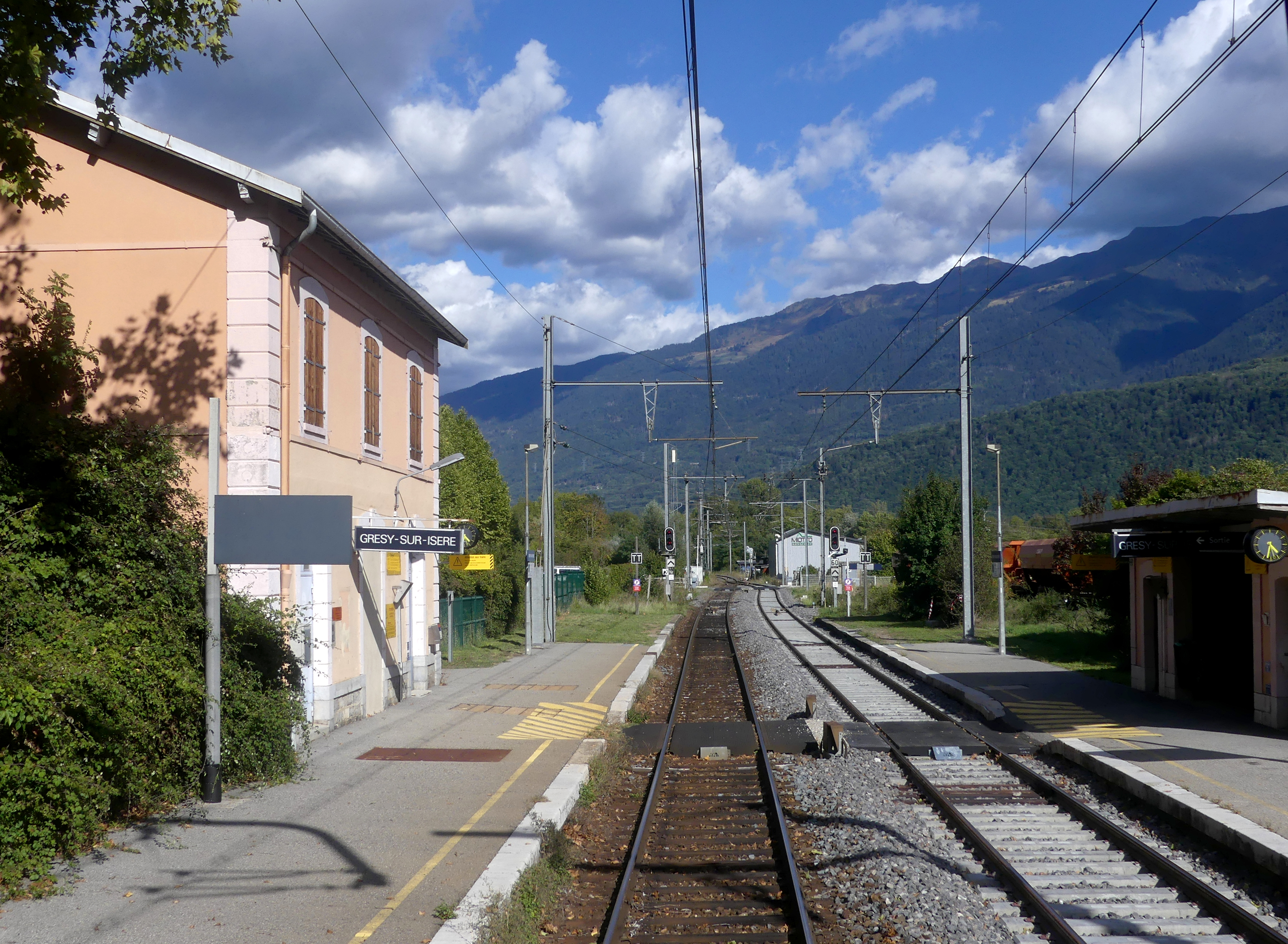
- Grésy-sur-Isère railway station

General information
- Location: Grésy-sur-Isère, Savoie, Auvergne-Rhône-Alpes, France
- Coordinates: 45°35′40″N 6°15′32″E
- Line: Saint-Pierre-d'Albigny–Bourg-Saint-Maurice railway
- Platforms: 2
- Tracks: 2

Other information
- Station code: 87741611

History
- Opened: 27 October 1879

Services
| Preceding station | TER Auvergne-Rhône-Alpes | Following station |
|---|---|---|
| Saint-Pierre-d'Albigny towards Chambéry | 52 | Frontenex towards Bourg-Saint-Maurice |
Location

Grésy-sur-Isère station (French: Gare de Grésy-sur-Isère) is a railway station in Grésy-sur-Isère, Savoie, Southeastern France. The station, opened on 27 October 1879 by the Chemins de fer de Paris à Lyon et à la Méditerranée (PLM), is located on the railway from Saint-Pierre-d'Albigny to Bourg-Saint-Maurice. Train services at Grésy-sur-Isère are operated by the SNCF.

== Train services ==
The following services call at Grésy-sur-Isère as of 2022:

- Regional services (TER Auvergne-Rhône-Alpes) Chambéry - St-Pierre-d'Albigny - Albertville - Bourg-Saint-Maurice
