= Aime–La Plagne station =

Railway station in Aime, France

Aime–La Plagne
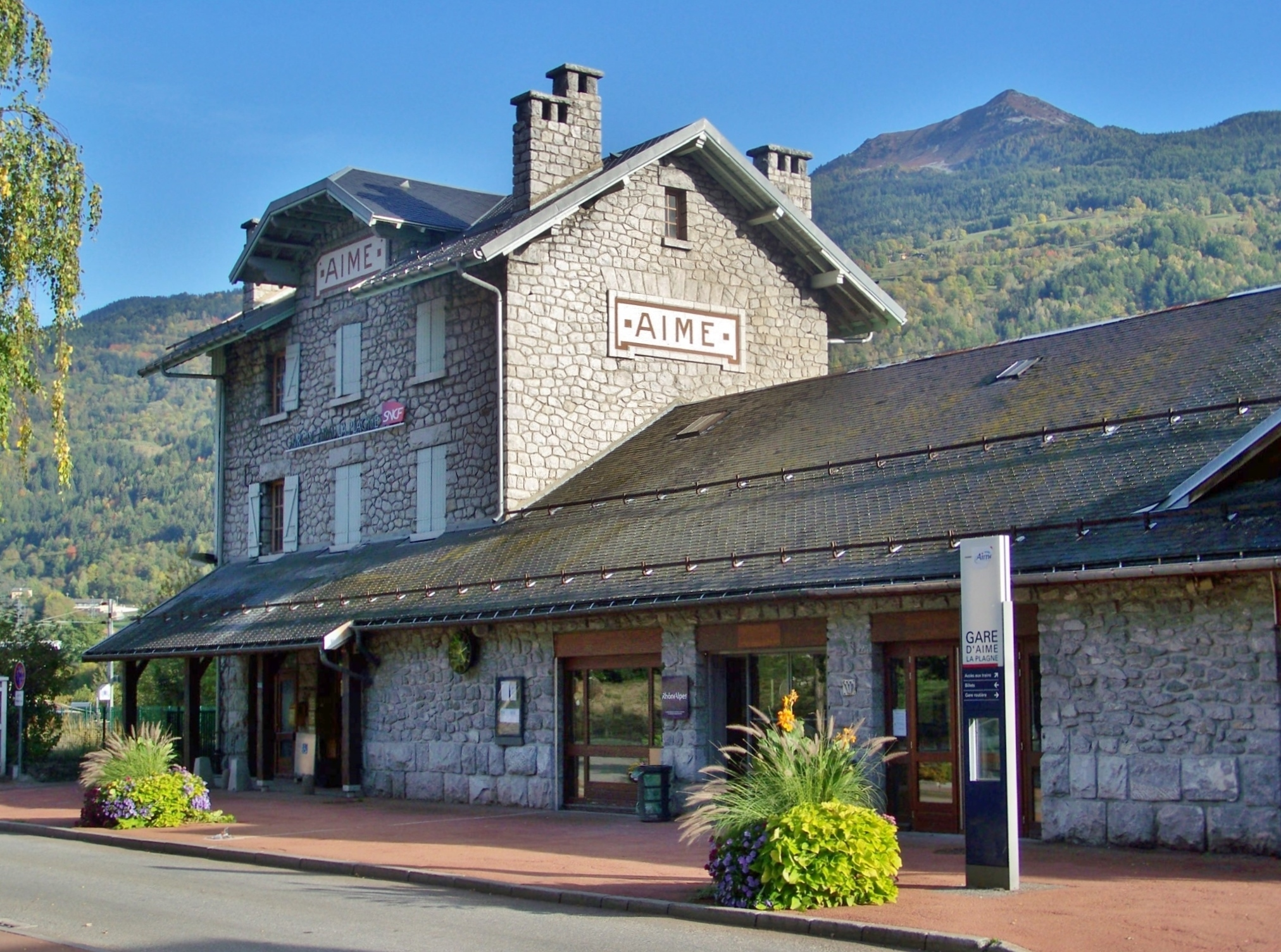
- Aime-La Plagne railway station

General information
- Location: 128 avenue de la Gare; 73210 Aime; Savoie; France
- Coordinates: 45°33′16″N 6°38′55″E
- Owner: SNCF
- Operator: SNCF
- Line: Saint-Pierre-d'Albigny–Bourg-Saint-Maurice railway
- Platforms: 2
- Tracks: 2

Other information
- Station code: 87741769

Passengers
- 2022: 126,465

Services
Preceding station	TER Auvergne-Rhône-Alpes	Following station
Moûtiers-Salins-Brides-les-Bains towards Chambéry	52	Landry towards Bourg-Saint-Maurice
Preceding station	SNCF	Following station
Moûtiers-Salins-Brides-les-Bains towards Paris-Lyon	TGV	Landry towards Bourg-Saint-Maurice
Preceding station	Ouigo	Following station
Moûtiers-Salins-Brides-les-Bains towards Paris-Lyon	Grande Vitesse	Bourg-Saint-Maurice Terminus
Preceding station	Eurostar	Following station
Moûtiers-Salins-Brides-les-Bains towards Amsterdam Centraal	Eurostar (winter)	Landry towards Bourg-Saint-Maurice
Location

Gare d'Aime-La Plagne is a railway station located in Aime, Savoie, south-eastern France. The station is located on the Saint-Pierre-d'Albigny - Bourg-Saint-Maurice railway. The train services are operated by SNCF. It serves the village of Aime and the neighbouring ski resort, La Plagne. The station is served by TGV and Eurostar high speed services, as well as local TER Auvergne-Rhône-Alpes services.

== Services ==
- High speed services (TGV) Paris - Chambéry - Albertville - Bourg-Saint-Maurice
- Local services (TER Auvergne-Rhône-Alpes) (Lyon -) Chambéry - St-Pierre-d'Albigny - Albertville - Bourg-Saint-Maurice

These services operate during the winter ski season:

- High speed services (Eurostar) Amsterdam/Lille - Brussels - Chambéry - Bourg-Saint-Maurice
