= Albertville station =

French railway station

Albertville
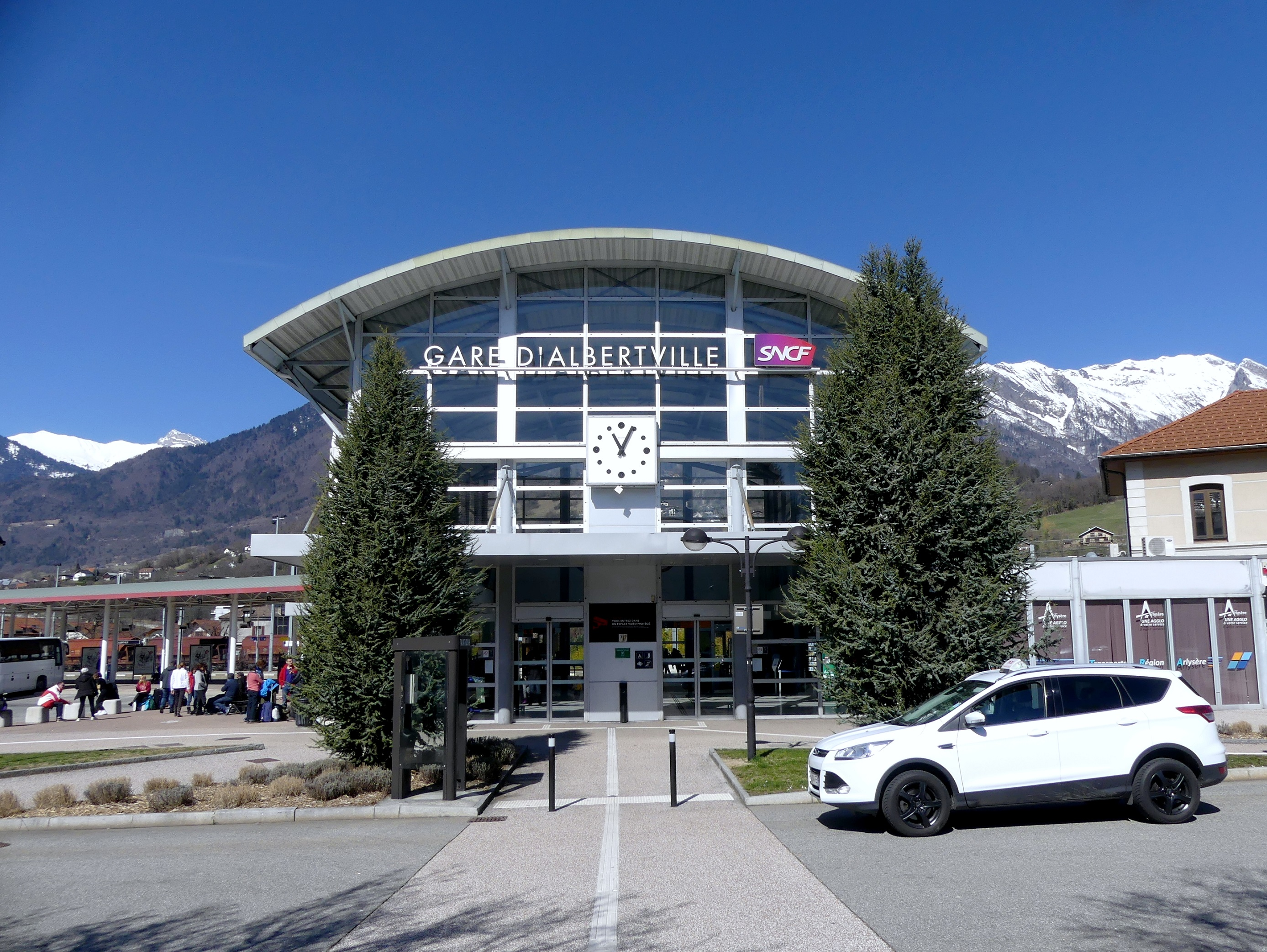
- Albertville railway station

General information
- Location: Albertville, Savoie, Auvergne-Rhône-Alpes, France
- Coordinates: 45°40′23″N 6°22′54″E
- Lines: Saint-Pierre-d'Albigny–Bourg-Saint-Maurice railway Annecy–Albertville railway
- Platforms: 1 bay platform 1 side platform 1 island platform
- Tracks: 12 (4 with platform)

Other information
- Station code: 87741645

History
- Opened: 27 October 1879

Services
Preceding station	TER Auvergne-Rhône-Alpes	Following station
Frontenex towards Chambéry	52	Notre-Dame-de-Briançon towards Bourg-Saint-Maurice
Preceding station	Ouigo	Following station
Grenoble towards Paris-Lyon	Grande Vitesse	Moûtiers-Salins-Brides-les-Bains towards Bourg-Saint-Maurice
Preceding station	Eurostar	Following station
Chambéry towards Amsterdam Centraal	Eurostar (winter)	Moûtiers-Salins-Brides-les-Bains towards Bourg-Saint-Maurice
Location

Albertville station (French: Gare d'Albertville) is a railway station in Albertville, Savoie, Southeastern France. The station, opened on 27 October 1879 by the Chemins de fer de Paris à Lyon et à la Méditerranée (PLM), is located on both the railway from Saint-Pierre-d'Albigny to Bourg-Saint-Maurice and from Annecy to Albertville. Train services at Albertville are operated by the SNCF.

== Train services ==
The following services call at Albertville as of 2022:

- Regional services (TER Auvergne-Rhône-Alpes) Chambéry - St-Pierre-d'Albigny - Albertville - Bourg-Saint-Maurice
- High speed services (Eurostar) Amsterdam - Brussels - Chambéry - Bourg-Saint-Maurice (Winter only)
