= Moûtiers–Salins–Brides-les-Bains station =

Railway station in Moûtiers, France

Moûtiers Salins–Brides-les-Bains
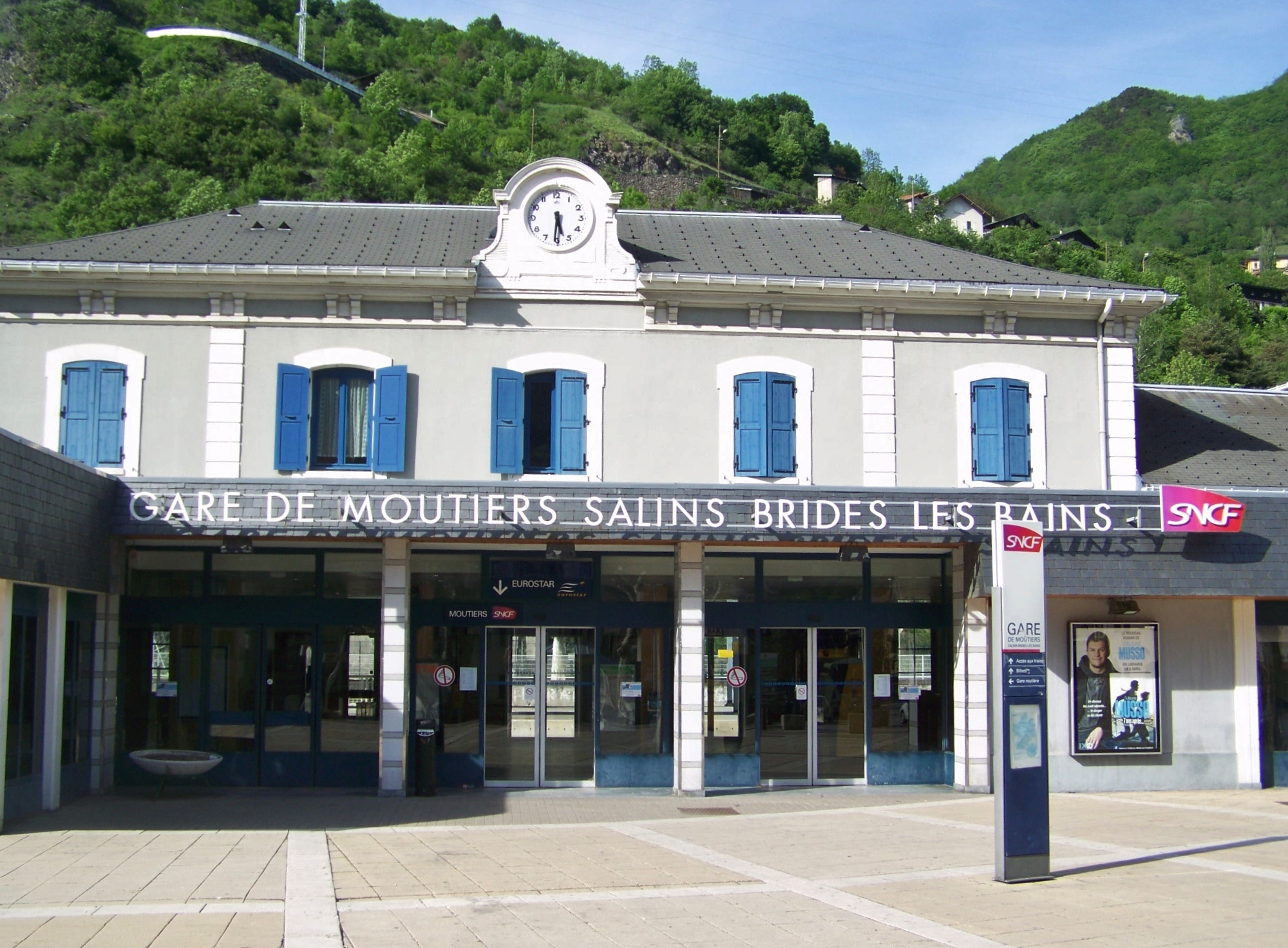
- Moûtiers-Salins-Brides-les-Bains station entrance

General information
- Location: Moûtiers, Savoie, Auvergne-Rhône-Alpes, France
- Coordinates: 45°29′11″N 6°31′53″E
- Line: Saint-Pierre-d'Albigny - Bourg-Saint-Maurice railway
- Platforms: 2
- Tracks: 2

Other information
- Station code: 87741728

Services
Preceding station	TER Auvergne-Rhône-Alpes	Following station
Notre-Dame-de-Briançon towards Chambéry	52	Aime-La Plagne towards Bourg-Saint-Maurice
Preceding station	SNCF	Following station
Albertville towards Paris-Lyon	TGV	Aime-La Plagne towards Bourg-Saint-Maurice
Preceding station	Ouigo	Following station
Albertville towards Paris-Lyon	Grande Vitesse	Aime-La Plagne towards Bourg-Saint-Maurice
Preceding station	Eurostar	Following station
Albertville towards Amsterdam Centraal	Eurostar (winter)	Aime-La Plagne towards Bourg-Saint-Maurice
Location

Moûtiers–Salins–Brides-les-Bains station is a railway station in the Savoie department of Southeastern France. The station, which is located in the town of Moûtiers, is served by two major high-speed services: the TGV and Eurostar.

It is the principal gateway point for the Les Trois Vallées ski resorts if travelling by train. Passengers alight at this station and catch the frequent bus services to the various Les Trois Vallées resorts.

Juxtaposed controls were in operation in the station for Eurostar passengers travelling to the UK. They cleared exit checks from the Schengen Area (carried out by Customs officers) as well as UK entry checks (conducted by the UK Border Force) in the station before boarding their train.

== Services ==
- High speed services (TGV) Paris - Chambéry - Albertville - Bourg-Saint-Maurice
- Local services (TER Auvergne-Rhône-Alpes) (Lyon -) Chambéry - St-Pierre-d'Albigny - Albertville - Bourg-Saint-Maurice

These services operate during the winter ski season:

- High speed services (Eurostar) London - Bourg-Saint-Maurice
- High speed services (Thalys) Amsterdam - Brussels - Chambéry - Bourg-Saint-Maurice

== See also ==
- List of border crossing points in France
- France–UK border
