= Grésy-sur-Isère =

- Commune
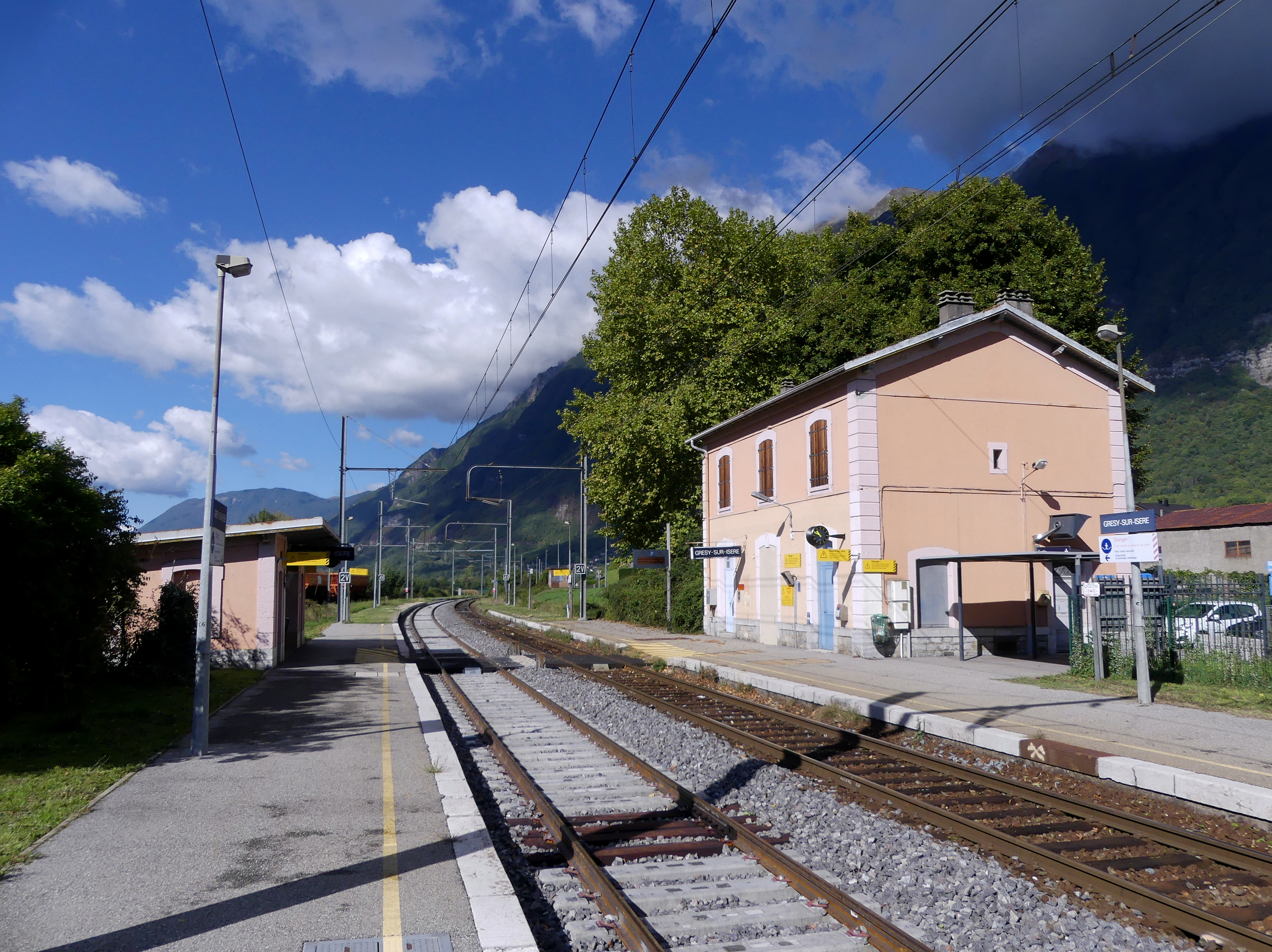
- Grésy-sur-Isère station

- Coat of arms
- Location of Grésy-sur-Isère
- Location within France Location within Auvergne-Rhône-Alpes
- Coordinates: 45°36′06″N 6°15′16″E
- Country: France
- Region: Auvergne-Rhône-Alpes
- Department: Savoie
- Arrondissement: Albertville
- Canton: Albertville-2
- Intercommunality: CA Arlysère

Government
  - Mayor (2020–2026): François Gaudin
- Area^{1}: 9.02 km^{2} (3.48 sq mi)
- Highest elevation: 2,071 m (6,795 ft)
- Lowest elevation: 292 m (958 ft)
- Population (2023): 1,195
  - Density: 132/km^{2} (343/sq mi)
- Time zone: UTC+01:00 (CET)
  - Summer (DST): UTC+02:00 (CEST)
- INSEE/Postal code: 73129 /73460
- Website: www.gresy-sur-isere.com
- ^{1} French Land Register data, which excludes lakes, ponds, glaciers > 1 km^{2} (0.386 sq mi or 247 acres) and river estuaries.

Grésy-sur-Isère (French pronunciation: [ɡʁezi syʁ izɛʁ]; lit. 'Grésy-on-Isère') is a commune in the Savoie department in the Auvergne-Rhône-Alpes region in Southeastern France.

== Transport ==
Grésy-sur-Isère is served by Grésy-sur-Isère station on the Saint-Pierre-d'Albigny–Bourg-Saint-Maurice railway.

== See also ==
- Communes of the Savoie department
