= Landry station =

Railway station in Landry, Savoie, France

Landry
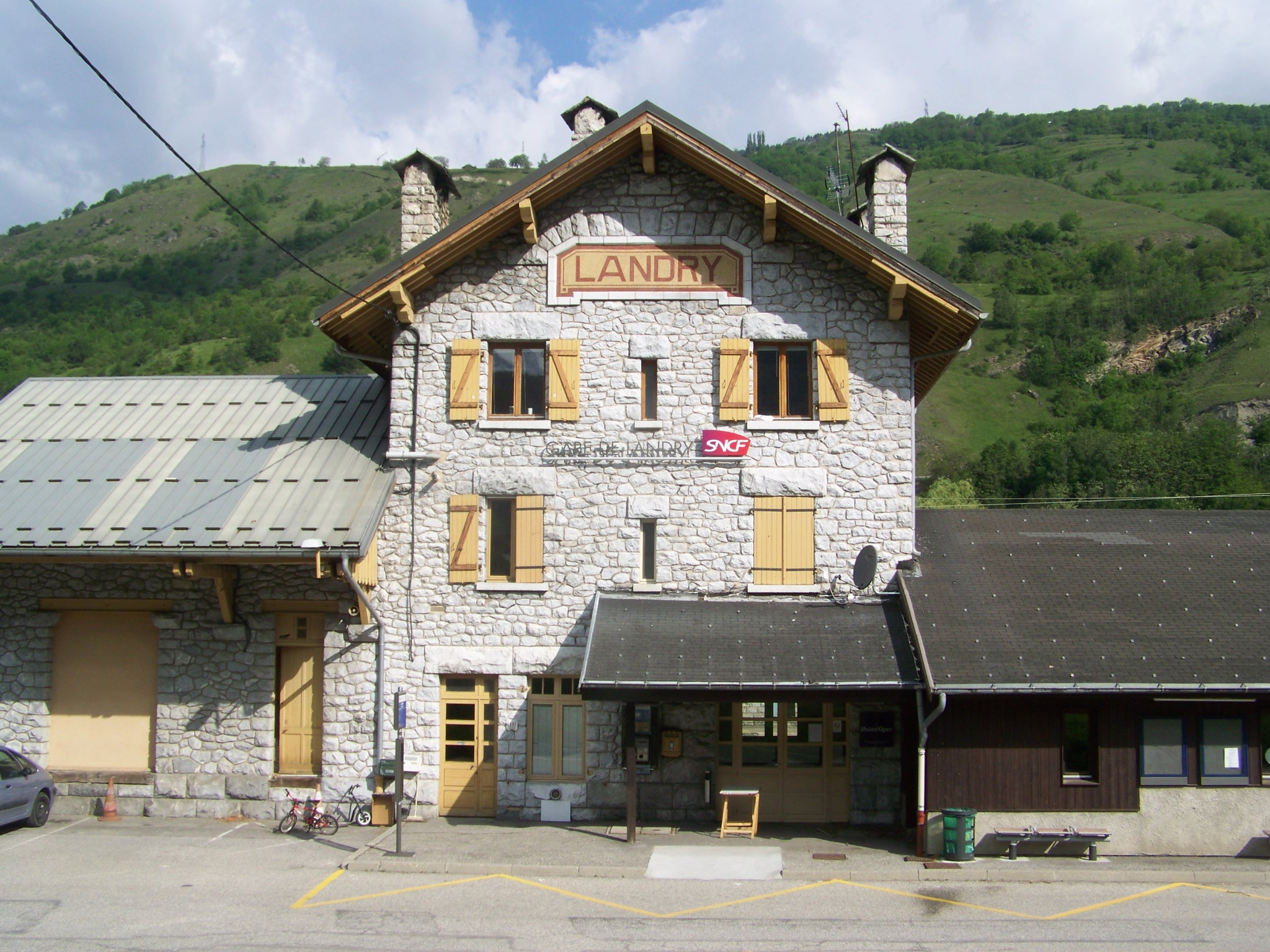
- Landry station

General information
- Location: Place de la Gare; 73210 Landry; Savoie; France
- Coordinates: 45°34′30″N 6°44′08″E
- Owner: SNCF
- Operator: SNCF
- Line: Saint-Pierre-d'Albigny - Bourg-Saint-Maurice railway
- Platforms: 2
- Tracks: 2

Other information
- Station code: 87741777

Passengers
- 2022: 43,236

Services
Preceding station	TER Auvergne-Rhône-Alpes	Following station
Aime-La Plagne towards Chambéry	52	Bourg-Saint-Maurice Terminus
Preceding station	SNCF	Following station
Aime-La Plagne towards Paris-Lyon	TGV	Bourg-Saint-Maurice Terminus
Preceding station	Eurostar	Following station
Aime-La Plagne towards Amsterdam Centraal	Eurostar (winter)	Bourg-Saint-Maurice Terminus
Location

Gare de Landry is a railway station located in Landry, Savoie, south-eastern France. The station is located on the Saint-Pierre-d'Albigny - Bourg-Saint-Maurice railway. The train services are operated by SNCF. It serves the village of Landry and neighbouring ski resorts of Peisey-Vallandry and Montchavin-les Coches. The station is served by TGV and Eurostar high speed services, as well as local TER Auvergne-Rhône-Alpes services.

== Services ==
- High speed services (TGV) Paris - Chambéry - Albertville - Bourg-Saint-Maurice
- Local services (TER Auvergne-Rhône-Alpes) (Lyon -) Chambéry - St-Pierre-d'Albigny - Albertville - Bourg-Saint-Maurice

These services operate during the winter ski season:

- High speed services (Eurostar) Amsterdam/Lille - Brussels - Chambéry - Bourg-Saint-Maurice
