= Bourg-Saint-Maurice station =

Railway station in Bourg-Saint-Maurice, France

Bourg-Saint-Maurice
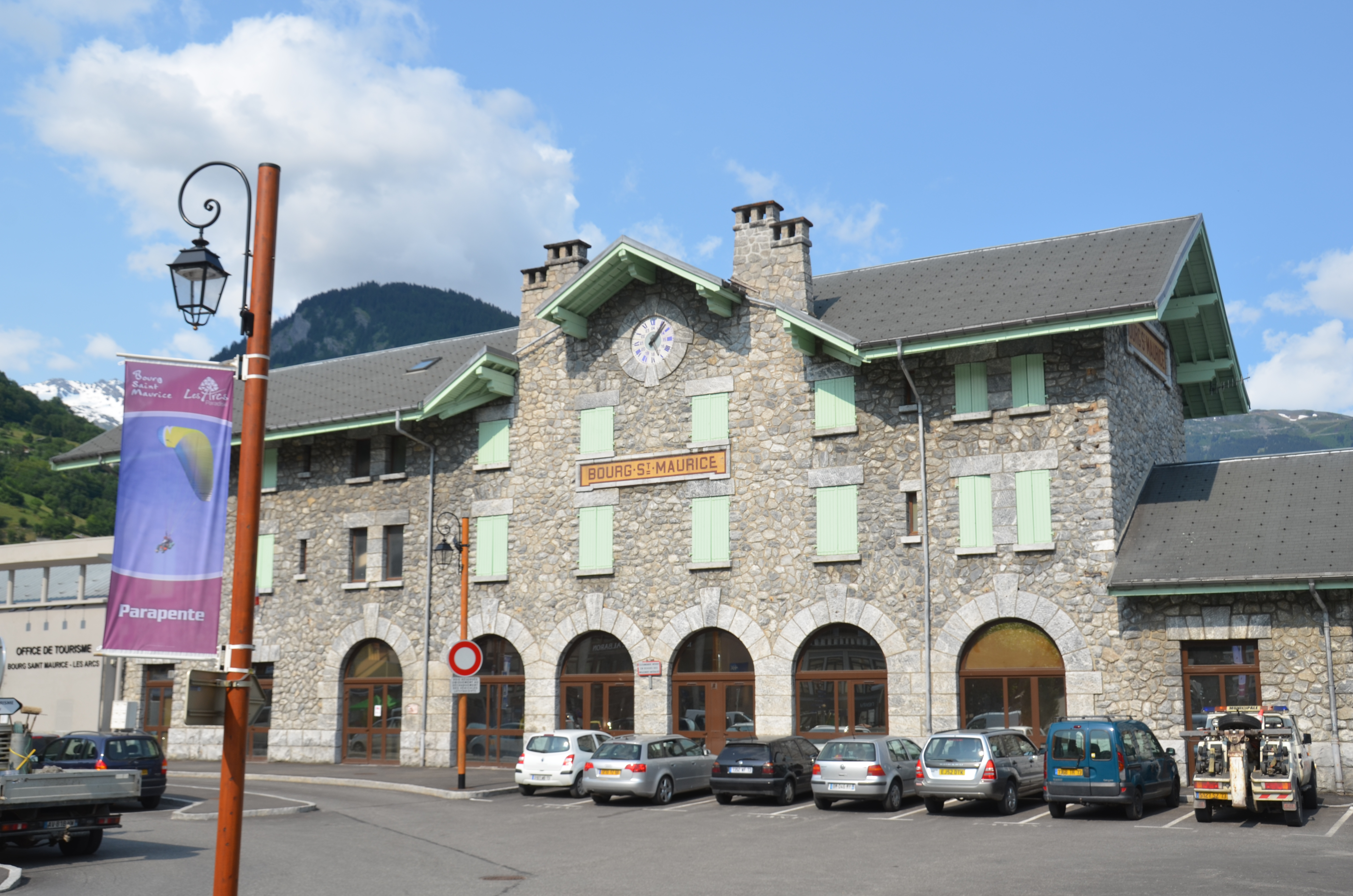
- Bourg-Saint-Maurice station building

General information
- Location: Bourg-Saint-Maurice, Savoie; France
- Coordinates: 45°37′05″N 6°46′18″E
- Line: Saint-Pierre-d'Albigny–Bourg-Saint-Maurice railway
- Platforms: 3 island platforms
- Tracks: 15 (6 at platforms)

Construction
- Structure type: At-grade

Other information
- Station code: 87741793

History
- Opened: 20 November 1913
Services
| Preceding station | TER Auvergne-Rhône-Alpes | Following station |
|---|---|---|
| Landry towards Chambéry | 52 | Terminus |
| Preceding station | Ouigo | Following station |
| Aime-La Plagne towards Paris-Lyon | Grande Vitesse | Terminus |
| Preceding station | SNCF | Following station |
| Landry towards Paris-Lyon | TGV inOui | Terminus |
| Preceding station | Eurostar | Following station |
| Landry towards Amsterdam Centraal | Eurostar (winter) | Terminus |
Location

Bourg-Saint-Maurice station (French: Gare de Bourg-Saint-Maurice, [ɡaʁ d(ə) buʁ sɛ̃ mɔʁis]) is a railway station in Bourg-Saint-Maurice, Auvergne-Rhône-Alpes in southeast France.

The station is located at the end of the Saint-Pierre-d'Albigny–Bourg-Saint-Maurice railway. The station is served by TGV (high-speed long-distance) and TER (regional) services operated by the SNCF. During the winter months Eurostar services from Amsterdam, Brussels and Lille travel to Bourg-Saint-Maurice. The station was heavily rebuilt for the 1992 Winter Olympics in Albertville. The station also features some sidings to store passenger trains when not in use.

Juxtaposed controls are in fitted in the station for Eurostar passengers travelling to the United Kingdom (a routing not currently in service). Passengers clear Schengen Area exit checks (carried out by Customs officers) as well as UK immigration entry checks (conducted by the UK Border Force) in the station before boarding their train on a secure, gated platform.

Located beside the main railway station is the terminus station for the Arc en Ciel funicular railway, which links the town to the Arc 1600 ski area.

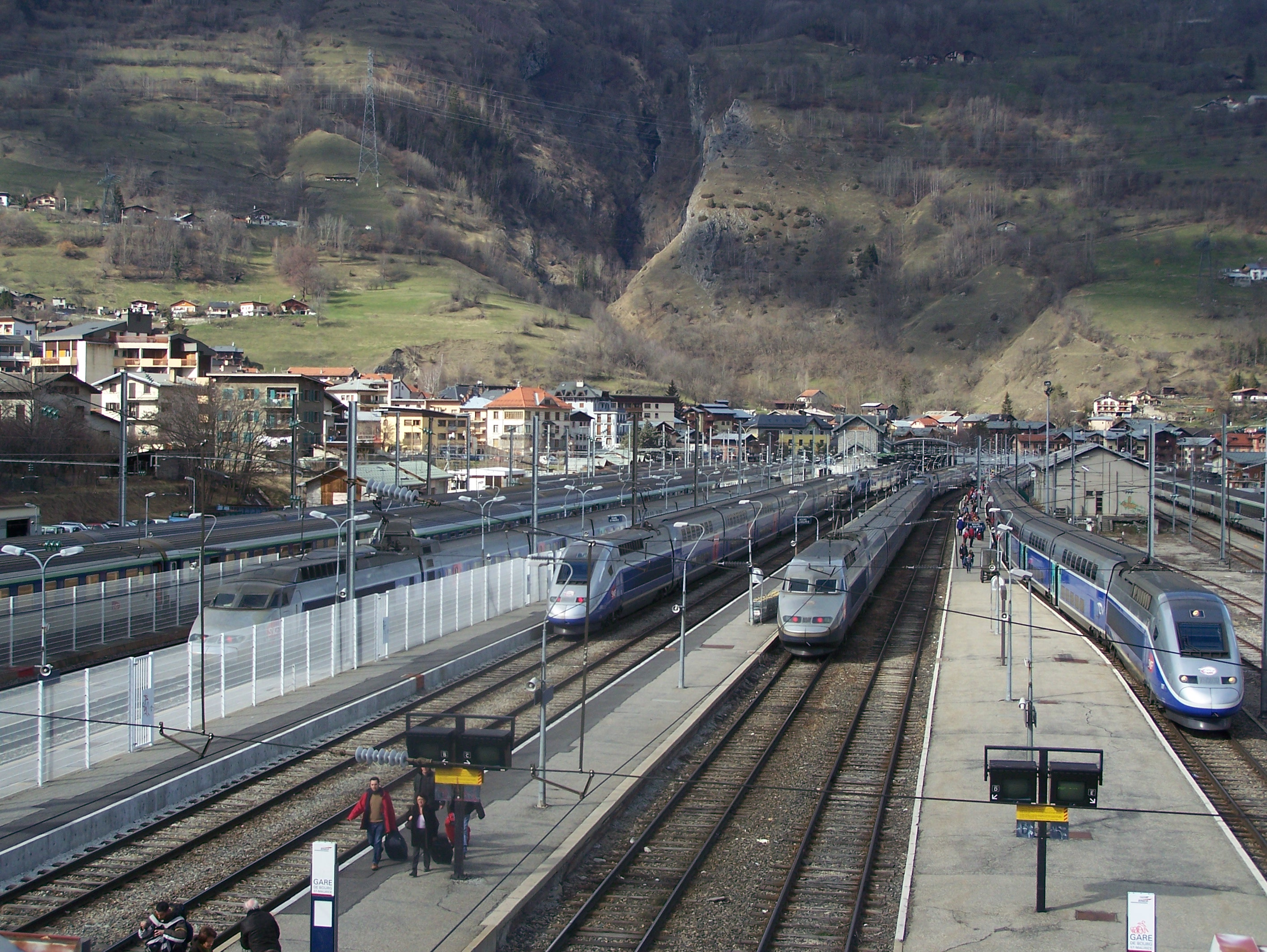
TGVs stationed

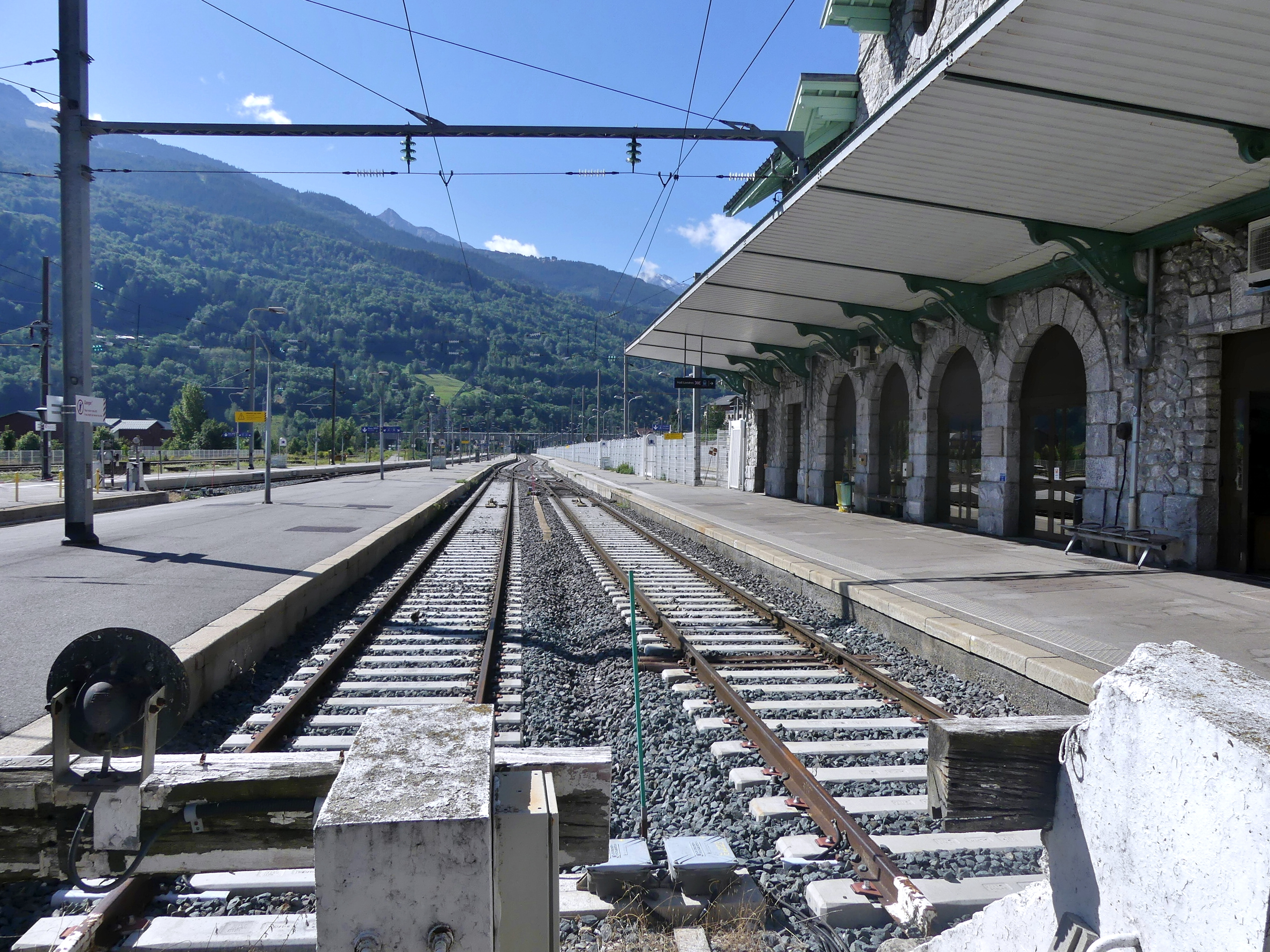
Platforms view

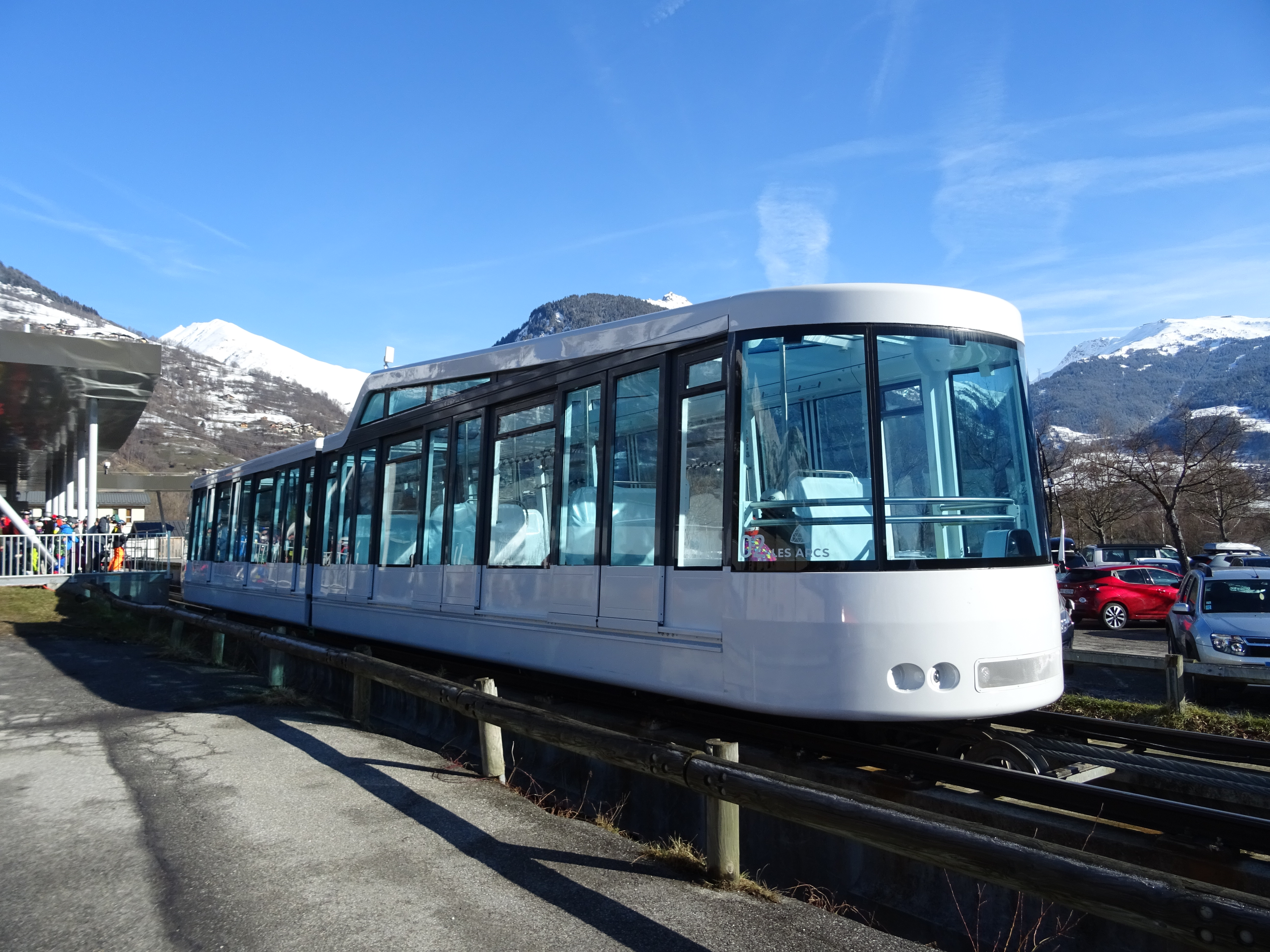
Funicular cabin arriving at Bourg-Saint-Maurice station.

== Train services ==
The following services currently call at Bourg-Saint-Maurice:

| Series | Train Type | Route | Notes |
|---|---|---|---|
| Auvergne-Rhône-Alpes 52 | Regional | Chambéry-Challes-les-Eaux – Montmélian – Saint-Pierre-d'Albigny – Grésy-sur-Isère – Frontenex – Albertville – Notre-Dame-de-Briançon – Moûtiers-Salins-Brides-les-Bains – Aime-La Plagne – Landry – Bourg-Saint-Maurice | Daily |
| TGV inOui | High-speed | Paris-Gare de Lyon – Chambéry-Challes-les-Eaux – Albertville – Moûtiers – Salins – Brides-les-Bains – Aime-La Plagne – Landry – Bourg-Saint-Maurice | Weekends & Holidays |
| Ouigo | High-speed | Paris-Gare de Lyon – Lyon-Saint-Exupéry – Grenoble – Albertville – Moûtiers-Salins-Brides-les-Bains – Aime-La Plagne – Bourg-Saint-Maurice | Seasonal |
| Eurostar | International high-speed | Amsterdam – Schiphol Airport – Rotterdam – Antwerp – Brussels – Chambéry – Albertville – Moûtiers-Salins-Brides-les-Bains – Aime-La Plagne – Landry – Bourg-Saint-Maurice | Once weekly, Saturdays (Winter) |

== See also ==
- List of border crossing points in France
