= Montluel station =

Railway station in Montluel, France

Montluel
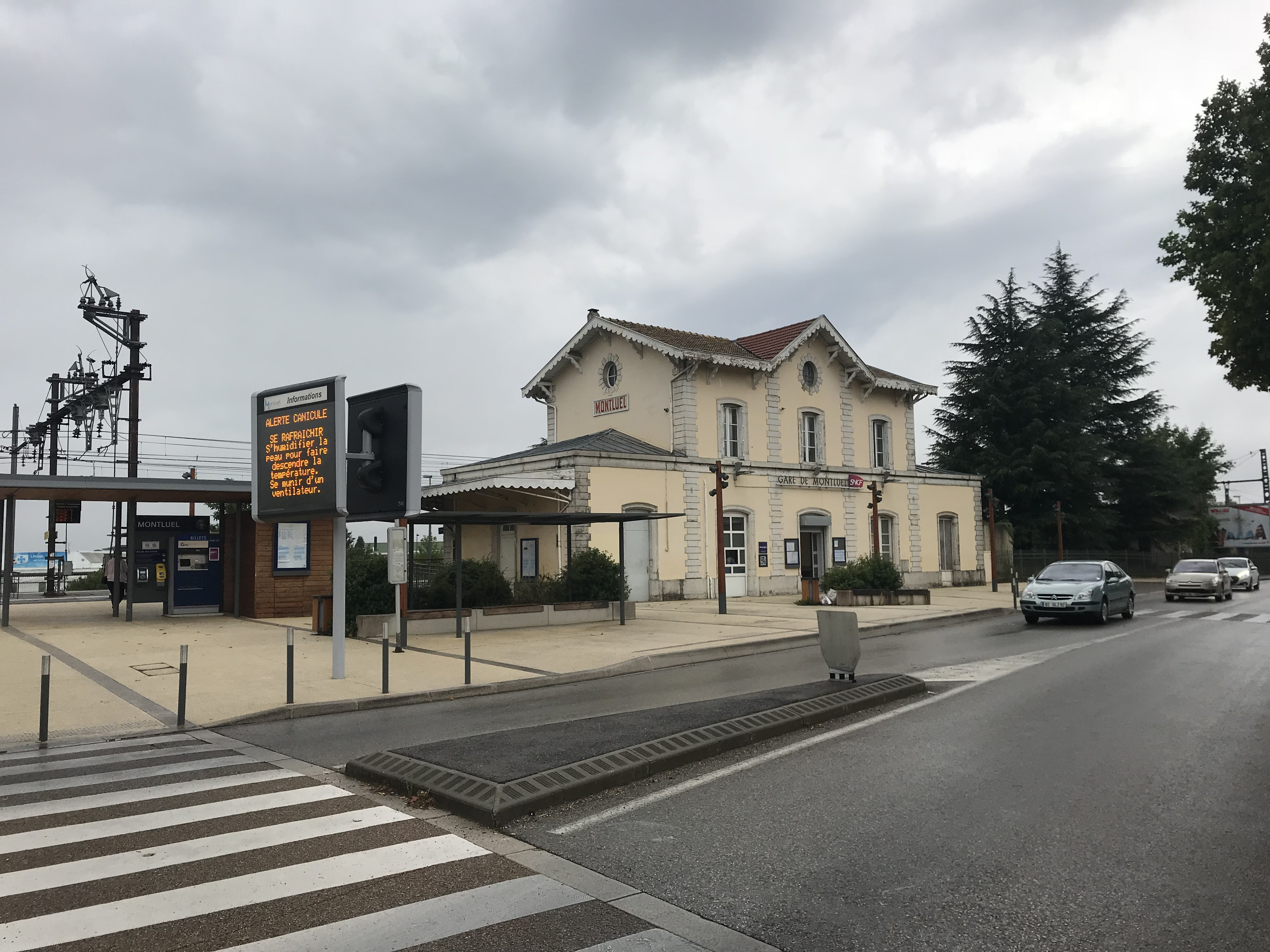
- Passenger building and station entrance

General information
- Location: Place de la Gare; 01120 Montluel; Ain; France
- Coordinates: 45°50′52″N 5°03′27″E
- Elevation: 198 metres (650 ft)
- Owner: SNCF
- Operator: SNCF
- Line: Lyon–Geneva railway
- Distance: 25.195 km
- Platforms: 2
- Tracks: 3 + service tracks
- Train operators: TER Auvergne-Rhône-Alpes

Other information
- Station code: 87723569

History
- Opened: 23 June 1856

Passengers
- 2019: 509,568

Services
Preceding station	TER Auvergne-Rhône-Alpes	Following station
Beynost towards Lyon-Part-Dieu	35	La Valbonne towards Chambéry
Location

Montluel station (French: Gare de Montluel) is a French railway station located in the commune of Montluel, Ain department in the Auvergne-Rhône-Alpes region. Established at an elevation of 198 meters, the station is located at kilometric point (KP) 25.195 on the Lyon–Geneva railway, between the stations of La Boisse and La Valbonne.

As of 2022, the station is owned and operated by the SNCF and served by TER Auvergne-Rhône-Alpes trains.

== History ==
The section of railway between Lyon and Ambérieu opened on 23 June 1856. Initially from Lyon-Saint-Clair station, as the bridge across the Rhône was not yet finished, the line traveled along to the river until the Miribel station and extending until Montluel.

On 7 January 2011, a 16-year old teenager, Antoine Mauresa, was fatally wounded by a TER train at the station. Following the incident, the safety of the station (which had no pedestrian overpass or underpass at the time), was widely called into question. The mayor of Montluel, Jacky Bernard, supported the construction of a separated passage-way. The fully accessible passenger overpass was ultimately completed the year following, in 2012.

In 2019, the SNCF estimated that 509,568 passengers traveled through the station.

== Services ==
=== Passenger services ===
Operated by the SNCF, the station has a passenger building equipped with automatic vending machines for purchasing tickets. Since 2012, a fully accessible passenger overpass has allowed for movement from one platform to another.

Pedestrian overpass

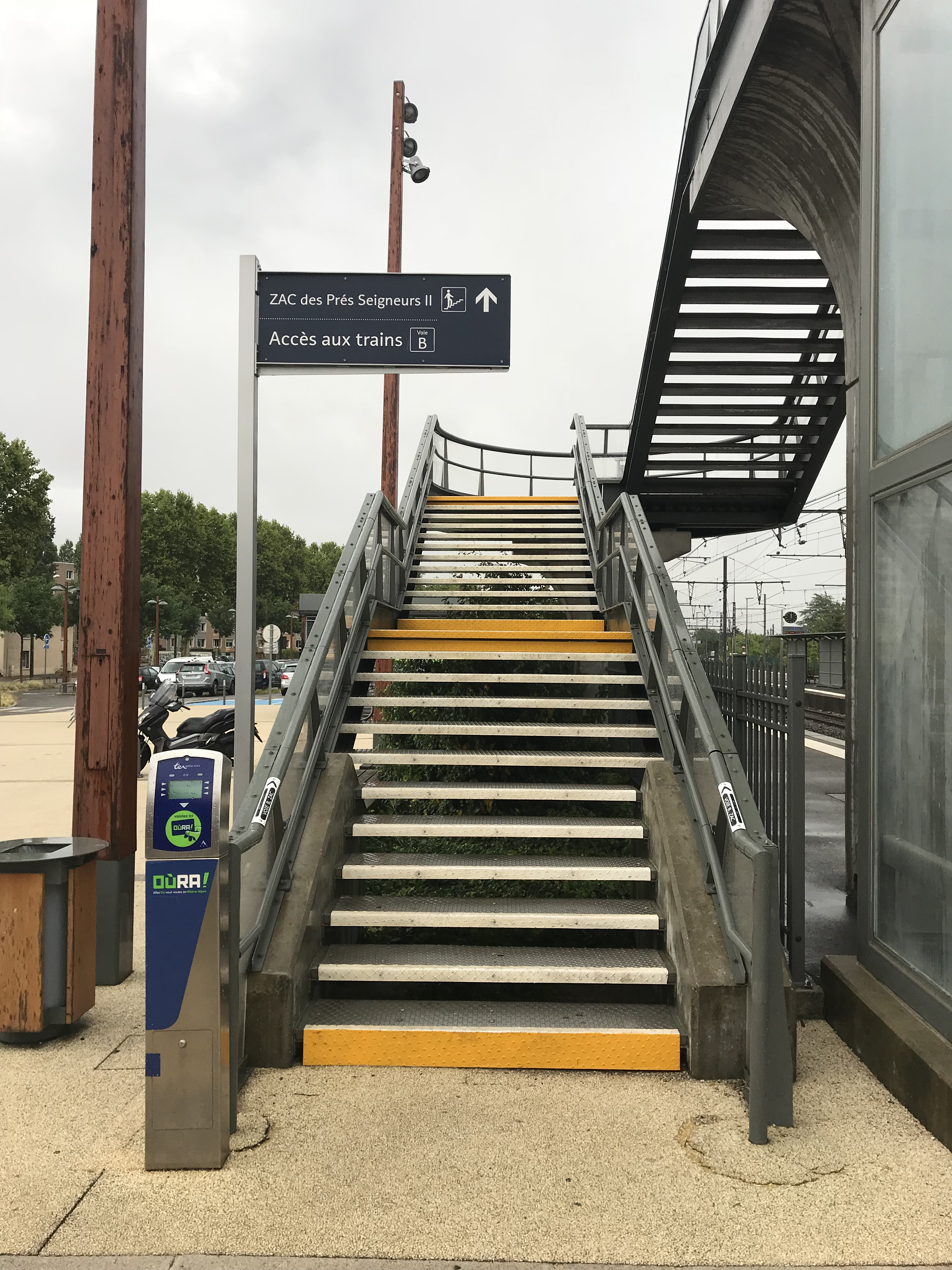

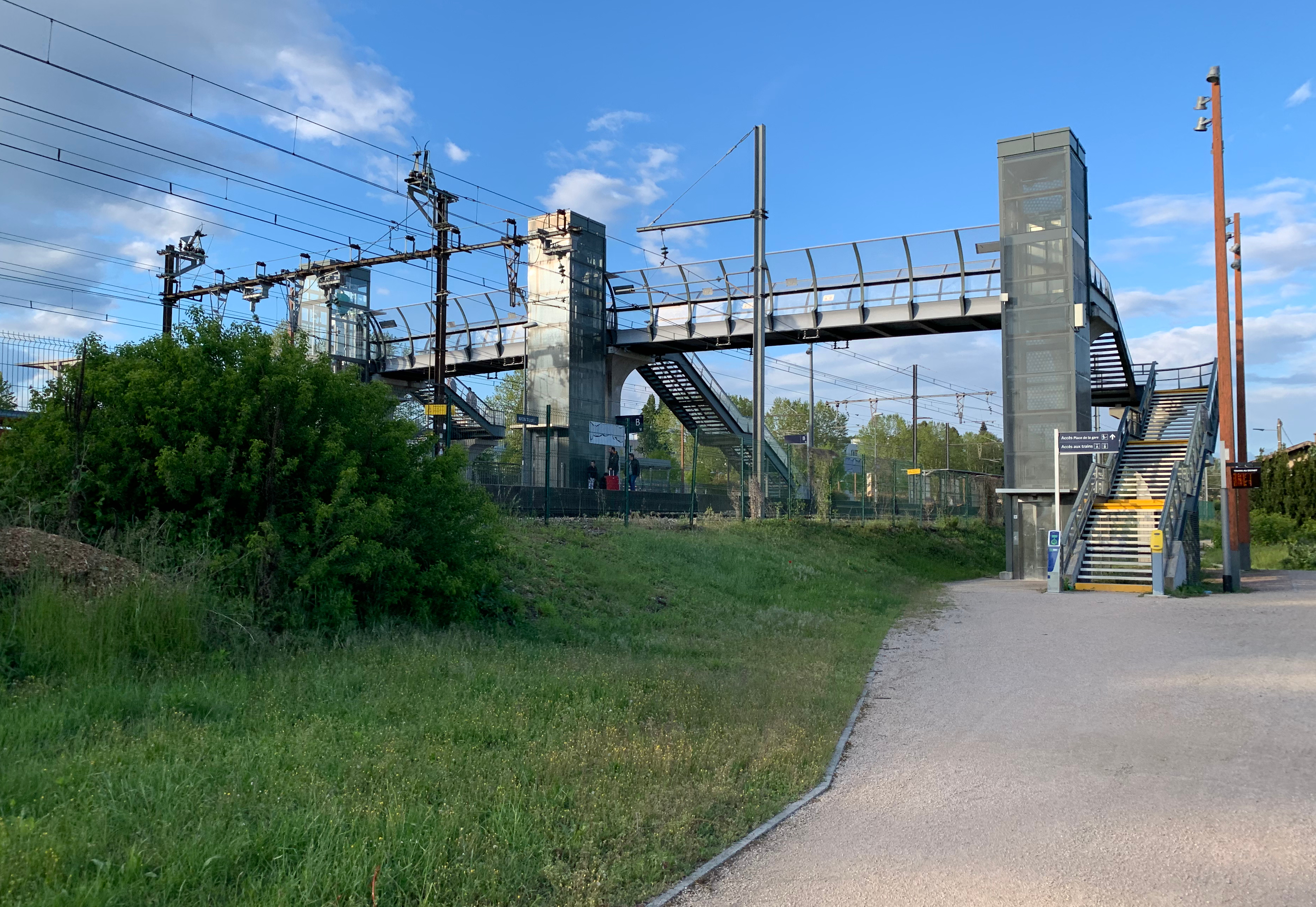

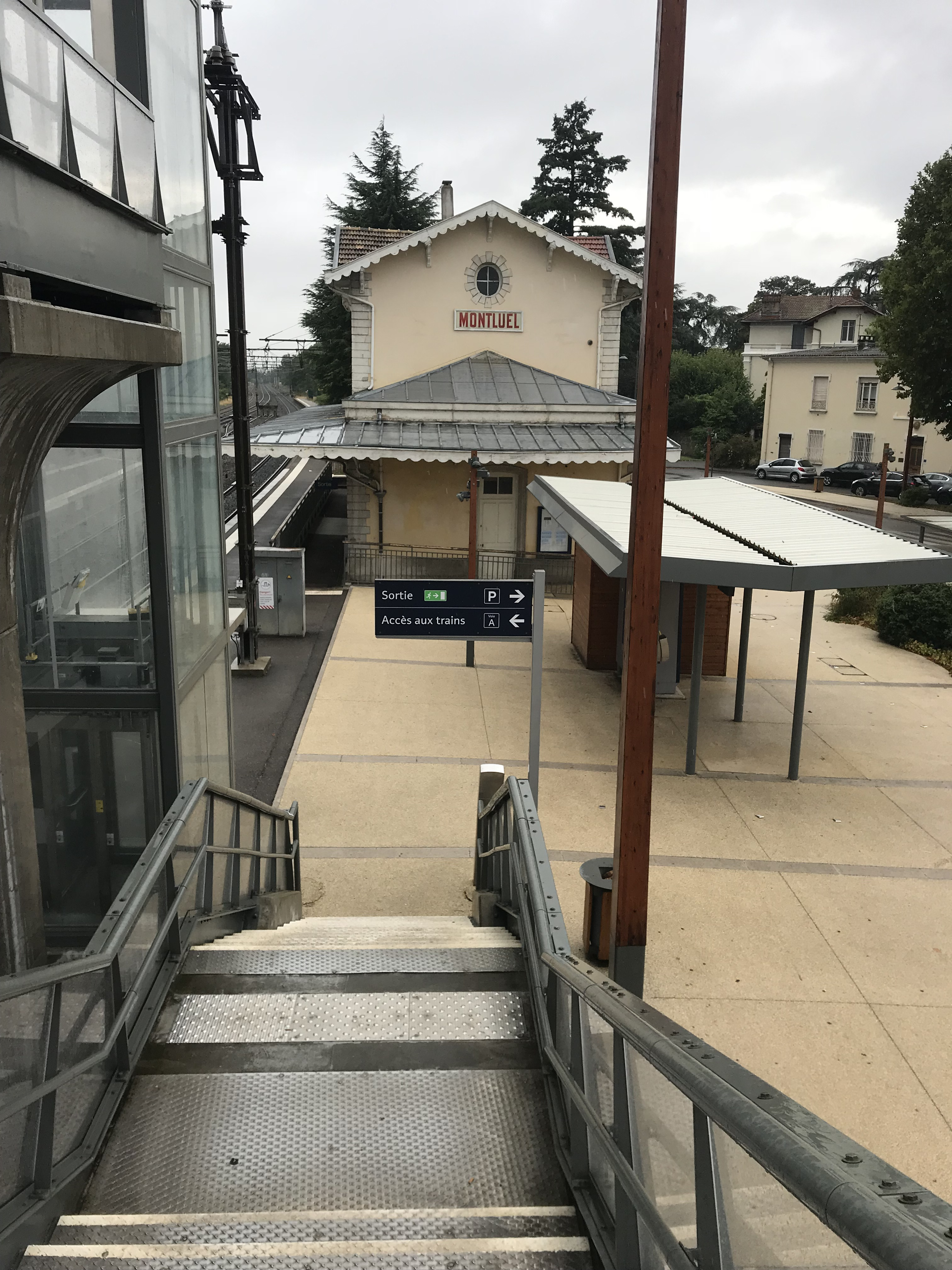

=== Train services ===
Montluel station is served by TER Auvergne-Rhône-Alpes trains running between Lyon-Part-Dieu or Lyon-Perrache and Ambérieu-en-Bugey. Connections are possible from Ambérieu-en-Bugey station towards Culoz, Genève-Cornavin, Évian-les-Bains, Annecy, and Saint-Gervais-les-Bains-Le Fayet.

Infrastructure and train services

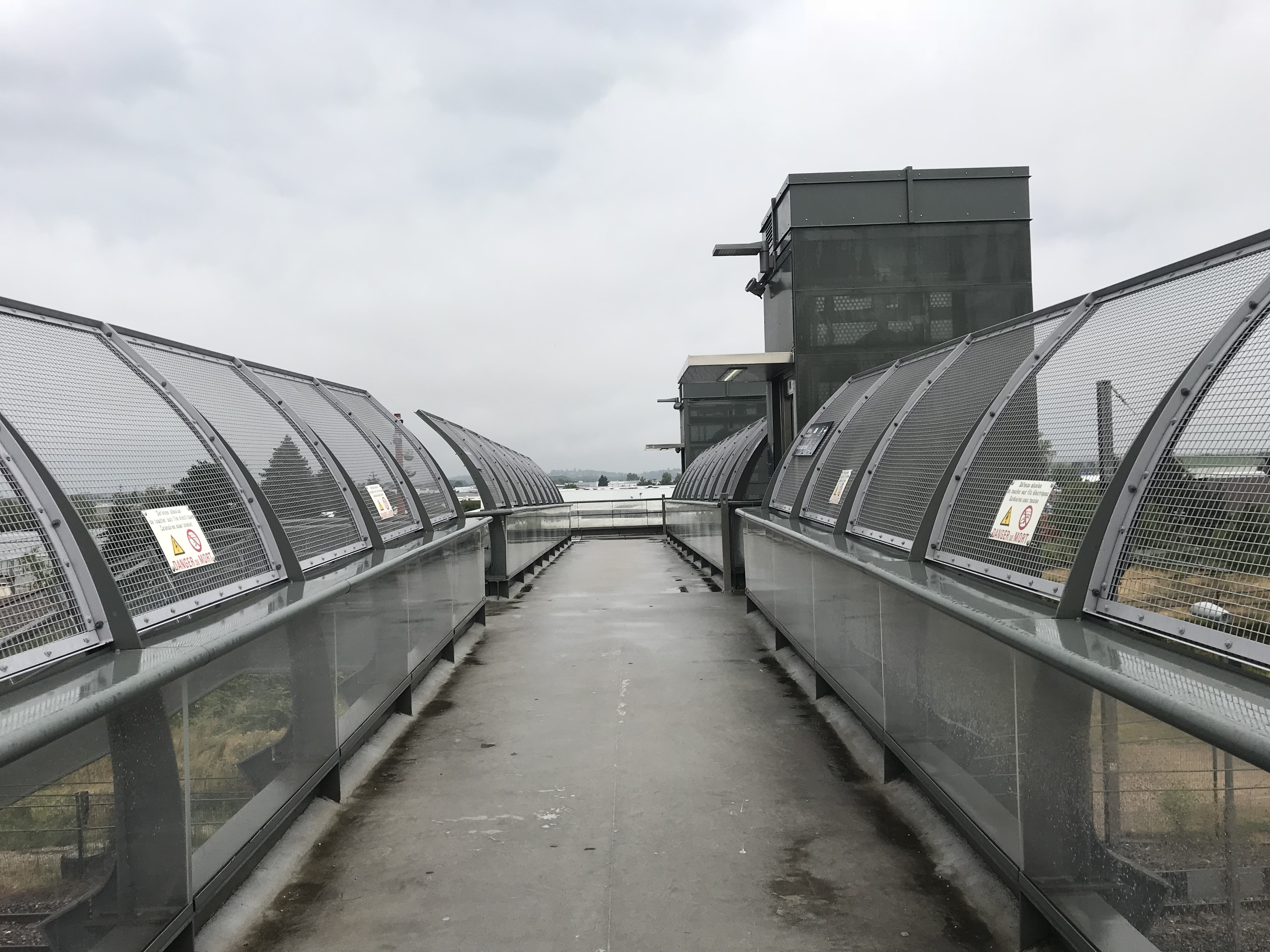
Pedestrian overpass

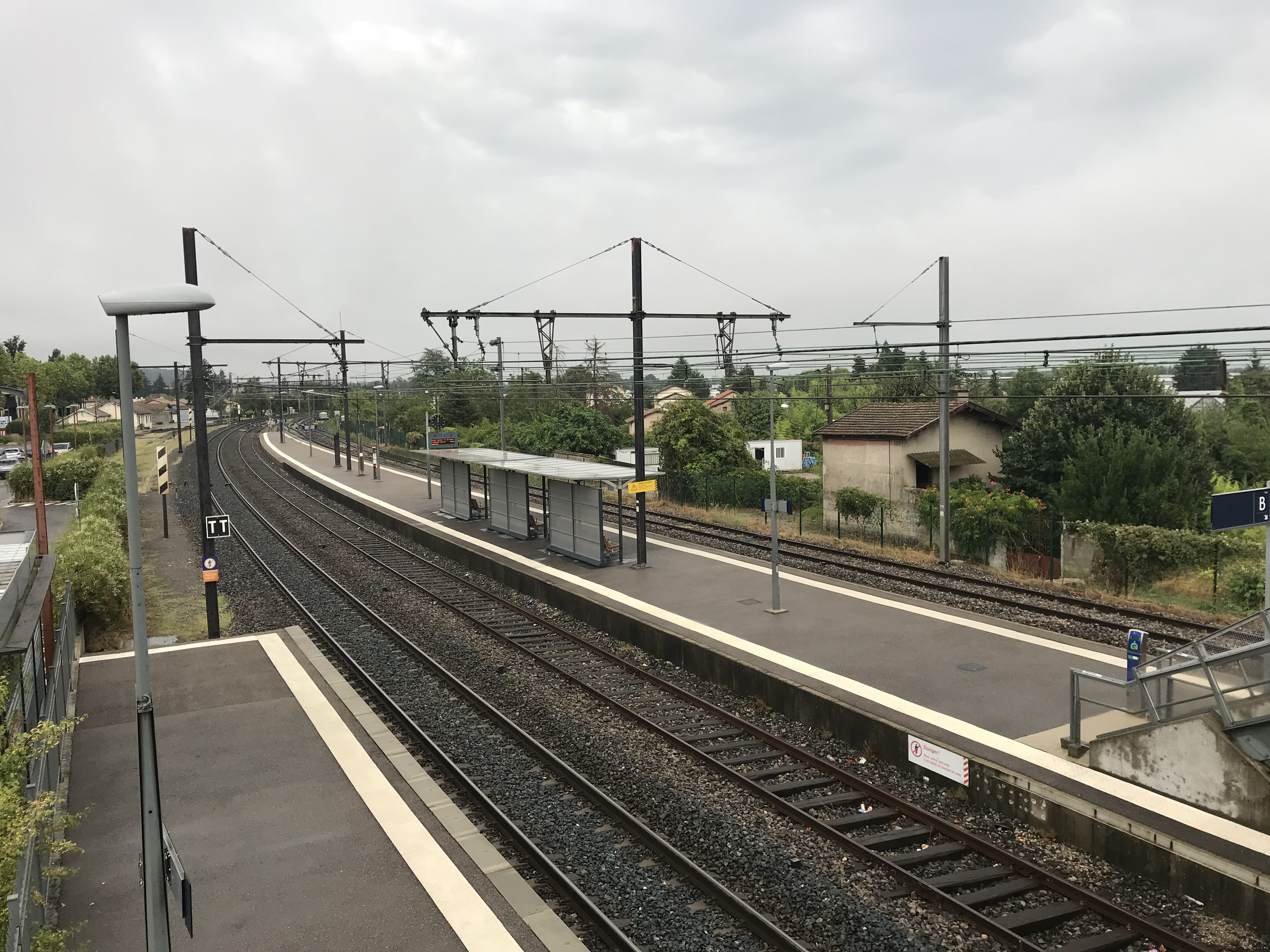
Tracks and platforms.

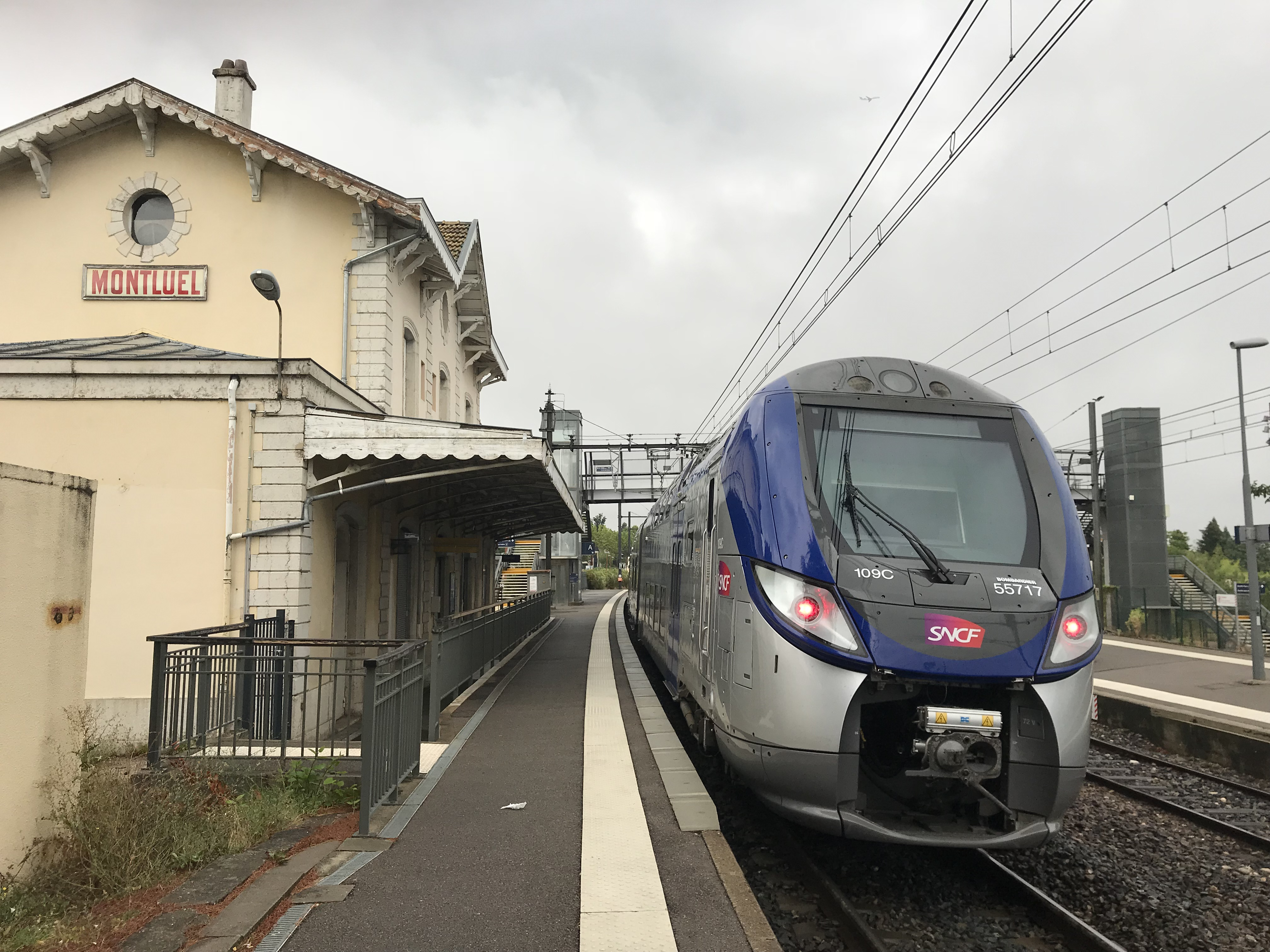
TER Auvergne-Rhône-Alpes train at the platform

=== Intermodality ===
The station is equipped with bicycle storage facilities.

== See also ==
- List of SNCF stations in Auvergne-Rhône-Alpes
