= Beynost station =

Railway station in Beynost, France

Coordinates: 45.8339°N 5.0070°E

Beynost
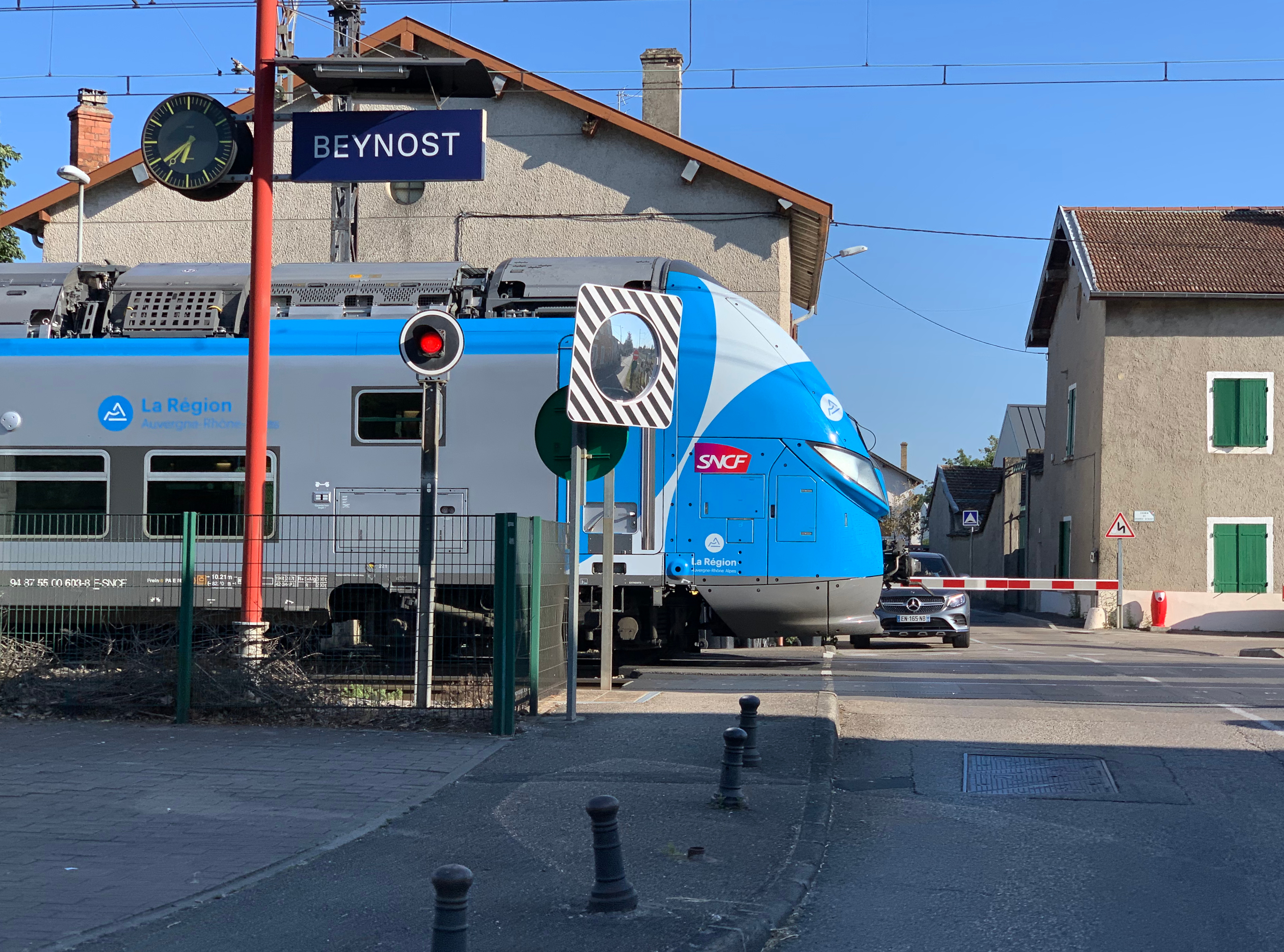
- TER Auvergne-Rhône-Alpes at Beynost

General information
- Location: Route de la Gare; 01700 Beynost; Ain; France
- Elevation: 180 m (590 ft)
- Owner: SNCF
- Operator: SNCF
- Line: Lyon–Geneva railway
- Distance: 20.966 km
- Platforms: 2
- Tracks: 2

History
- Opened: 23 June 1856

Passengers
- 2019: 213,302

Services
Preceding station	TER Auvergne-Rhône-Alpes	Following station
Saint-Maurice-de-Beynost towards Lyon-Part-Dieu	35	Montluel towards Chambéry
Location

Beynost (French pronunciation: [beno]; French: Gare de Beynost) is a French railway station located in commune of Beynost, Ain department in the Auvergne-Rhône-Alpes region. It is located at kilometric point (KP) 20.966 on the Lyon–Geneva railway.

As of 2020, the station is owned and operated by the SNCF and served by TER Auvergne-Rhône-Alpes trains.

== History ==
The Compagnie du chemin de fer de Lyon à Genève opened the station on 23 June 1856, along with a section of railway between Lyon and Ambérieu-en-Bugey, via Miribel.

The station previously consisted of a passenger building, which has since disappeared.

In 2019, the SNCF estimated that 213,302 passengers traveled through the station.

== Services ==
=== Passenger services ===
Classified as a PANG (point d'accès non géré), the station is unstaffed without any passenger services. However the station is equipped with ticket vending machines.

=== Train services ===
As of 2020, Beynost station is served by TER Auvergne-Rhône-Alpes line 35 trains running between Ambérieu and Lyon-Part-Dieu.

=== Intermodality ===
Station installations

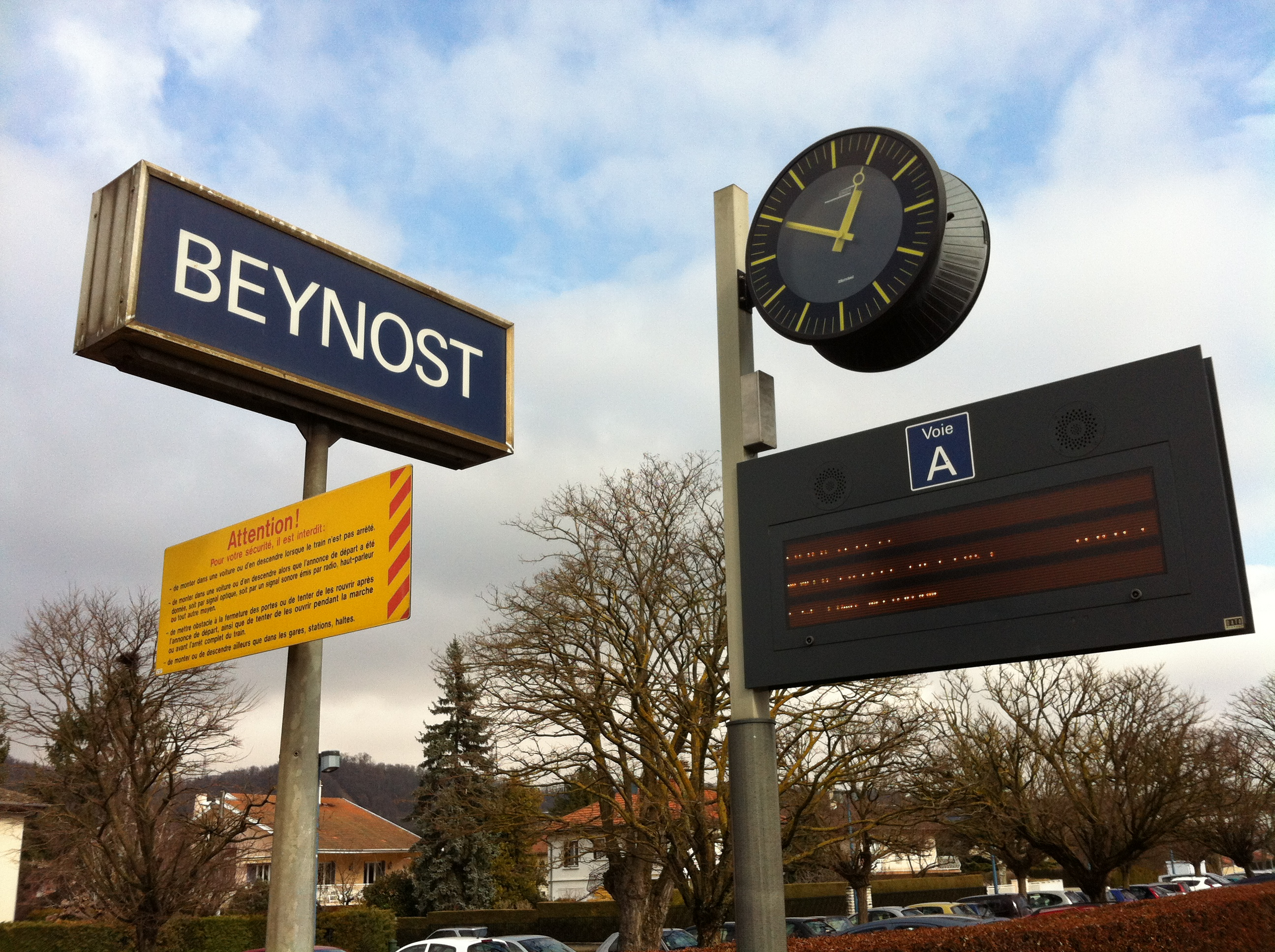

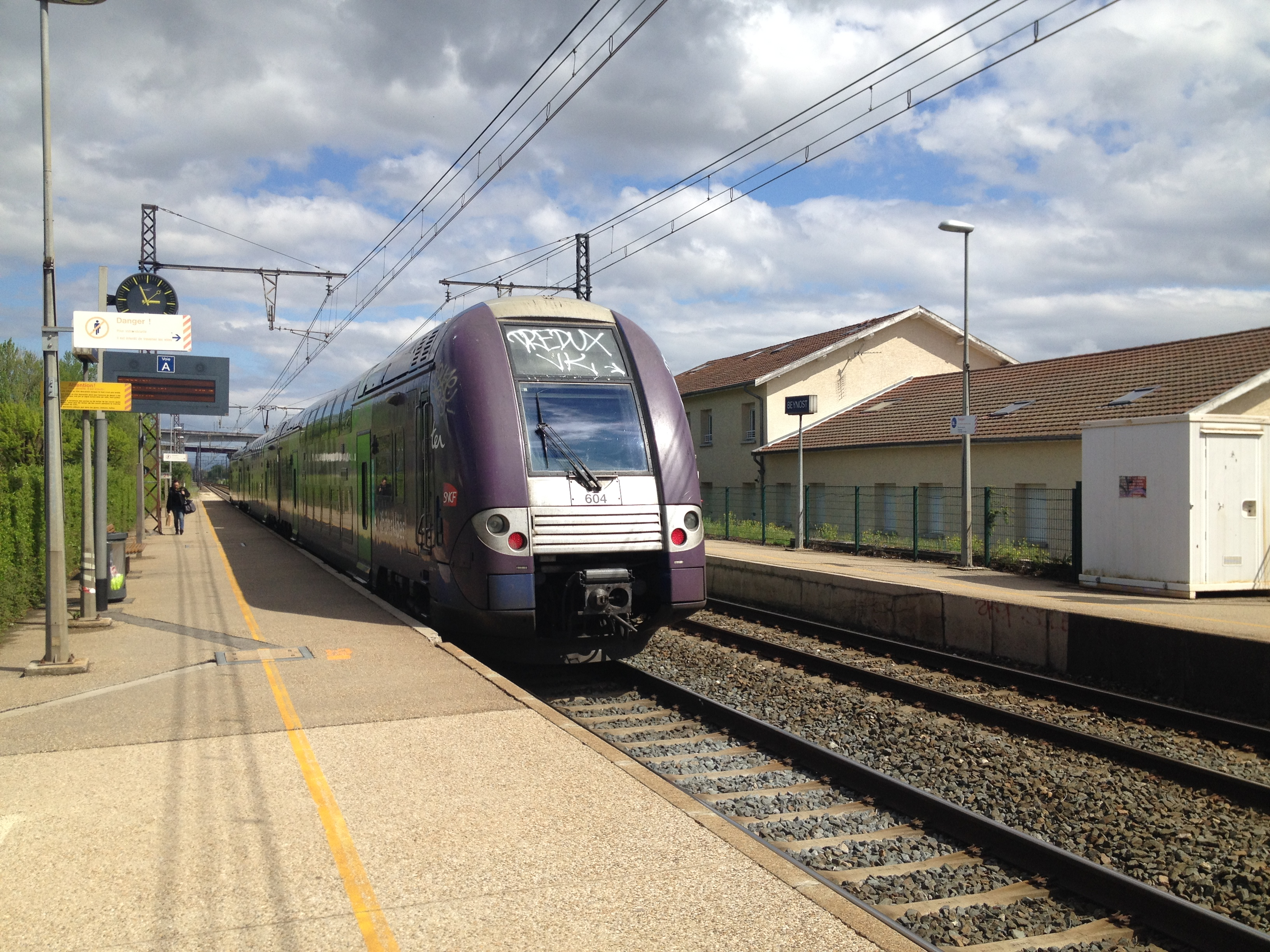

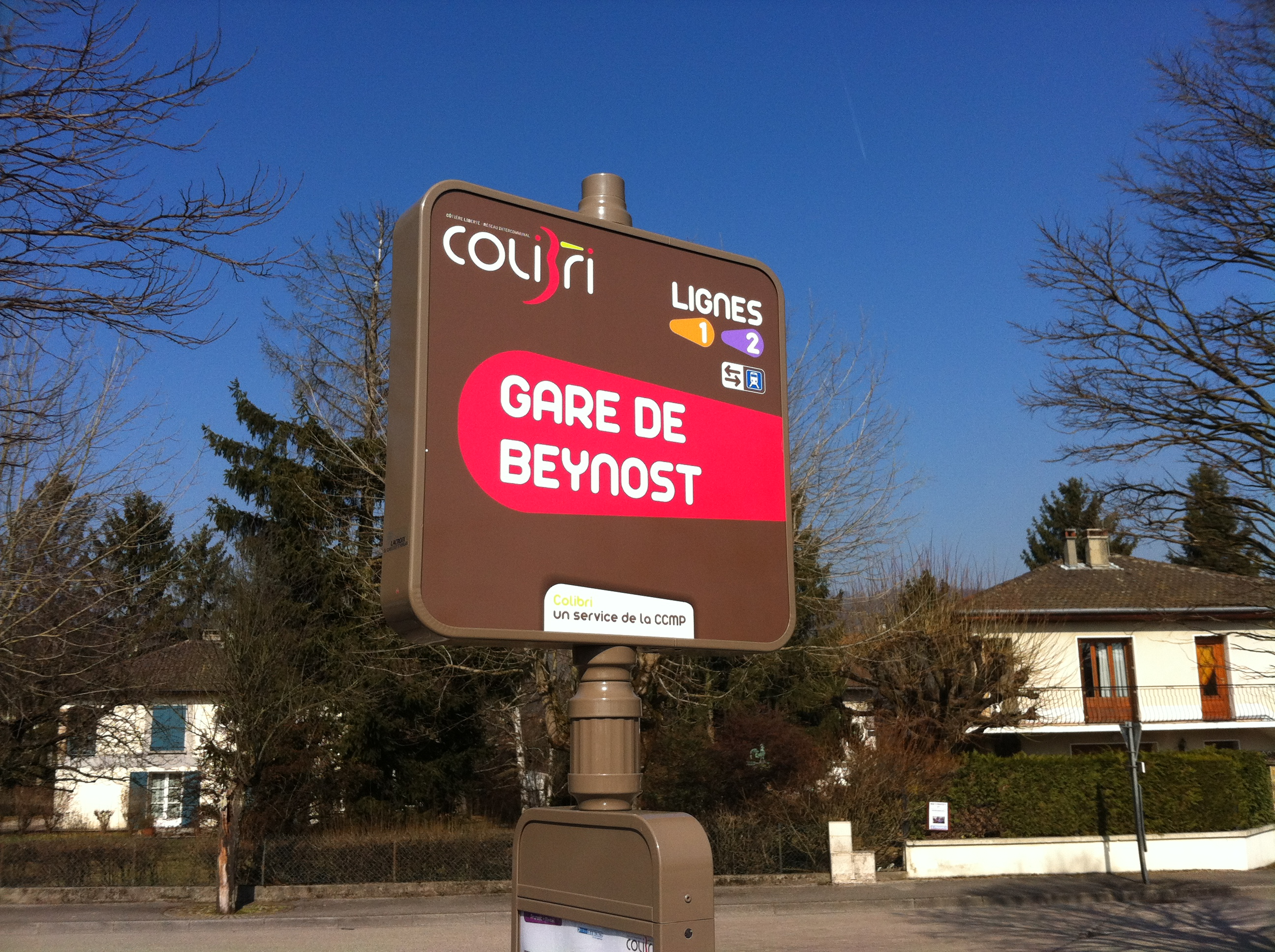
