= La Boisse station =

Railway station in La Boisse, France

La Boisse
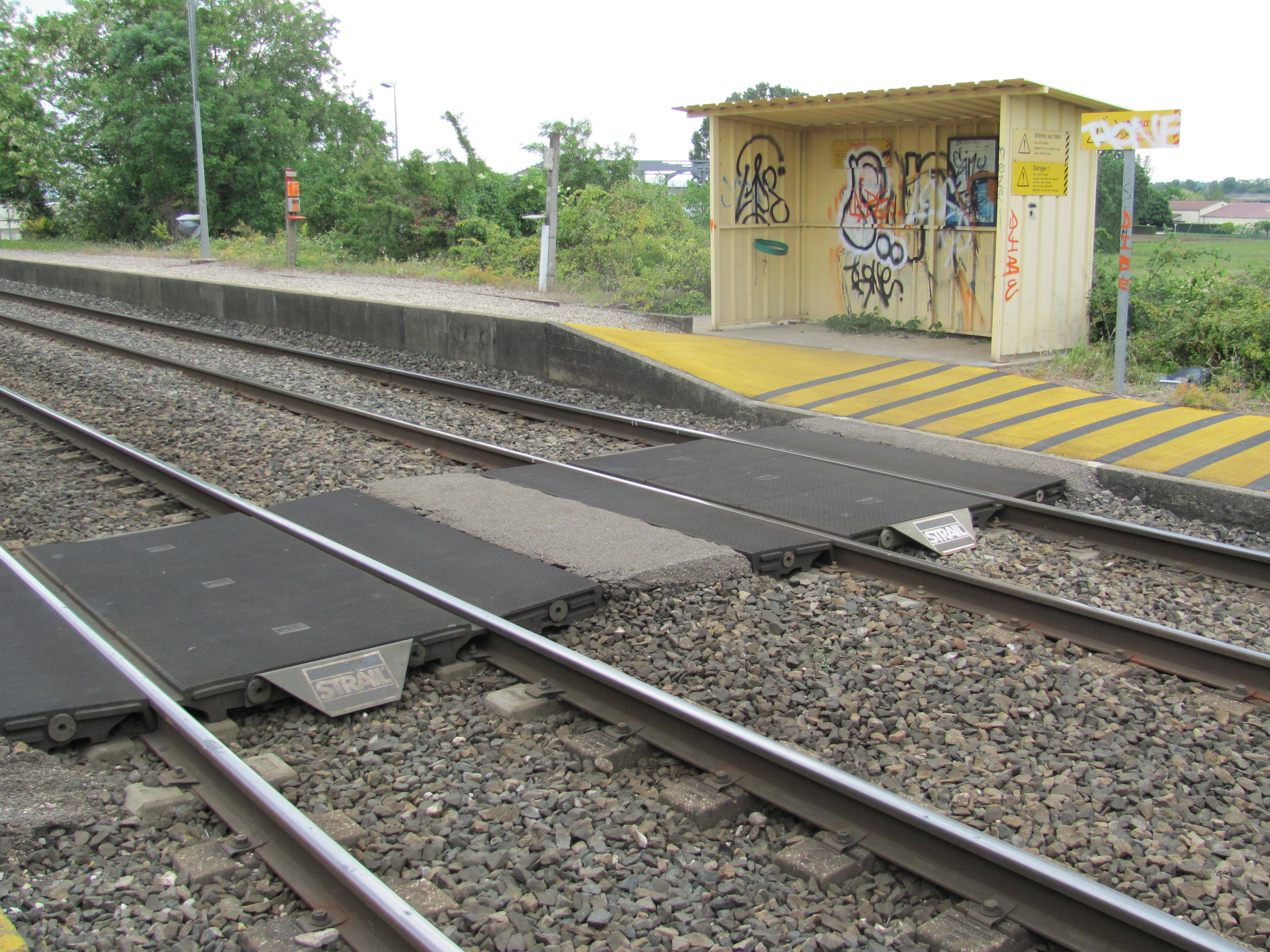

General information
- Location: Impasse de la Gare; 01120 La Boisse; Ain; France
- Owner: SNCF
- Line: Lyon–Geneva railway
- Platforms: 2
- Tracks: 2

History
- Opened: 23 June 1856
Location

La Boisse station (French: Gare de La Boisse) was a French railway station located in commune of La Boisse, Ain department in the Auvergne-Rhône-Alpes region. The station was on the Lyon-Geneva railway.

As of 2020, the station has been closed by the SNCF and lacks any passenger or freight services.

== History ==
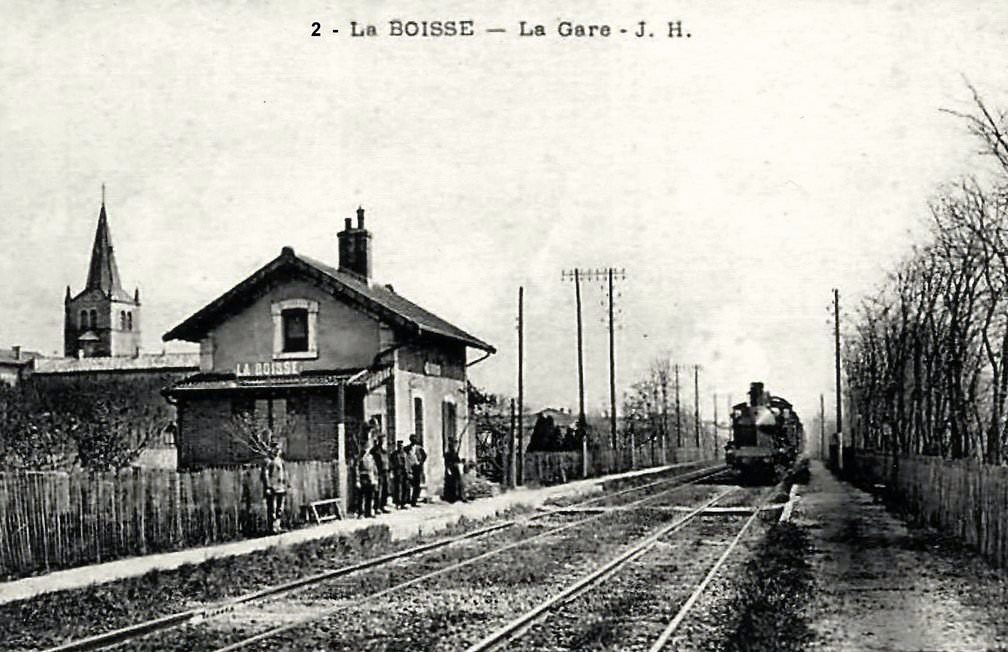
La Boisse station on an early-1900s post-card.

The station was opened along with a section of railway between Lyon-Perrache and Ambérieu, via Saint-Maurice-de-Beynost, on 23 June 1856.

== See also ==
- List of SNCF stations in Auvergne-Rhône-Alpes
