= Cize–Bolozon station =

Railway station in Bolozon, France

Coordinates: 46.2134°N 5.4540°E

Cize–Bolozon
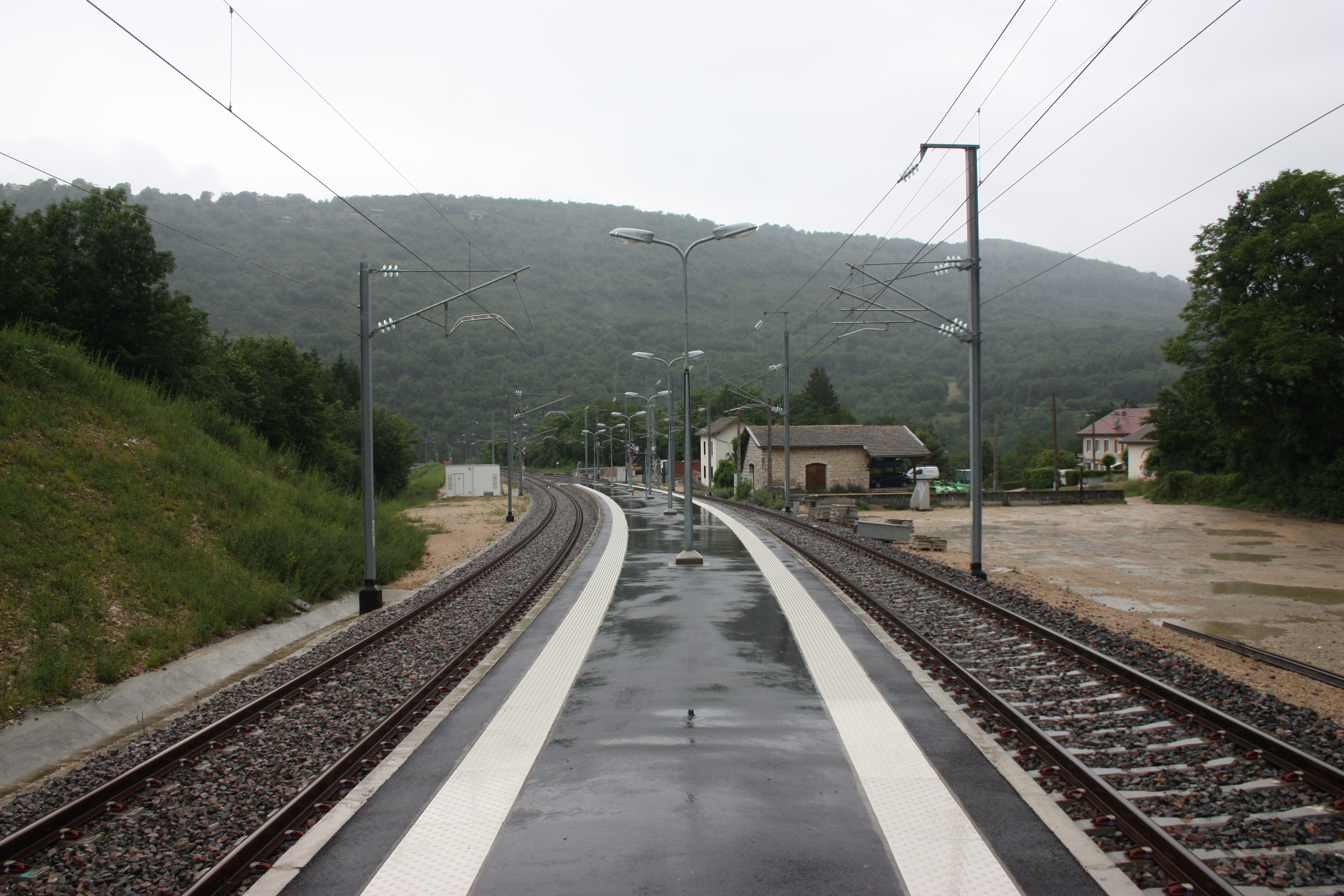
- Cize–Bolozon station in 2010.

General information
- Location: 01450 Bolozon; Ain; France
- Elevation: 318 m (1,043 ft)
- Owner: SNCF
- Operator: SNCF
- Line: Bourg-en-Bresse–Bellegarde railway
- Distance: 25.061 km
- Platforms: 1 (center island)
- Tracks: 2

History
- Opened: 6 July 1876
- Closed: 2005–2010 (for reconstruction)

Passengers
- 2016: 931

Services
Preceding station	TER Auvergne-Rhône-Alpes	Following station
Simandre-sur-Suran towards Bourg-en-Bresse	31	Nurieux towards Oyonnax
Location

Cize–Bolozon station (French: Gare de Cize–Bolozon) is a French railway station located in commune of Bolozon, Ain department in the Auvergne-Rhône-Alpes region. As its name suggests, that station also serves the nearby commune of Cize. It is located at kilometric point (KP) 25.061 on the Bourg-en-Bresse—Bellegarde railway.

Originally opened in 1876, the station was closed in 2005 for renovations along the Haut-Bugey railway as well as reconstruction of the station, prior to re-opening in 2010.

As of 2020, the station is owned and operated by the SNCF and served by TER Auvergne-Rhône-Alpes trains.

== History ==
The station was opened by the Compagnie des Dombes et des chemins de fer Sud-Est on 10 March 1876 along with a section of railway from Bourg-en-Bresse to Simandre-sur-Suran. The station was further acquired by the Compagnie des chemins de fer de Paris à Lyon et à la Méditerranée on 1 January 1884.

The station was closed for reconstruction in 2005, along with the remainder of the line, before re-opening on 12 December 2010. The old passenger building was torn down in June 2010, along with those of Ceyzériat and Villereversure.

In 2016, the SNCF estimated that 931 passengers traveled through the station.

== Services ==
=== Passenger services ===
Classified as a PANG (point d'accès non géré), the station is unstaffed without any passenger services.

=== Train services ===
As of 2020, the station is served by the following services:

- Regional services (TER Auvergne-Rhône-Alpes 31) Bourg-en-Bresse ... Brion—Montréal-la-Cluse ... Oyonnax ... Saint-Claude.

=== Intermodality ===
The station is equipped with a parking lot for passenger vehicles and secured storage for bicycles.

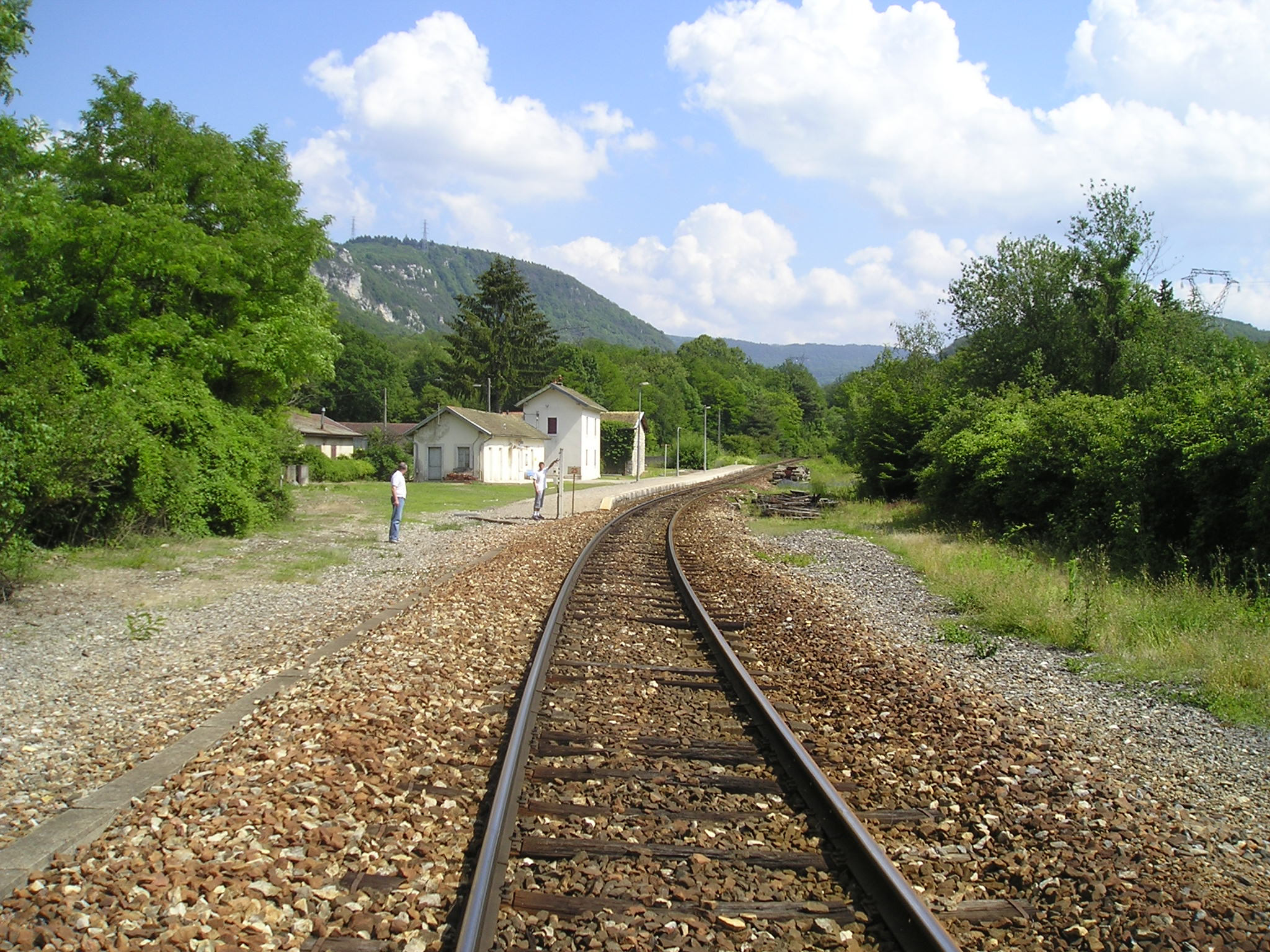
Cize—Bolozon station months before closure in 2005

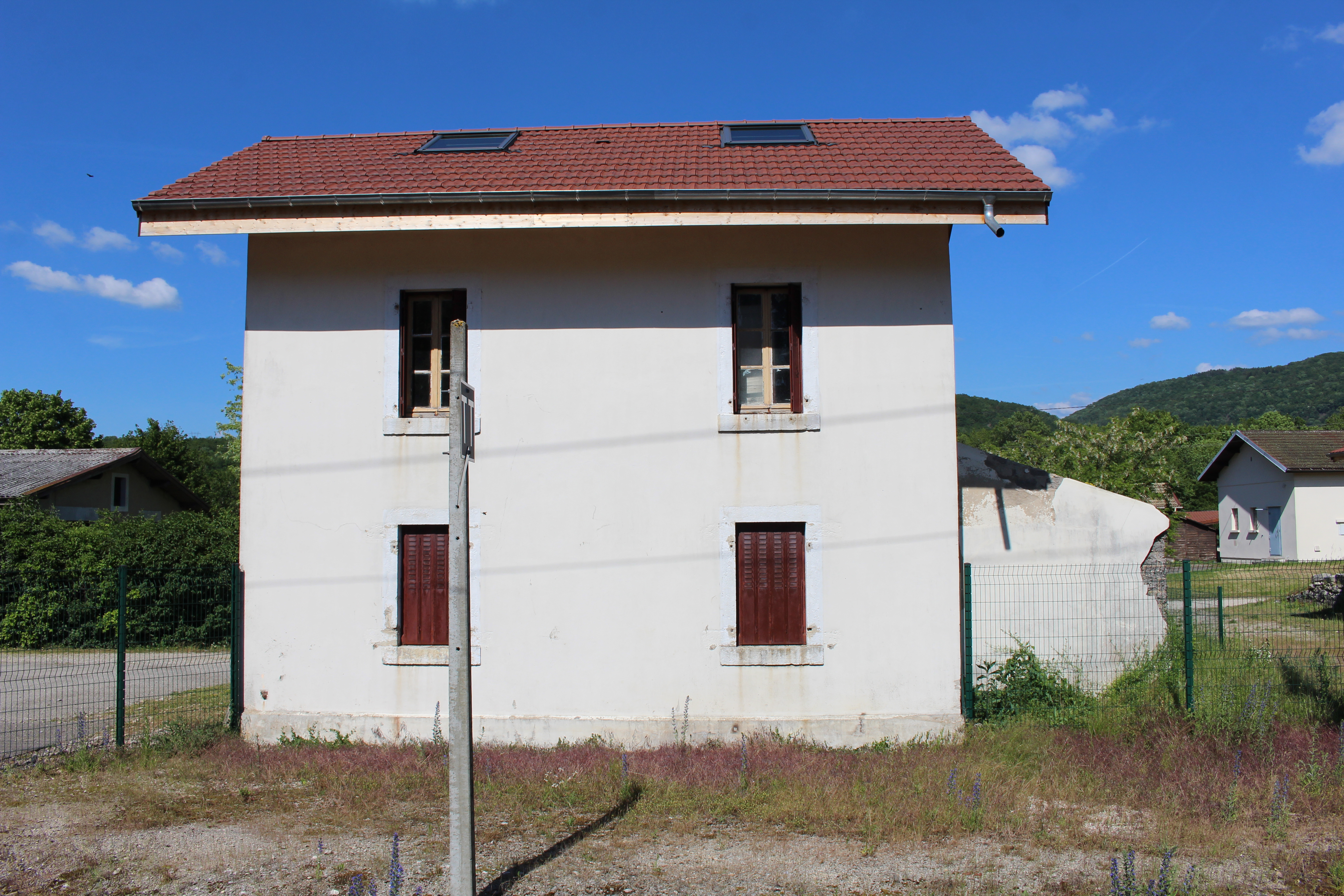
Old passenger building prior to removal

== See also ==
- Cize—Bolozon viaduct
- List of SNCF stations in Auvergne-Rhône-Alpes
