= Ceyzériat station =

Railway station in Ceyzériat, France

Coordinates: 46°11′01″N 5°19′33″E

Ceyzériat
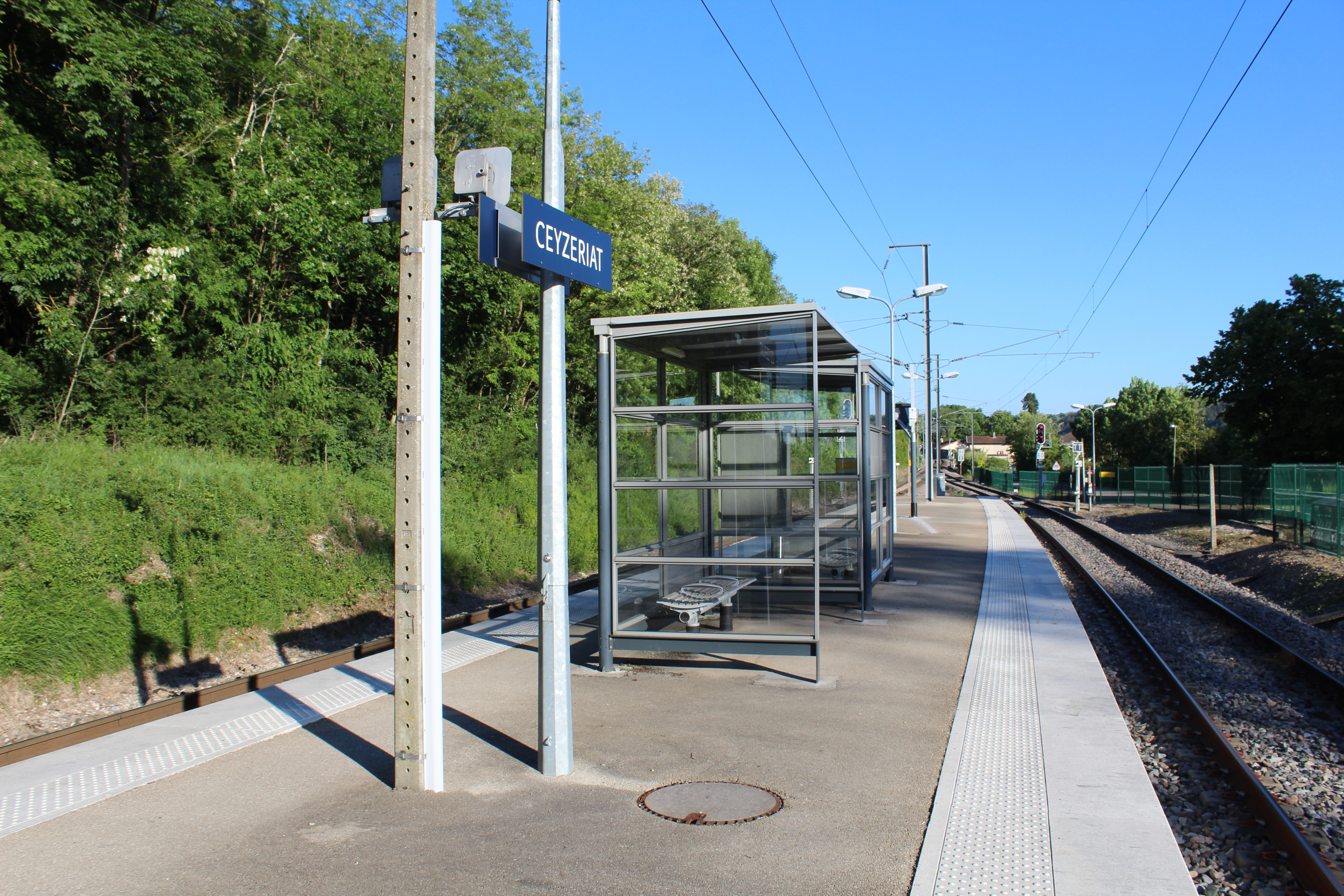
- Ceyzériat station in May 2017

General information
- Location: Rue de la Gare; 01250 Ceyzériat; Ain; France
- Elevation: 325 m (1,066 ft)
- Owner: SNCF
- Operator: SNCF
- Line: Bourg-en-Bresse–Bellegarde railway
- Distance: 9.864 km
- Platforms: 1
- Tracks: 2

History
- Opened: 10 March 1876
- Closed: 2005–2010 (for renovations)

Passengers
- 2019: 6,762

Services
Preceding station	TER Auvergne-Rhône-Alpes	Following station
Bourg-en-Bresse Terminus	31	Villereversure towards Oyonnax
Location

Ceyzériat station (French: Gare de Ceyzériat) is a French railway station located in commune of Ceyzériat, Ain department in the Auvergne-Rhône-Alpes region. It is located at kilometric point (KP) 9.864 on the Bourg-en-Bresse–Bellegarde railway.

Originally opened in 1876, the station was closed in 2005 for renovations along the Haut-Bugey railway as well as reconstruction of the station, prior to re-opening in 2010.

As of 2020, the station is owned and operated by the SNCF and served by TER Auvergne-Rhône-Alpes trains.

== History ==
The station was opened by the Compagnie des Dombes et des chemins de fer Sud-Est on 10 March 1876 along with a section of railway from Bourg-en-Bresse to Simandre-sur-Suran.

The station was closed for reconstruction in 2005, along with the remainder of the line, before re-opening on 12 December 2010. The old passenger building was torn down in June 2010, along with those of Villereversure and Cize-Bolozon.

In 2019, the SNCF estimated that 6,762 passengers traveled through the station.

== Services ==
=== Passenger services ===
Classified as a PANG (point d'accès non géré), the station is unstaffed without any passenger services.

=== Train services ===
As of 2020, the station is served by the following services:

- Regional services (TER Auvergne-Rhône-Alpes 31) Bourg-en-Bresse ... Brion-Montréal-la-Cluse ... Oyonnax ... Saint-Claude.

=== Intermodality ===
The station is equipped with a parking lot for passenger vehicles and secured storage for bicycles.

== Gallery ==
Ceyzériat station image gallery

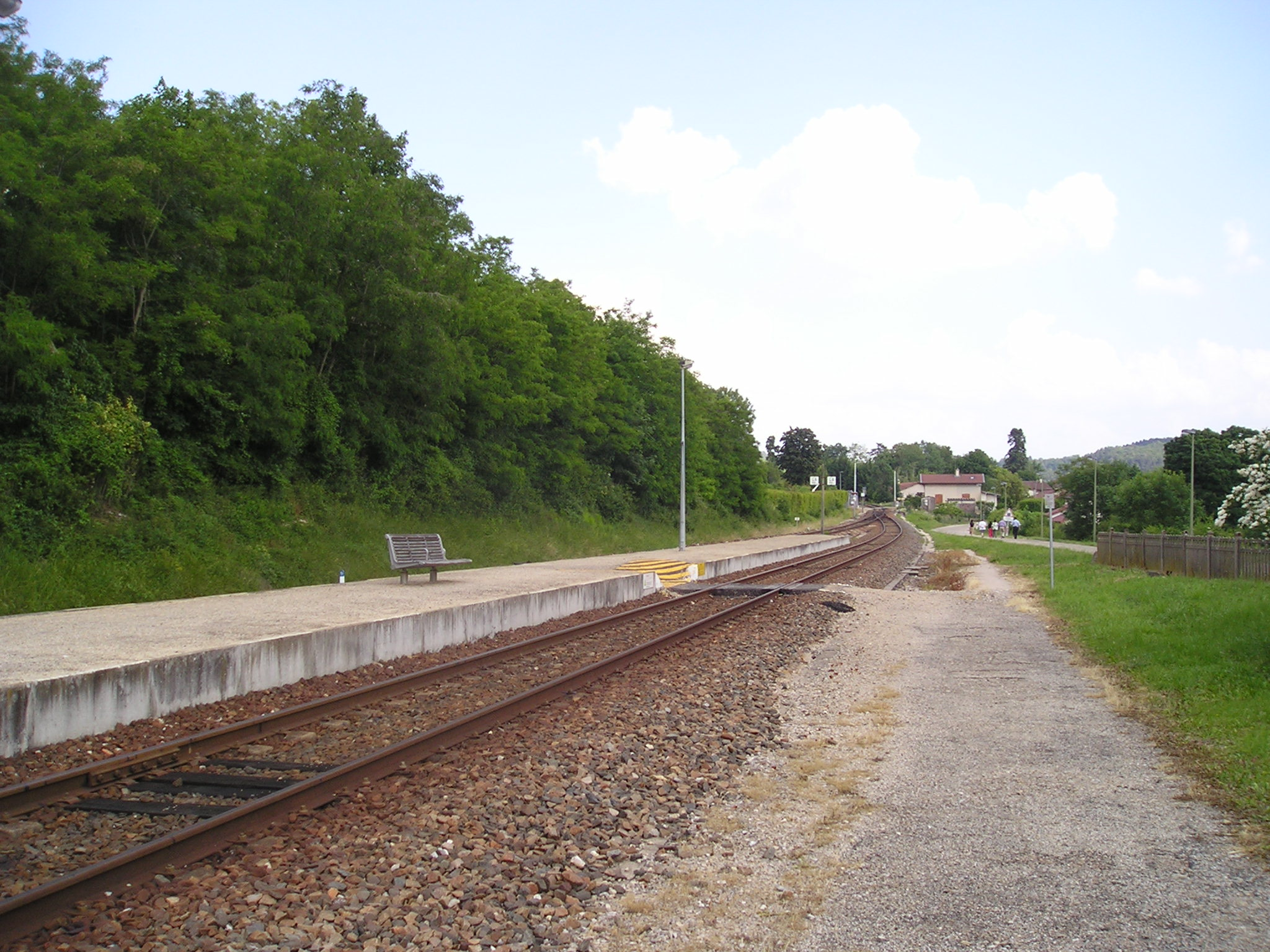
Ceyzériat station in June 2005, two months prior to closing for reconstruction

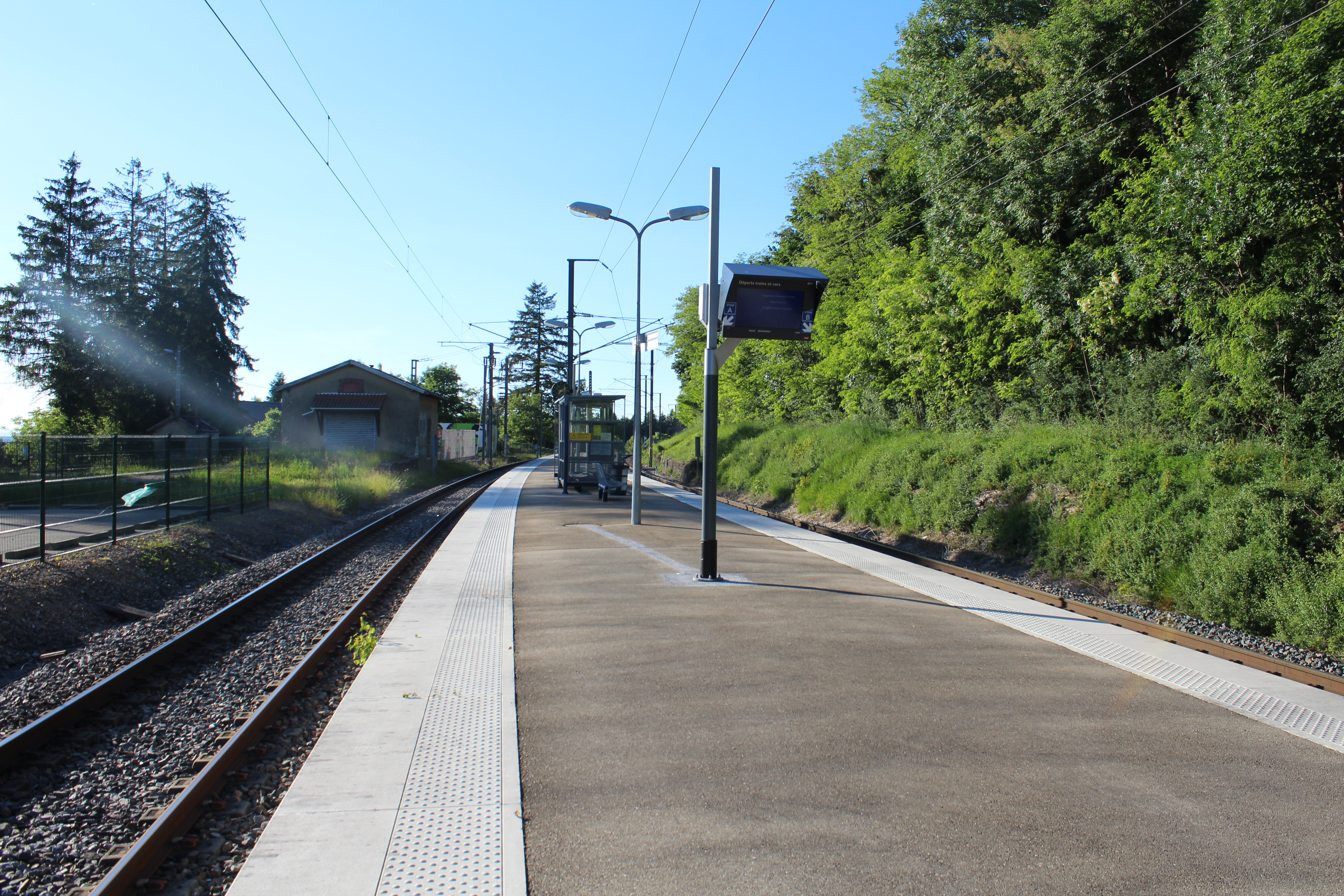
Platform after 2005–2010 reconstruction

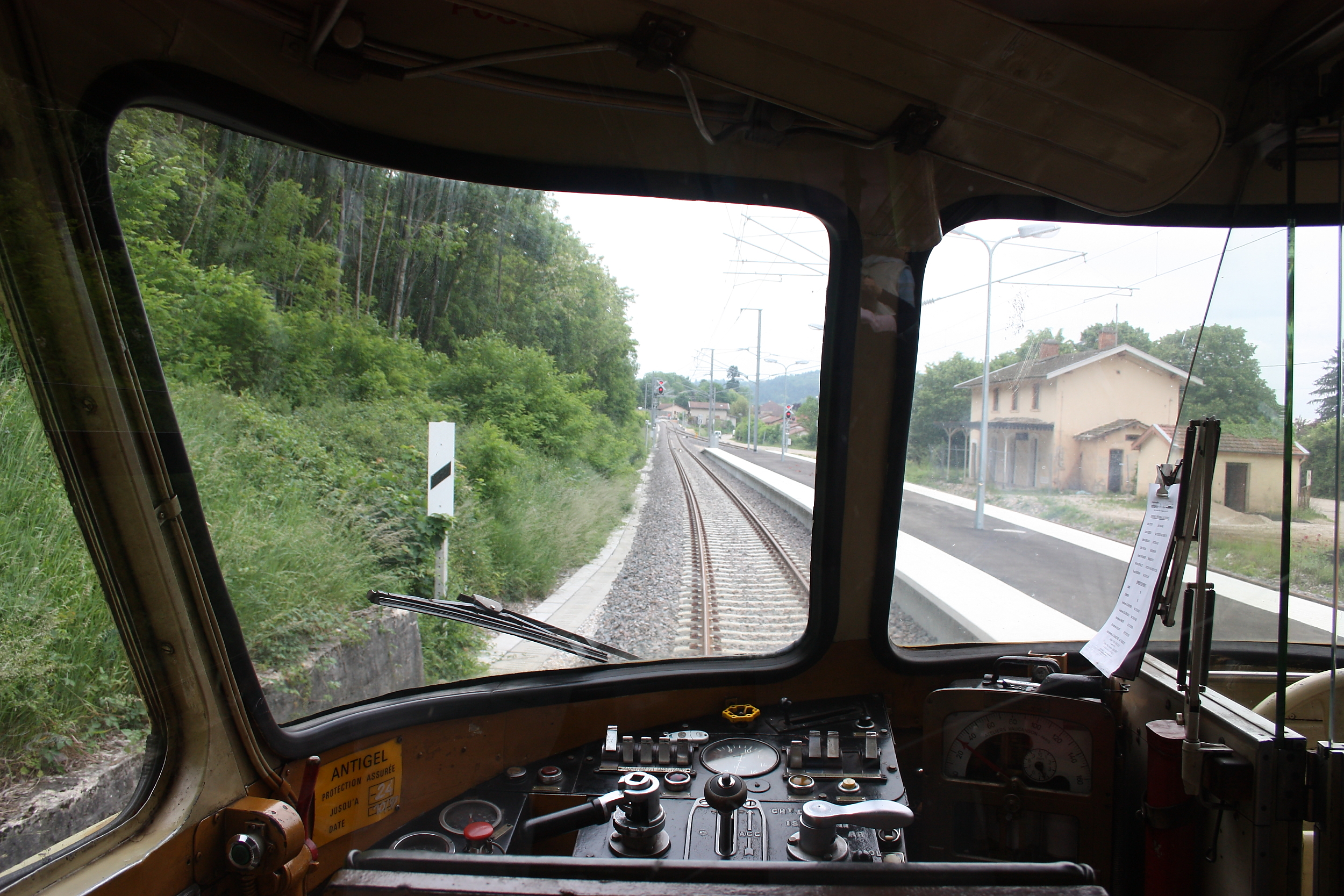
View from a X 4208 railcar, a couple of days prior to the demolition of the old passenger building

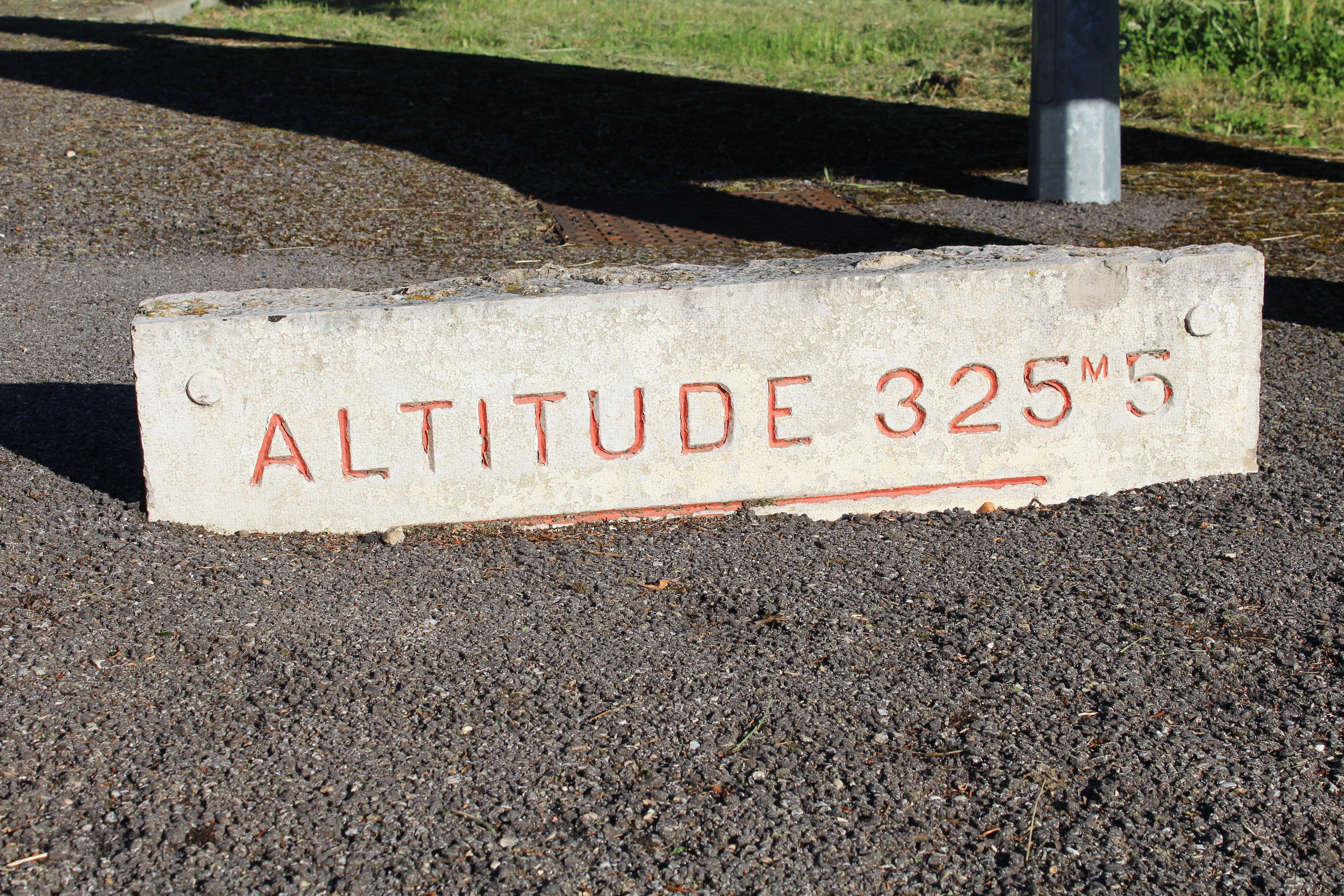
Remnants of the previous passenger building

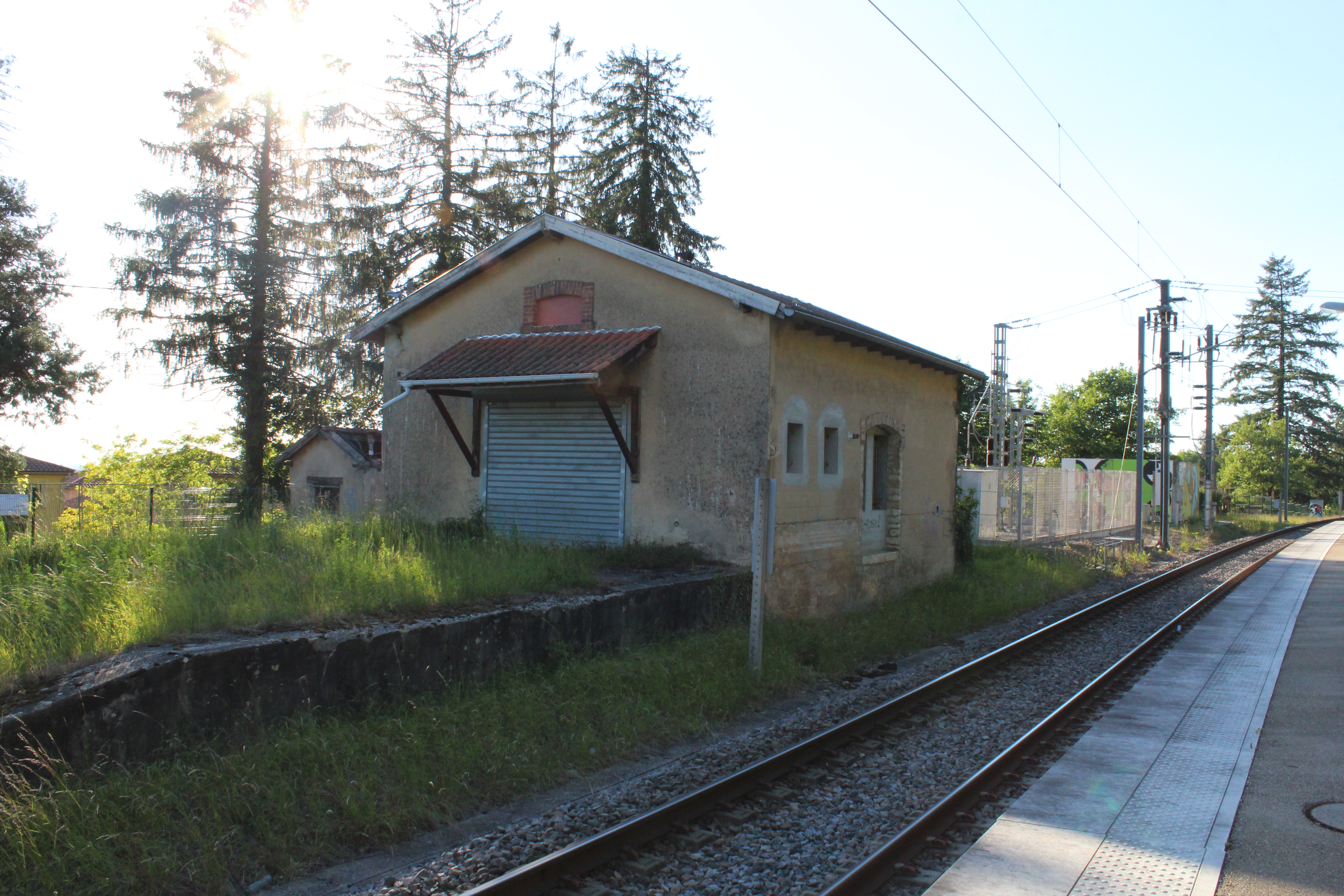
Old halle à marchandises
