= Nurieux station =

Railway station in Nurieux-Volognat, France

Coordinates: 46°11′03″N 5°31′58″E

Nurieux
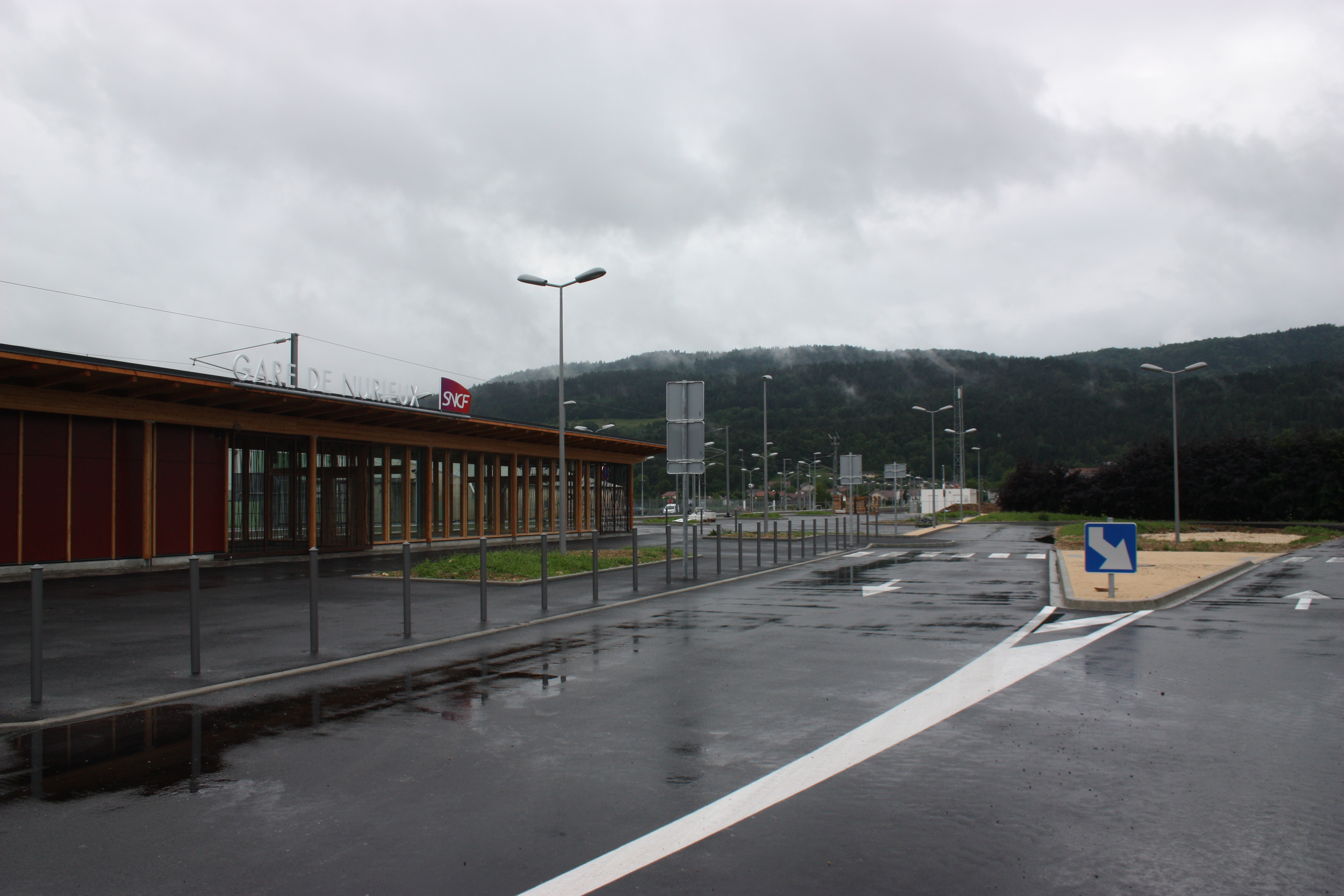
- Nurieux station passenger building in 2010.

General information
- Location: RD979; 01460 Nurieux-Volognat; Ain; France
- Elevation: 484 metres (1,588 ft)
- Owner: SNCF
- Operator: SNCF
- Line: Ligne du Haut-Bugey
- Distance: 33.468 km
- Platforms: 2
- Tracks: 3 + service tracks

History
- Opened: 29 March 1877

Passengers
- 2019: 20,701

Services
Preceding station	TGV Lyria	Following station
Bourg-en-Bresse towards Paris-Lyon	Paris to Lausanne	Bellegarde towards Lausanne
Preceding station	TER Auvergne-Rhône-Alpes	Following station
Cize—Bolozon towards Bourg-en-Bresse	31	Brion—Montréal-la-Cluse towards Oyonnax
Location

Nurieux station (French: Gare de Nurieux) is a French railway station located in the commune of Nurieux-Volognat, Ain department in the Auvergne-Rhône-Alpes region. Established at an elevation of 484 meters, the station is located at kilometric point (KP) 33.468 on the Ligne du Haut-Bugey, between the stations of Cize—Bolozon and Brion—Montréal-la-Cluse.

== History ==
In 2019, the SNCF estimated that 20,701 passengers traveled through the station.

== See also ==
- List of SNCF stations in Auvergne-Rhône-Alpes
- List of TGV stations
