= Cize–Bolozon viaduct =

Road and rail bridge over the Ain in eastern France

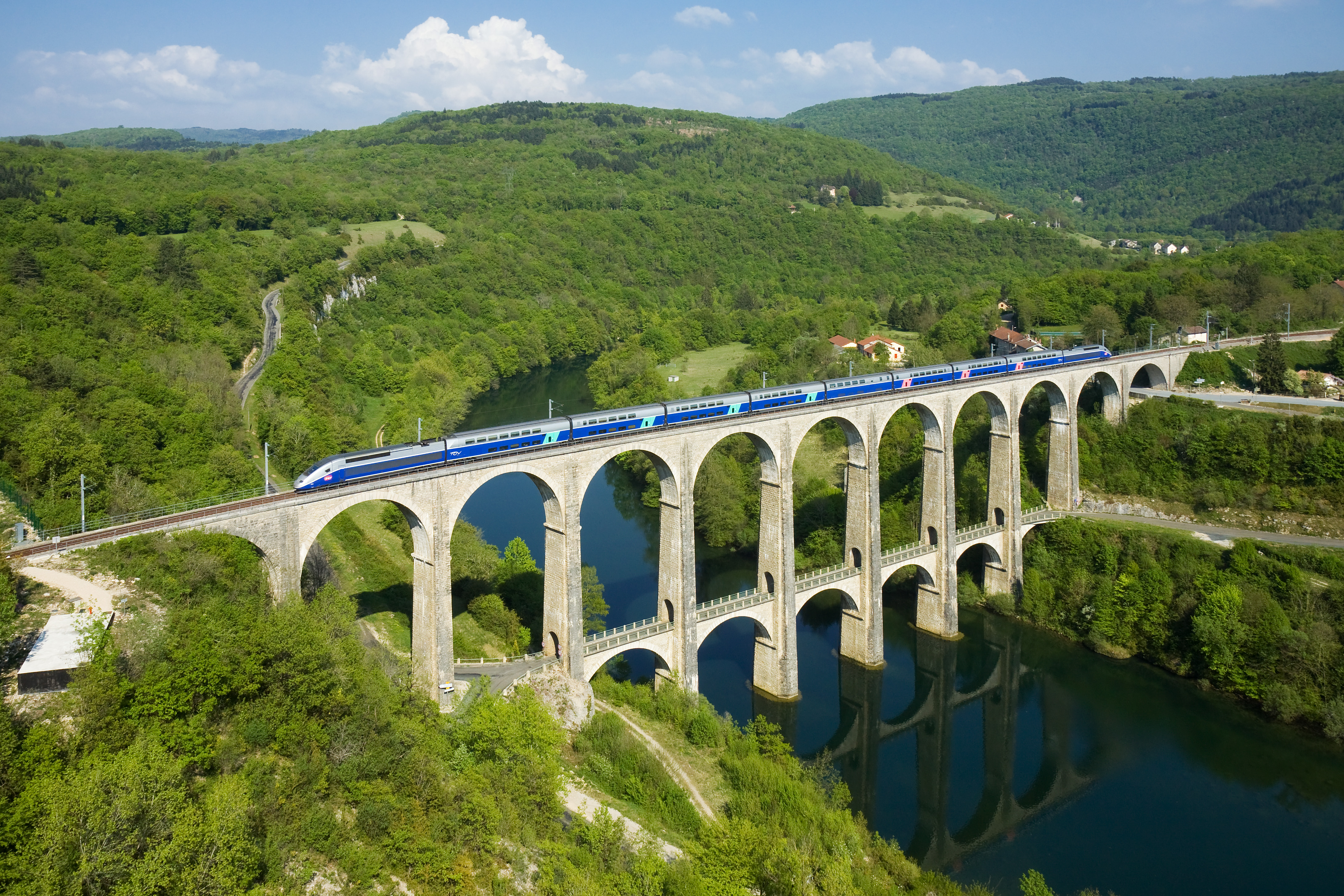
- A view of the viaduct from the southwest while crossed by an upper-level TGV
- Coordinates: 46°12′56″N 5°27′04″E
- Carries: Ligne du Haut-Bugey; Local road
- Crosses: Ain gorge
- Locale: France

Characteristics
- Total length: 273 metres (896 ft)
- Height: 73 metres (240 ft)
- No. of spans: 11

History
- Architect: Jean-François Blassel
- Opened: 1875

Location
- Interactive map of Cize–Bolozon viaduct

The Cize–Bolozon viaduct is a combination rail and vehicular viaduct crossing the Ain gorge in France. It is a structure that connects the communes of Cize and Bolozon in the Ain département.

In 1875, an original span built in the same location but was destroyed later in World War II. The viaduct was reconstructed as an urgent post-war project due to its position on a main line to Paris. It reopened in May 1950.

It has two different levels: the upper level is a railway while the lower carries road traffic. The railway was closed for reinforcement and restoration in 2005, and reopened in December 2010 as part of the Ligne du Haut-Bugey. The lower level is a local road from Poncin to Thoirette.

== See also ==
- Cize–Bolozon station
