= Bellegarde station =

Train stop in eastern France

Bellegarde
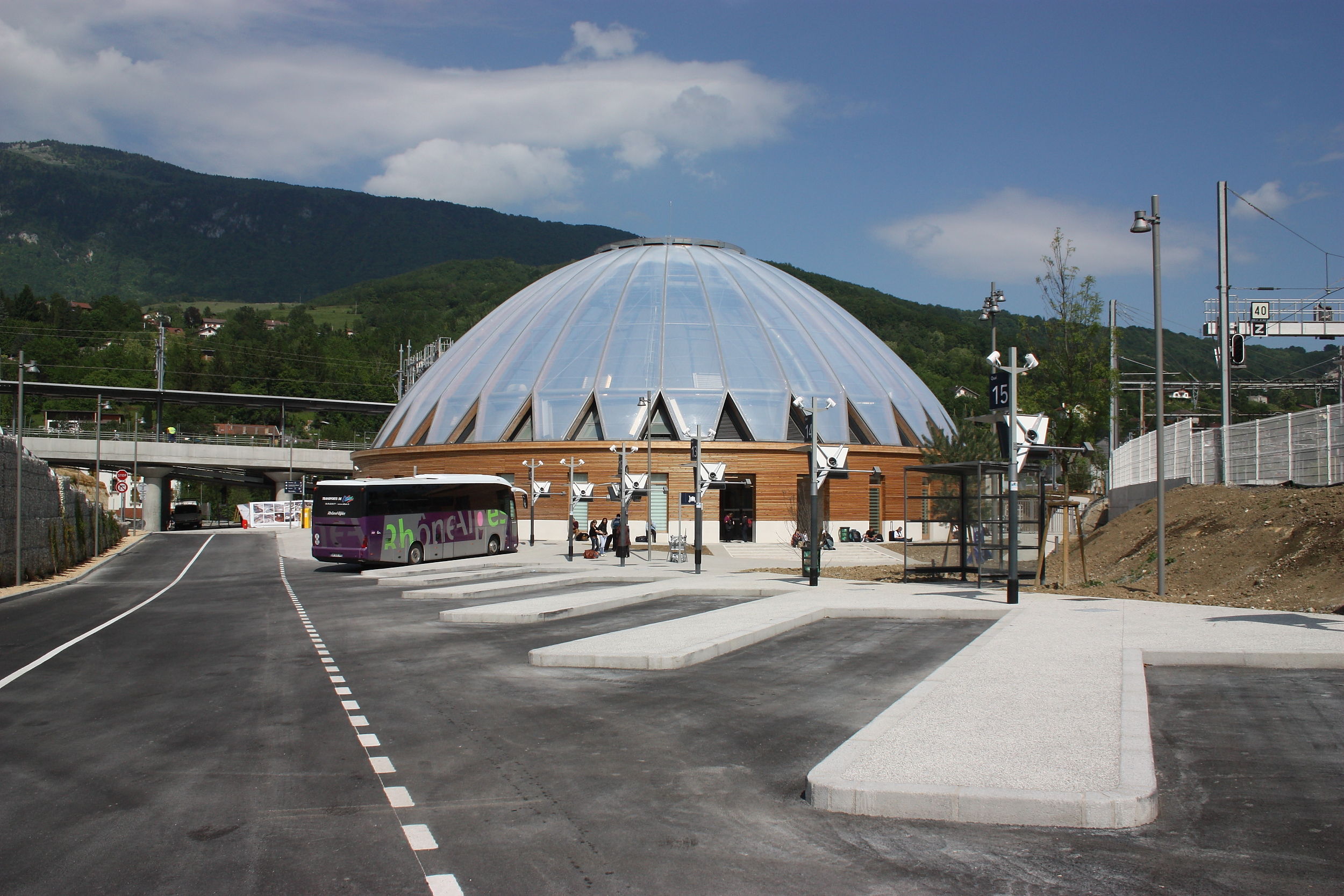
- The station building in 2010

General information
- Location: 1, place Charles-de-Gaulle; Valserhône; France
- Coordinates: 46°06′34″N 5°49′25″E
- Owner: SNCF
- Lines: Haut-Bugey line; Longeray-Léaz-Le Bouveret line; Lyon–Geneva line
- Train operators: SNCF; Swiss Federal Railways

Other information
- Station code: 87745000
- Fare zone: 400 (unireso)

Passengers
- 2024: 1,769,256

Services
Preceding station	SNCF	Following station
Paris-Lyon Terminus	TGV	Annemasse towards Évian-les-Bains
Paris-Lyon Terminus	TGV inOui Seasonal service	Annemasse towards Saint-Gervais
Preceding station	TGV Lyria	Following station
Nurieux towards Paris-Lyon	Paris to Geneva	Geneva Terminus
Bourg-en-Bresse towards Paris-Lyon	Paris to Lausanne	Geneva towards Lausanne
Lyon-Part-Dieu towards Marseille-Saint-Charles	Marseille to Lausanne	Geneva towards Lausanne
Preceding station	TER Auvergne-Rhône-Alpes	Following station
Culoz towards Valence	2	Geneva Terminus
Seyssel-Corbonod towards Lyon-Part-Dieu	3	Geneva Terminus
Seyssel-Corbonod towards Lyon-Part-Dieu	3	Valleiry towards Évian-les-Bains or Saint-Gervais
Seyssel-Corbonod towards Chambéry	51	Geneva Terminus
Preceding station	Léman Express	Following station
Terminus	L6	Pougny—Chancy towards Genève-Cornavin
Location
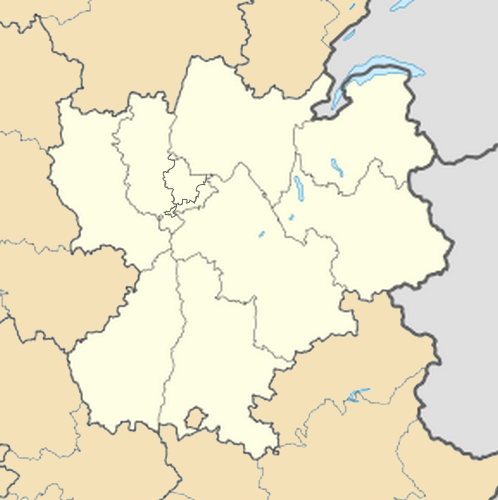
- Location within Auvergne-Rhône-Alpes Location within Rhône-Alpes Location within France

Bellegarde station (French: Gare de Bellegarde) is a railway station served by TGV, TER Auvergne-Rhône-Alpes and Léman Express located in Bellegarde-sur-Valserine, in the département of Ain, France.

The first station building opened in 1858 to allow a stop on the line between Seyssel and Geneva. The wooden building was destroyed by fire and requiring the construction of a new building in 1907. Over the years, other lines reached to the station, causing passenger numbers to grow. The first TGV service was in 1981 between Paris Gare de Lyon and Geneva. From a simple railway station, the site underwent a major restructuring in 2010 to become an interchange. This was triggered by the decision to renovate the Ligne du Haut-Bugey.

== Position on the railway network ==
It is a junction station (Keilbahnhof), situated at kilometer 134,252 of the Lyon–Geneva railway, and kilometer 64,523 of the Ligne du Haut-Bugey. Its altitude is 378m.

== History of Bellegarde railway station ==
=== Before the creation of the SNCF ===
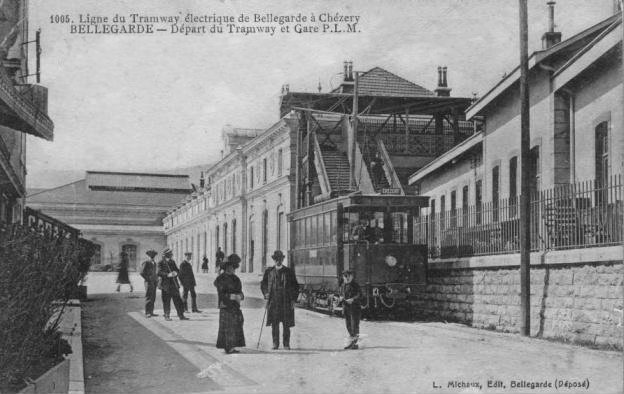
Façade in the early 20th century. In the foreground, a motor car of the Bellegarde-Chézery tram. Bellegarde was a terminus for this line which operated from 1912 to 1937.

Railway history started in Bellegarde-sur-Valserine in the middle of the 19th century. In 1830, the first studies of a Bellegarde-Geneva line were done. The decision on construction of the Lyon–Geneva railway was part of a project to reduce the travel time from Paris to the Swiss border from 6 days to 12 hours, was finalized when a law was passed on 10 June 1853 by Napoleon III concerning the commitment by the treasury to the construction of a railway to the frontier of Geneva. The Seyssel-Geneva section was opened on 18 March 1858 with a halt in Bellegarde where the station building was in the style of a Swiss chalet. The station was designed as a last junction before the frontier, avoiding lines connecting French territory passing through Swiss territory. It was thus used for customs controls on people and goods.

A new service was inaugurated when, on 30 August 1880, the line from Longeray to Thonon via Annemasse and Evian was opened. This service was operated by the Chemins de fer de Paris à Lyon et à la Méditerranée (PLM) company. Two years later on 1 April 1882, the Cluse-Bellegarde section of the Ligne du Haut-Bugey opened. This section completed the line from Bourg en Bresse to Bellegarde operated by Compagnie des Dombes et du Sud-Est. In 1883, the PLM acquired the Compagnie des Dombes, and from then on, Bellegarde was exclusively served by the PLM.

On 1 August 1904, a fire completely destroyed the station building. A new building was constructed on the site of the old one and opened in 1907. This in turn was severely damaged by fire in the night of the 9 April 2003.

=== After 1938 – the creation of the SNCF ===
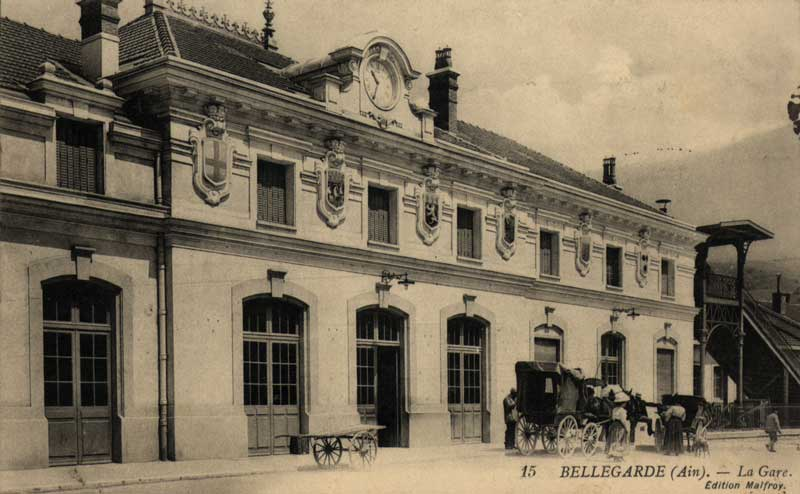
The façade on a mid 20th century postcard

Upon its creation in 1938, the SNCF took over the operation of the Culoz-Bellegarde line from the PLM, and over time created new links to western Switzerland. Bellegarde station became connected to the whole of France.

As technology evolved with time, different types of railcar passed through Bellegarde, An X2700 class RGP2 passed through on its inaugural trip from Lyon-Perrache to Geneva on 30 June 1954. The following year, on 16 December 1955, the Culoz - Bellegarde section was electrified with 1.5 kV DC. From 10 June 1959, the Alpazur connection (Genève - Bellegarde - Grenoble - Veynes-Dévoluy - Digne) returning via the ligne des Alpes was operated with X4200 class panoramic railcars. Then on 31 May 1964, a first-class express train, Le Rhodanien, was put on the line linking Geneva to Marseille. 1969 saw the arrival Catalan-Talgo trains on the creation of a Trans-Europ-Express link between Geneva and Barcelona via Bellegarde, Chambéry et Grenoble on 1 June. In 1972, passenger trains were making up to 12 return journeys per day between Geneva and Grenoble. On 1 October 1972, X4500 class railcars went into service on the Valence - Geneva route via Grenoble, Chambéry et Bellegarde, then on 28 September 1975, first generation turbotrains (so-called 'ETGs') took over. They were so successful that they soon needed to be coupled in pairs to meet the demand.

=== The arrival of the TGV ===
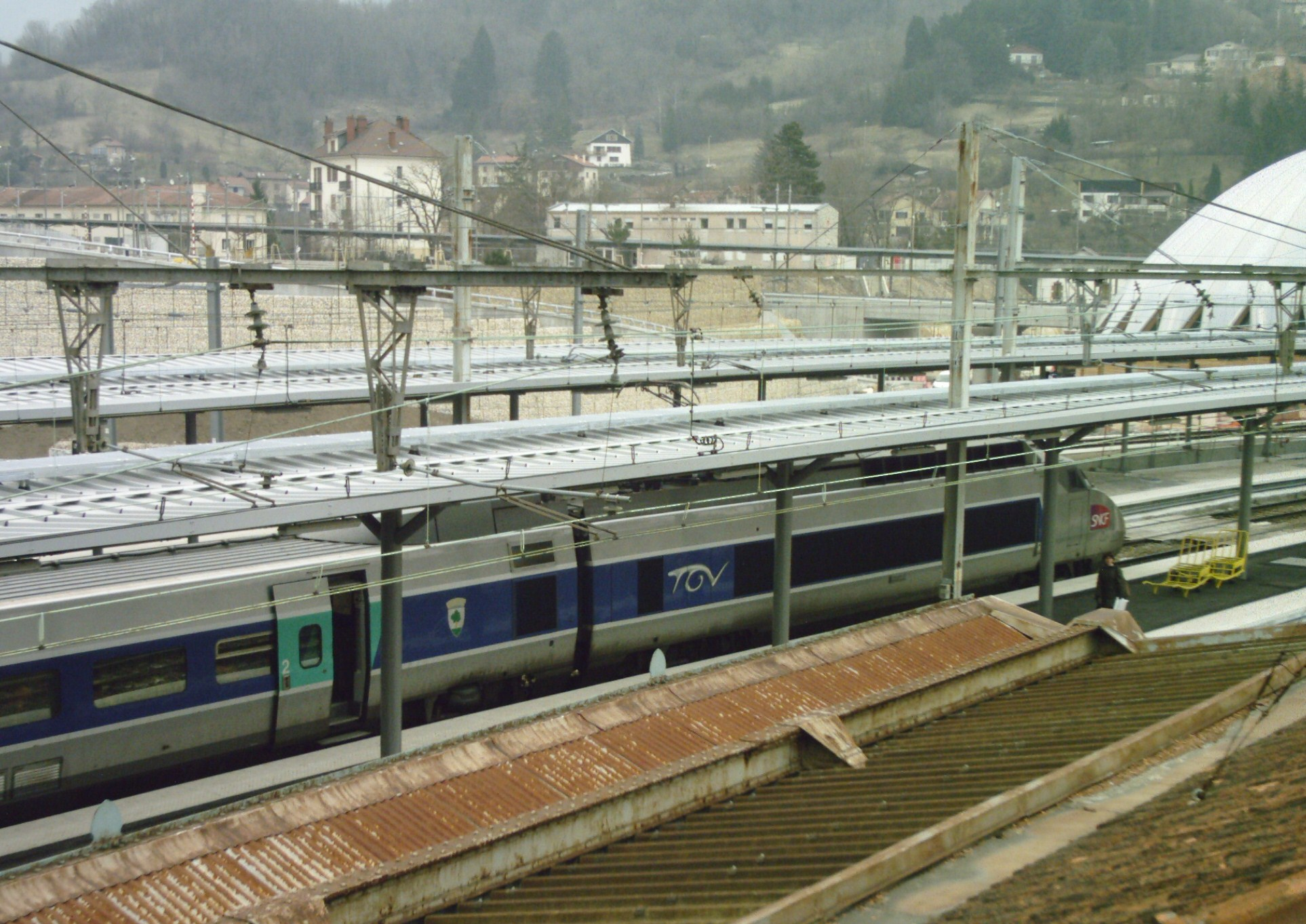
A Geneva-bound TGV arrives

The introduction of TGV services to Bellegarde-sur-Valserine on 22 September 1981, the completion of the autoroutes from Lyon to Geneva and the opening of the Mont Blanc Tunnel all greatly improved access to Bellegarde, enabling the town to develop through industrial restructuring which allowed Bellegarde to maintain unemployment below the national average. Two daily services between Paris and Geneva were created, making Bellegarde the first town with less than 20,000 inhabitants to get a daily TGV link to Paris, although night trains to Paris were discontinued at the same time. However the advent of TGV services coincided with the decline of the Geneva – Barcelona Trans-Europ-Express; on 23 May 1982 the Catalan Talgo was replaced by a EuroCity service. and the IC 5642/3 train took over the name le Rhodanien. It linked Geneva to Marseille via Bellegarde, Chambéry, Grenoble, Valence and Avignon. In summer 1983, a TGV Paris – Geneva/Annecy was created, with trains being split or joined at Culoz. In the 1980s, as with many other French stations, services to Bellegarde were generally reduced or cancelled. After summer 1984, the La Rochelle – Saint-Gervais service was stopped. In 1985, Z 7500, Z 9500 and Z 9600 railcars were introduced on the Lyon – Genève/Evian/Saint-Gervais services, then in 1987, the Class BB 25200 locomotives (made available by the introduction of BB 22200 locos) were used with push-pull Corail trains between Lyon and Geneva. Service reductions continued in the 1990s, and apart from the long-distance service from Hendaye/Irun to Geneva, only regional TER services were left. In 2001, the Corail Lunéa Rhône-Océan Lyon–Quimper service was extended to Geneva with a stop in Bellegarde.

In 1991, a project to bring Paris and Geneva closer was launched: to build a high speed line alongside the A40. This operation, named the LGV des Titans was estimated at 12 billion francs (2 billion euros) which was much too expensive, so was abandoned in 1997 in favour of less costly projects. It was decided to upgrade the Ligne du Haut-Bugey instead.

== Lines which converge on Bellegarde-sur-Valserine ==
Several lines meet at Bellegarde-sur-Valserine station. The first line to arrive was the Lyon–Geneva railway in 1858. The line came from Paris and Geneva via Arlod and from Geneva via the Crêt d'Eau tunnel. At the end of the 19th century, three other lines reached Bellegarde-sur-Valserine, the Longeray-Léaz - Le Bouveret line via the Crédo tunnel in 1880, the Ligne du Haut-Bugey in 1882 and the Collonges-Fort-l'Écluse – Divonne-les-Bains railway serving the Pays de Gex in 1899.

== Services ==
The following services stop at Bellegarde:

- TGV: high-speed service between Paris-Lyon and Évian-les-Bains.
- TGV inOui: on weekends during the winter season, two round-trips per day between Paris-Lyon and Saint-Gervais-les-Bains-Le Fayet.
- TGV Lyria: high-speed service between Paris-Lyon/Marseille-Saint-Charles and Genève-Cornavin/Lausanne.
- TER Auvergne-Rhône-Alpes:
  - regional service between Valence-Ville and Genève-Cornavin.
  - regional service between Lyon-Part-Dieu and Genève-Cornavin, Évian-les-Bains, or Saint-Gervais-les-Bains-Le Fayet.
  - regional service between Chambéry-Challes-les-Eaux and Genève-Cornavin.
- Léman Express L6: rush-hour service to Genève-Cornavin.

== See also ==
- List of SNCF stations in Auvergne-Rhône-Alpes
