= Bourg-en-Bresse station =

Railway station in Bourg-en-Bresse, France

Bourg-en-Bresse
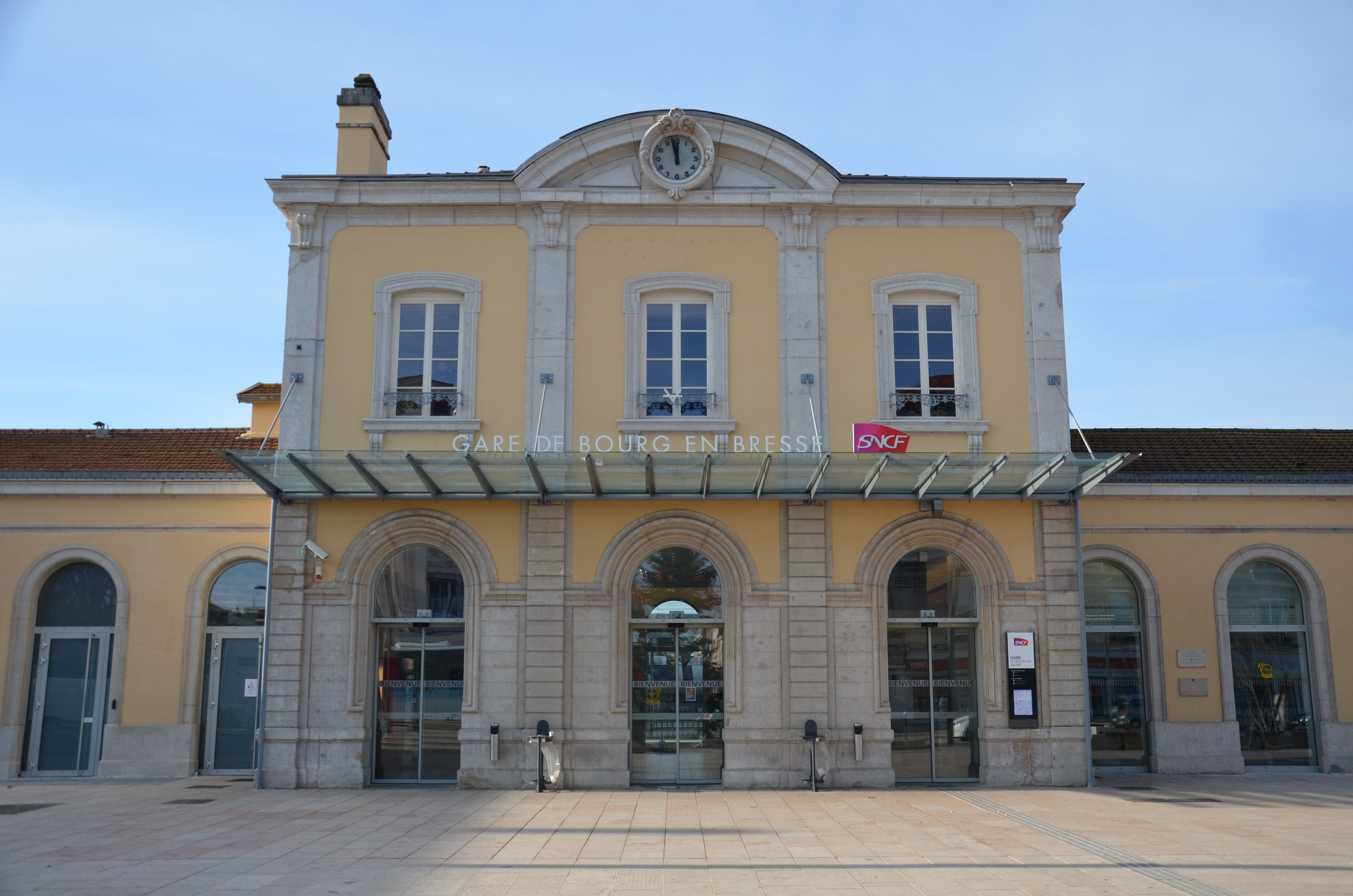
- Bourg-en-Bresse railway station

General information
- Location: 12 avenue Pierre-Semard; 01000 Bourg-en-Bresse; Ain; France
- Coordinates: 46°12′0″N 5°12′53″E
- Owner: SNCF
- Operator: SNCF
- Lines: Ligne du Haut-Bugey; Mouchard–Bourg-en-Bresse railway Lyon–Bourg-en-Bresse railway Mâcon–Ambérieu railway
- Platforms: 4
- Tracks: 7 (+ service tracks)

Other information
- Station code: 87743005

History
- Opened: 23 June 1856

Passengers
- 2024: 2,062,701
Services
| Preceding station | SNCF | Following station |
|---|---|---|
| Mâcon-Loché TGV towards Paris-Lyon | TGV inOui | Aix-les-Bains-Le Revard towards Annecy |
| Mâcon-Loché TGV towards Paris-Lyon | TGV inOui Weekends and holidays | Bellegarde towards Évian-les-Bains |
| Preceding station | TER Auvergne-Rhône-Alpes | Following station |
| Polliat towards Mâcon | 30 | Saint-Martin-du-Mont towards Ambérieu |
| Terminus | 31 | Ceyzériat towards Oyonnax |
| Terminus | 32 | Servas-Lent towards Lyon-Vaise |
| Preceding station | TER Bourgogne-Franche-Comté | Following station |
| Terminus | TER | Saint-Amour towards Besançon |
| Saint-Amour towards Dijon | TER | Terminus |
Location

Bourg-en-Bresse station (French: Gare de Bourg-en-Bresse) is a railway station located in Bourg-en-Bresse, Ain, eastern France. The station was opened in 1855 and is located on the Ligne du Haut-Bugey, Mouchard–Bourg-en-Bresse railway, Lyon–Bourg-en-Bresse railway and Mâcon–Ambérieu railway. The train services are operated by SNCF.

== Train services ==
The station is served by the following service(s):

- High speed services (TGV) Paris - Bellegarde - Geneva
- High speed services (TGV) Paris - Bellegarde - Annemasse - Evian-les-Bains
- High speed services (TGV) Paris - Aix-les-Bains - Annecy
- Regional services (TER Bourgogne-Franche-Comté) Besançon - Mouchard - Lons-le-Saunier - Bourg-en-Bresse - Lyon
- Regional services (TER Bourgogne-Franche-Comté) Dijon - St-Jean-de-Losne - Seurre - Louhans - Bourg-en-Bresse
- Local services (TER Auvergne-Rhône-Alpes) Bourg-en-Bresse - Oyonnax - Saint-Claude
- Local services (TER Auvergne-Rhône-Alpes) Ambérieu - Bourg-en-Bresse - Mâcon
