= Ligne du Haut-Bugey =

Railway line in France

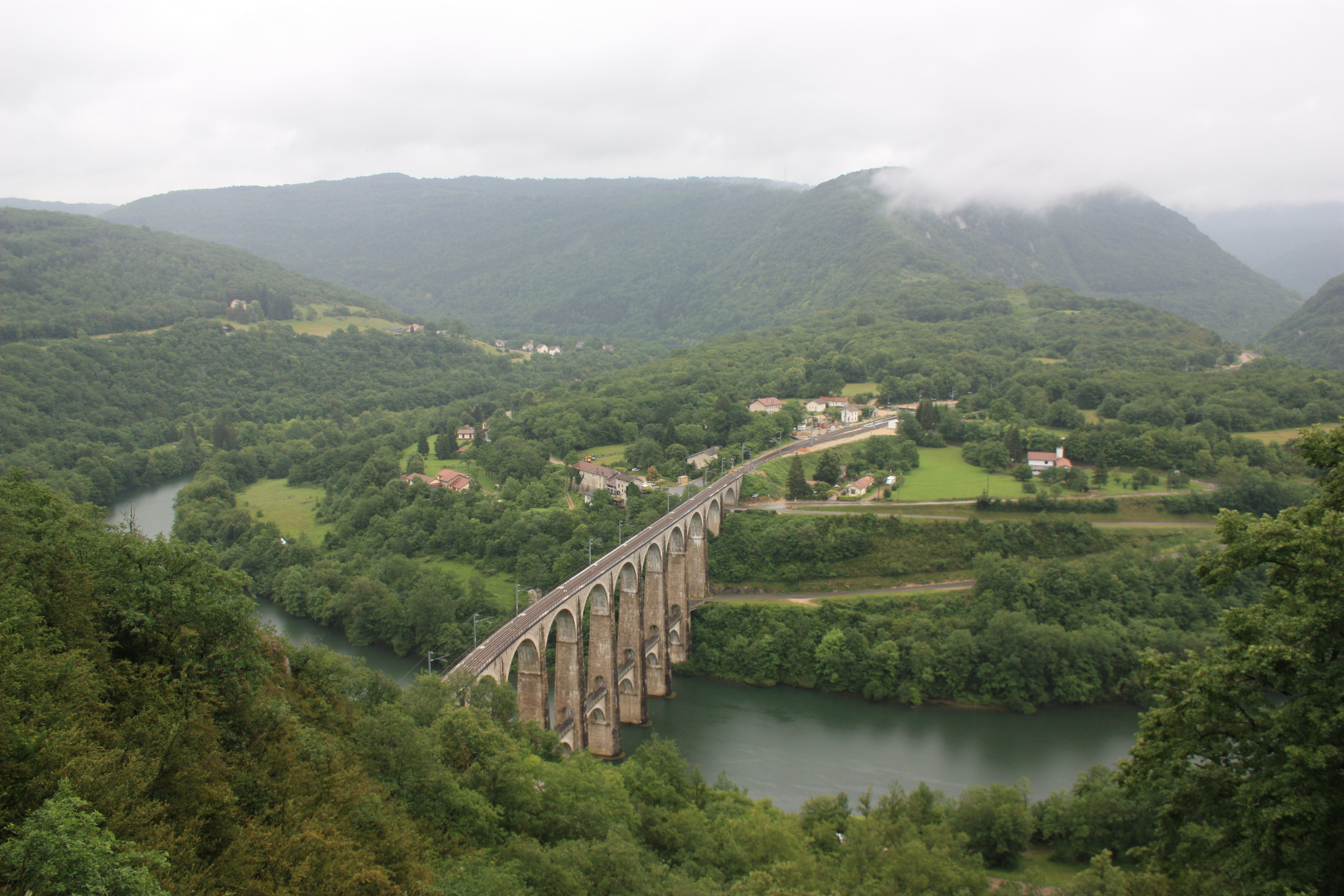
- Cize-Bolozon station and viaduct

Technical
- Line length: 64.727 km (40.219 mi)
- Rack system: no
- Track gauge: 1,435 mm (4 ft 8 1/2 in) standard gauge
- Minimum radius: 300 m (984 ft)
- Electrification: 1.5 kV DC or 25 kV 50 Hz
- Operating speed: 120 km/h (75 mph)
- Maximum incline: 35 ‰

The Haut-Bugey line (French: Ligne du Haut-Bugey) (also nicknamed Lignes des Carpates) is a railway line in France. It is 65 kilometres in length and connects Bourg-en-Bresse with Bellegarde, travelling through the Jura Mountains. For a century and a quarter after its opening in 1877, it was a local line only, and with steep grades, tight curves, and a long poorly ventilated tunnel, it was a challenging line to operate. It suffered a gradual decline, until in 2006 it had a new lease of life as its renovation was chosen as the most cost-effective way to shorten the journey time from Paris to Geneva. The line was closed in 2006 for complete reconstruction and electrification. The upgraded line was inaugurated on 2 December 2010 featuring 25 kV AC electrification, replacement of 18 level-crossings with bridges, avalanche protection and daylighting a tunnel. Today the line enables a faster link between the French TGV network and Geneva, giving a Paris to Geneva journey time of just over three hours (a saving of nearly 20 minutes compared to the old route via Ambérieu and Culoz).

== History ==
The history of the line began in 1866. The Compagnie des Dombes et des Chemins de Fer du Sud-Est (DSE), founded 1863, obtained a concession to build and operate a line linking the communes of Bourg-en-Bresse and La Cluse. This project, deemed insufficiently lucrative by the major companies was given life thanks to a law passed in 1865 allowing lines 'of local interest' to be financed by departments and municipalities. However work only began in September 1872 after delay caused by a conflict in 1870 with the Chemins de fer de Paris à Lyon et à la Méditerranée (PLM) with which the DSE was becoming a serious competitor. The outcome was a requirement to share stations with existing ones on the network and to use standard gauge track to ensure interoperability.

The difficult geography of the region required the line to be built in sections. The first to be opened, on 10 March 1876, was between Bourg-en-Bresse and Simandre-sur-Suran, about 22 km long. On 6 July the same year, the line was extended 3 km to reach Bolozon. These 3 km include the two significant engineering works on the line, the Racouse tunnel (1.7 km) and the Cize-Bolozon viaduct (245m long) over the river Ain at a cost of 339,000 francs. This multi-arch viaduct is unusual in that it carries the railway line and, on a lower level, the road. Later on, three new tunnels extended the line from Bolozon to La Cluse, including the Mornay tunnel, the longest on the line at 2.6 km. The line from Bourg-en-Bresse to La Cluse was opened on 29 March 1877 by the DSE.

After 1878, the Freycinet Plan called for standard gauge 'local interest lines' be integrated into the national network prior to nationalisation. The stated objective was to allow the local lines to be operated by the major companies. Mr. Mangini, the founder and director of the DSE, signed the contractual agreement to do this in 1881. This contract included the construction of the rest of the line, now classified of 'national interest', to Bellegarde. This section, completing the line, was opened on 1 April 1882. On 26 May 1883, the DSE signed the sale of the line to the PLM, with an effective date of 1 January 1884. Finally, the DSE was wound up on 23 January 1884. In 1886, the Andelot to Cluse line connected it to the Dijon to Lausanne artery.

The Ice harvesting factory on the Lac de Sylans was one of the largest of its kind in the 19th century. The arrival of the railway in 1882 enabled it to drastically increase production by cutting delivery time to Paris and increasing the volume that could be transported out of the factory.

Several incidents have coloured the history of the line. On 1 August 1904 the passenger building of Bellegarde station went up in flames, to be rebuilt in 1913. 1922 saw the two biggest incidents on the line, a landslide and a tunnel accident. On 11 April, a huge landslide near Neyrolles station completely cut the line. On 3 June a new alignment was opened. The most difficult operational feature of the line was its longest tunnel, the Mornay tunnel. Over 1300m of the tunnel is at 2.4% gradient; running towards Bellegarde, steam locomotives had to operate at full power, filling the tunnel with smoke. The natural ventilation was poor. In May 1922, 7 members of a train crew were asphyxiated and died. Subsequently, a special ventilation plant was opened in 1924, one of only two of it kind in France. It blew air into the tunnel when trains were passing through in the Bourg to La Cluse direction. In 1932 a new station was built at le Neyrolles on the new alignment. During the World War II, the line had strategic importance, as there was a lot of resistance activity in the Ain and on the Jura plateau. Several bridges were destroyed in 1944, starting with the bridge over the Suran on 8 July, followed by the Cize Bolozon viaduct on the 8th and the Reyssouze bridge on 2 September. The Cize Bolozon viaduct was only opened 5 years after the end of the war, on 14 May 1950.

On 2 May 2003 another accident occurred in the Mornay tunnel when a diesel railcar caught fire 300m from the Bolozon portal. The train was halted in the tunnel, but there were no casualties.

After the La Cluse - Bellegarde section was closed to passenger traffic in 1990, La Cluse station became a cul-de-sac; the only remaining service being Bourg-en-Bresse to Oyonnax and Saint-Claude all trains had to reverse.

A chord line was therefore laid avoiding la Cluse station, which was not served any more and closed. A new station, Brion—Montréal-la-Cluse was created on 1 June 1996.

In 2006 the Bourg-en-Bresse - Brion—Montréal-la-Cluse section was closed in preparation for “the Haut-Bugey Project”

The section La Cluse - Bellegarde is also known as "ligne des Carpates".

== Shortening the journey from Paris to Geneva ==
Geneva and the surrounding areas have long sought to reduce the rail journey time to Paris. Before the decision was taken to use the Haut Bugey line, several other options were considered. The one with the greatest impact would be the construction of a new high speed line (HSL) from Mâcon to Geneva. This option was broadly supported by the cantons of Geneva, Vaud, Valais as well as the départements of Ain and Haute-Savoie, and a detailed feasibility study was done by the French group Sofrérail and the Swiss group Bonnard et Gardel.

Having considered 220 km of possible routes, the final report, delivered in September 1990, recommended an HSL starting from the Mâcon-Ambérieu line below Polliat and entering Geneva either from the North or the South with a junction to the la Praille goods yard and a spur to Archamps to connect to the Longeray – Annemasse – Évian line. The most plausible option, at 77 km, bypassed Bourg to the North, passed through the Jura foothills in tunnels, used the Cize Bolozon viaduct to cross the Ain, paralleled the existing line at Nurieux, bypassed Nantua in a tunnel, crossed the Valserine to the North of Bellegarde, plunged through the Crêt d'Eau in a 6750m tunnel, and arrived in the Geneva on the south bank of the Rhone. The crossing of existing rails at Nurieux and Châtillon-en-Michaille would have allowed construction to take place in phases.

Options that could be combined with this project were upgrading the Pont-de-Veyle - Polliat section to 200 km/h, and electrification of the Sathonay-Bourg line, with construction of two new stations, Bourg-north and Nurieux. With these additions, the Paris - Geneva journey time would fall to 2h15 and Geneva Lyon to 1h04, Paris-Lausanne in 2h50 and Paris to Évian reduced by 90 minutes. However, this option was considered to be far too expensive at 2.3 billion euros, mostly due to the extensive engineering works needed, and the project went no further. The Swiss authorities continued to push the SNCF for an alternative more affordable proposal.

Upgrading the route actually used by the TGV (via Ambérieu and Culoz), to allow tilting TGVs would only allow a 10-minute reduction for tilting TGVs and 6 minute reduction for standard TGVs. A freight route in the Albarine gorge between Ambérieu and Culoz, using two long tunnels to straighten and shorten the line would have brought an 8-minute gain, but this was abandoned by the ministry of transport.

Yet another option, allowing a Paris Geneva journey time of 2h 49 minutes, was to link Geneva to the future Lyon Turin high speed line at Chambéry, by building a new Geneva - Annecy - Aix-les-Bains - Chambéry high speed line. The heavy environmental footprint, and the exorbitant cost of this option (1.3 billion euros) led to it too being abandoned on 18 September 1988.

Comparing the costs per minute saved, the Mâcon - Geneva HSL cost FF190,000/minute while the upgrading of the Haut-Bugey line cost only FF76,000/minute. The use of existing infrastructure also limited the environmental footprint.

Thus it was that the Haut-Bugey project was finally chosen.

=== The Haut-Bugey upgrade project ===
The project has upgraded existing tracks to enable higher speeds by both TGV and regular trains. While the result of the ‘Projet du Haut-Bugey’ is not a true Ligne à grande vitesse (HSL)—the line remains a ligne classique— but is still an important element in the TGV network, linking the LGV Sud-Est to Geneva. The reopened line has reduced journey times between Paris and Geneva due to both a shorter distance and higher speeds. The improved line now allows TGV trains to shorten their route to Geneva by 47 kilometres, reducing the Paris–Geneva journey time by about twenty minutes to just over three hours. In addition, the non-TGV services between Mâcon and Geneva via Bourg-en-Bresse and Bellegarde-sur-Valserine have been improved. Following completion, the project significantly increases freight capacity on the Ambérieu–Culoz section of the Lyon-Geneva line, as passenger trains use the Haut-Bugey line instead.

The upgraded line has been electrified at 25 kV 50 Hz AC, matching other high-speed lines in France. The right-of-way has been rebuilt, the infrastructure renovated, and many level crossings removed completely. A special effort has been made for environmental protection, particularly at the lakes of Nantua and Sylans, and to utilise rail noise screening.

A new station has been created at Nurieux-Volognat, near to the industrial basin of Oyonnax, and substantial works have taken place at Bellegarde-sur-Valserine, including building new tracks at the north-west end of the station (to allow trains from Geneva to turn onto the Haut-Bugey line without reversing), also new platforms for the Geneva-Paris TGV service and a new bus station with a car park.

Unusual engineering works on the line include the road-rail Cize-Bolozon viaduct, carrying the railway on the high level and the road on the low level and the overhead conductor rail used in the Bolozon I and Bolozon II tunnels and the open track in between. There are few examples of overhead conductor rails in France and this is the first at 25 kV.

Although the project is entirely in France, one third of the budget has been provided by Switzerland, owing to the expected benefit for Geneva. The project budget was €341 million, of which €23M is for the Bellegarde station and €318M for the line, funded by

- €214M, France: AFITF (Transport Infrastructure Finance Agency of France) and Réseau Ferré de France (RFF).
- €110M, Switzerland.
- €17.45M, Rhone-Alpes Région, Department of Ain, Department of Haute-Savoie, town of Bellegarde

In April 2009, RFF was reported to have postponed the opening of the line to September 2010, due to an unexpectedly harsh winter. Finally, commercial service began on 12 December 2010

== Description of the line ==
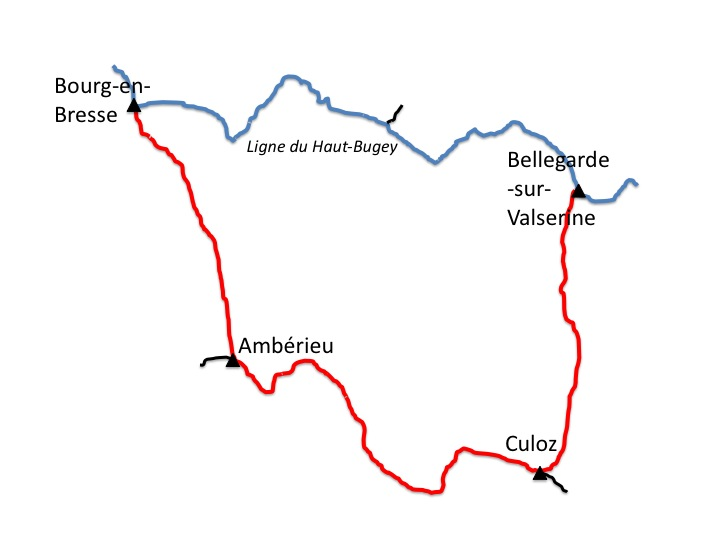
Diagram of the old route via Ambérieu and Culoz and the Haut-Bugey line

=== Route ===
The Haut-Bugey line links Bourg-en-Bresse to Bellegarde-sur-Valserine. Leaving Bourg-en-Bresse station, in the town centre, the line heads South through residential areas. It passes beneath the RN 75 via an underpass built as part of the renovation of the line, then the RN 79 by level crossing. A bridge carries the line over the A 40 motorway to the first slopes of the Revermont in the commune of Ceyzériat. The hilly nature of the terrain required the line to take a steep and sinuous course, crossing and recrossing the route départementale several times. After the villages of Villereversure and Simandre-sur-Suran the land flattens out. The Racouse tunnel takes the line through the second ridge of the Revermont, then the Cize-Bolozon viaduct crosses the river Ain to Bolozon station. Then comes a long climb up the slopes of Mont Berthiand culminating in the Mornay tunnel after which the line runs flat and straight to Nurieux-Volognat station. The line winds through the village of Port then along the south bank of the lake of Nantua to Nantua station. A short climb through le Neyrolles along the Sylans lake to the village of Charix, then plunges down the valley of the river Semine to Bellegarde.

Before the renovation there were 58 level crossings. In 2007 this number was reduced to 40, all of which were made automatic with warning lights and barriers.

At Bourg-en-Bresse, there are junctions with the Besançon - Bourg-en-Bresse line and the Mâcon - Ambérieu lines. At Montréal-la Cluse, the line to Andelot-en-Montagne branches off to the North. At Bellegarde-sur-Valserine, the line joins the Lyon- Geneva line.

=== Track construction ===
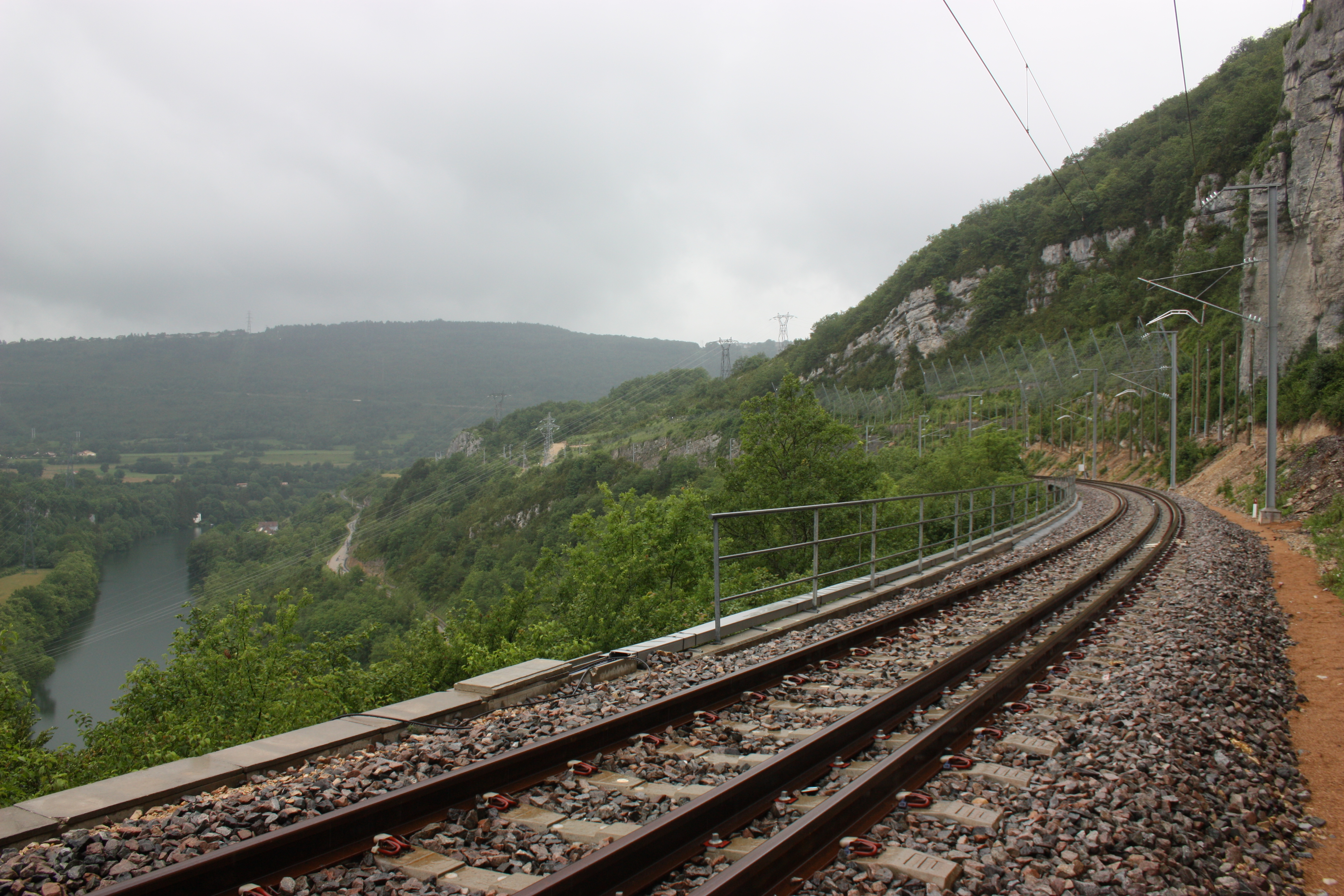
The line near Bolozon

On average, 1666 concrete sleepers were laid per kilometre. These are either monobloc, or bi-bloc depending on curve radius and specific characteristics of the location. In certain places, tropical hardwood sleepers are used. The rails were laid in 180m lengths and fixed to the rails using Pandrol's "fast-clip" system. The rails are welded continuously.

=== Profile ===
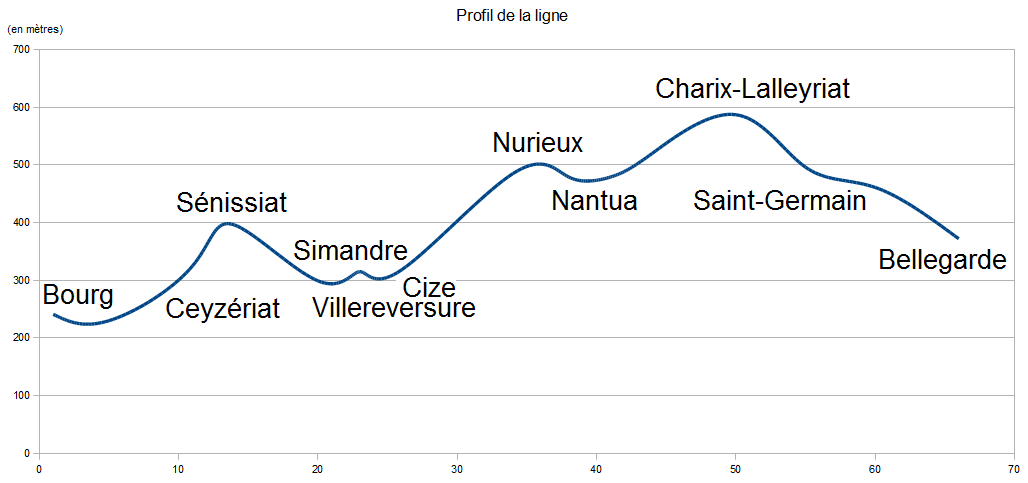
Profile of the line

The line goes through several geographically different sectors. After leaving the Bresse plain near Ceyzériat, the hilly nature of the Revermont and the Haut-Bugey requires tight curves (down to 300m radius, even 292m radius in the Bolozon 2 tunnel and Bellegarde station). The 347 m difference between the lowest point (altitude 240m in Bourg) and the highest (587m at Charix-Lalleyriat) also requires steep gradients (however, the steepest gradient, 35‰, on the line is not in the mountains, but the road underpass near Bourg station).

There are 10 tunnels along the 65 km route, now that the la Crotte tunnel has been converted to a cutting. Their total length is 7.3 km, the longest are Mornay (2589 m) and Racouze (1689 m).

=== Operating speeds ===
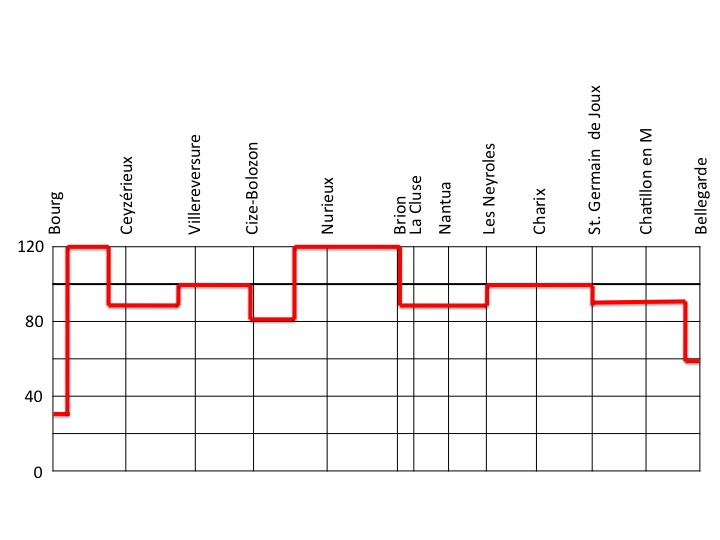
Haut bugey speed diagram

The first section between Bourg-en-Bresse and Ceyzériat is relatively flat and straight, allowing the maximum speed of 120 km/h. After Ceyzériat, there are tight curves and many level crossings, limiting the speed to 90 km/h. Crossing the Cize-Bolozon viaduct, the speed falls to 80 km/h, then picks up again to 90 through the Bolozon and Mornay tunnels. After that the limit rises to 120 km/h as far as Brion. The rest of the line is limited to 90 km/h except between les Neyrolles and Saint-Germain-de-Joux which can be taken at 100 km/h.

The passing loops have 60 km/h limits, except track three at Nurieux (reserved for local 'TER' trains) which is limited to 30 km/h and the turnout to Oyonnax which can be taken at 80 km/h.

Before the renovation, the speed limits were lower: 90 km/h between Bourg and Ceyzériat, then 80 km/h to Bolozon and finally 65 km/h to Bellegarde. All stations were limited to 30 km/h.

== Stations and halts ==
The Haut-Bugey line has had up to 14 stations along its 65 km length. The five first became operational on 10 March 1876. These were Bourg-en-Bresse, Ceyzériat, Sénissiat-Revonnas, Villereversure and Simandre-sur-Suran. Cize-Bolozon station, on the left bank of the river Ain just over the viaduct was opened 4 months later. The extension to La Cluse included the opening of Nurieux and La Cluse stations in 1877. The last six stations, were opened in 1882 and remained in service until 1990, when train services between La Cluse and Bellegarde were suspended. These were Nantua, Les Neyrolles, Charix-Lalleyriat, Saint-Germain-de-Joux, Châtillon-en-Michaille and Bellegarde-sur-Valserine.

In 1996, since all trains now had to reverse at La Cluse on their way from Bourg to Saint-Claude, La Cluse station was closed, and a new station Brion - Montréal-la-Cluse opened a few km to the west of La Cluse. A chord line was constructed allowing trains to proceed to Saint-Claude without reversing.

After the renovation works, eight stations have been retained. Three of these are served by TGV: Bourg-en-Bresse, Nurieux-Volognat and Bellegarde. The first two are also served by TER. At the re-opening of the line and as of May 2011, there are no plans to operate a TER train from Bellegarde to Bourg.

=== Gare de Bourg-en-Bresse ===
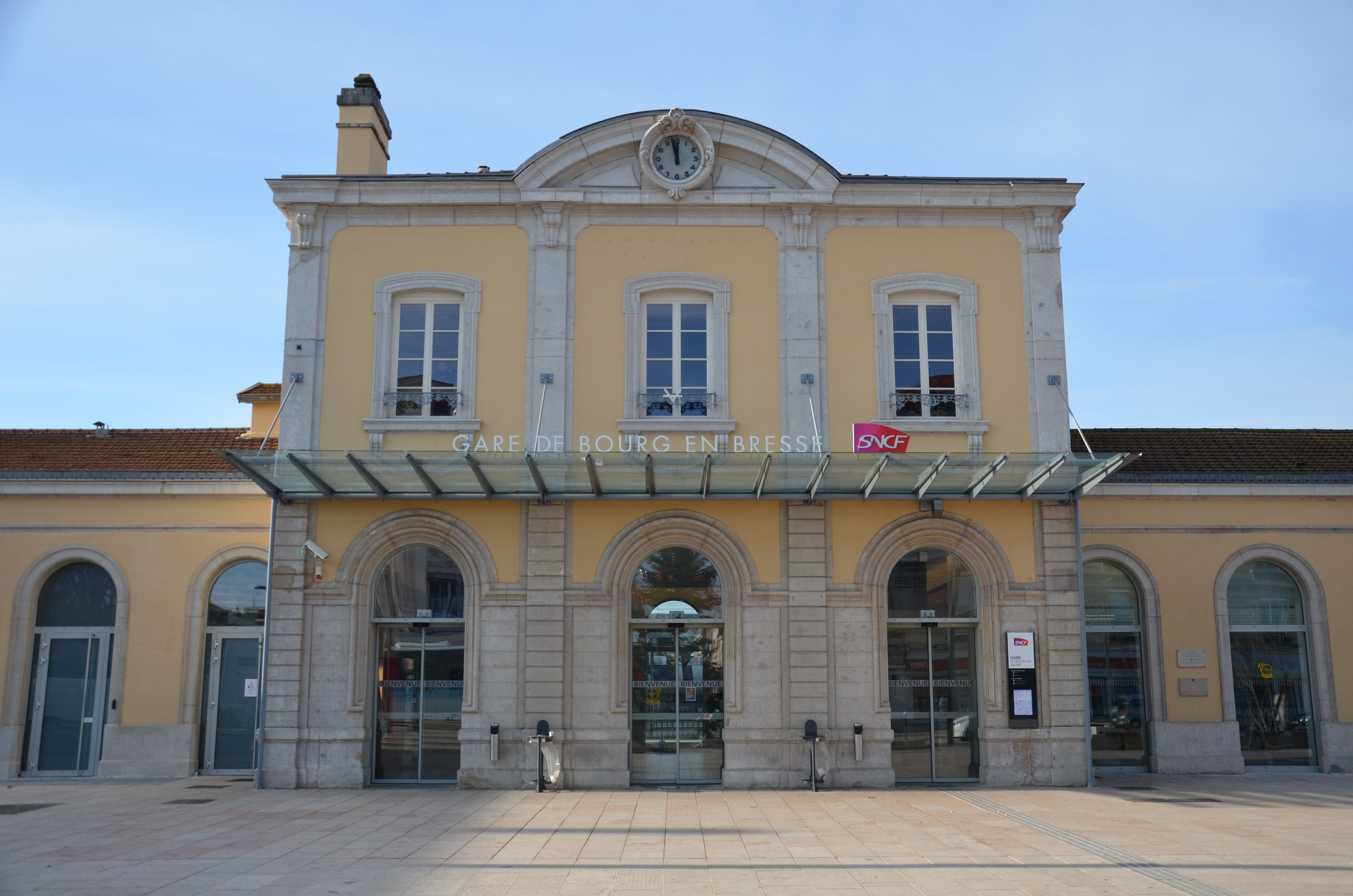
Facade

Bourg-en-Bresse station was opened on 1 September 1866. It is the starting point for the du Haut-Bugey line which was opened in 1876. Bourg is the administrative seat of the Ain département. The station is an important junction and consequently sees a lot of traffic. In addition to the Paris - Geneva TGV traffic using the Haut-Bugey line, there is long distance Corail traffic from Strasbourg to Marseille, Strasbourg to Lyon and several TER lines including the line from Bourg to Lyon through the Dombes.

=== Halte de Nurieux-Volognat ===
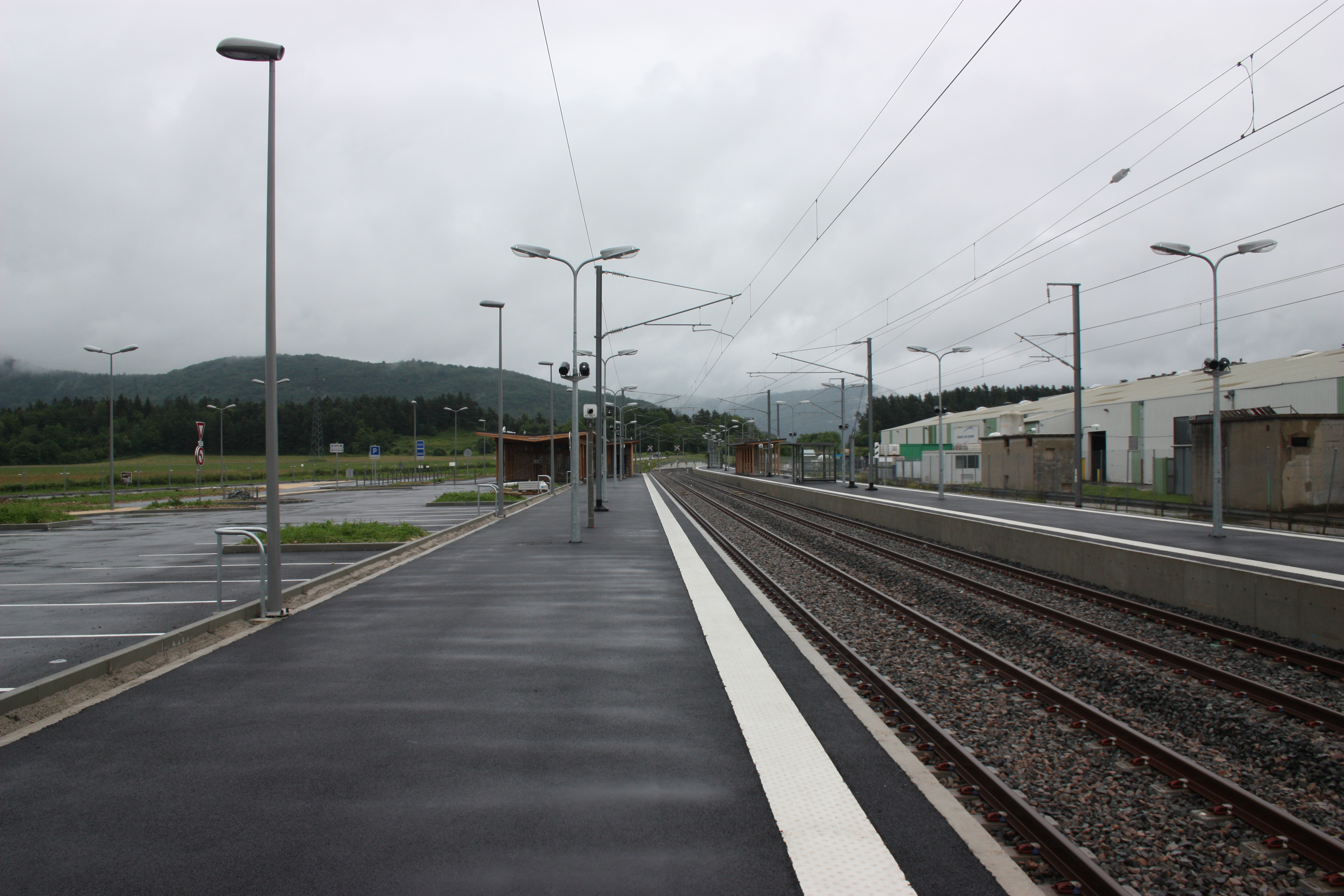
New platforms.

The Haut-Bugey project included construction of this new halt. In contrast to a station, a halte is not staffed and has only machines to sell tickets. Nurieux-Volognat, is close to the town of Oyonnax which sits at the heart of an industrial cluster specialising in plastics technology. There are over 550 companies with 12,000 employees in the trade. The only major transport link used to be the autoroute A 404 motorway.

=== Gare de Bellegarde-sur-Valserine ===
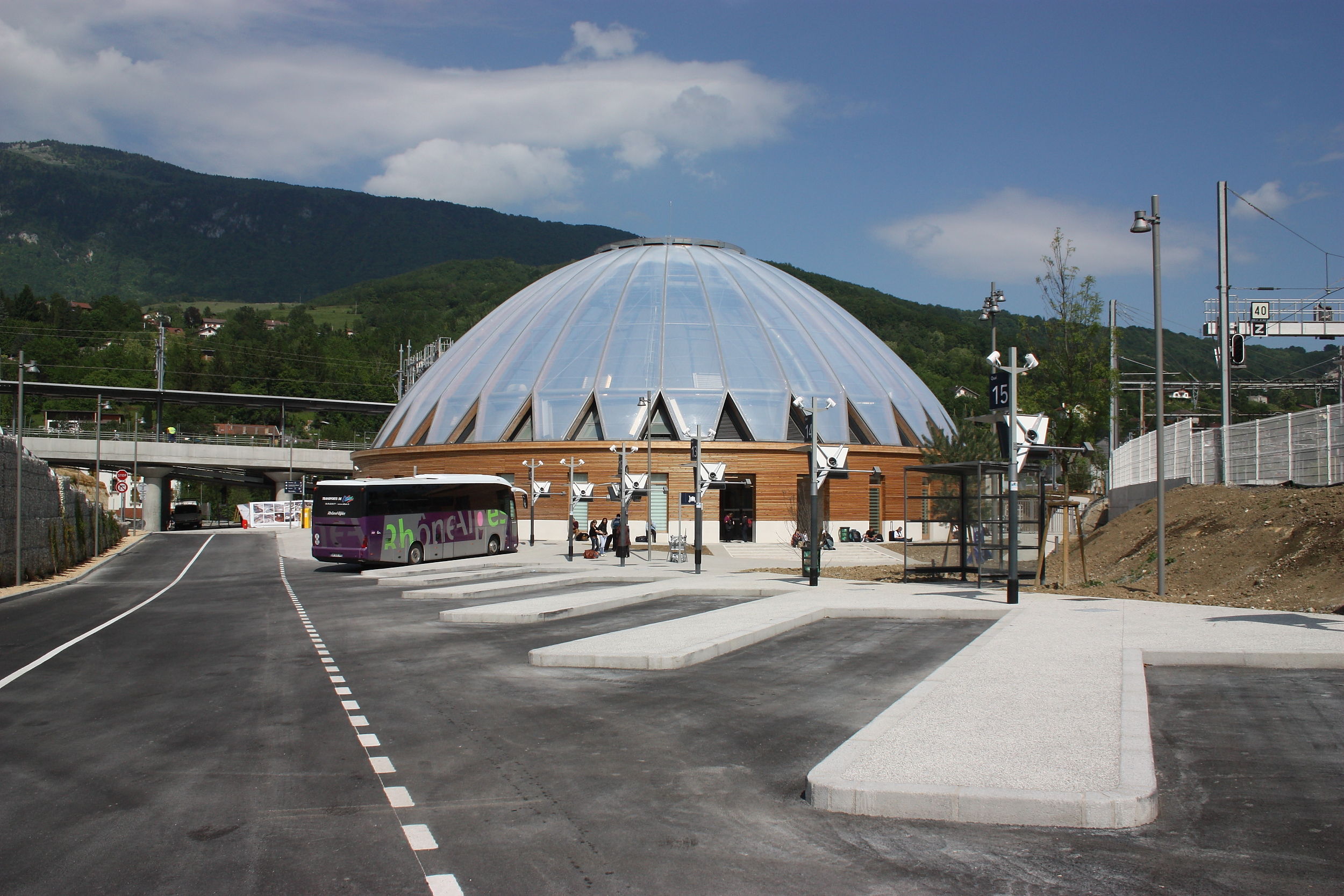
Gare de Bellegarde: 2010 station building

The Haut-Bugey line ends in Bellegarde. it was reached on 1 April 1882.

== Operations ==
=== Motive Power ===
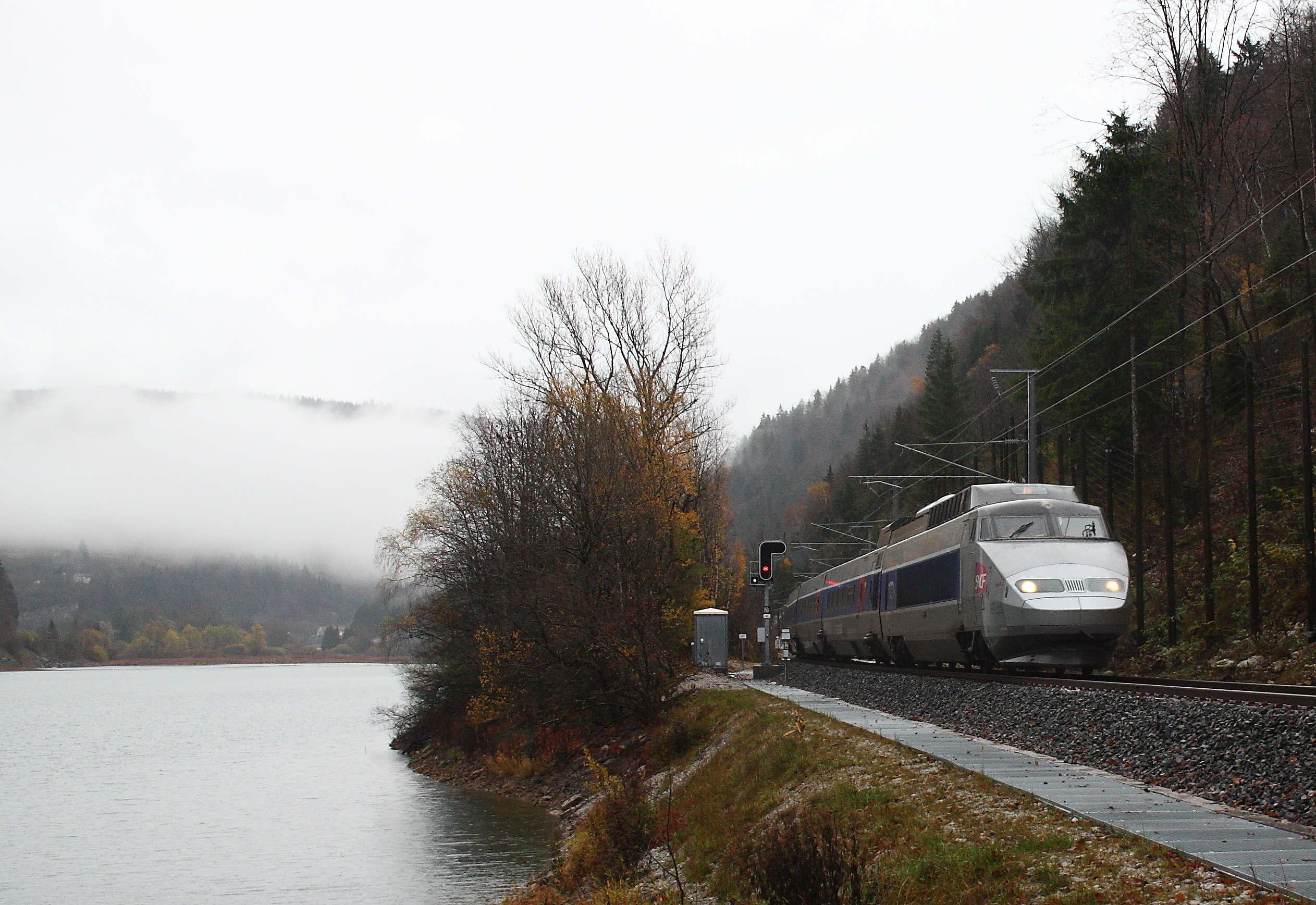
TGV Sud-Est by the lac de Sylans

Motive power began with steam, was replaced by diesel locomotives then diesel railcars before electrification brought the TGVs^{,}.

The DSE used 120-T and 030-T tank engines. Later in the 19th century, the PLM used 120 and 030 Bourbonnais, some of which were still in service in Bourg in 1950. But these locos were not powerful enough for the steep grade; most trains had to be double headed. Later and up until the second war, 140B, 140F, 230A came in. After the war 140L and 140J were used. The last was scrapped in 1961. The 141Rs so prevalent on the SNCF network, saw no service on the Haut-Bugey line as their axle weight was too heavy for the rails, although they did exceptionally run up to Nantua on trains unloading rubble from the Crêt d'Eau tunnel.

As of 1955, BB 63000 (ex 040-DE) were often to be found hauling both passenger and freight trains. Then came the BB 66000 (ex 040-DG) and finally the BB 67300 which handled freight services up to the mid-1990s.

There was also an abundance of diesel railcars, in particular first the ABJ, 90 hp FNC and X5500/5800 classes. Several different railcars were in service from the mid-1980s. The 300 hp X3800 series 'Picassos' ran from Bourg to Bellegarde until the 1980s and were then replaced by X2100s between La Cluse and Bellegarde. They could be found coupled to X2800 (a powerful 825 hp railcar designed to haul several carriages and operate on steep gradients). These railcars were still in service up to closure of the line. Occasionally, new generation X 73500 railcars were used to complement the X2800s.

There are some records of special trains. On 25 September 1983, a Trans-Europ-Panorama railtour made up of Rheingold coaches hauled by a BB 67000 and BB 66000 ran through from Bellegarde to Bourg. Three preservation railcars ran most of the rail tours in the 90s and up to 2005: X3943 "Bourg-Oyonnax", Agrivap's panoramic X-4208 and above all the X-4039 ABFC's 'Picasso' X4039 which ran for the last time from Bourg to Brion on 13 February 2005. X4208 came back for a VIP tour prior to the reopening on 2 June 2010.

Since the line was reopened, three multiple units are to be seen: TGV Sud-Est, TGV Duplex providing 9 rotations each day between Geneva and Paris (up from 7 per day before the reopening) and one diesel B 81500 providing the TER service from Bourg to Saint-Claude.

There has been talk of Eurostar opening services from London to Geneva and Thalys reopening the Brussels - Geneva service closed in 2003.

=== Journey times and services ===
The steep gradients and tight curves limited speeds throughout the history of line .

==== Pre 1973 ====
In 1932, eight trains ran each way, with a journey time of about 2h 30 for passenger trains. By 1952, the journey time had been shortened to 2 hours.

==== 1973 ====
In 1973, ten trains ran each way. Two trains ran the whole length of the line, departing at 5.50 and 7.39am from Bourg. They covered the 65 km in 1h 40, and average of 39 km/h including stops. Five trains only ran from Bourg to La Cluse (51 minutes, 41.5 km/h). Three trains ran from La Cluse to Bellegarde in 42 minutes. The last train terminated in La Cluse at 23.25. There were no night trains (although up till the mid-1960s, a night service ran from Paris-Gare de Lyon to Bellegarde).

==== 2005 ====
After the closure of the La Cluse - Bellegarde section in 1990, only the Bourg - Brion section was in service in 2005. On average there 7 trains per day of which only three stopped at all stations. The average journey time was 50 minutes, similar to that of 1973 for trains stopping at all stations

==== 2011 ====
The one and only daily service between Saint-Claude (Jura) and Bourg takes 44 minutes to cover the distance between Bourg and Brion, substantially higher than the 32 minutes which was suggested when the project was presented.

The TER service between Brion and Bellegarde is only provided by buses; no regional trains runs on this section any more.

The new journey times between Paris and Geneva (3h05 to 3h17, compared to 3h35 before the reopening were not well received in Switzerland, as sub 3h times had been planned. However the journey times are expected to fall when the Geneva - la Plaine and Bourg - Mâcon sections are upgraded.

== Gallery ==
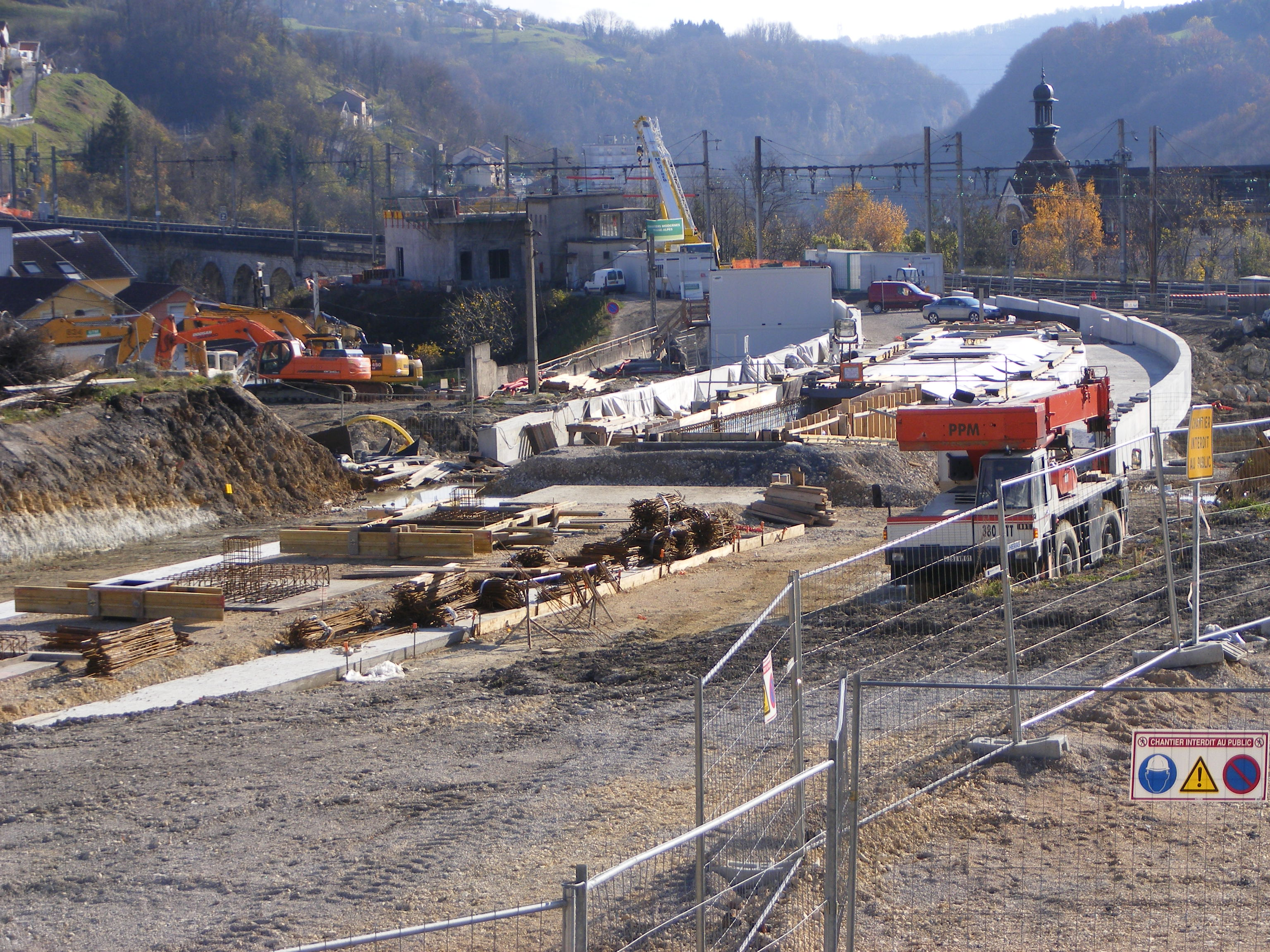
Construction at Bellegarde station: new tracks to allow trains to run from Geneva to Bourg without reversing

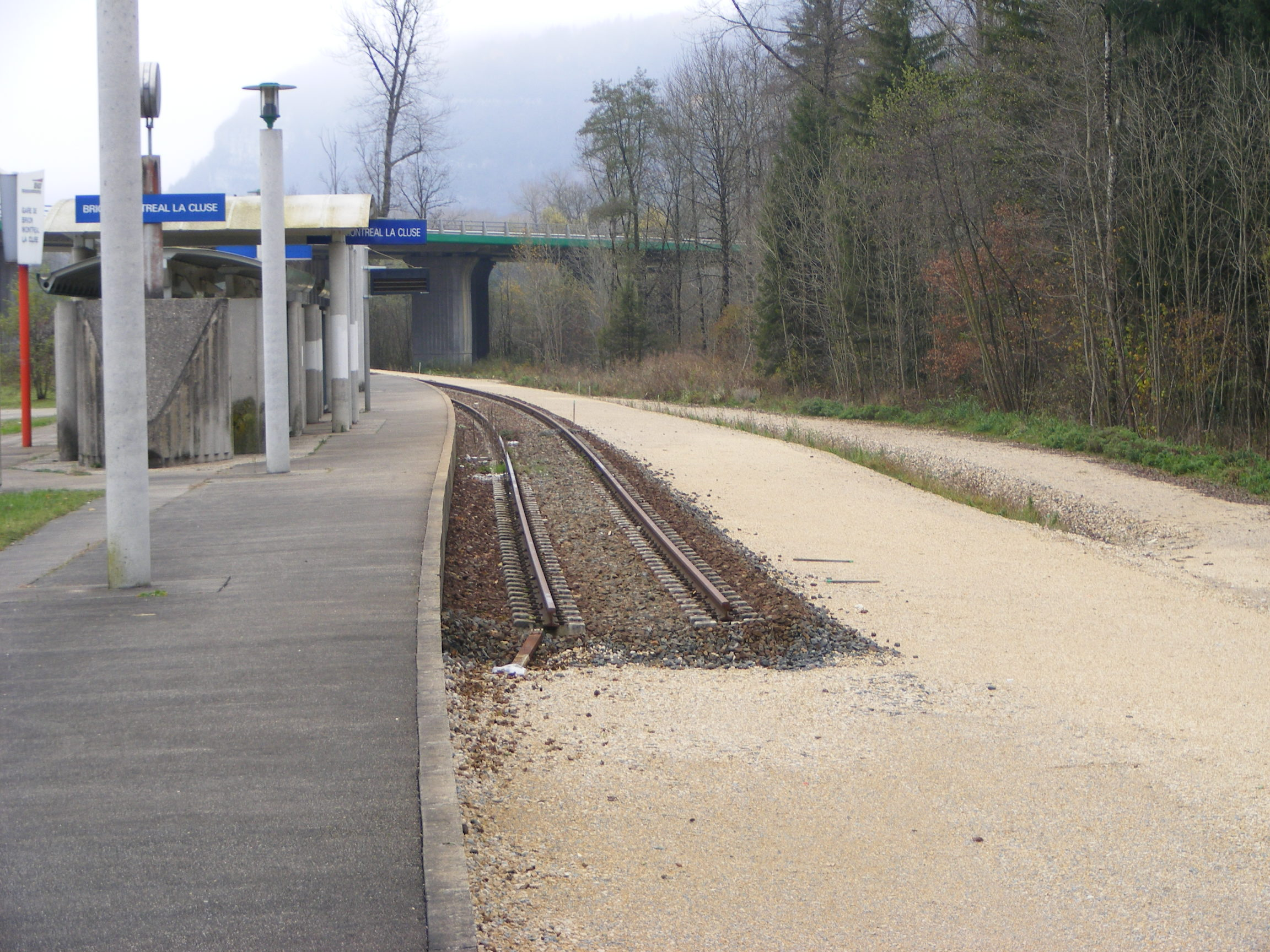
Brion Montreal la Cluse station, during reconstruction

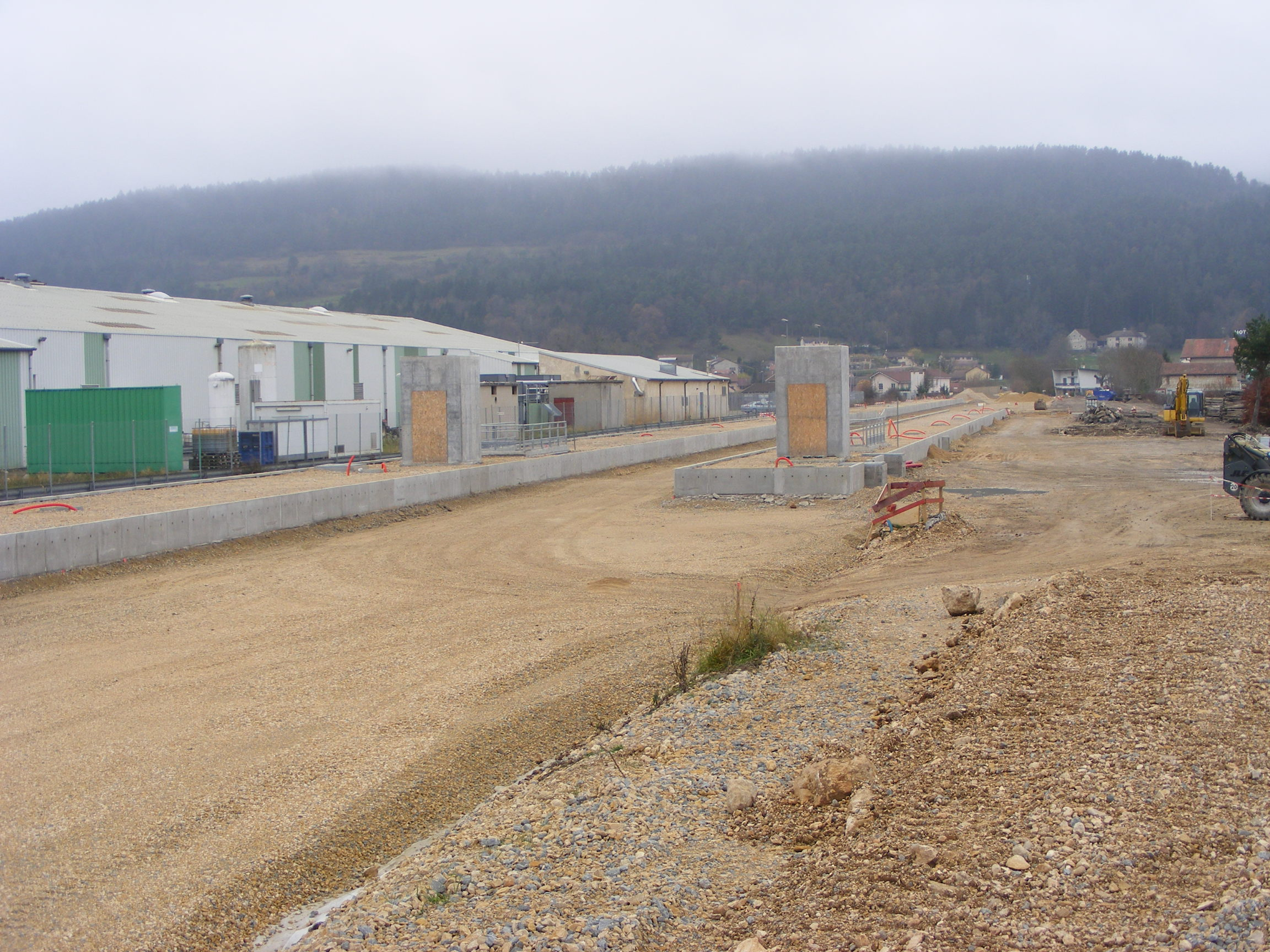
Construction at Nurieux-Volognat station

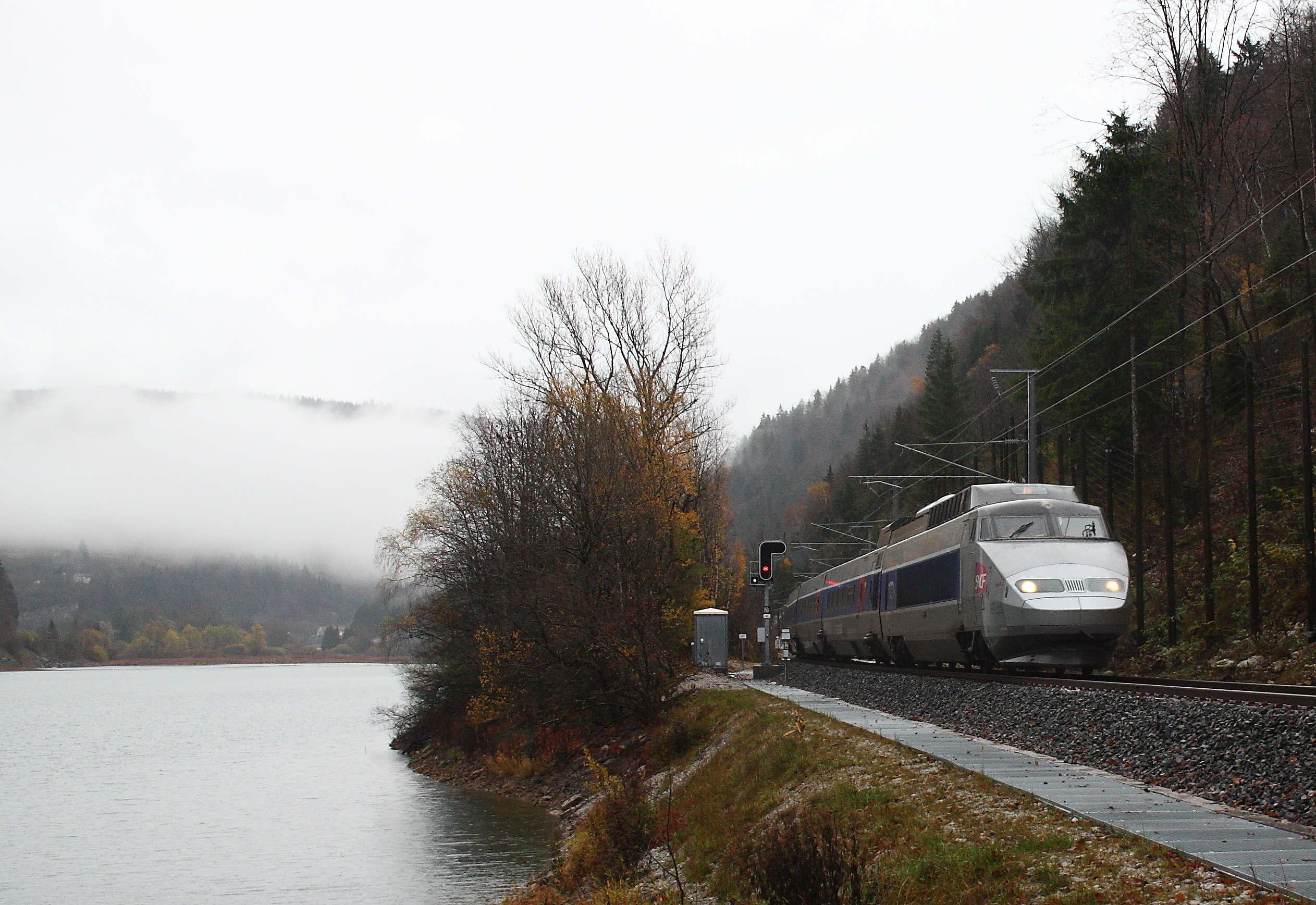
TGV Sud-Est running by the lac de Sylans

== Bibliography ==
- La Ligne du Haut Bugey (in French). 63670 La Roche-Blanche, France: La Regordane. October 2010. p. 208. ISBN 978-2-906984-90-5.
