= Bolozon =

Commune in Auvergne-Rhône-Alpes, France

- Commune
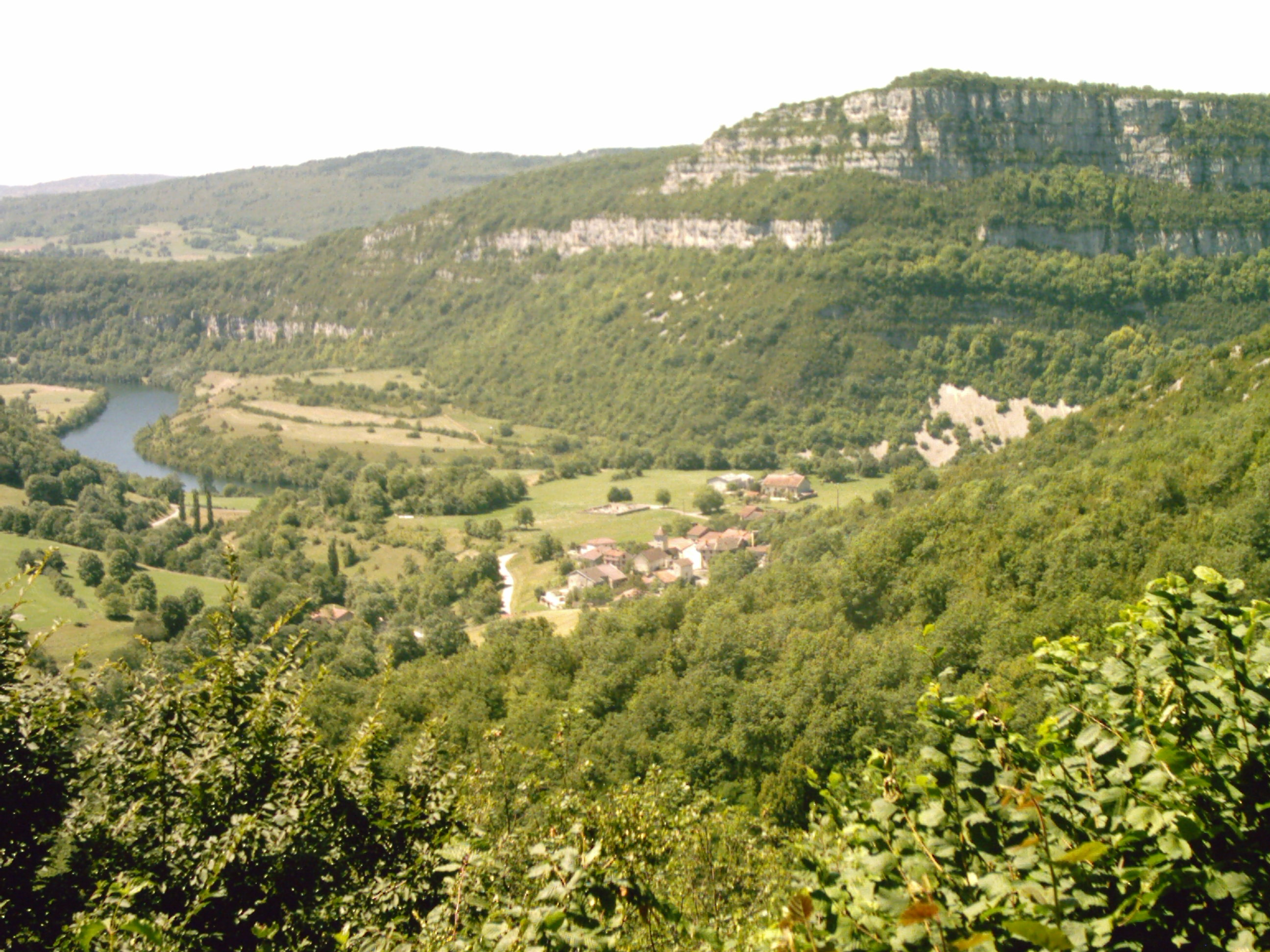
- Location of Bolozon
- Location within France Location within Auvergne-Rhône-Alpes
- Coordinates: 46°11′34″N 5°28′22″E
- Country: France
- Region: Auvergne-Rhône-Alpes
- Department: Ain
- Arrondissement: Nantua
- Canton: Pont-d'Ain
- Intercommunality: Haut-Bugey Agglomération

Government
  - Mayor (2026–32): Étienne Girod
- Area^{1}: 4.92 km^{2} (1.90 sq mi)
- Elevation: 318 m (1,043 ft)
- Highest elevation: 637 m (2,090 ft)
- Lowest elevation: 278 m (912 ft)
- Population (2023): 103
  - Density: 20.9/km^{2} (54.2/sq mi)
- Time zone: UTC+01:00 (CET)
  - Summer (DST): UTC+02:00 (CEST)
- INSEE/Postal code: 01051 /01450
- Website: https://bolozon.fr/
- ^{1} French Land Register data, which excludes lakes, ponds, glaciers > 1 km^{2} (0.386 sq mi or 247 acres) and river estuaries.

Bolozon (French pronunciation: [bɔlozɔ̃]) is a commune in the Ain department in eastern France. Cize—Bolozon station has rail connections to Bourg-en-Bresse and Oyonnax.

== Population ==
Historical population
Year	Pop.	±% p.a.
1968	112	—
1975	84	−4.03%
1982	94	+1.62%
1990	93	−0.13%
1999	94	+0.12%
2007	100	+0.78%
2012	91	−1.87%
2017	89	−0.44%
2023	103	+2.46%
Source: INSEE

== See also ==
- Communes of the Ain department
