= Oyonnax station =

Railway station in France

Oyonnax
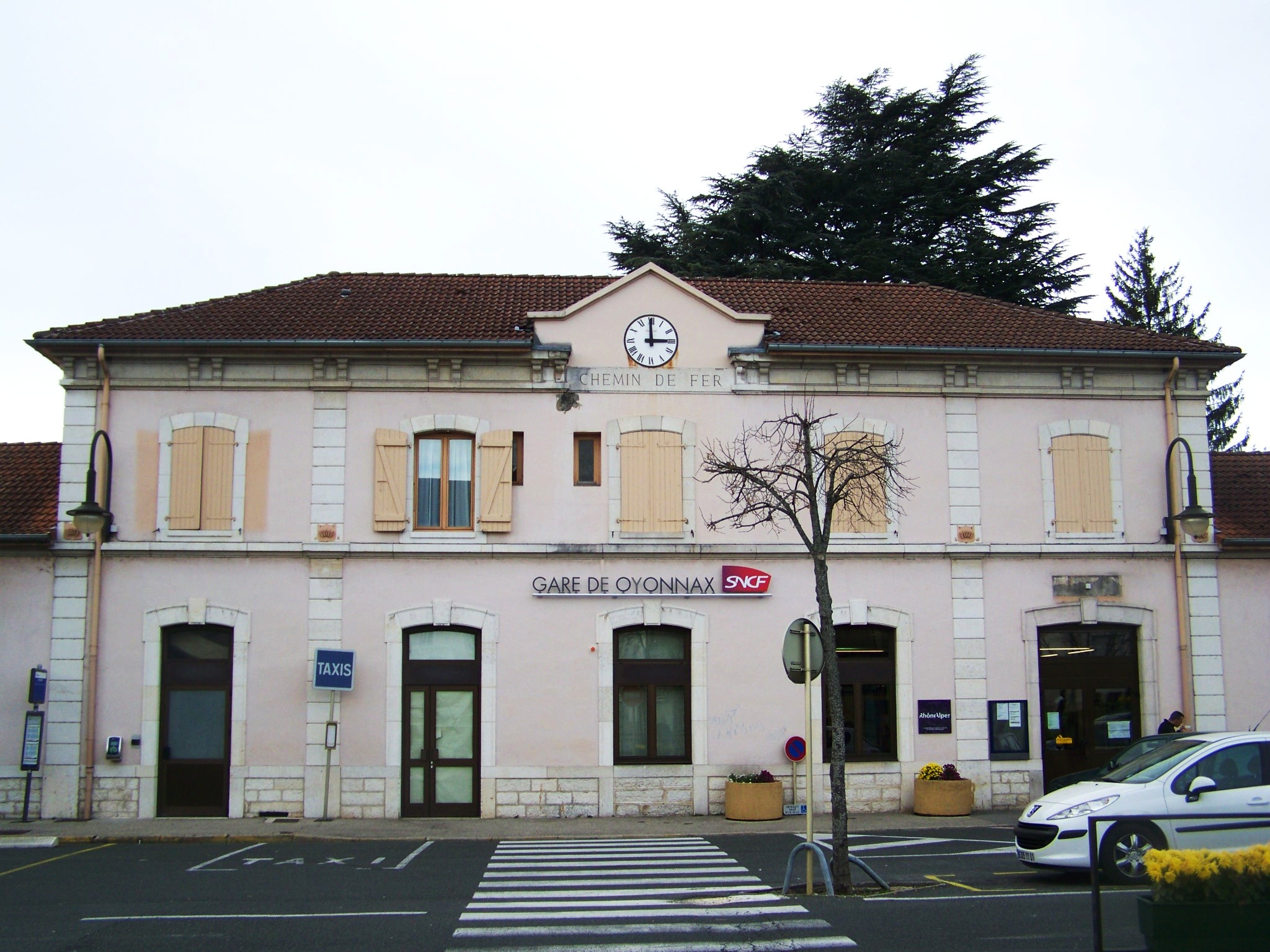
- The facade of the station building in November 2009

General information
- Location: Place Vaillant-Couturier; 01100 Oyonnax; Ain; France
- Coordinates: 46°15′35″N 5°39′11″E
- Owner: SNCF
- Operator: SNCF
- Platforms: 2
- Tracks: 2

History
- Opened: 17 May 1885

Passengers
- 2019: 102,677

Services
Preceding station	TER Auvergne-Rhône-Alpes	Following station
Bellignat towards Bourg-en-Bresse	31	Terminus
Location

Oyonnax station (French: Gare d'Oyonnax) is a railway station served by TER Auvergne-Rhône-Alpes. It serves the town of Oyonnax, and is located in the department of Ain. The station is located on the line between Andelot-en-Montagne and La Cluse.

== History ==
Approval to construct a station at the current site was given by a ministerial decision date 17 November 1880. Construction took place between 28 March 1883 and 16 May 1885, and the station was opened by the Minister of Public Works on 17 May 1885.

Work on the Ligne du Haut-Bugey has caused buses to replace trains between Bourg-en-Bresse and Oyonnax from 2005 to December 2012.

== Services ==
The following services serve the station as of 2022:

- regional trains Lyon - Bourg-en-Bresse - Brion-Montréal-la-Cluse - Oyonnax
- regional buses to Saint-Claude, Nantua and Bourg-en-Bresse

== See also ==
- List of SNCF stations in Auvergne-Rhône-Alpes
