= Simandre-sur-Suran =

Commune in Auvergne-Rhône-Alpes, France

- Commune
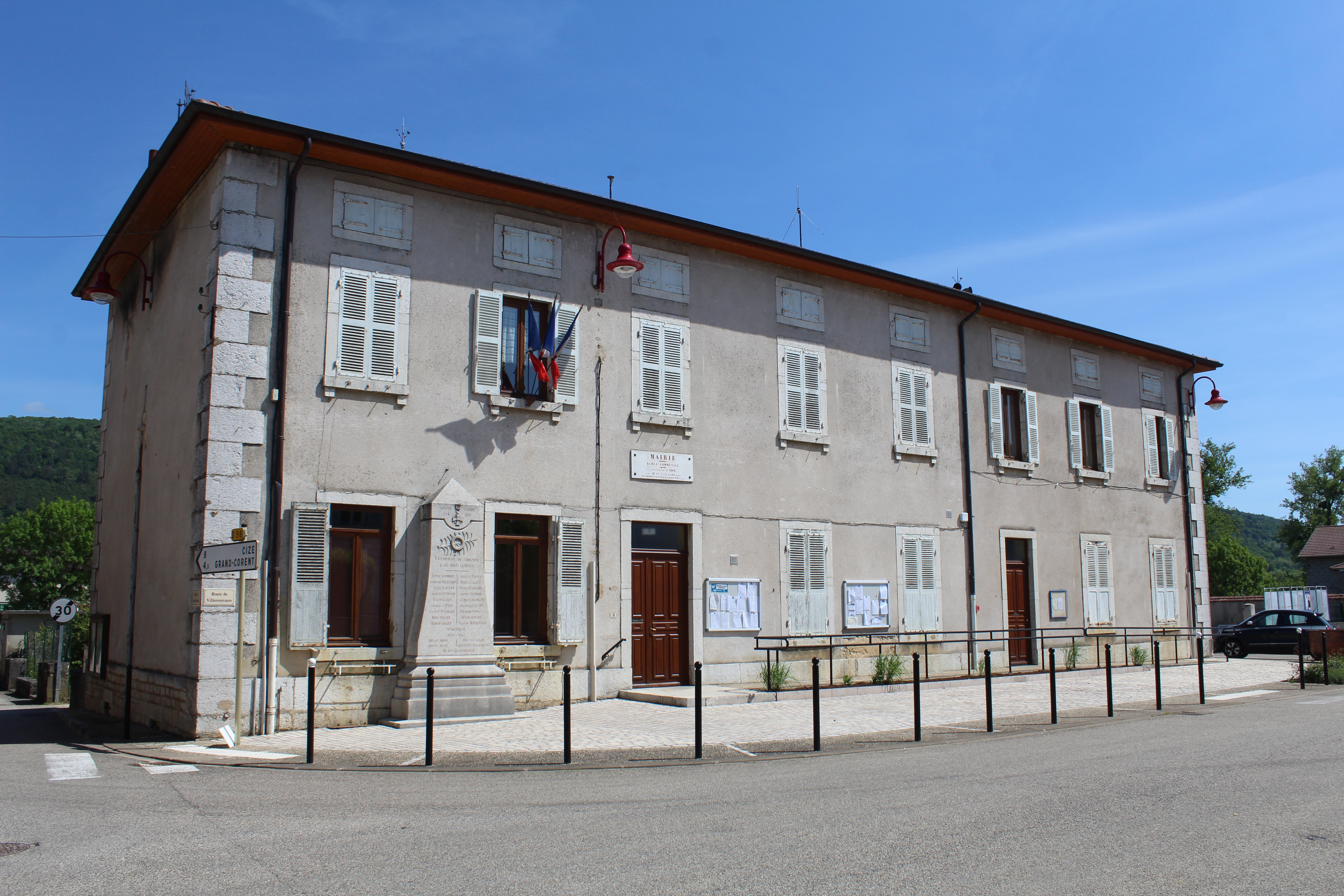
- Town hall
- Location of Simandre-sur-Suran
- Location within France Location within Auvergne-Rhône-Alpes
- Coordinates: 46°13′34″N 5°25′04″E
- Country: France
- Region: Auvergne-Rhône-Alpes
- Department: Ain
- Arrondissement: Bourg-en-Bresse
- Canton: Saint-Étienne-du-Bois
- Intercommunality: CA Bassin de Bourg-en-Bresse

Government
  - Mayor (2026–32): Philippe Jeannin
- Area^{1}: 16.3 km^{2} (6.3 sq mi)
- Elevation: 307 m (1,007 ft)
- Highest elevation: 644 m (2,113 ft)
- Lowest elevation: 296 m (971 ft)
- Population (2023): 673
  - Density: 41.3/km^{2} (107/sq mi)
- Time zone: UTC+01:00 (CET)
  - Summer (DST): UTC+02:00 (CEST)
- INSEE/Postal code: 01408 /01250
- ^{1} French Land Register data, which excludes lakes, ponds, glaciers > 1 km^{2} (0.386 sq mi or 247 acres) and river estuaries.

Simandre-sur-Suran (French pronunciation: [simɑ̃dʁ syʁ syʁɑ̃], before 1994: Simandre) is a commune in the Ain department in eastern France.

== Population ==
Historical population
Year	Pop.	±% p.a.
1968	445	—
1975	402	−1.44%
1982	500	+3.17%
1990	574	+1.74%
1999	638	+1.18%
2007	654	+0.31%
2012	679	+0.75%
2017	671	−0.24%
2023	673	+0.05%
Source: INSEE

== Religion ==
The Sélignac Charterhouse, located near Simandre sur Suran, has been converted into a house in which lay people can come to experience Carthusian retreats, living the Carthusian monastic life for a short period.

== See also ==
- Communes of the Ain department
