= Zimeysa railway station =

Railway station in Meyrin, Switzerland

Zimeysa
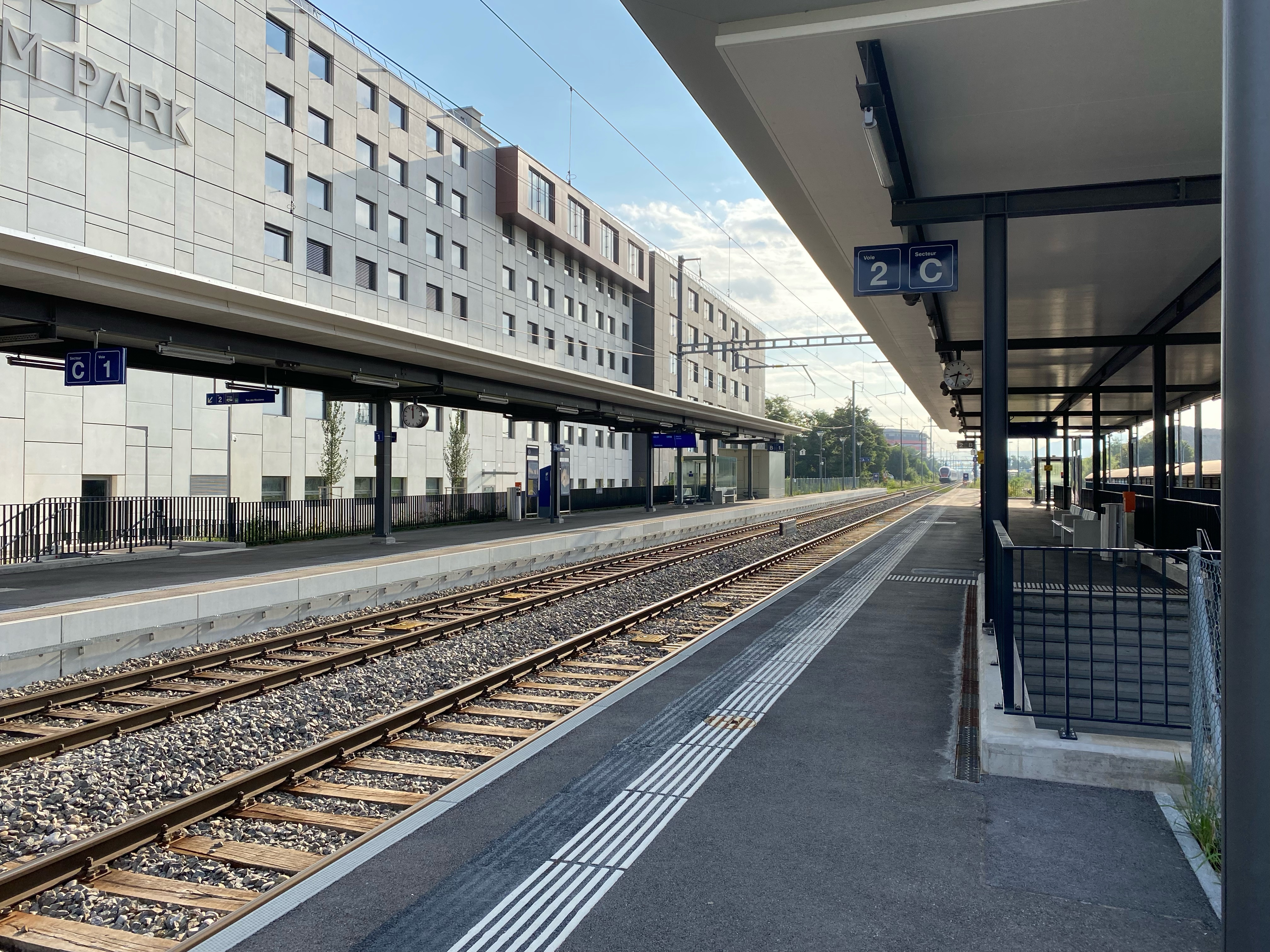
- The station platforms in 2021

General information
- Location: Meyrin; Switzerland
- Coordinates: 46°13′16″N 6°03′58″E
- Elevation: 429 m (1,407 ft)
- Owner: Swiss Federal Railways
- Line: Lyon–Geneva line
- Distance: 67.0 km (41.6 mi) from Lausanne
- Platforms: 2 side platforms
- Tracks: 2
- Train operators: Swiss Federal Railways
- Connections: tpg
- Bus: bus lines

Construction
- Cycle facilities: Yes (12 spaces)
- Accessible: Yes

Other information
- Station code: 8501000 (ZIM)
- Fare zone: 10 (unireso)

History
- Opened: 1 June 1987

Passengers
- 2023: 2'300 per weekday (SBB)

Services
Preceding station	Léman Express	Following station
Satigny towards La Plaine	L5	Meyrin towards Genève-Cornavin
Satigny towards Bellegarde	L6	Meyrin towards Genève-Cornavin
Location
- Location within Switzerland Location within Canton of Geneva

Zimeysa railway station (French: Gare de Zimeysa) is a railway station in the municipality of Meyrin, in the Swiss canton of Geneva. It is an intermediate stop on the standard gauge Lyon–Geneva line of Swiss Federal Railways.

== Services ==
As of the December 2024 timetable change, the following services stop at Zimeysa:

- Léman Express:
  - L5: half-hourly service between La Plaine and Genève-Cornavin.
  - L6: rush-hour service between Bellegarde and Genève-Cornavin.
