= Meyrin railway station =

Railway station in Meyrin, Switzerland

Meyrin
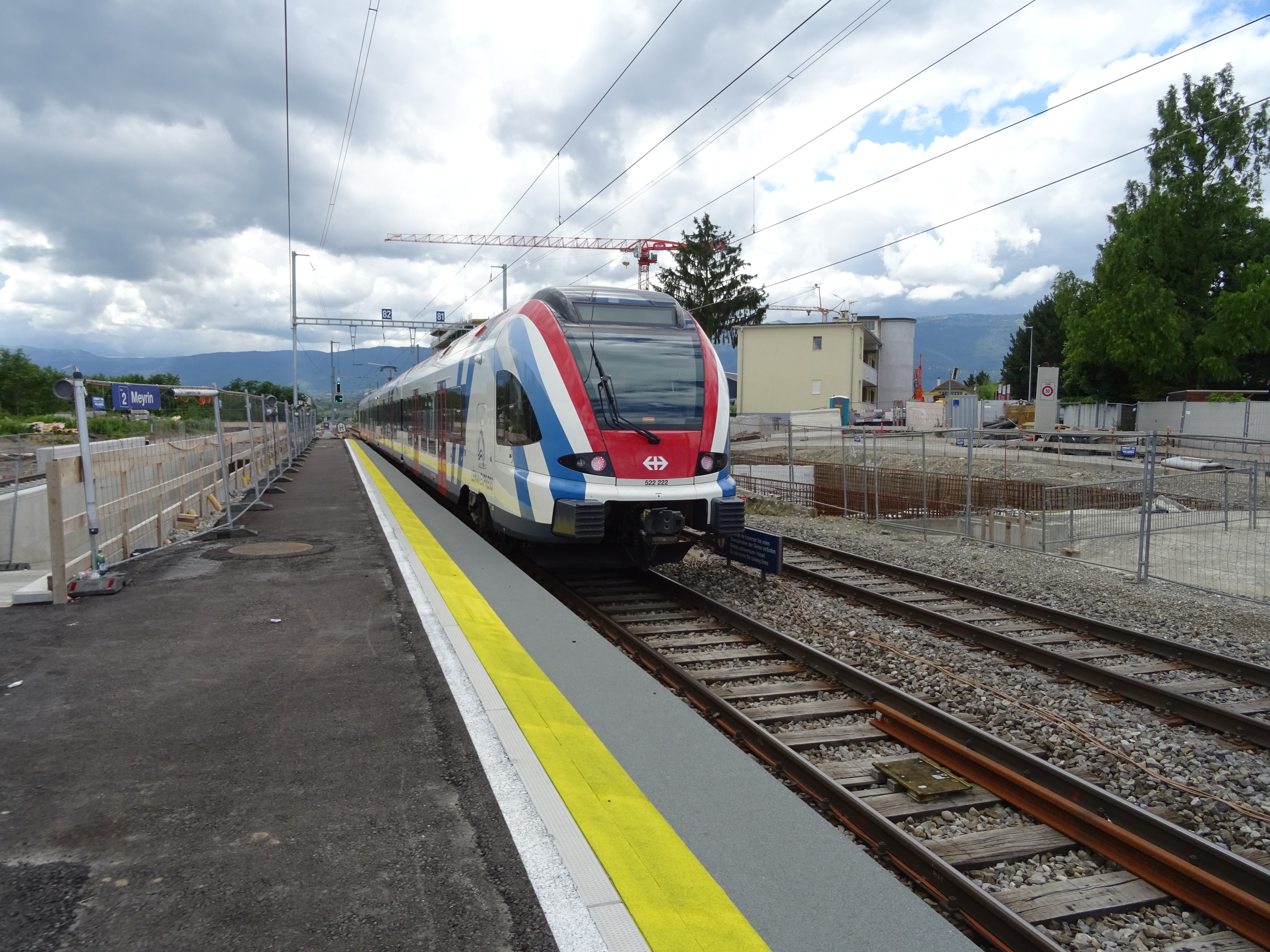
- A Léman Express L5 train at the station in 2020

General information
- Location: Meyrin; Switzerland
- Coordinates: 46°13′20″N 6°04′37″E
- Elevation: 433 m (1,421 ft)
- Owner: Swiss Federal Railways
- Line: Lyon–Geneva line
- Distance: 66.1 km (41.1 mi) from Lausanne
- Platforms: 2 side platforms
- Tracks: 2
- Train operators: Swiss Federal Railways
- Connections: tpg
- Bus: bus lines

Construction
- Cycle facilities: Yes (24 spaces)
- Accessible: Yes

Other information
- Station code: 8501006 (VM)
- Fare zone: 10 (unireso)

History
- Opened: 16 March 1858
- Former names: Vernier-Meyrin

Passengers
- 2023: 960 per weekday (SBB)

Services
Preceding station	Léman Express	Following station
Zimeysa towards La Plaine	L5	Vernier towards Genève-Cornavin
Zimeysa towards Bellegarde	L6	Vernier towards Genève-Cornavin
Location
- Location within Switzerland Location within Canton of Geneva

Meyrin railway station (French: Gare de Meyrin), formerly known as Vernier-Meyrin, is a railway station in the municipality of Meyrin, in the Swiss canton of Geneva. It is an intermediate stop on the standard gauge Lyon–Geneva line of Swiss Federal Railways.

== Services ==
As of the December 2024 timetable change, the following services stop at Meyrin:

- Léman Express:
  - L5: half-hourly service between La Plaine and Genève-Cornavin.
  - L6: rush-hour service between Bellegarde and Genève-Cornavin.
