= Satigny railway station =

Railway station in Satigny, Switzerland

Satigny
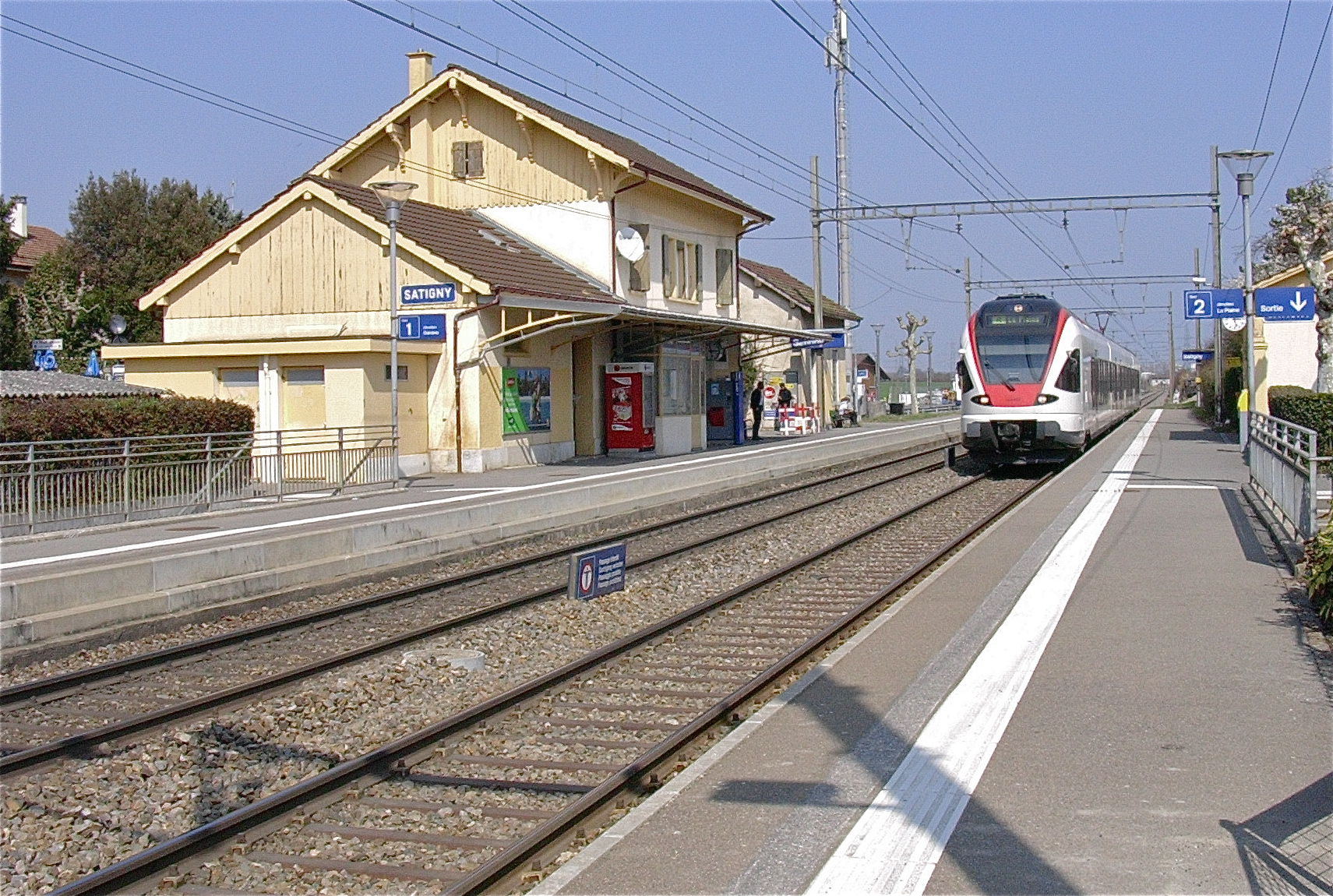
- The station in 2012

General information
- Location: Satigny; Switzerland
- Coordinates: 46°12′51″N 6°02′16″E
- Elevation: 414 m (1,358 ft)
- Owner: Swiss Federal Railways
- Line: Lyon–Geneva line
- Distance: 69.4 km (43.1 mi) from Lausanne
- Platforms: 2 side platforms
- Tracks: 2
- Train operators: Swiss Federal Railways
- Connections: tpg
- Bus: bus lines

Construction
- Parking: Yes (92 spaces)
- Cycle facilities: Yes (18 spaces)
- Accessible: Yes

Other information
- Station code: 8501003 (SY)
- Fare zone: 10 (unireso)

History
- Opened: 16 March 1858

Passengers
- 2023: 2'500 per weekday (SBB)

Services
| Preceding station | Léman Express | Following station |
|---|---|---|
| Russin towards La Plaine | L5 | Zimeysa towards Genève-Cornavin |
| Russin towards Bellegarde | L6 | Zimeysa towards Genève-Cornavin |
Location
- Location within Switzerland Location within Canton of Geneva

Satigny railway station (French: Gare de Satigny) is a railway station in the municipality of Satigny, in the Swiss canton of Geneva. It is an intermediate stop on the standard gauge Lyon–Geneva line of Swiss Federal Railways.

== Services ==
As of the December 2024 timetable change, the following services stop at Satigny:

- Léman Express:
  - L5: half-hourly service between La Plaine and Genève-Cornavin.
  - L6: rush-hour service between Bellegarde and Genève-Cornavin.
