= Vernier railway station =

Railway station in Vernier, Switzerland

Vernier
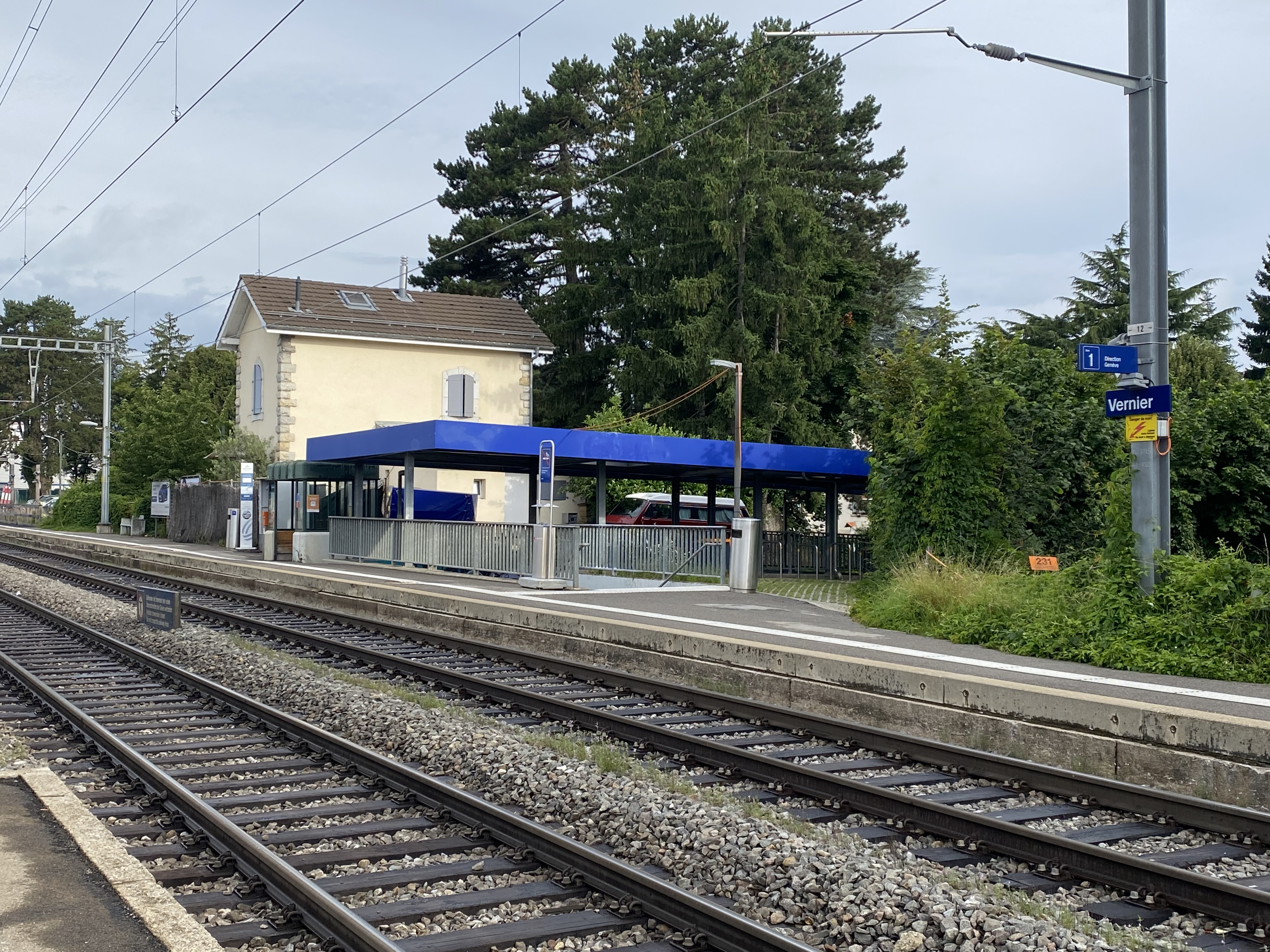
- Railway platform towards La Plaine, before the overhaul

General information
- Location: Vernier; Switzerland
- Coordinates: 46°13′15″N 6°05′38″E
- Elevation: 428 m (1,404 ft)
- Owner: Swiss Federal Railways
- Line: Lyon–Geneva line
- Distance: 64.8 km (40.3 mi) from Lausanne
- Platforms: 2 side platforms
- Tracks: 2
- Train operators: Swiss Federal Railways
- Connections: tpg : gare/Croisette, gare/Renfile
- Trolleybus: trolleybus lines
- Bus: bus lines

Construction
- Parking: Yes (81 spaces)
- Cycle facilities: Yes (22 spaces)
- Accessible: Yes

Other information
- Station code: 8501007 (COI)
- Fare zone: 10 (unireso)

History
- Opened: 16 March 1858
- Former names: Cointrin (until 2011)

Passengers
- 2023: 1'400 per weekday (SBB)

Services
Preceding station	Léman Express	Following station
Meyrin towards La Plaine	L5	Genève-Cornavin Terminus
Meyrin towards Bellegarde	L6	Genève-Cornavin Terminus
Terminus	L7	Lancy-Pont-Rouge towards Annemasse
Location
- Location within Switzerland Location within Canton of Geneva

Vernier railway station (French: Gare de Vernier), formerly known as Cointrin, is a railway station in the municipality of Vernier, in the Swiss canton of Geneva. It is an intermediate stop on the standard gauge Lyon–Geneva line of Swiss Federal Railways.

== Services ==
As of the December 2025 timetable change, the following services stop at Vernier:

- Léman Express:
  - L5: half-hourly service between La Plaine and Genève-Cornavin
  - L6: rush-hour service between Bellegarde and Genève-Cornavin
  - L7: rush-hour service to Annemasse via Lancy-Pont-Rouge
