= Pougny–Chancy station =

Railway station in Pougny, France

Pougny–Chancy
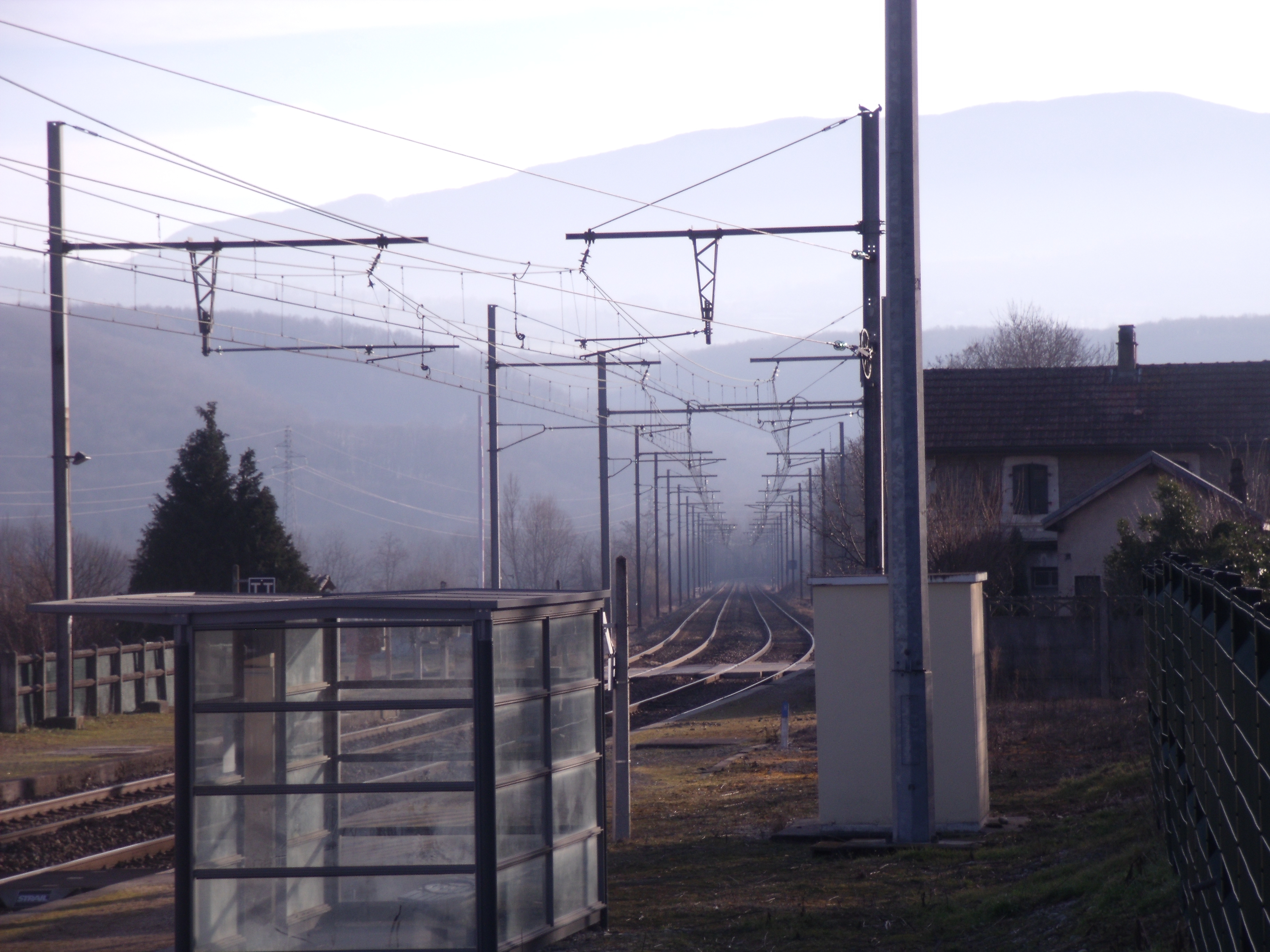
- Looking toward Lyon from the station in 2011

General information
- Location: Route de la Gare; 01550 Pougny; Ain; France
- Coordinates: 46°08′41″N 5°57′41″E
- Elevation: 356 m (1,168 ft)
- Owner: SNCF
- Operator: SNCF
- Line: Lyon–Geneva line
- Platforms: 2 side platforms
- Tracks: 2
- Train operators: Swiss Federal Railways
- Connections: tpg bus line

Construction
- Accessible: No

Other information
- Station code: 87745380
- Fare zone: 240 (unireso)

History
- Opened: 16 March 1858

Passengers
- 2023: 3,133

Services
Preceding station	Léman Express	Following station
Bellegarde Terminus	L6	Russin towards Genève-Cornavin
Location

Pougny–Chancy station (French: Gare de Pougny–Chancy) is a railway station in the commune of Pougny, in the French department of Ain in the Auvergne-Rhône-Alpes region. The station is an intermediate stop on the Lyon–Geneva line of SNCF and serves, besides Pougny, also the village of Chancy in the Swiss canton of Geneva. Chancy is located across the Rhône, which forms the France–Switzerland border.

== Services ==
As of the December 2024 timetable change, the following regional train services stop at Pougny—Chancy:

- Léman Express L6: rush-hour service between Bellegarde and Genève-Cornavin.

== See also ==
- List of SNCF stations in Auvergne-Rhône-Alpes
- Rail transport in France
