= Russin railway station =

Railway station in Russin, Switzerland

Russin
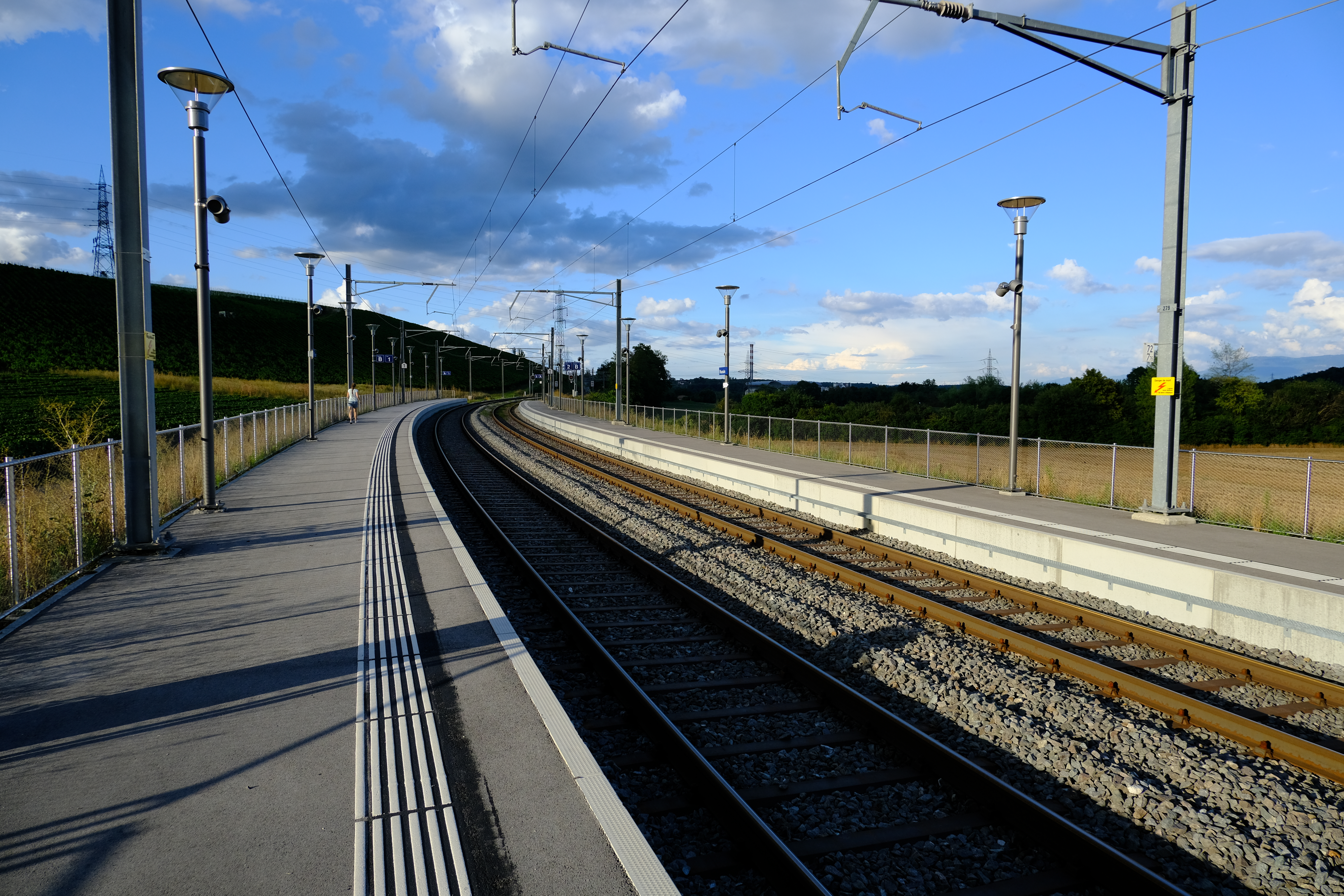
- The station in 2020

General information
- Location: Russin; Switzerland
- Coordinates: 46°11′17″N 6°01′05″E
- Elevation: 377 m (1,237 ft)
- Owner: Swiss Federal Railways
- Line: Lyon–Geneva line
- Distance: 72.8 km (45.2 mi) from Lausanne
- Platforms: 2 side platforms
- Tracks: 2
- Train operators: Swiss Federal Railways

Construction
- Accessible: Yes

Other information
- Station code: 8501002 (RUS)
- Fare zone: 10 (unireso)

History
- Opened: 16 March 1858

Passengers
- 2023: 270 per weekday (SBB)

Services
Preceding station	Léman Express	Following station
La Plaine Terminus	L5	Satigny towards Genève-Cornavin
Pougny—Chancy towards Bellegarde	L6	Satigny towards Genève-Cornavin
Location
- Location within Switzerland Location within Canton of Geneva

Russin railway station (French: Gare de Russin) is a railway station in the municipality of Russin, in the Swiss canton of Geneva. It is an intermediate stop on the standard gauge Lyon–Geneva line of Swiss Federal Railways.

== Services ==
As of the December 2024 timetable change, the following services stop at Russin:

- Léman Express:
  - L5: half-hourly service between La Plaine and Genève-Cornavin.
  - L6: rush-hour service between Bellegarde and Genève-Cornavin.
