= La Plaine railway station =

Railway station in Dardagny, Switzerland

La Plaine
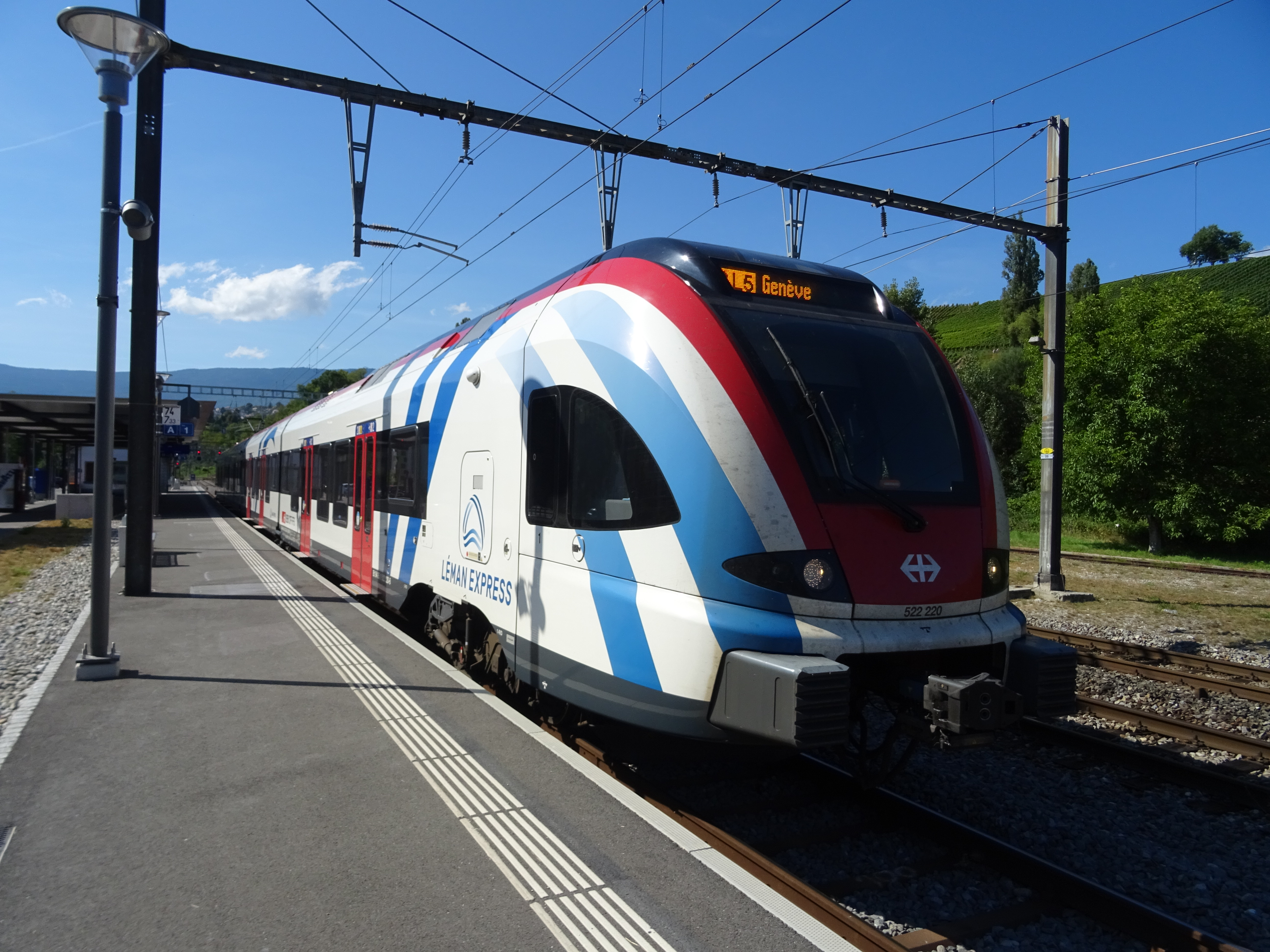
- The station platform in 2021

General information
- Location: Dardagny; Switzerland
- Coordinates: 46°10′43″N 6°00′00″E
- Elevation: 355 m (1,165 ft)
- Owner: Swiss Federal Railways
- Line: Lyon–Geneva line
- Distance: 74.8 km (46.5 mi) from Lausanne
- Platforms: 1 side platform
- Tracks: 3
- Train operators: Swiss Federal Railways
- Connections: tpg
- Bus: bus lines

Construction
- Parking: Yes (84 spaces)
- Cycle facilities: Yes (43 spaces)
- Accessible: Yes

Other information
- Station code: 8501001 (LP)
- Fare zone: 10 (unireso)

History
- Opened: 16 March 1858

Passengers
- 2023: 1'900 per weekday (SBB)

Services
Preceding station	Léman Express	Following station
Terminus	L5	Russin towards Genève-Cornavin
Location
- Location within Switzerland Location within Canton of Geneva

La Plaine railway station (French: Gare de La Plaine) is a railway station in the municipality of Dardagny, in the Swiss canton of Geneva. It is an intermediate stop on the standard gauge Lyon–Geneva line of Swiss Federal Railways.

== Services ==
As of the December 2024 timetable change, the following services stop at La Plaine:

- Léman Express L5: half-hourly service to Genève-Cornavin.
