= Buses in Geneva =

Bus services in Geneva, Switzerland

Geneva Bus

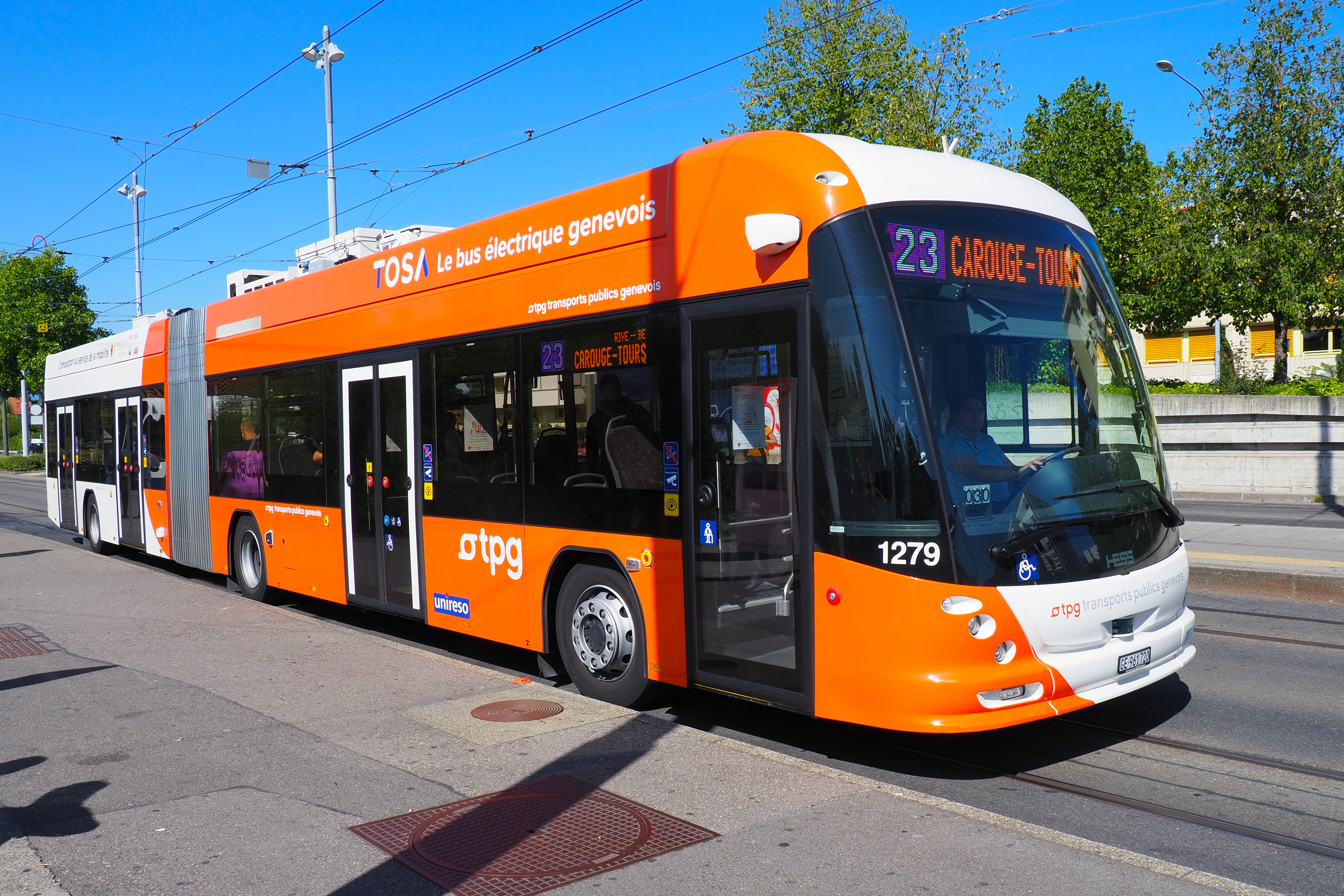
- A TOSA bus in August 2018
- Commenced operation: September 10, 1928; 97 years ago
- Locale: Metropolitan Geneva region
- Service area: Geneva, Switzerland
- Service type: Bus
- Routes: 59
- Stops: 870 (2026; entire tpg network)
- Fleet: 243 buses (2025)
- Annual ridership: 99.945 million (2025)
- Fuel type: Diesel, Electric
- Operator: Geneva Public Transport
System map
Map of the network in 2026

The Geneva bus is a network of buses forming a partial element of the public transport system in Geneva, Switzerland. It is operated by Transports Publics Genevois (TPG), and is supplemented by the Geneva trolleybus system and the Geneva trams. There are lines running throughout the canton except for Céligny. There are a few lines that run in the Ain and Haute-Savoie departments in France. Some lines aren't operated by TPG but rather by Lihsa (271,272,274).

== Lines ==
There are 59 bus lines in Geneva (TPG only).

== Vehicles ==
As of March 2026, the following types are used on Geneva Bus services:

- Hess TOSA BGX-NXD
- Hess TOSA BGGX- N2D
- Hess TOSA
- Evobus O530G
- Evobus O530
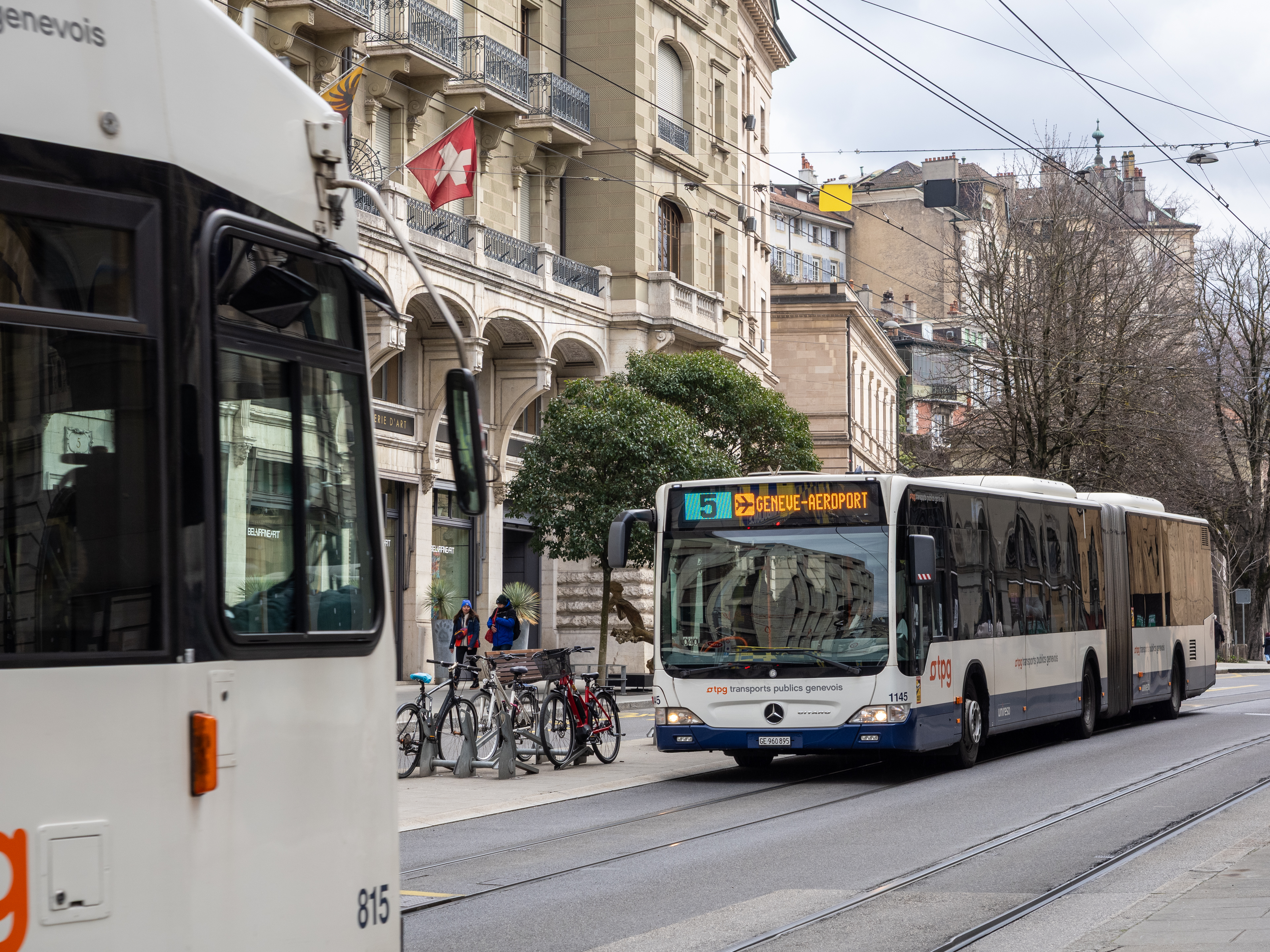
Mercedes-Benz O530G "Citaro"

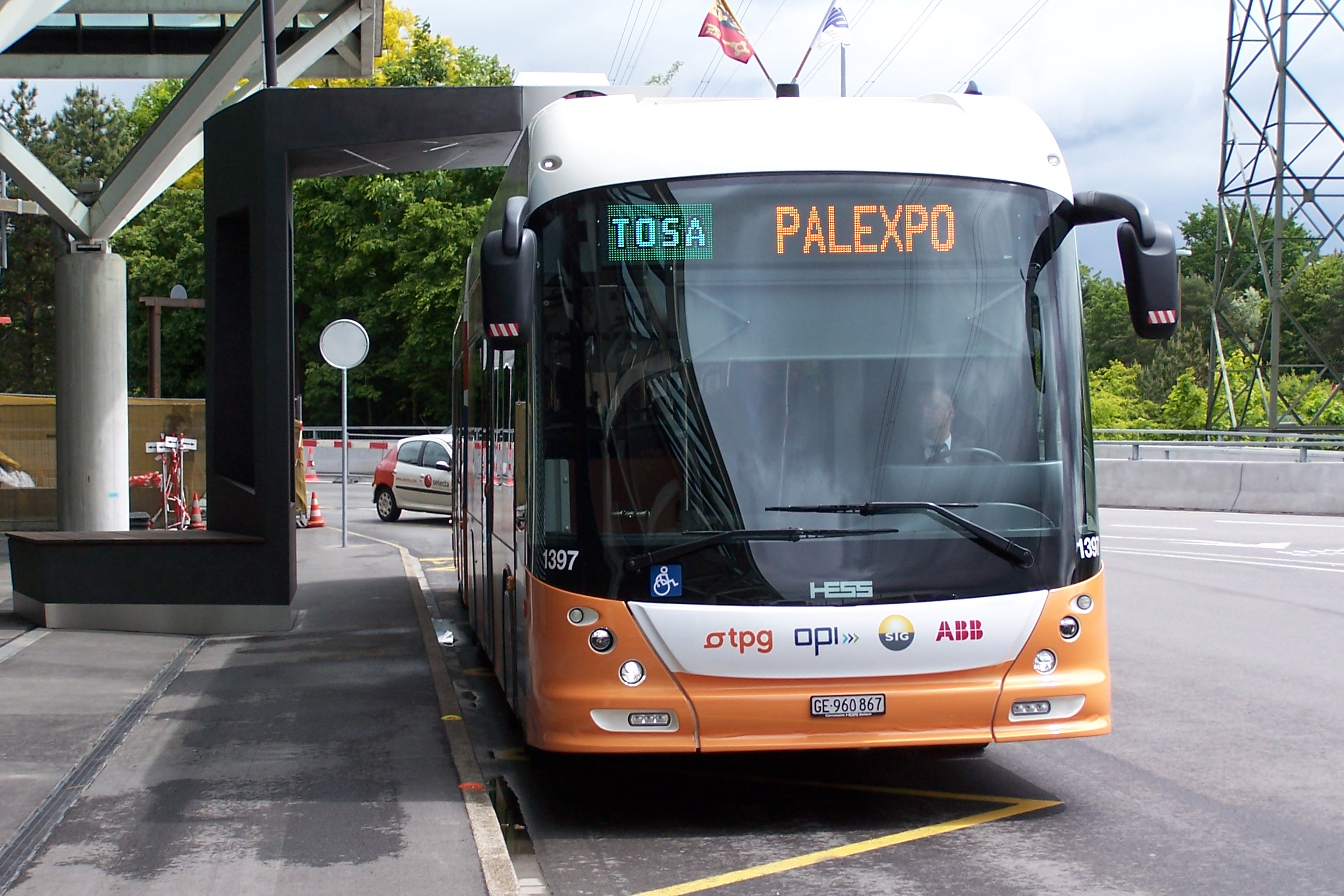
HESS TOSA series set in new livery
