= Geneva Public Transport =

Genevan transport authority

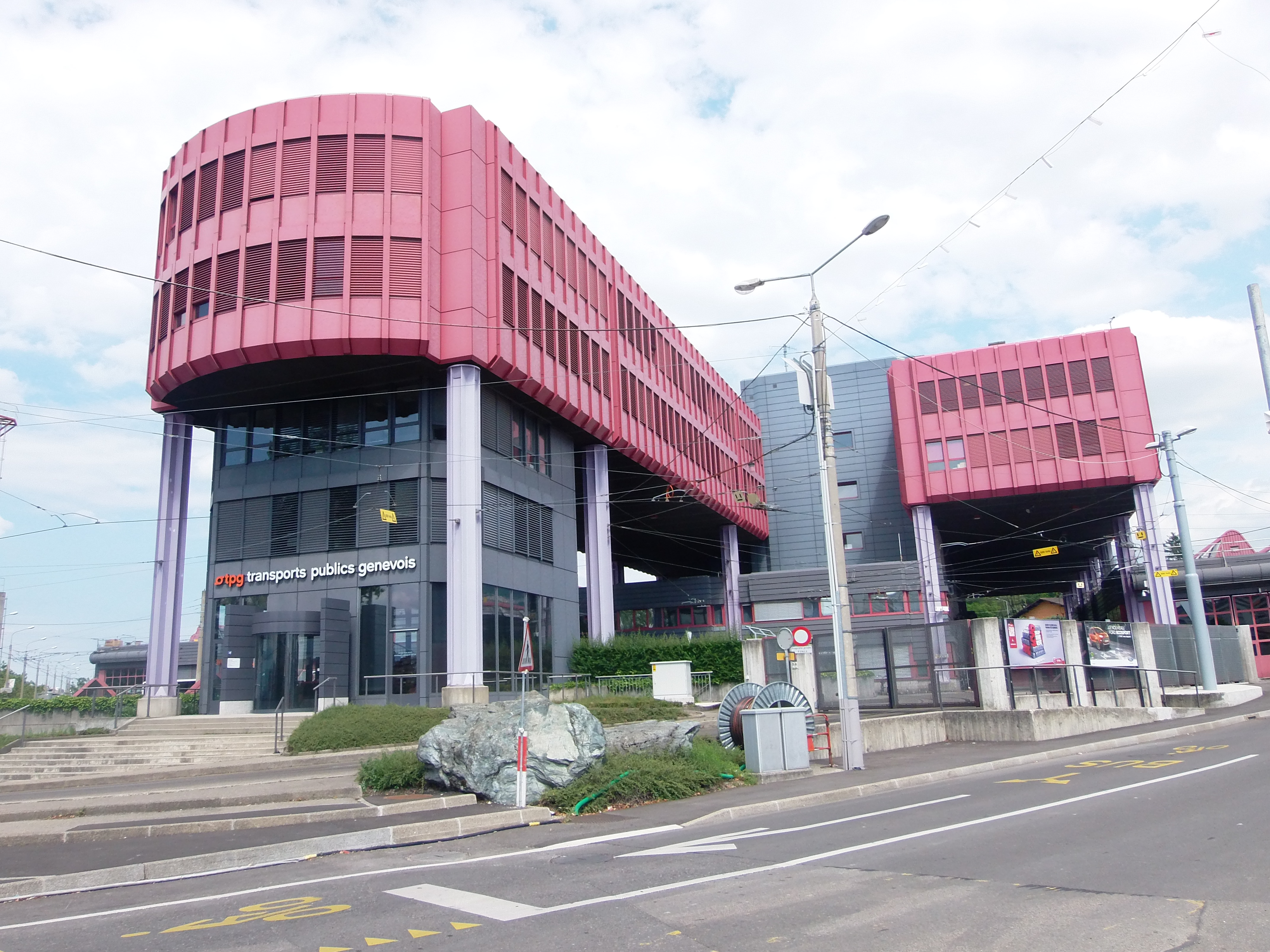
- Head office in Grand-Lancy, Geneva
- Abbreviation: tpg
- Formation: 1 January 1977; 49 years ago
- Type: Autonomous public-law institution
- Headquarters: Route de la Chapelle 1, 1212 Grand-Lancy, Geneva
- Region served: Geneva, Switzerland
- Services: Geneva Tramway; Geneva Buses; Geneva Trolleybuses
- President of the Board of Directors: Stéphanie Lammar
- Director General: Lionel Brasier
- Budget: CHF 325 million (2025)
- Staff: 2'468 (2024)
- Website: www.tpg.ch

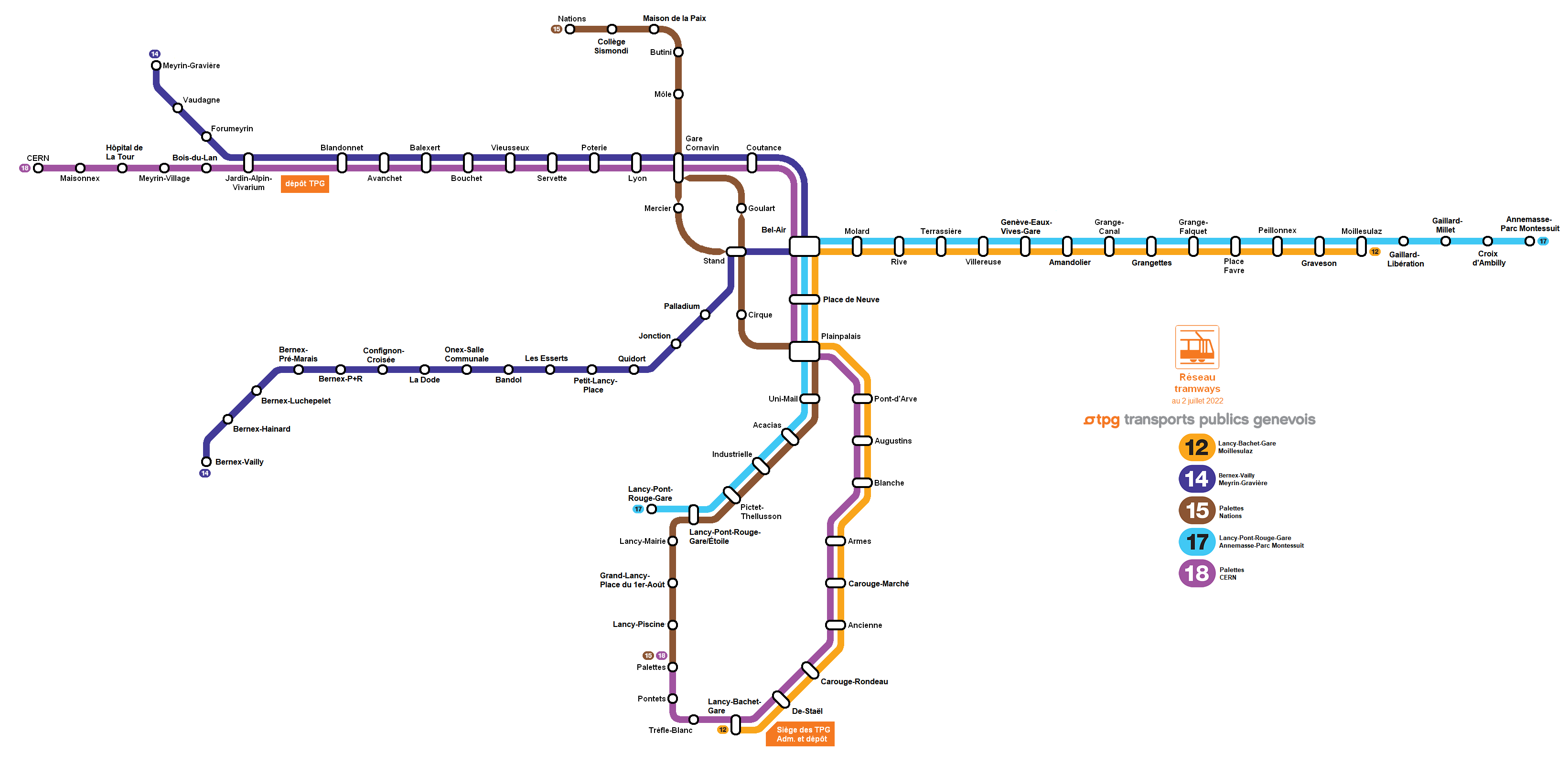
Schematic Network Map of trams in Geneva

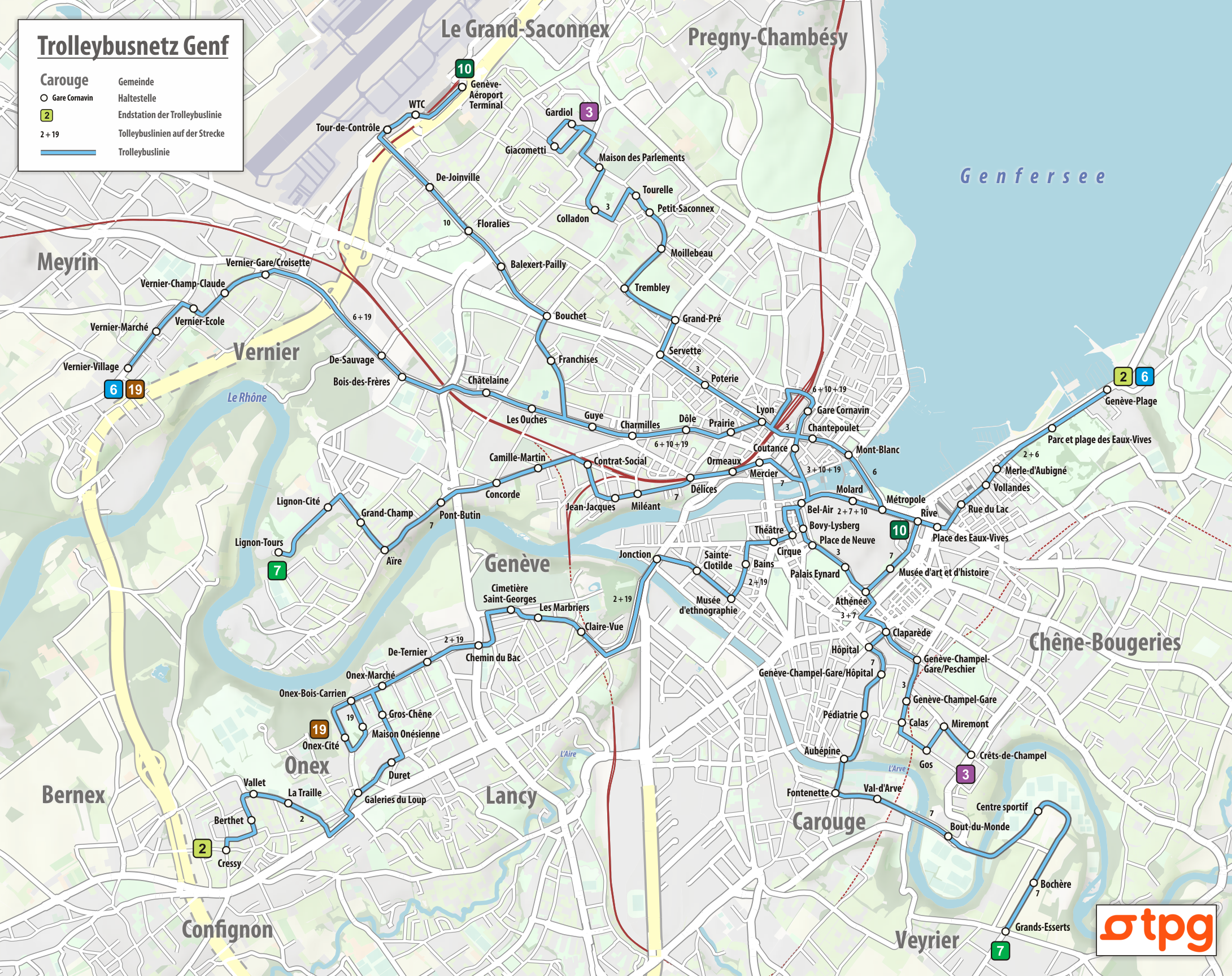
Network Map of the trolleybusses in Geneva

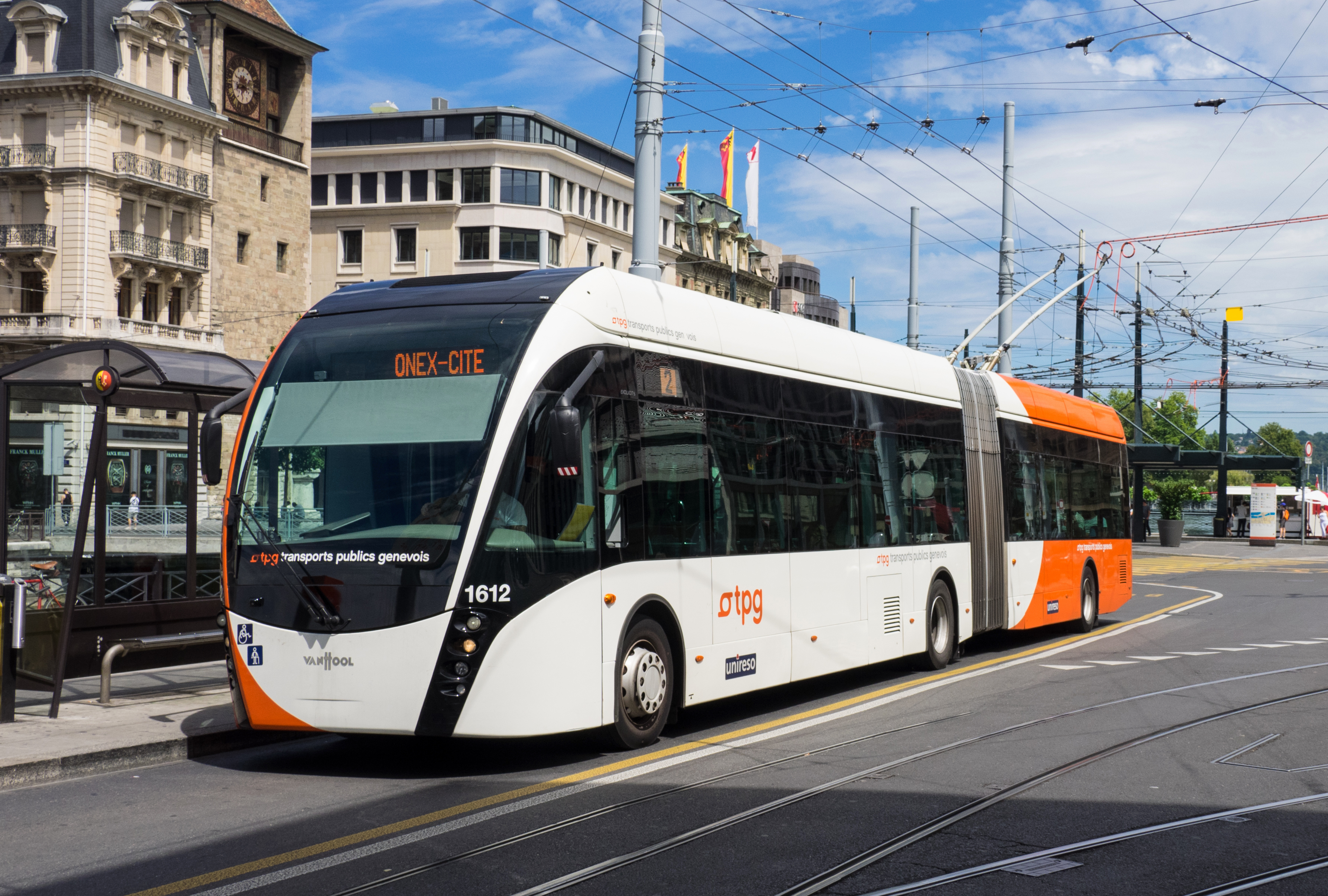
A trolleybus of TPG

The Geneva Public Transport (French: Transports publics genevois), also known as TPG, is an autonomous public-law institution responsible for most of the public transportation system in the canton of Geneva, Switzerland.

The TPG is the successor organization to the Geneva Electric Tramway Company, or CGTE, which operated trams throughout the canton and parts of neighbouring France from 1900 until 1 January 1977.

The TPG operates trams, trolleybuses and buses for the canton of Geneva and also serves some regions in neighbouring France. Local rail services are provided by the CFF (Swiss Federal Railways) and the SNCF, and passenger ferries across the lake by the Mouettes Genevoises Navigation. The TPG shares a common fare system (Unireso) with these services and some in neighbouring France so that a single ticket can be used for any public transport within its zones and times of validity.

== History ==
In December 2003, the TPG began road-testing a 24-metre (78.7 ft), double-articulated, mega-trolleybus manufactured by Hess and Vossloh Kiepe. The bus can carry 150 passengers. It entered passenger service in January 2004 on line 10 to the airport. This vehicle was created by adding a middle section to a trolleybus that was originally a single-articulated, 18-metre (59.1 ft) vehicle. In 2005–06, TPG purchased ten all-new double-articulated trolleybuses from Hess, length 24.7 m (81.0 ft), and they are numbered 781-790. As of late 2006, TPG's fleet included 92 trolleybuses, all articulated (of which eleven were double-articulated).

As of 27 April 2008, the TPG network included 6 tramway routes, 38 cantonal bus routes, 15 intercantonal (Canton of Vaud) and international (France) bus routes and 12 nighttime bus routes.

In December 2010, Line 18 opened, from Avanchet to Coutance; it was extended as far as CERN in May 2011, closed in December 2011 and replaced by Line 14. In December 2012, the tramway was again split into line 14 (Meyrin-Gravière – P+R Bernex) and line 18 (CERN – Carouge).

In 2008 construction of the Cornavin - Onex - Bernex Tramway (TCOB) started and finished in December 2011. Line 14 originally ran from P+R Bernex to Meyrin-Gravière or CERN, but has since then been split into Line 14 (P+R Bernex – Meyrin-Gravière) and Line 18 (Carouge – CERN) in December 2012.

== Trams ==
TPG's tram network is the core rail component of the system consisting of five lines. the network has a total route length of 55.91 km and serves some 135 stations.

== Trolleybuses ==
TPG's trolleybus network complements the tramway, and its scheduled trolleybus services are lines 2, 3, 6, 7, 10 and 19.

== Buses ==
TPG's bus network provides the broadest territorial coverage of the system, including urban, regional and cross-border services between Switzerland and France.

== Other service ==
TPG also operates tpg flex, an on-demand bus service that complements the regular network.

== See also ==
- Trams in Geneva
- Trolleybuses in Geneva
- Buses in Geneva
- Transport in Switzerland
- List of bus operating companies in Switzerland
- Plainpalais
