= Lyon–Geneva railway =

Railway line in France and Switzerland

Lyon - Geneva
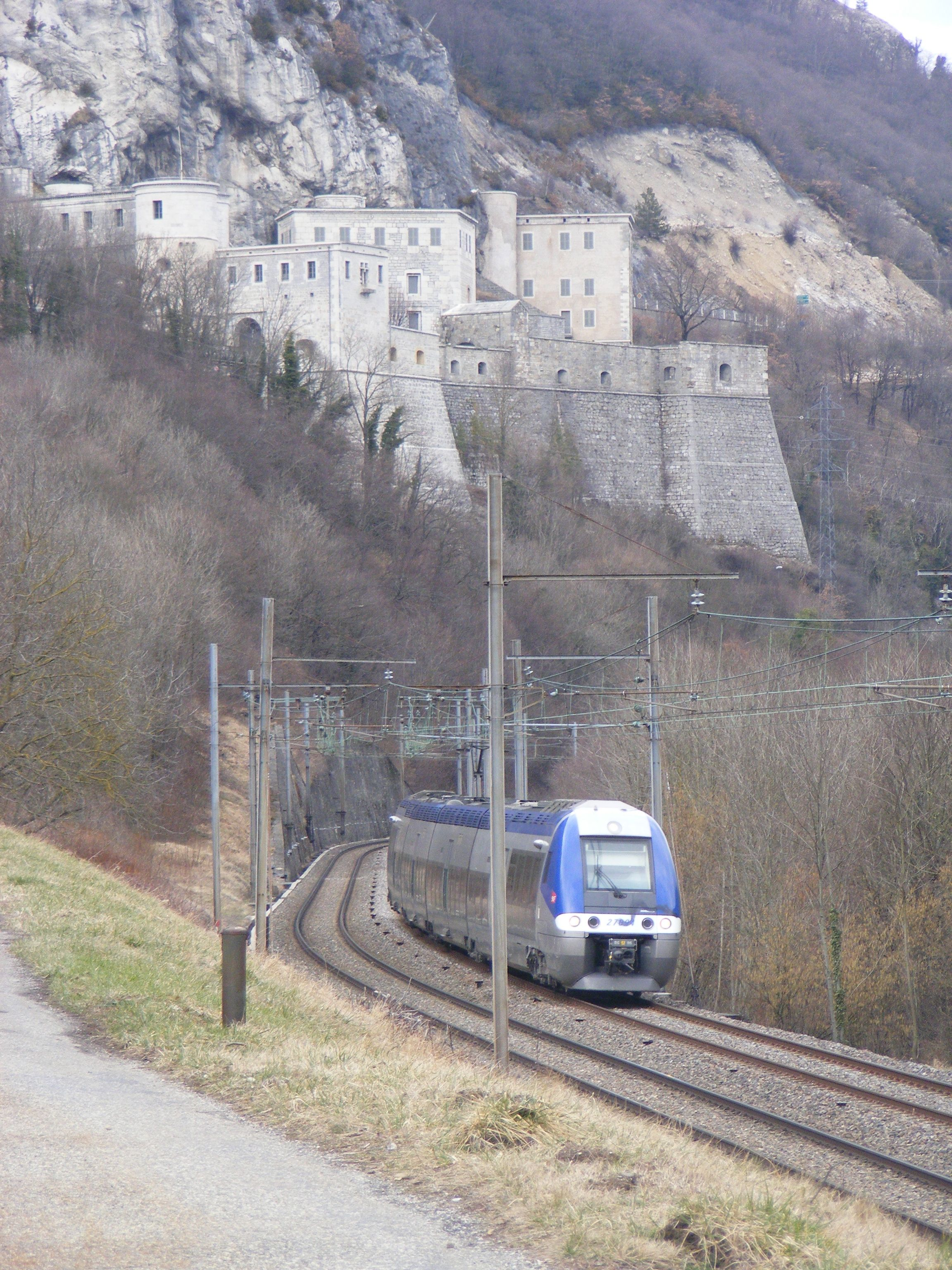
- Z27894 passing by Fort de l'Ecluse

Overview
- Owner: RFF
- Locale: Switzerland (Canton of Geneva), France (Rhône-Alpes)
- Termini: Gare de Lyon-Perrache; Gare de Cornavin, Geneva

Service
- Type: TGV, TER, RER and freight
- System: SNCF
- Operator(s): SNCF

History
- Opened: 1858; 168 years ago

Technical
- Line length: 167.6 km (104.1 mi)
- Number of tracks: Double track
- Track gauge: 1,435 mm (4 ft 8 1/2 in) standard gauge
- Electrification: 1.5 kV DC

The Lyon–Geneva railway is an important route in the national rail network. It connects not only Geneva but also feeds the Maurienne railway and the Geneva to Valence via Grenoble line. It carries a variety of traffic: TGV Paris-Geneva, Geneva - South of France, TER Auvergne-Rhône-Alpes, Léman Express and goods trains.

The line is numbered 890 000 of the RFF national network.

== Route ==
From Lyon-Perrache the line runs round Lyon city centre to Lyon-Part-Dieu. After running through the northeast suburbs of Lyon, the line runs in more or less straight sections across the plain to Ambérieu where it joins the line to Bourg-en Bresse and Macon, (formerly the Geneva Paris route). The rest of the line winds through the foothills of the Alpes and Jura. At Culoz is the junction with the Maurienne line to Turin via Modane. From Culoz the line runs close to the Rhône to Bellegarde-sur-Valerine where it meets the Ligne du Haut-Bugey. After Bellegarde trains plunge into the 4 km Cret d'Eau tunnel, emerging at the Longeray junction, where the line to Evian branches off via the spectacular Longeray viaduct clearly visible from the line. Thereafter, the line descends close to the Rhône, crossing the Swiss frontier between Challex and la Plaine. Between la Plaine and Geneva stations are much closer together, due to commuter traffic for Geneva. Entering the Geneva conurbation through the Meyrin-Vernier industrial estate, with many goods sidings, the railway crosses the Swiss A1 motorway over a high bridge, then reduces to a single track beside the double track Cornavin-Airport line. Inside a tunnel, a triangular junction connects to the la Praille goods yard and the CEVA connection to Annemasse and Evian. Still in the tunnel, the line crosses the Cornavin-Airport line by a diveunder. The line emerges in the St. Jean quarter of Geneva to terminate at platforms 5, 7 and 8 of Cornavin station.

== History ==
=== Creation ===
- 23 June 1856: Opening of the section from Lyon Saint-Clair to Ambérieu-en-Bugey.
- 7 May 1857: Ambérieu to Seyssel
- 18 March 1858: Seyssel to Geneva (Cornavin)
- 1 June 1859: Lyon Saint-Clair to Lyon Brotteaux
- 24 November 1859: link to Lyon Guillotière and Lyon Perrache

=== Electrification ===
The line was progressively electrified to 1500 V DC.

- 14 December 1952: Lyon Perrache and Lyon St Clair.
- 22 September 1953: Lyon-Saint-Clair to Culoz.
- 16 December 1953: Culoz to Bellegarde.
- 20 September 1956: completion of the electrification with the section Bellegarde to Geneva. The inaugural train was hauled by CC 7121 (at the time the world rail speed record holder).

=== Evolution ===
In subsequent years the line has undergone various modifications, the most important of which are:

1980, opening of the cord line at Culoz allowing Genève - Grenoble - Valence traffic to pass through directly at 60 km/h avoiding the reversing movement in Culoz station.

- 27 September 1981 first commercial Paris - Geneva TGV service via Bellegarde, Culoz, Ambérieu et Bourg-en-Bresse.
- 12 June 1983 last day of operation of Lyon-Brotteaux station.
- 13 June 1983 first day of operation of Lyon-Part-Dieu station.
- May 1987: Opening of the branch to Geneva airport. Most of the traffic West from Cornavin became long distance Swiss trains terminating at the airport in place of the relatively sparse traffic to the SNCF network. Accordingly, the main lines were reelectrified to the Swiss standard of 15 kV 16.7 Hz while a third line dedicated to SNCF traffic used a new single track line running parallel through to Cornavin.
- 12 December 2010: reopening of the Ligne du Haut-Bugey for TGV traffic to Paris, diverting TGVs from the Bellegarde to Ambérieu section.
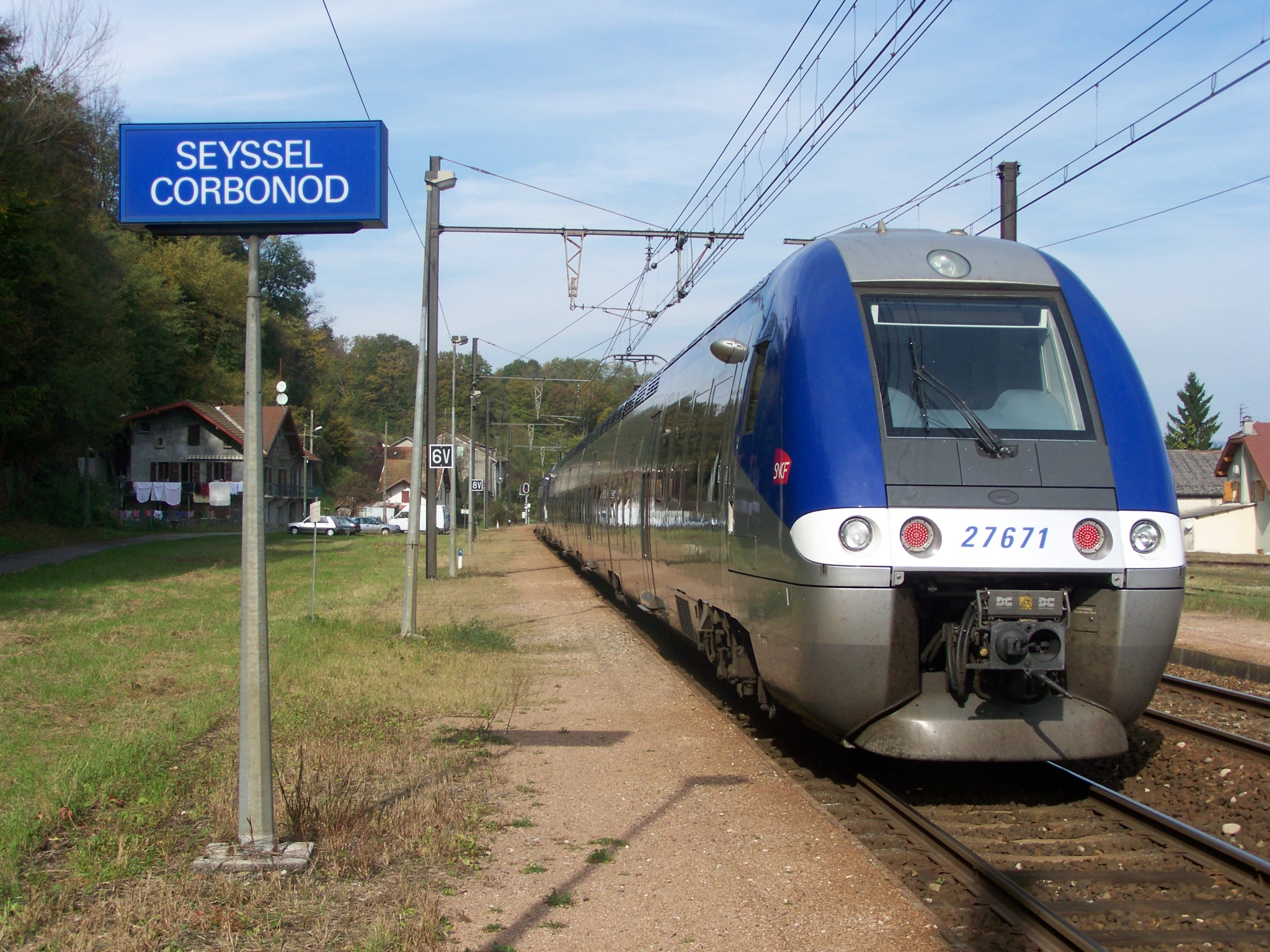
TER at Seyssel-Corbonod station, en route from Lyon to Geneva.

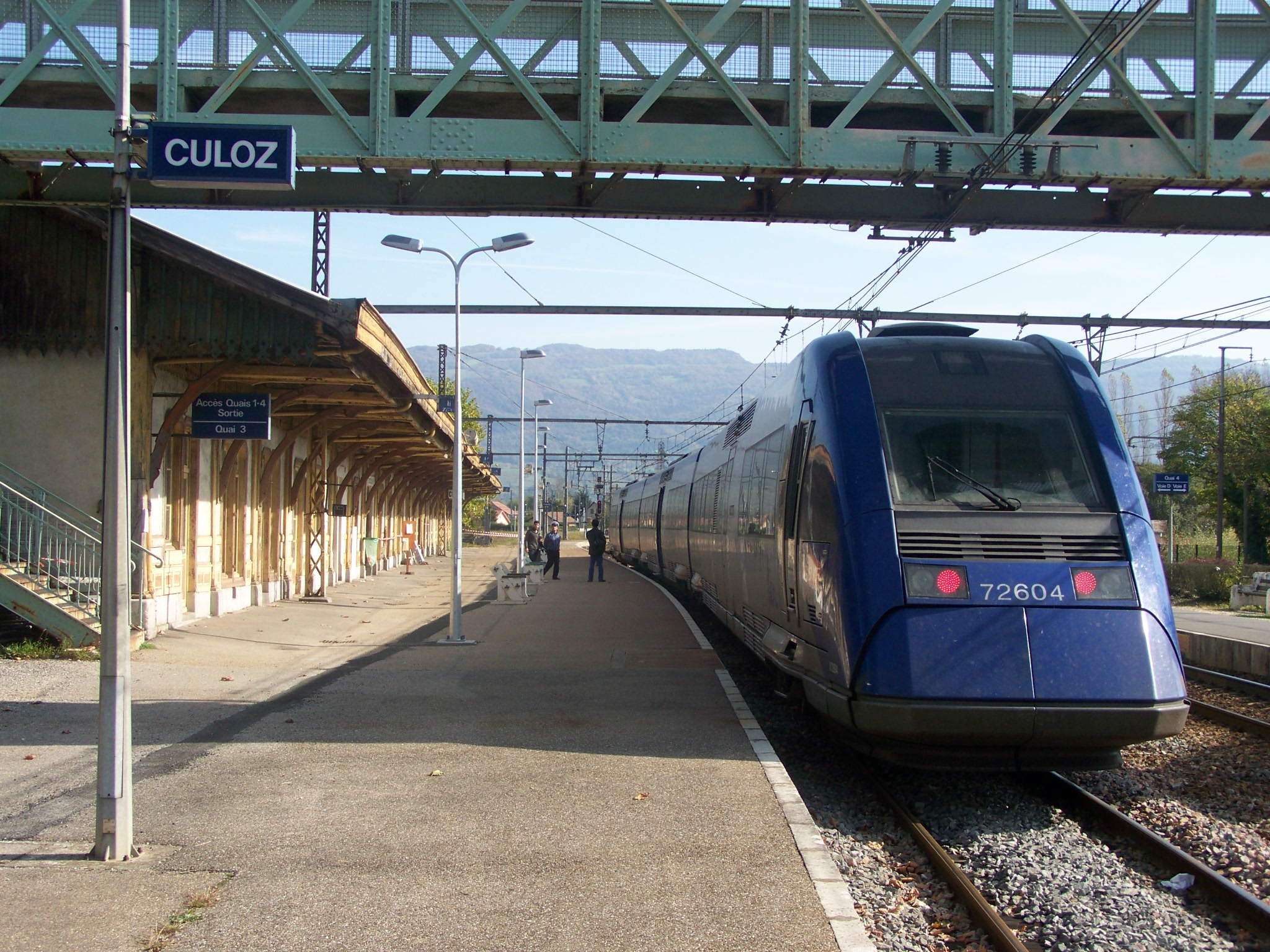
TER from Geneva to Valence reversing at Culoz station.

=== Geneva-Bellegarde Section ===
All the different types of traffic mentioned in the introduction run on this section. Direct passenger services from Bellegarde to Geneva are provided by French TGV or TER trains, while stopping services are provided by the Swiss Rhône Express Régional service. Because it was electrified and signalled to a French system but operated in part by the Swiss Railways there were several unusual hybrids on the line, illustrated in the photos, including:

- Swiss EMUs running on 1500 V DC and using the French train control system
- French style signals built by the Swiss signal maker Integra
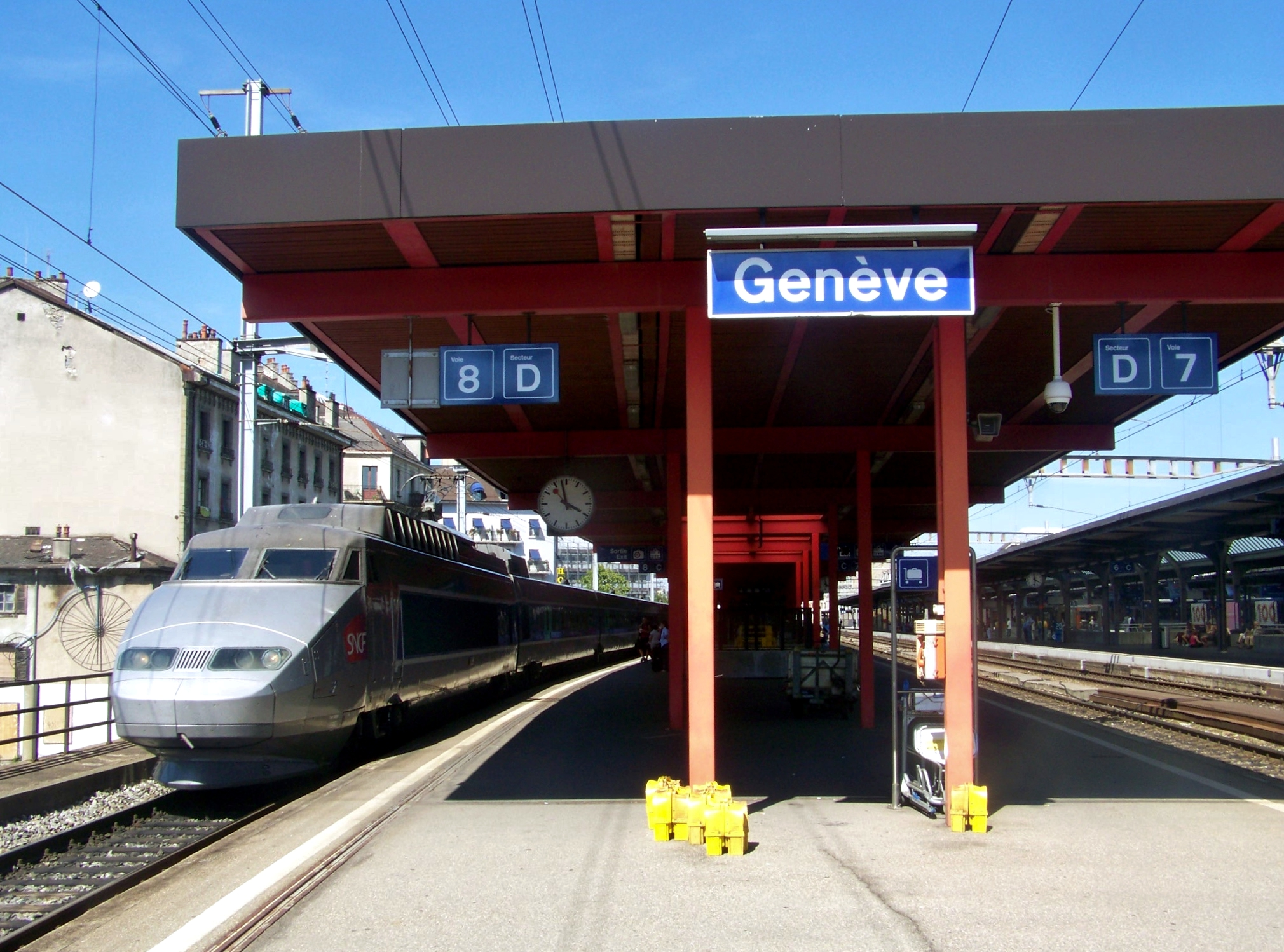
TGV in Cornavin station.

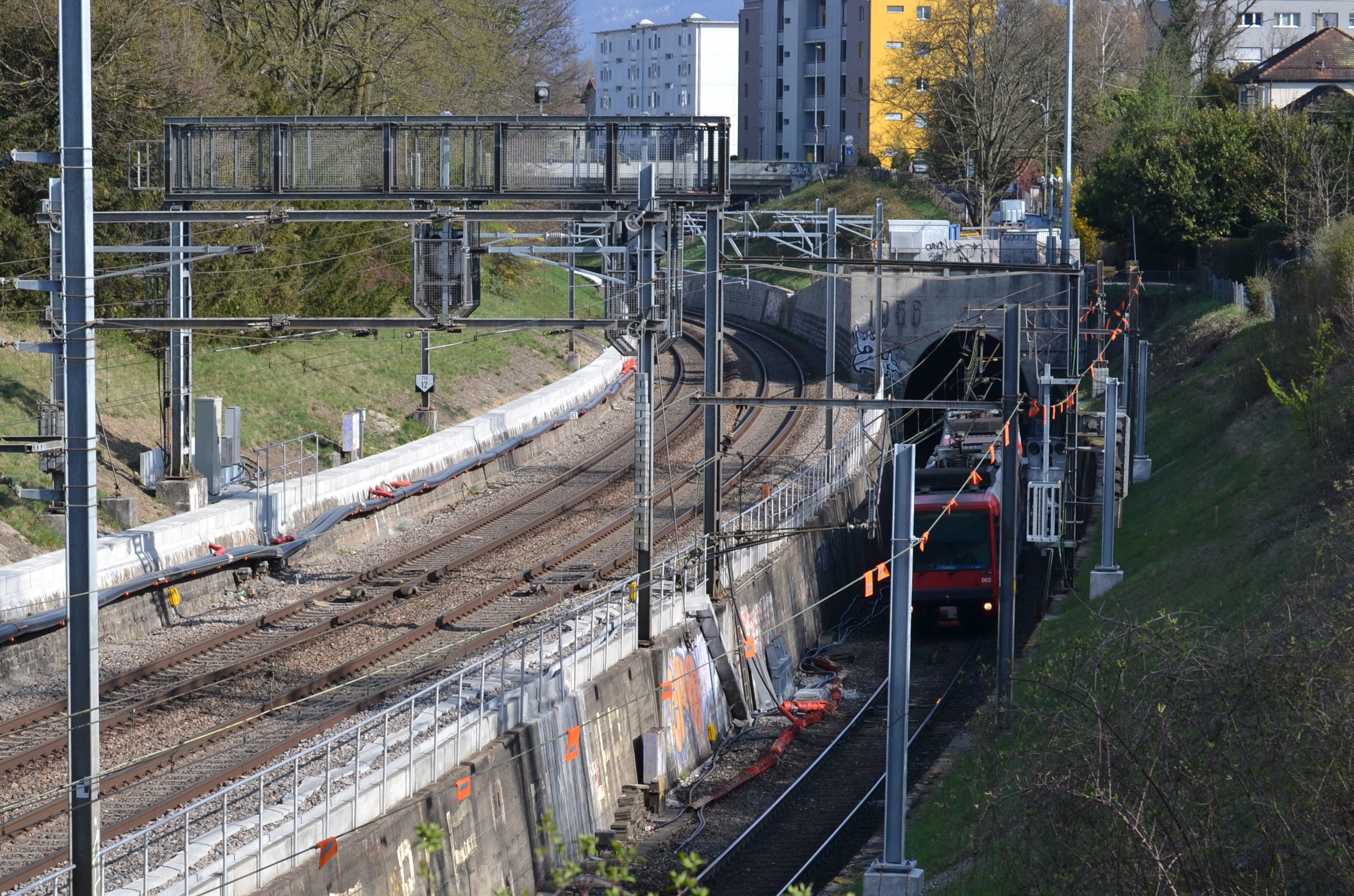
Bem550 emerging from St Jean tunnel on 1500 V single line section between Vernier and Cornavin

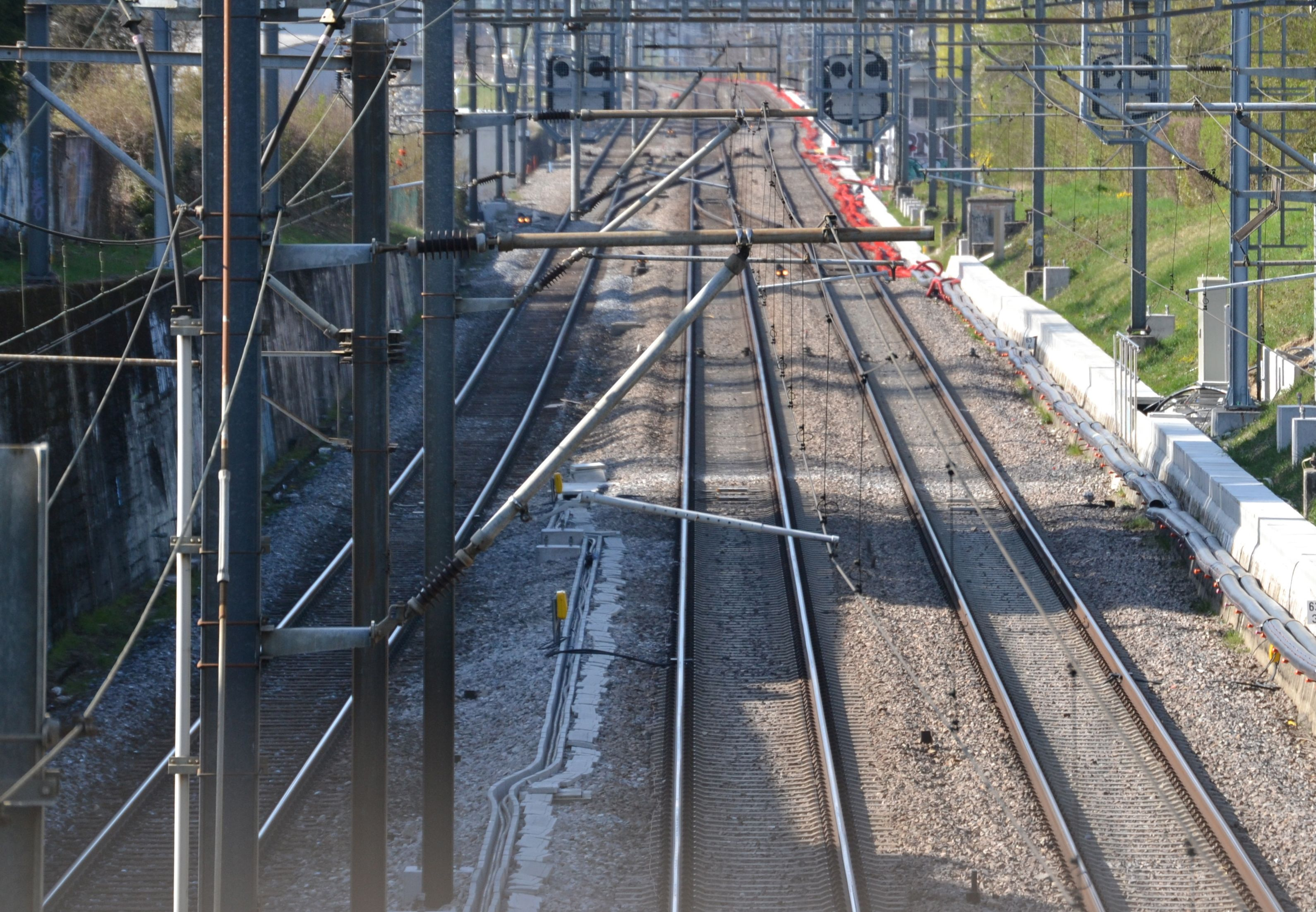
The single line 1500 V section toward Lyon on the left running alongside the 15 kV double track (on the right) toward the airport.

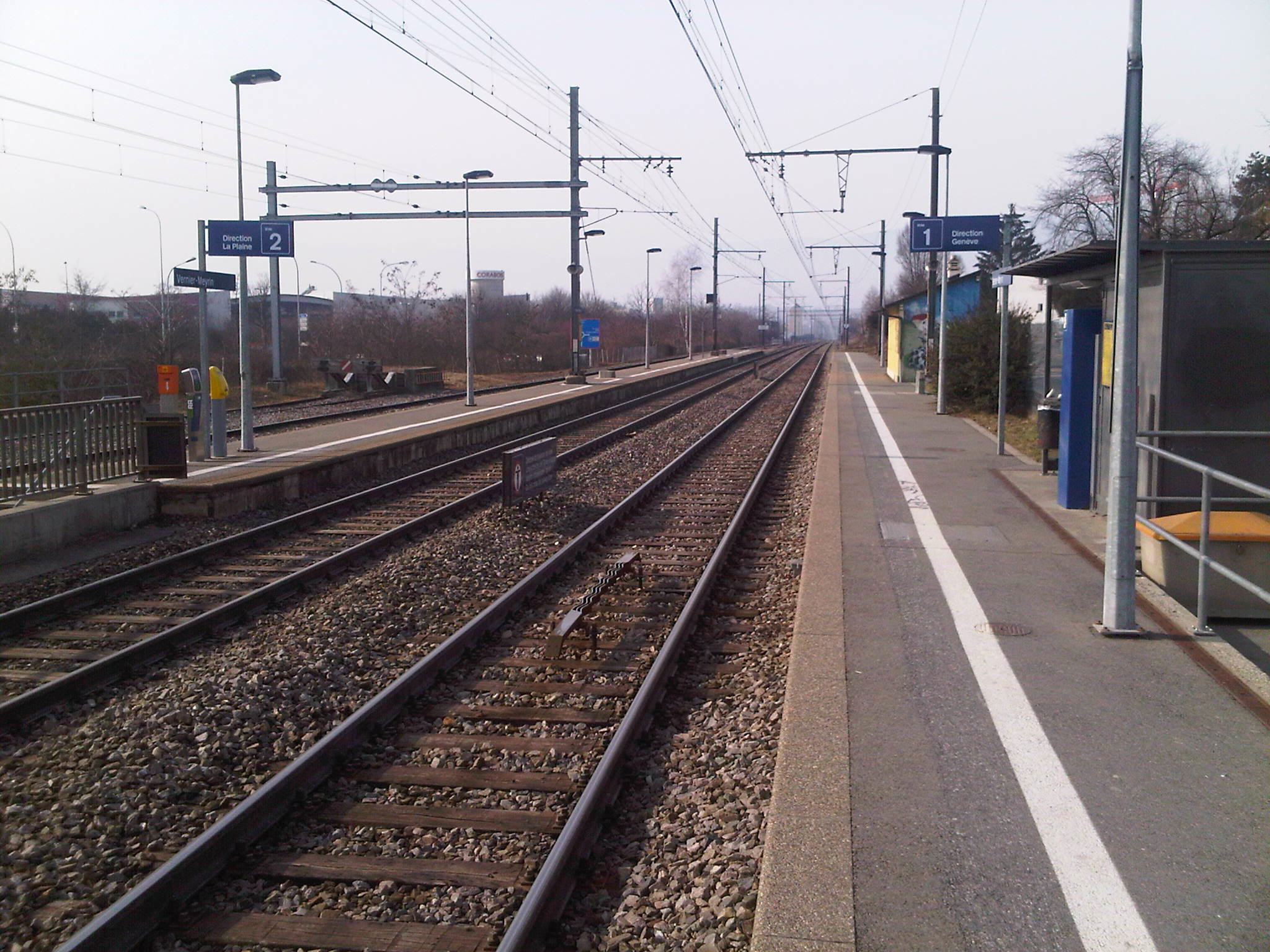
Vernier-Meyrin Station with French train control relay clearly visible in the foreground

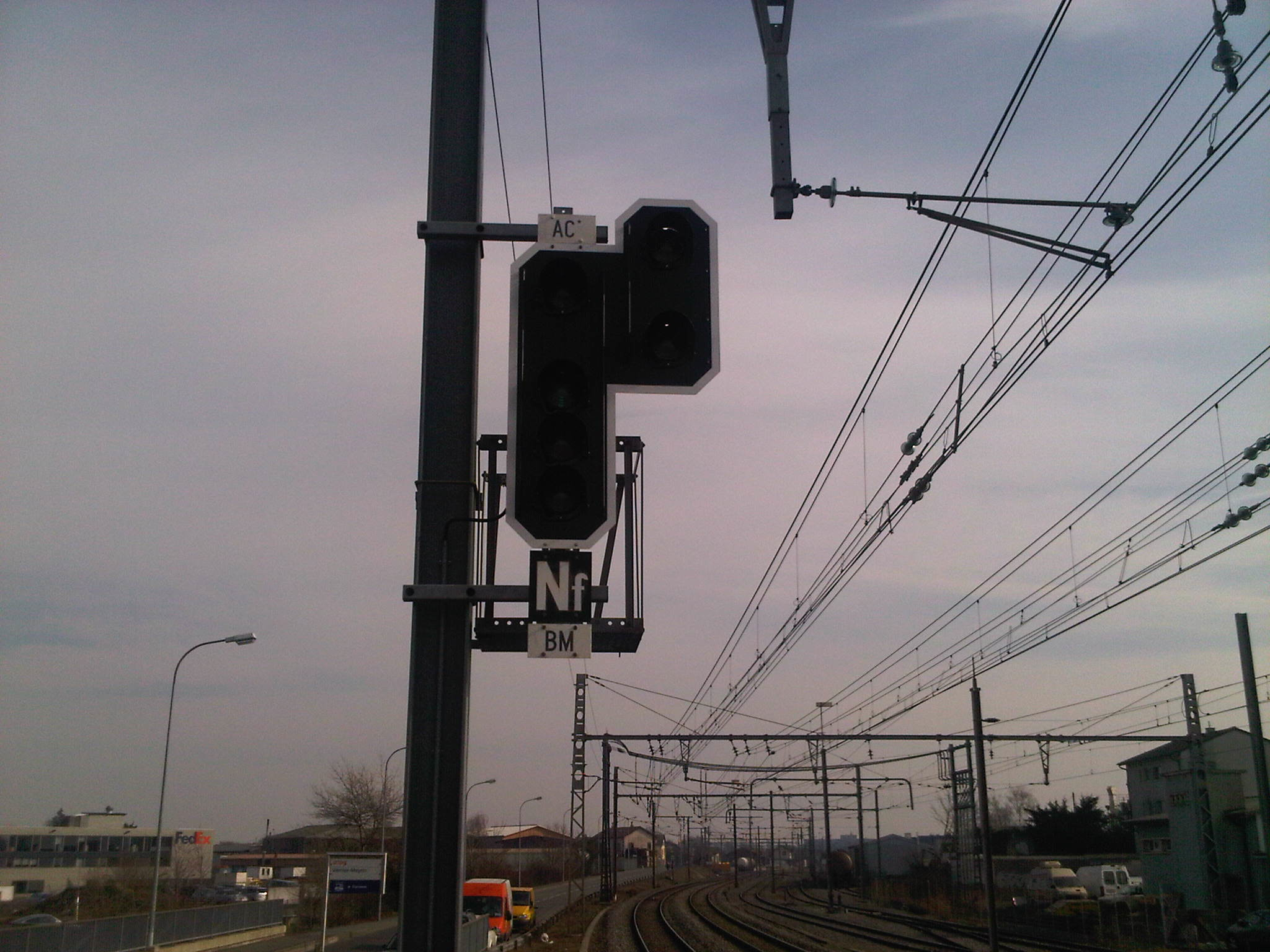
Signal near Vernier-Meyrin station. This is a French Carré signal built by Integra to the French system. Note the Swiss style octagonal backplate.

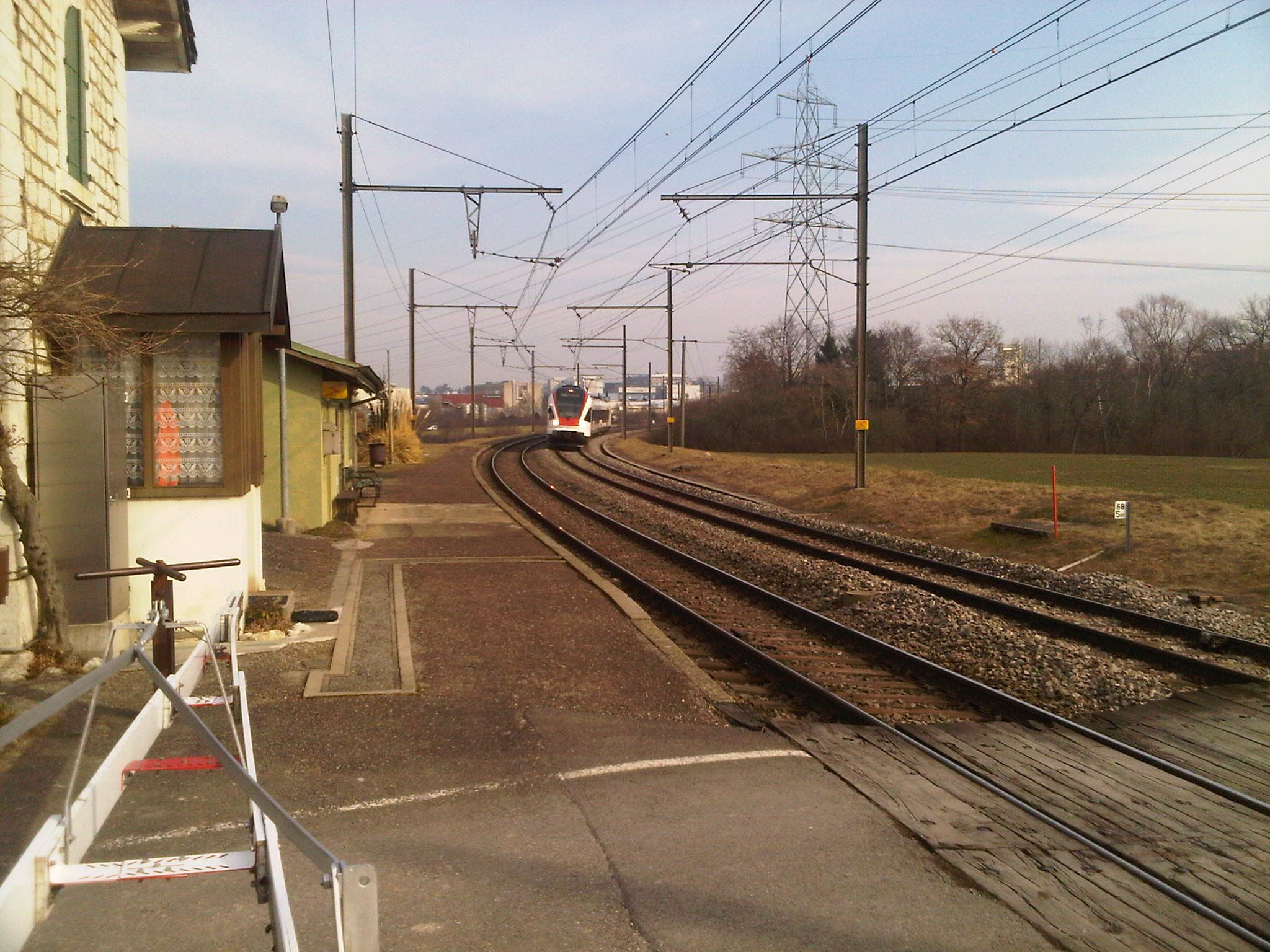
Bourdigny Station (disused) with RABe 522 RER for la Plaine

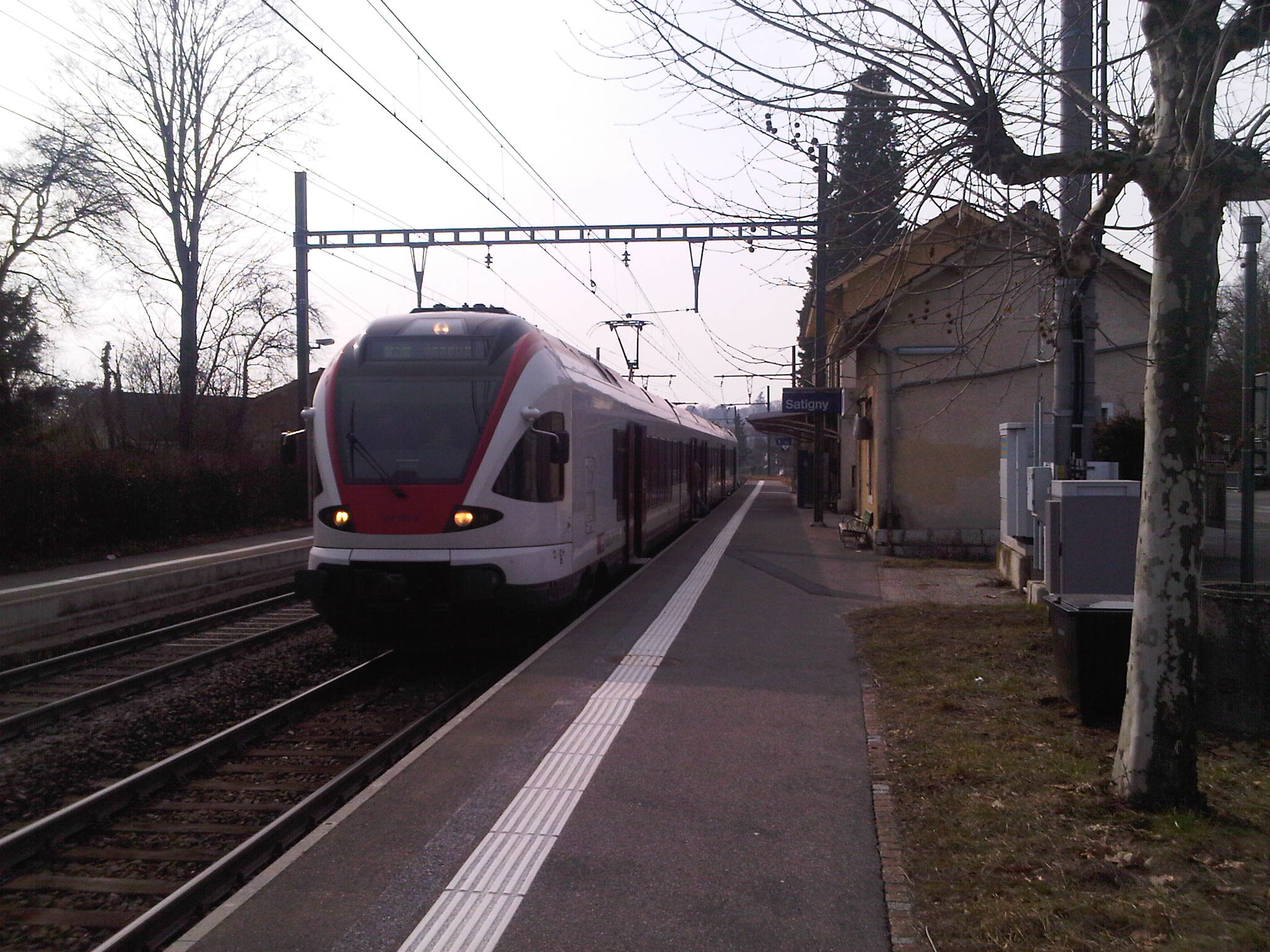
Satigny Station with RABe 522 RER for Geneva Cornavin

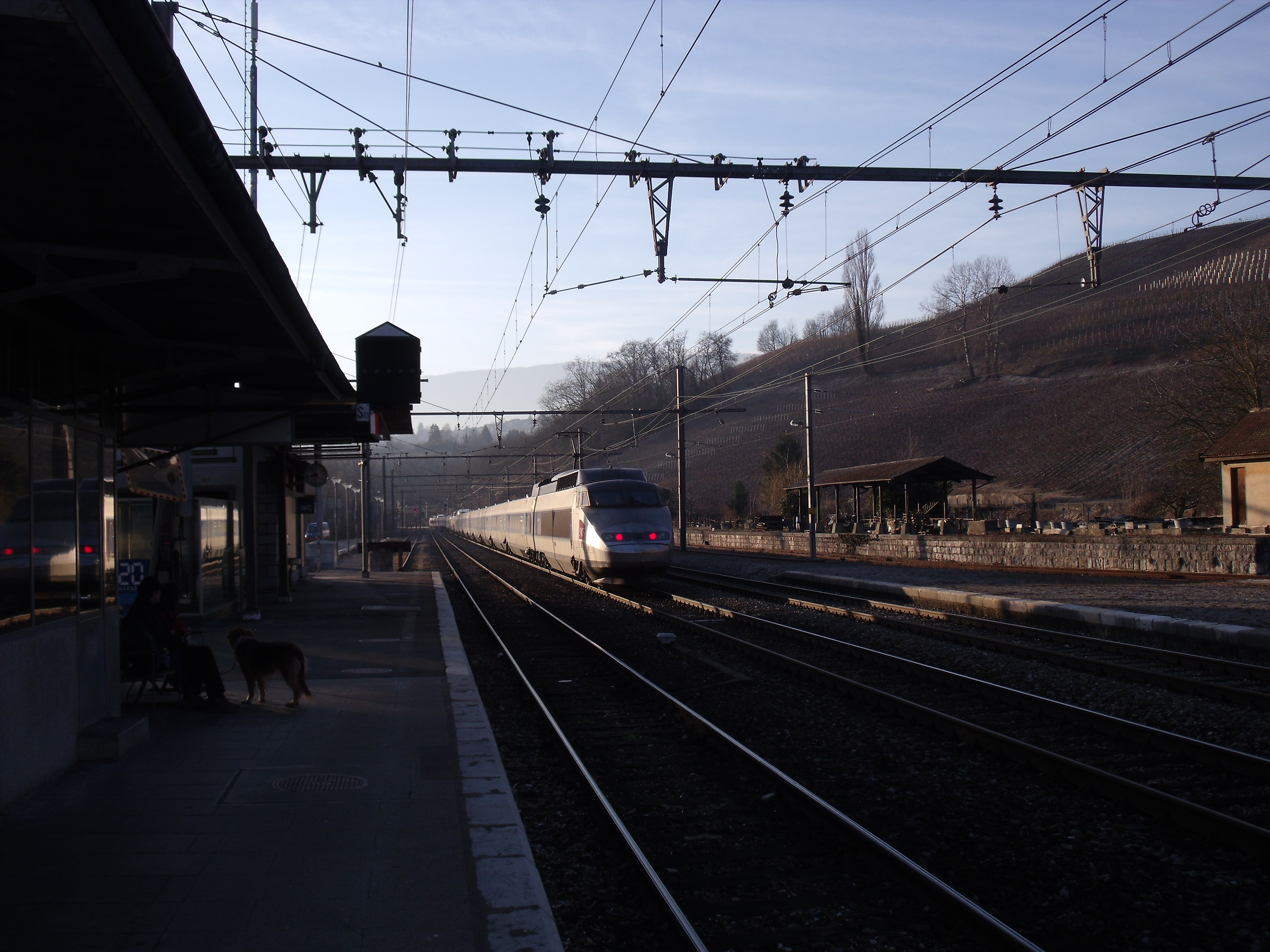
La Plaine station in 2011. The old station building was demolished in early 2019. TGV 6576 en route from Geneva to Paris.

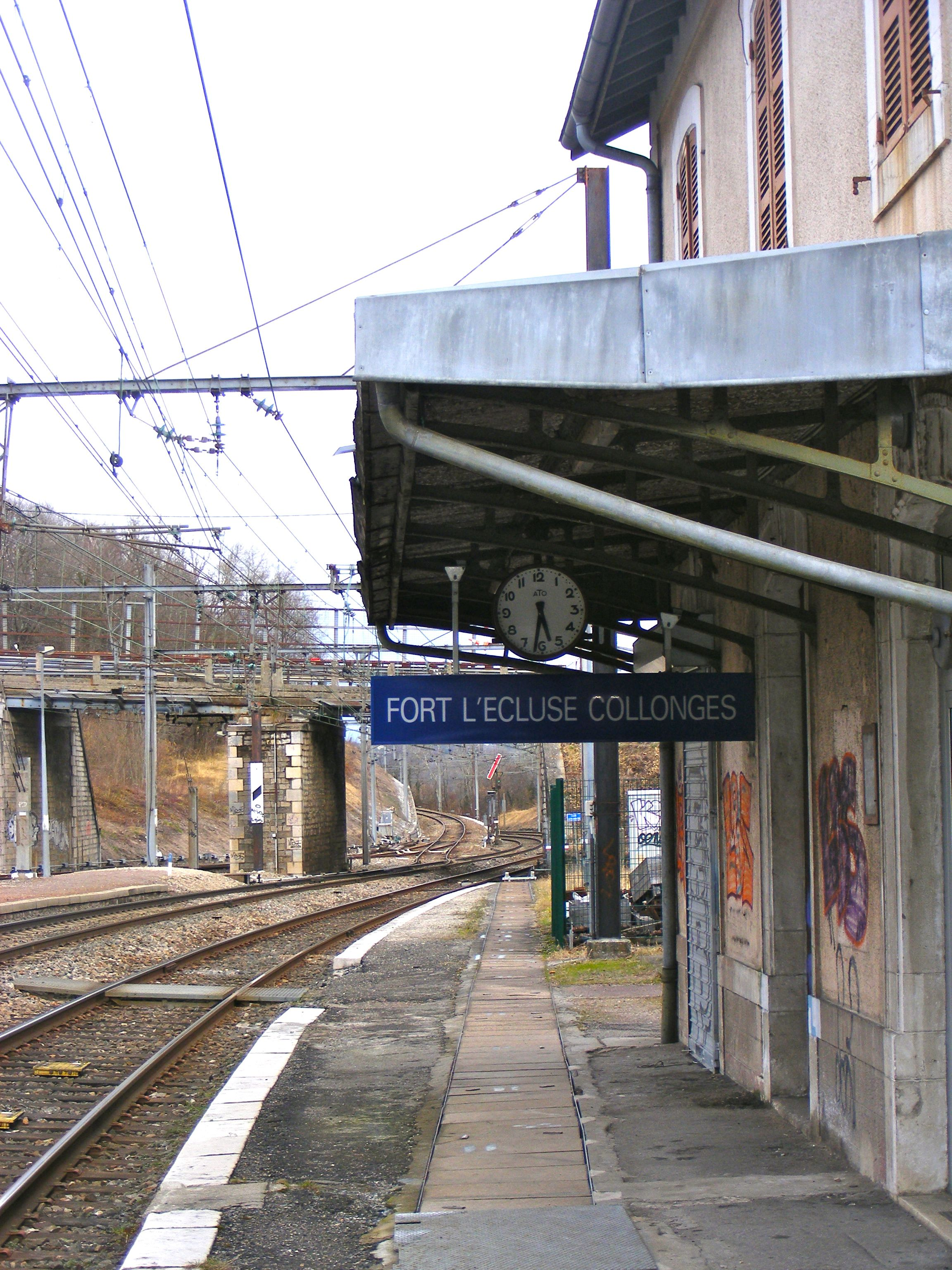
Gare de Fort l'Ecluse Collonges. The clock works, although it's on summer time in winter. In the left background, the Divonne line climbs away steeply

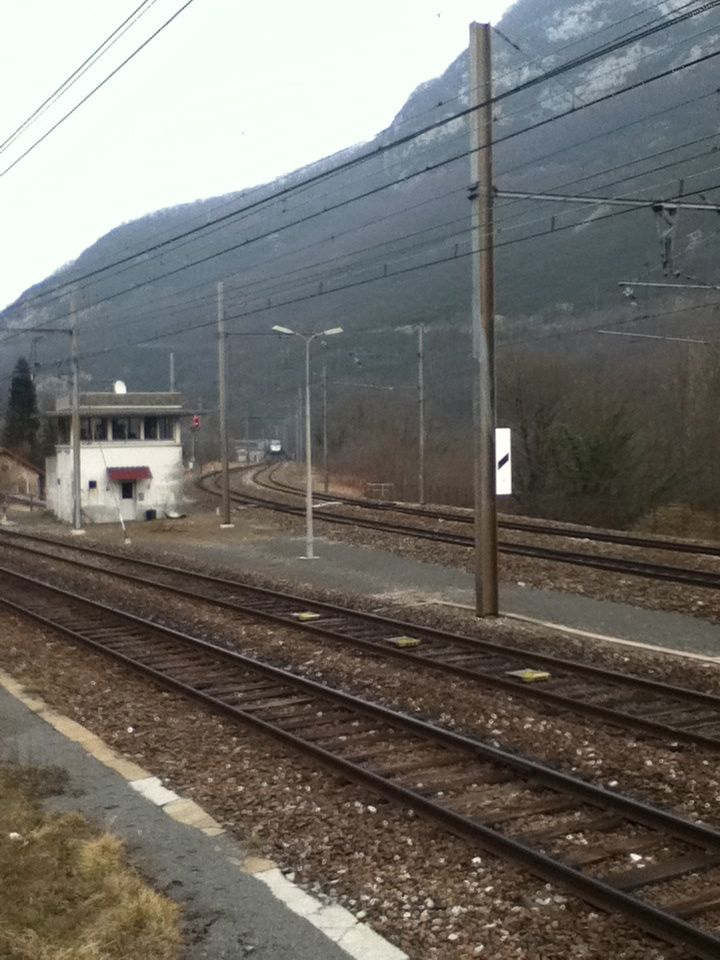
Longeray viaduct seen from Léaz-Longeray junction, with a Paris bound TGV coming from Evian

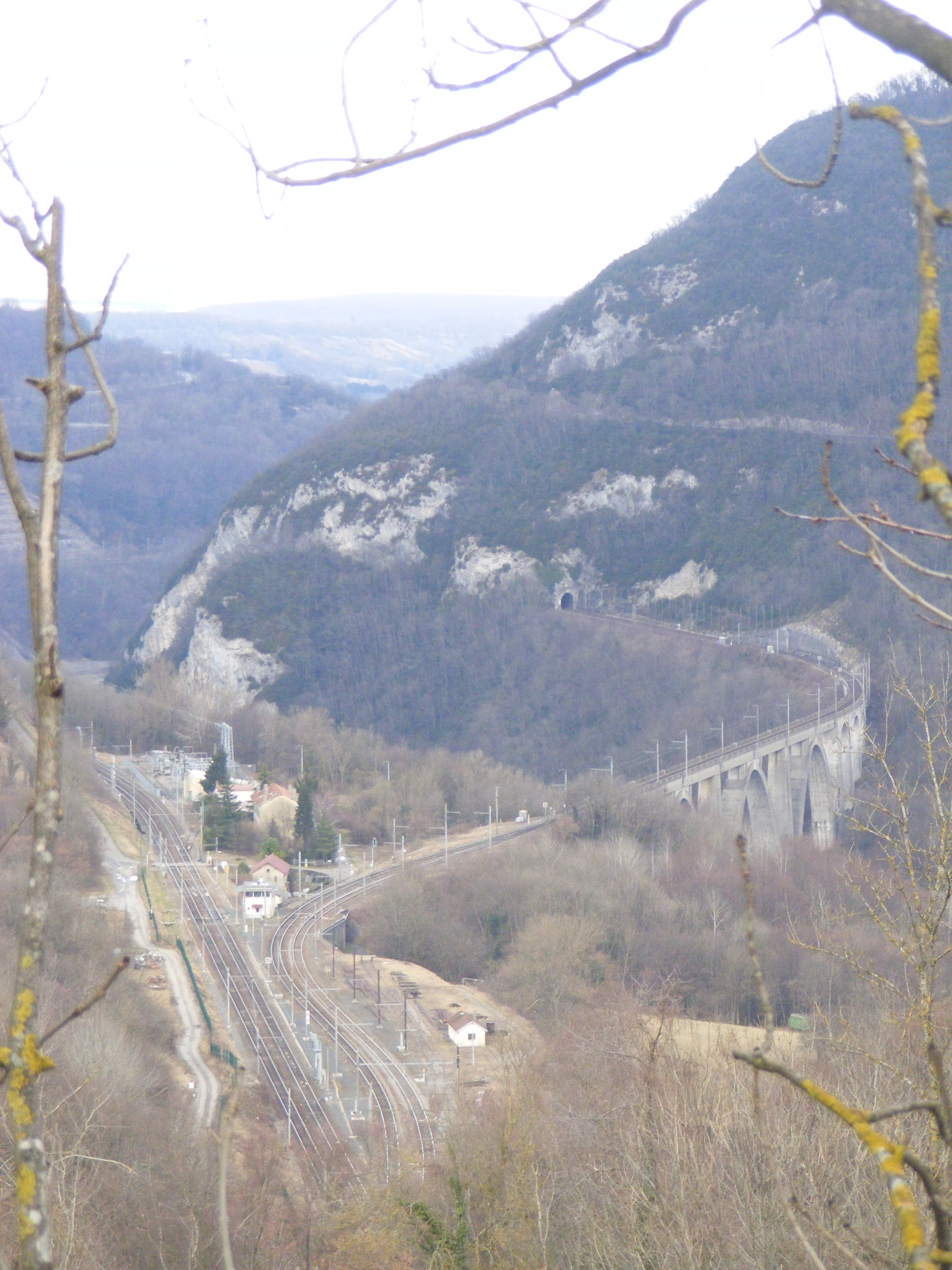
Léaz-Longeray junction seen from the road above

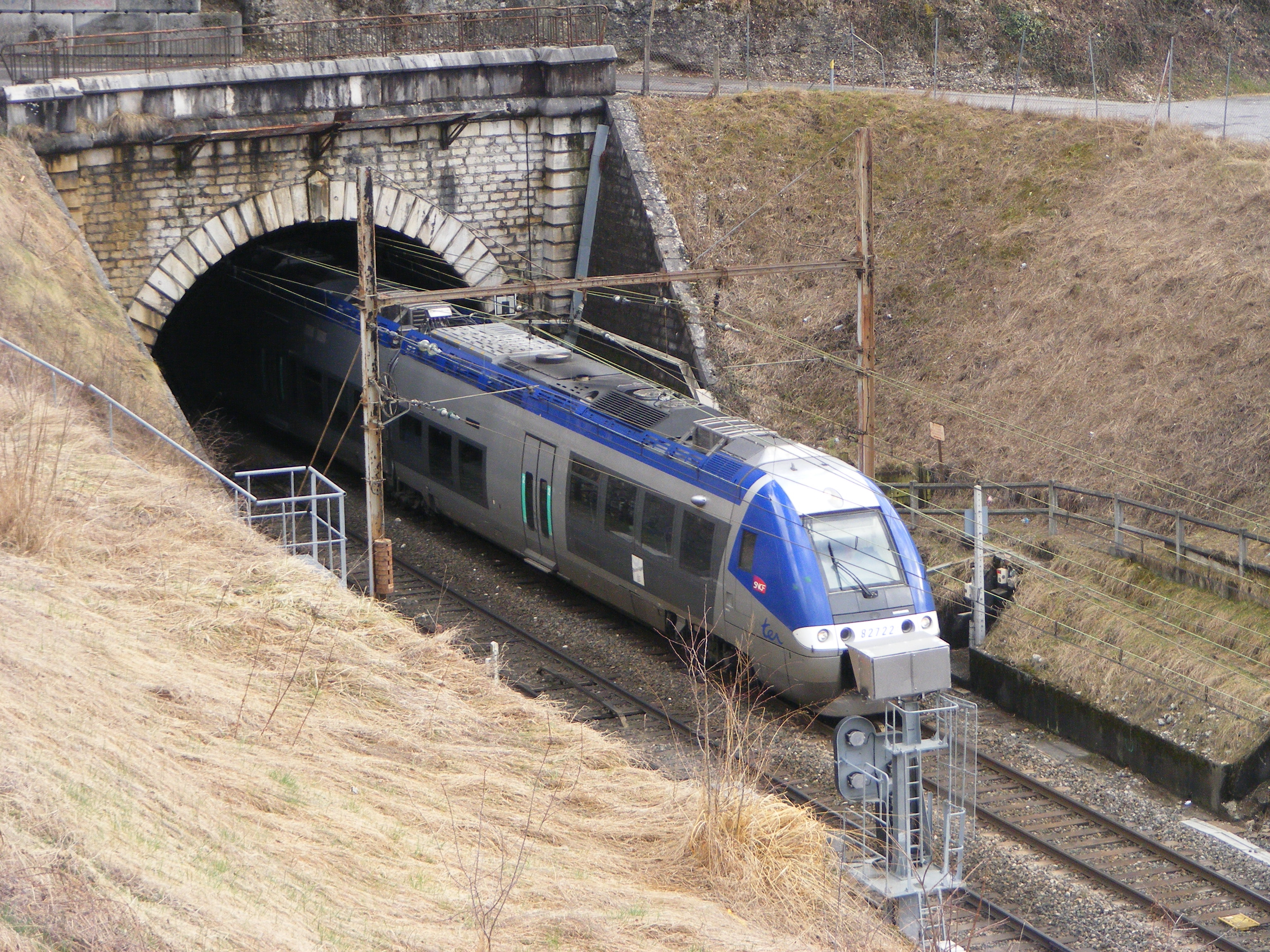
Grenoble bound TER emerging from the South portal of the Cret d'Eau tunnel

==== Upgrade Project Geneva Bellegarde 2014 25 kV ====
Suburban traffic on the Geneva- Bellegarde section is increasing steadily and the single track section is expected to become a serious bottleneck. The southern branch of the Geneva RER, the CEVA will be electrified to 25 kV 50 Hz, so the 1.5 kV DC electrification of the Geneva to Bellegarde section is a third voltage for regional trains. To alleviate these two problems, two engineering projects have been carried out, the first being to modify the double and single lines between Cornavin and the junction to the airport for bidirectional operation on all three tracks with either 25 or 15 kV, and the second to reelectrify the Bellegarde to Geneva section to 25 kV AC. The works were completed in August 2014, and the Bellegarde to Geneva section is entirely under 25 kV. Between la Plaine and Geneva, the signals are all Swiss, controlled from Geneva and allowing bidirectional operation. The Bem 550 and 'Flirt' 524 EMUs have been replaced by 'Flirt' 522s and 'Colibri' 562s

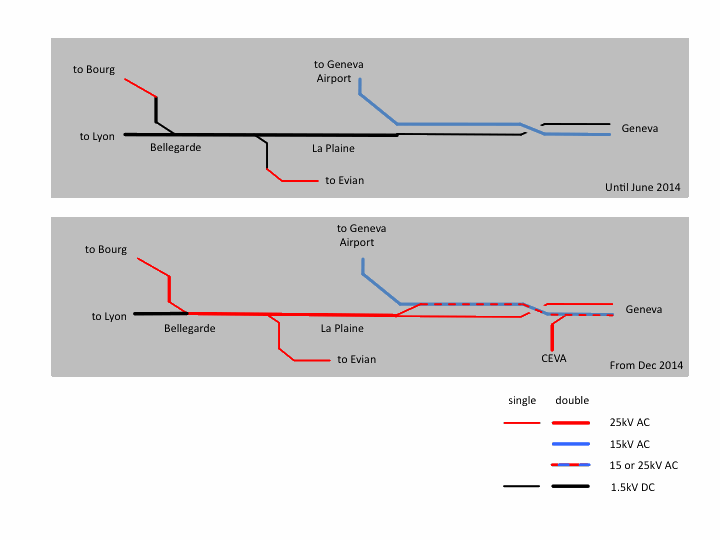
Upgrades to Geneva Bellegarde section

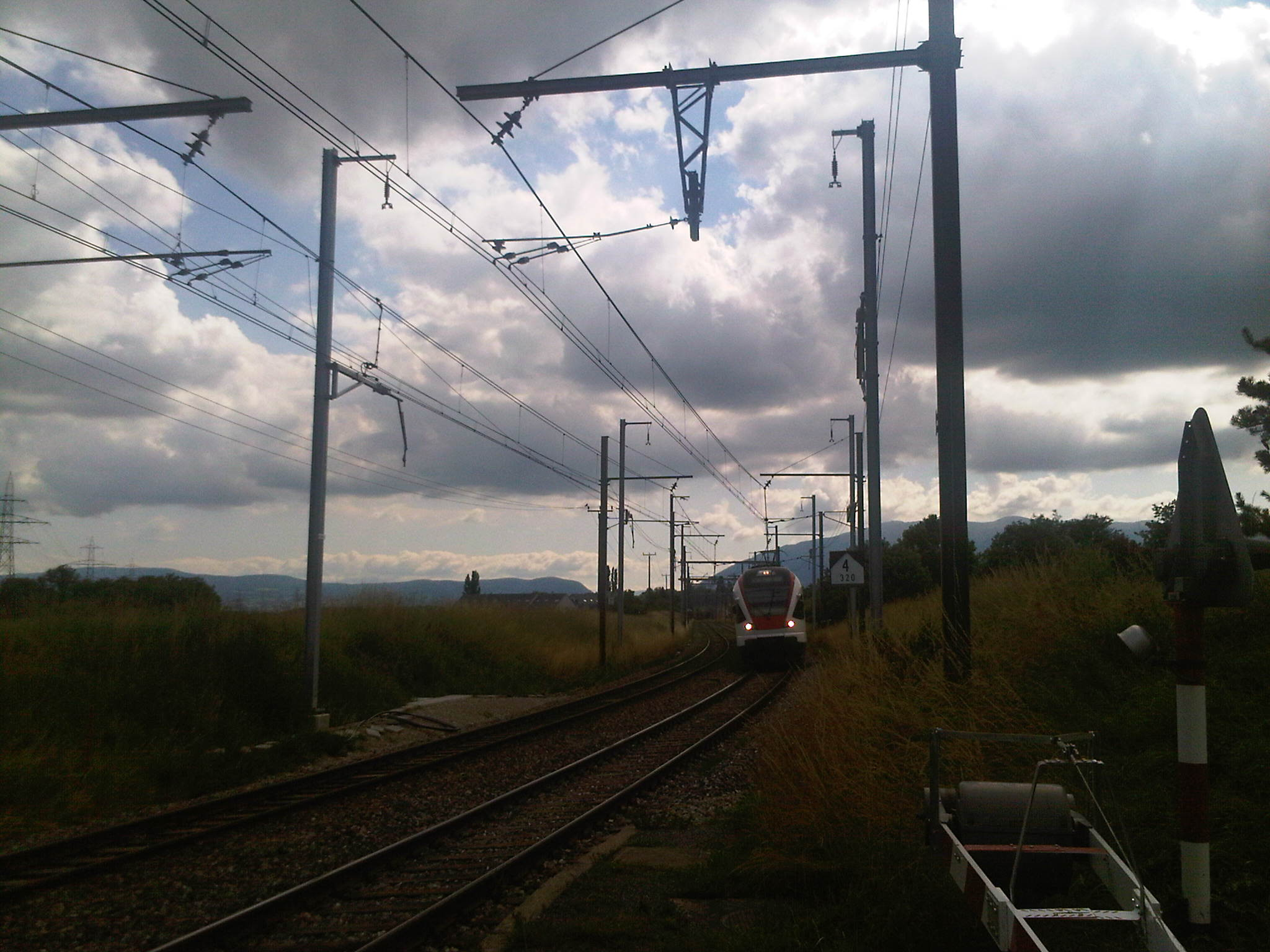
Masts in place for the future 25 kV overhead wires at Bourdigny looking toward Satigny. A Geneva bound FLIRT has just left Satigny

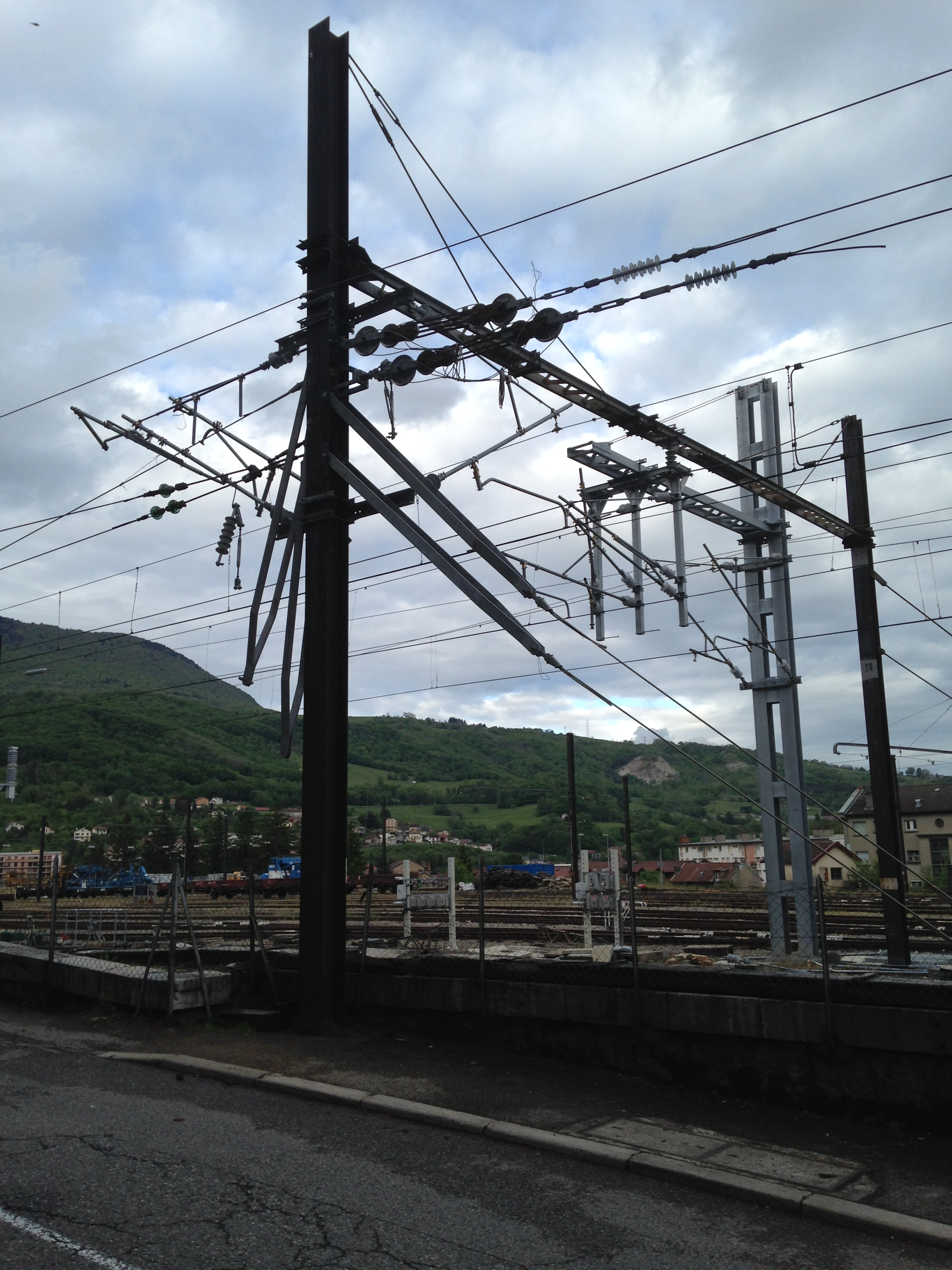
New 25 kV catenary at Bellegarde station

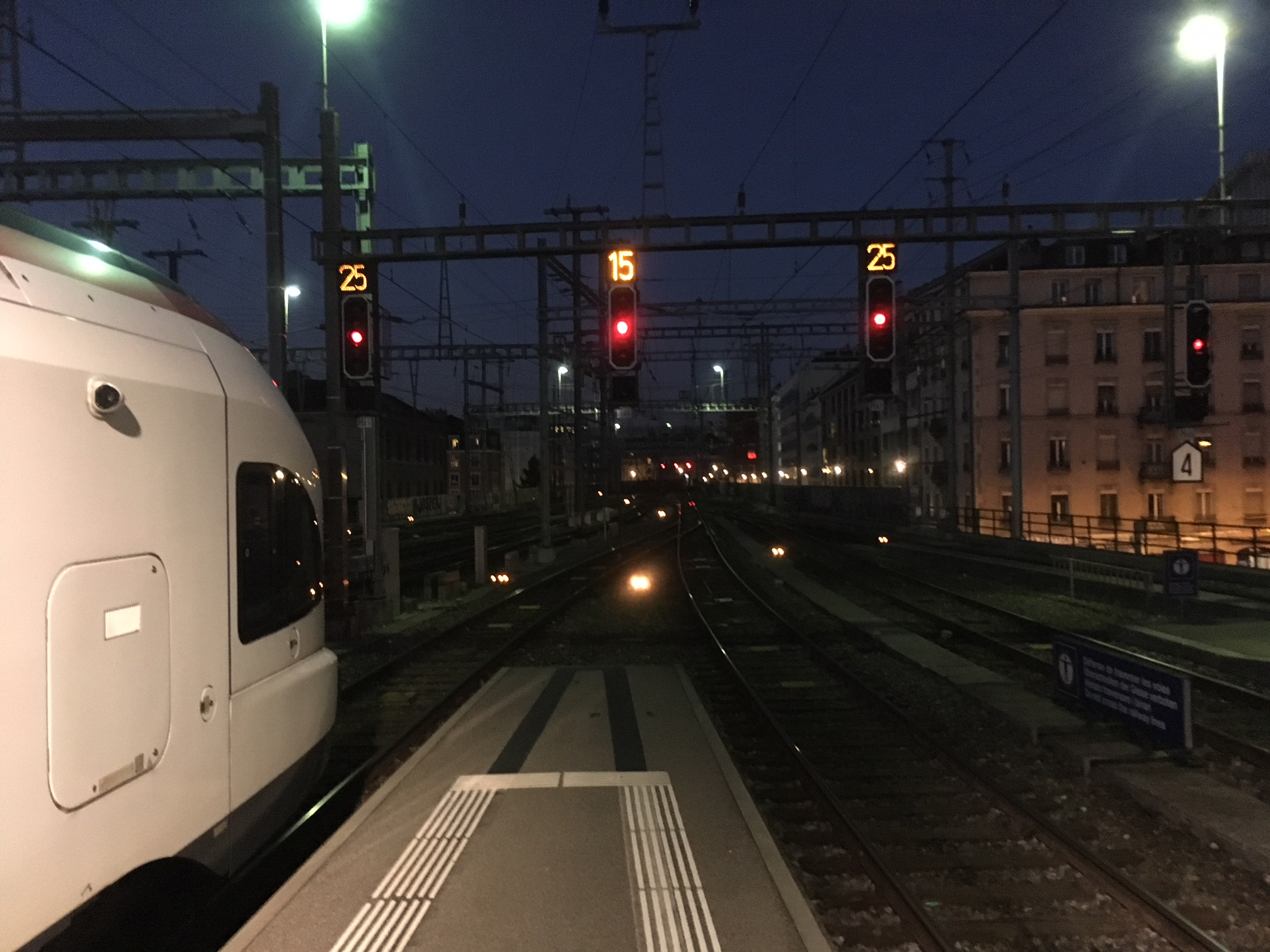
Voltage indicators on tracks 5, 6 and 7 westbound at Geneva station

==== Upgrade Project 2018 bigger platforms ====
All platforms will be lengthened to 160 m (520 ft) to allow for longer trains. The project was supposed to be finished by end 2019, with an estimated cost of 56mio CHF, financed by the Canton of Geneva. As of December 2022, most of the stations are complete.

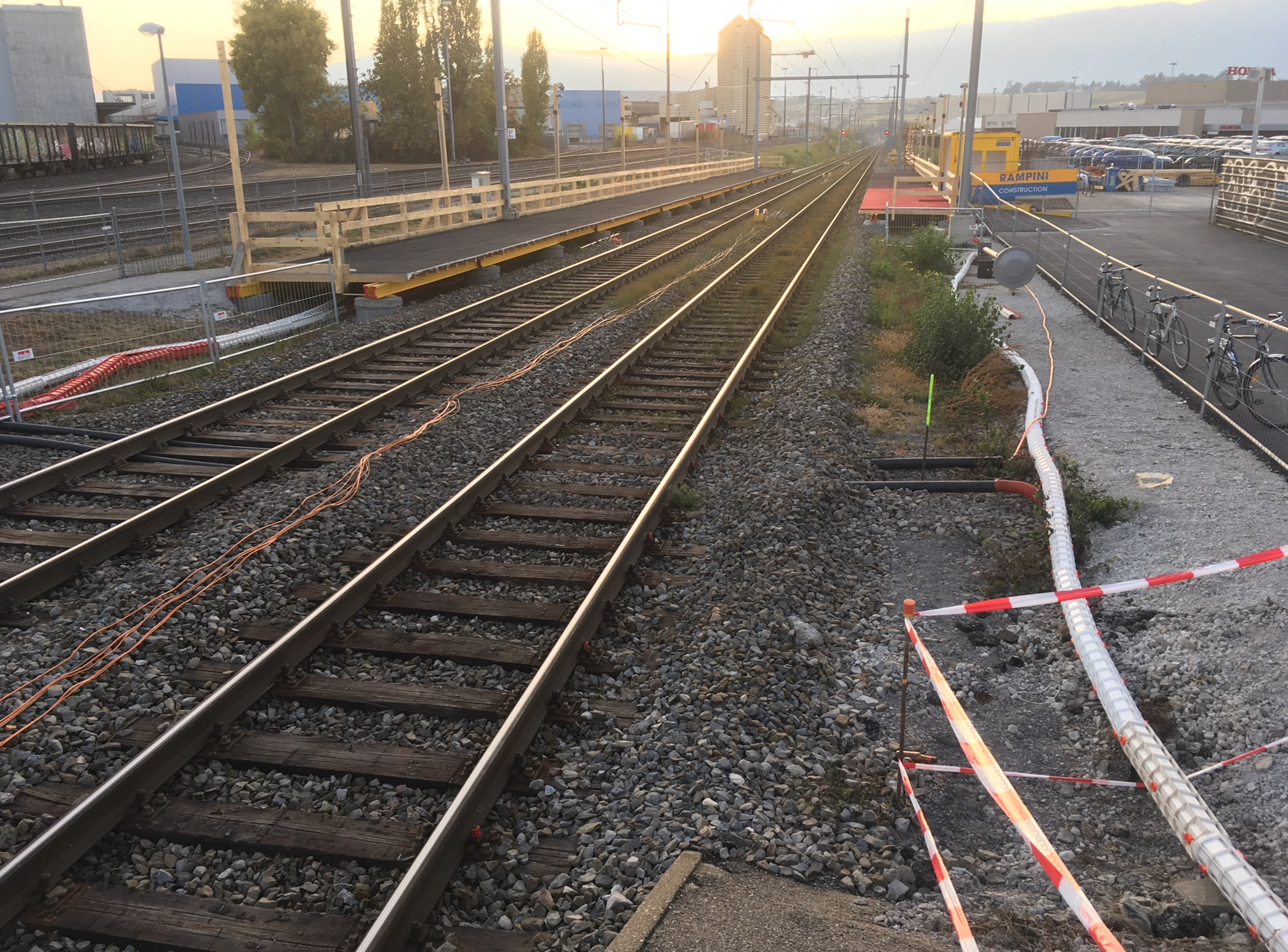
Gare Zimeysa temporary platforms Oct 2018

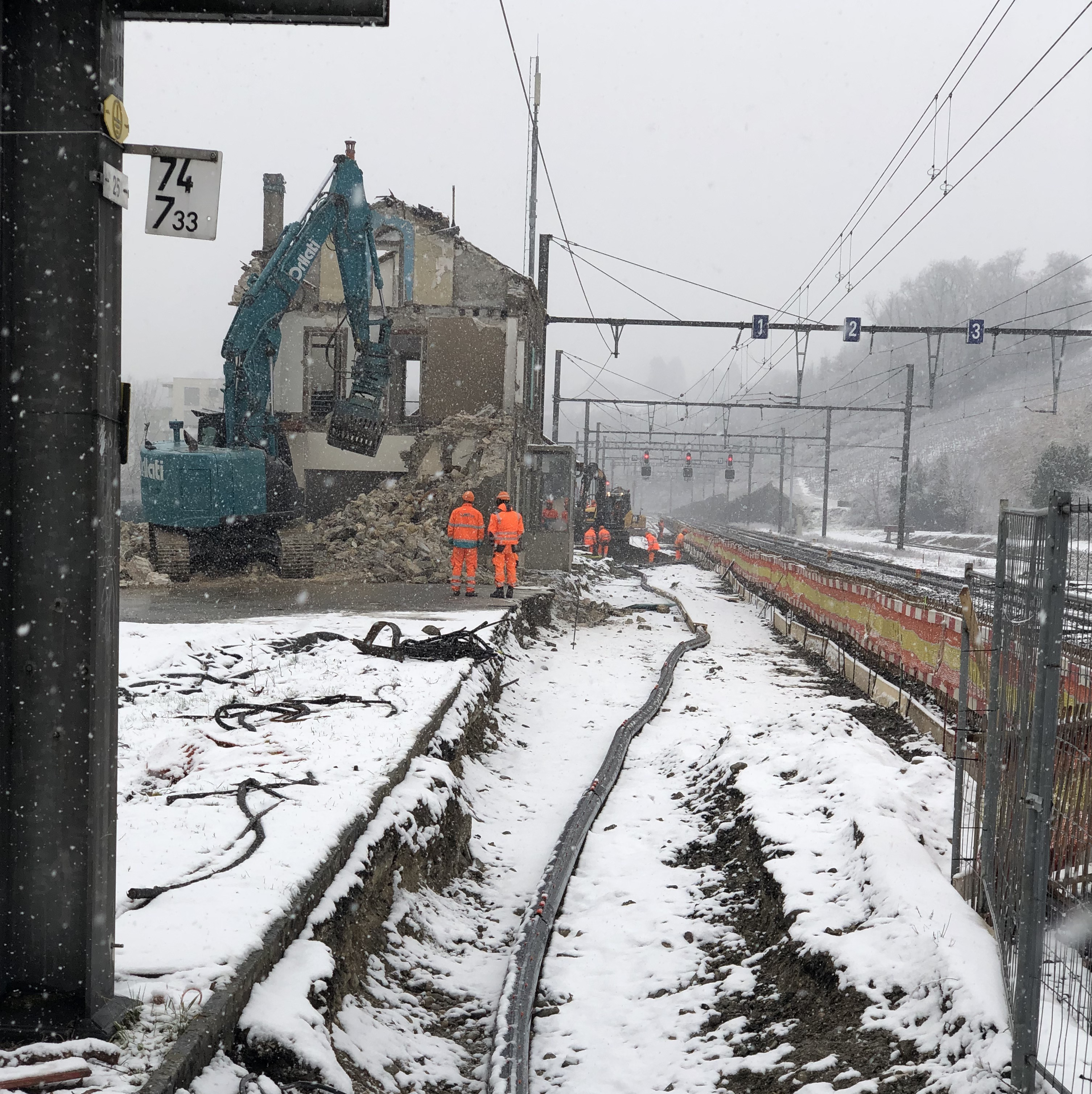
Demolition of la Plaine Station building January 2019

== See also ==
- History of civil works between Cornavin and la Plaine, Geneva cantonal archive (in French)
