= Creux-de-Genthod railway station =

Railway station in Genthod, Switzerland

Creux-de-Genthod
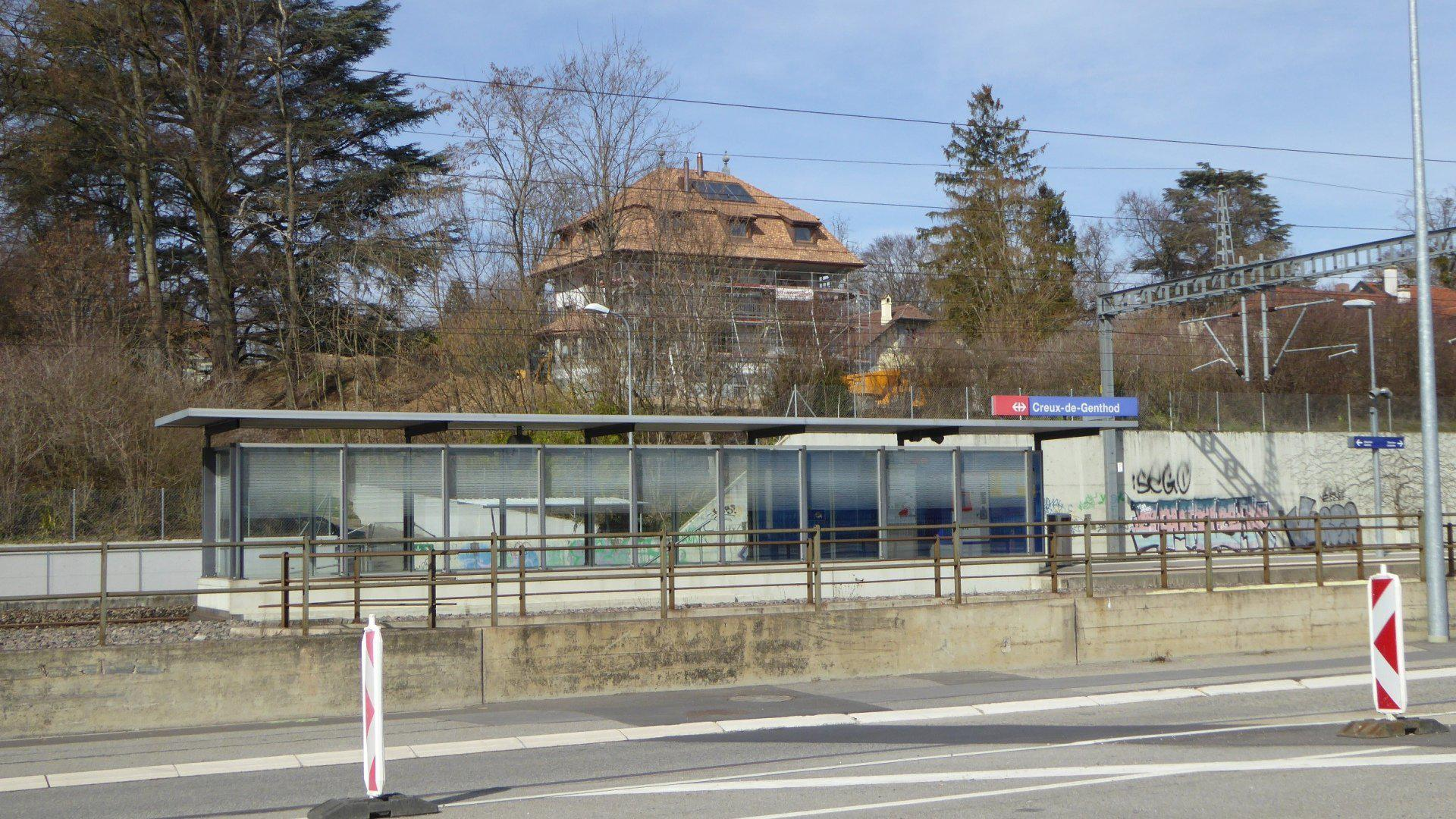
- The station platform in 2018

General information
- Location: Genthod; Switzerland
- Coordinates: 46°15′50″N 6°09′41″E
- Elevation: 386 m (1,266 ft)
- Owner: Swiss Federal Railways
- Line: Lausanne–Geneva line
- Distance: 53.8 km (33.4 mi) from Lausanne
- Platforms: 2 (1 island platform)
- Tracks: 4
- Train operators: Swiss Federal Railways
- Connections: tpg seasonal bus line

Construction
- Cycle facilities: Yes (11 spaces)
- Accessible: No

Other information
- Station code: 8501012 (CRGD)
- Fare zone: 10 (unireso)

Passengers
- 2023: 730 per weekday (SBB)

Services
Preceding station	Léman Express	Following station
Genthod-Bellevue towards Évian-les-Bains	L1	Versoix towards Coppet
Genthod-Bellevue towards Annecy	L2	Versoix towards Coppet
Genthod-Bellevue towards Saint-Gervais	L3	Versoix towards Coppet
Genthod-Bellevue towards Annemasse	L4	Versoix towards Coppet
Location
- Location within Switzerland Location within Canton of Geneva

Creux-de-Genthod railway station (French: Gare de Creux-de-Genthod) is a railway station in the municipality of Genthod, in the Swiss canton of Geneva. It is an intermediate stop on the standard gauge Lausanne–Geneva line of Swiss Federal Railways.

== Services ==
As of the December 2024 timetable change, the following services stop at Creux-de-Genthod:

- Léman Express L1 / L2 / L3 / L4: service every fifteen minutes between Coppet and Annemasse via Genève-Cornavin, from Annemasse every hour to Annecy, half-hourly or hourly service or service every two hours to Évian-les-Bains and every two hours to Saint-Gervais-les-Bains-Le Fayet.
