= Les Tuileries railway station =

Railway station in Bellevue, Switzerland

Les Tuileries
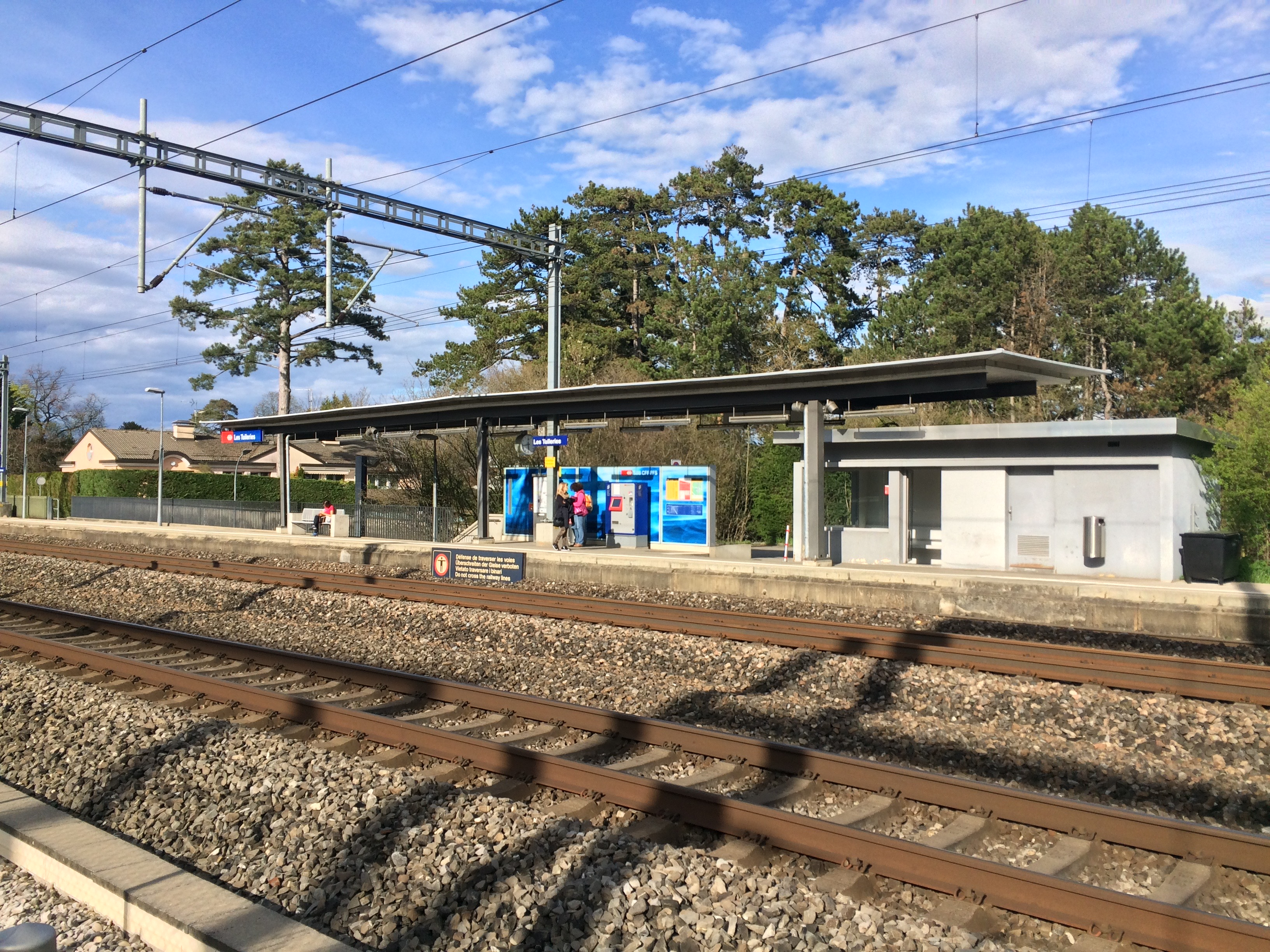
- The station platform in 2018

General information
- Location: Bellevue; Switzerland
- Coordinates: 46°15′00″N 6°08′50″E
- Elevation: 388 m (1,273 ft)
- Owner: Swiss Federal Railways
- Line: Lausanne–Geneva line
- Distance: 55.8 km (34.7 mi) from Lausanne
- Platforms: 1 side platform
- Tracks: 3
- Train operators: Swiss Federal Railways
- Connections: tpg bus line

Construction
- Parking: Yes (8 spaces)
- Cycle facilities: Yes (38 spaces)
- Accessible: Yes

Other information
- Station code: 8501011 (TUI)
- Fare zone: 10 (unireso)

Passengers
- 2023: 1'700 per weekday (SBB)

Services
Preceding station	Léman Express	Following station
Chambésy towards Évian-les-Bains	L1	Genthod-Bellevue towards Coppet
Chambésy towards Annecy	L2	Genthod-Bellevue towards Coppet
Chambésy towards Saint-Gervais	L3	Genthod-Bellevue towards Coppet
Chambésy towards Annemasse	L4	Genthod-Bellevue towards Coppet
Location
- Location within Switzerland Location within Canton of Geneva

Les Tuileries railway station (French: Gare des Tuileries) is a railway station in the municipality of Bellevue, in the Swiss canton of Geneva. It is an intermediate stop on the standard gauge Lausanne–Geneva line of Swiss Federal Railways.

== Services ==
As of the December 2024 timetable change, the following services stop at Les Tuileries:

- Léman Express L1 / L2 / L3 / L4: service every fifteen minutes between Coppet and Annemasse via Genève-Cornavin, from Annemasse every hour to Annecy, half-hourly or hourly service or service every two hours to Évian-les-Bains and every two hours to Saint-Gervais-les-Bains-Le Fayet.
