= Pont-Céard railway station =

Railway station in Versoix, Switzerland

Pont-Céard
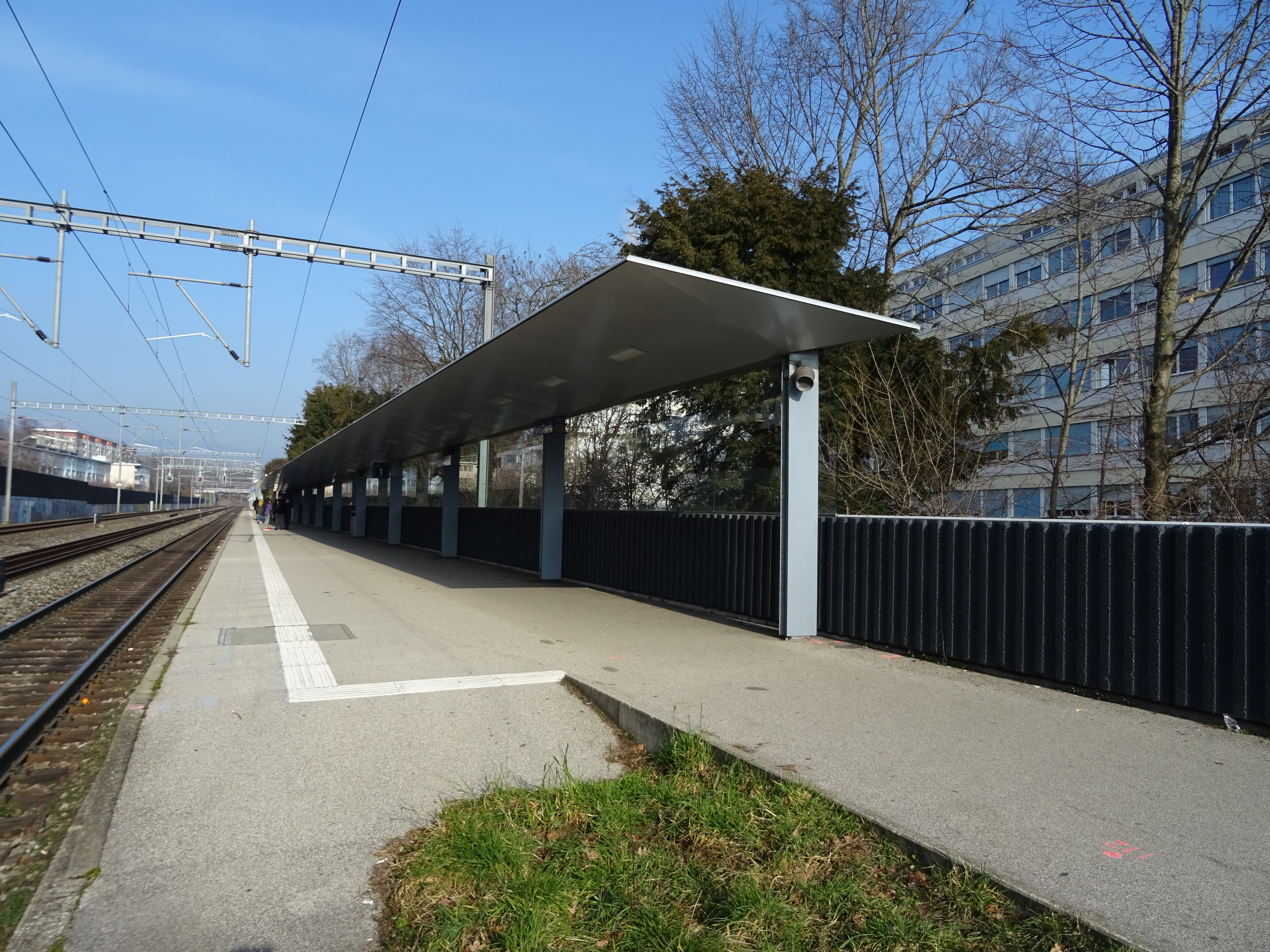
- The station platform in 2020

General information
- Location: Versoix; Switzerland
- Coordinates: 46°17′15″N 6°09′46″E
- Elevation: 392 m (1,286 ft)
- Owner: Swiss Federal Railways
- Line: Lausanne–Geneva line
- Distance: 51.1 km (31.8 mi) from Lausanne
- Platforms: 1 side platform
- Tracks: 3
- Train operators: Swiss Federal Railways
- Connections: tpg bus line

Construction
- Cycle facilities: Yes (37 spaces)
- Accessible: Yes

Other information
- Station code: 8501013 (PTC)
- Fare zone: 10 (unireso)

Passengers
- 2023: 4'500 per weekday (SBB)

Services
Preceding station	Léman Express	Following station
Versoix towards Évian-les-Bains	L1	Mies towards Coppet
Versoix towards Annecy	L2	Mies towards Coppet
Versoix towards Saint-Gervais	L3	Mies towards Coppet
Versoix towards Annemasse	L4	Mies towards Coppet
Location
- Location within Switzerland Location within Canton of Geneva

Pont-Céard railway station (French: Gare de Pont-Céard) is a railway station in the municipality of Versoix, in the Swiss canton of Geneva. It is an intermediate stop on the standard gauge Lausanne–Geneva line of Swiss Federal Railways.

== Services ==
As of the December 2024 timetable change, the following services stop at Pont-Céard:

- Léman Express L1 / L2 / L3 / L4: service every fifteen minutes between Coppet and Annemasse via Genève-Cornavin, from Annemasse every hour to Annecy, half-hourly or hourly service or service every two hours to Évian-les-Bains and every two hours to Saint-Gervais-les-Bains-Le Fayet.
