= Versoix railway station =

Railway station in Versoix, Switzerland

Versoix
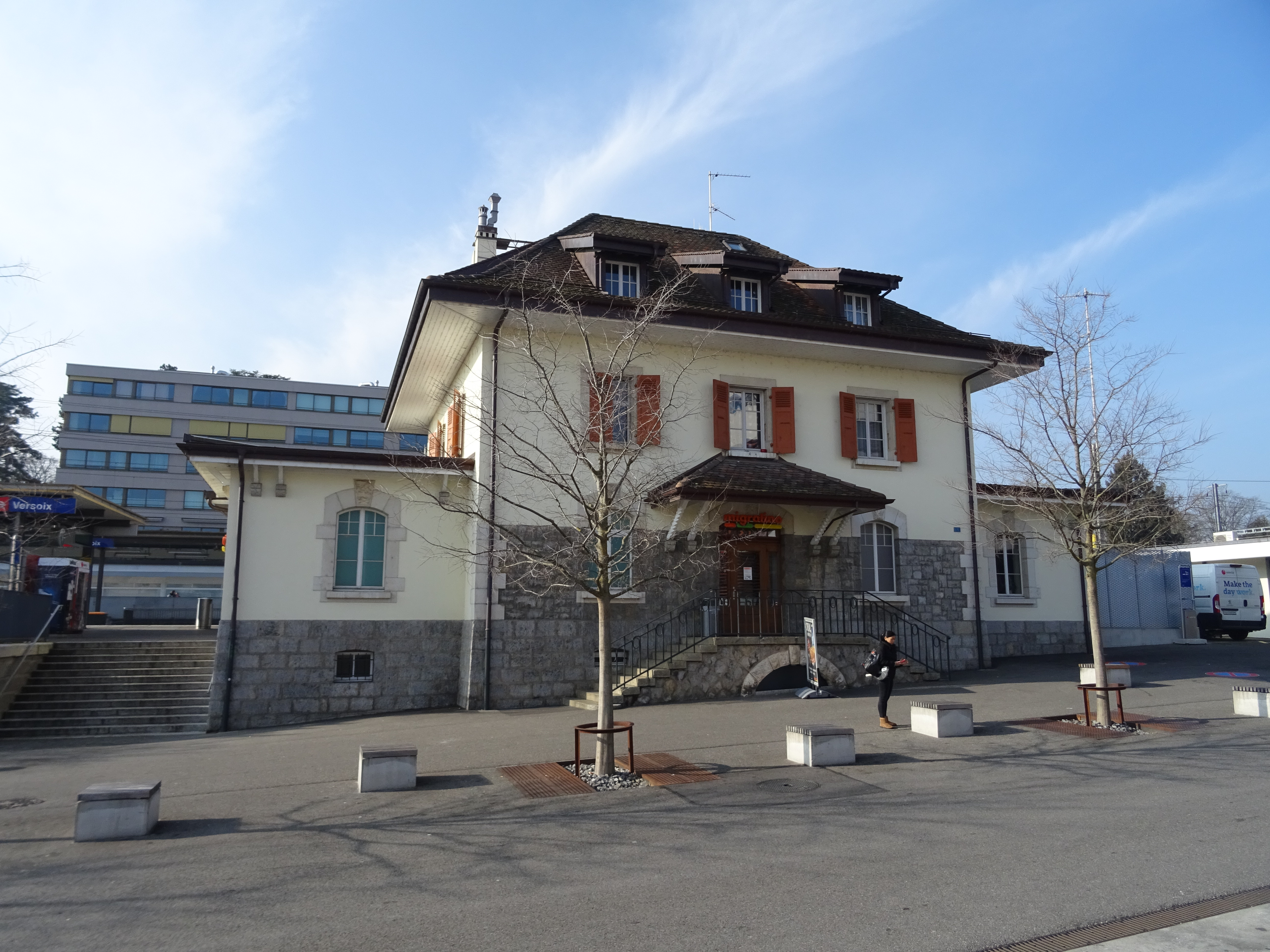
- The station building in 2020

General information
- Location: Versoix; Switzerland
- Coordinates: 46°16′47″N 6°09′57″E
- Elevation: 387 m (1,270 ft)
- Owner: Swiss Federal Railways
- Line: Lausanne–Geneva line
- Distance: 52.0 km (32.3 mi) from Lausanne
- Platforms: 3: 1 side platform; 1 island platform
- Tracks: 3
- Train operators: Swiss Federal Railways
- Connections: tpg bus lines

Construction
- Parking: Yes (20 spaces)
- Cycle facilities: Yes (171 places)
- Accessible: Yes

Other information
- Station code: 8501022 (VSX)
- Fare zone: 10 (unireso)

Passengers
- 2023: 5'100 per weekday (SBB)

Services
Preceding station	Léman Express	Following station
Creux-de-Genthod towards Évian-les-Bains	L1	Pont-Céard towards Coppet
Creux-de-Genthod towards Annecy	L2	Pont-Céard towards Coppet
Creux-de-Genthod towards Saint-Gervais	L3	Pont-Céard towards Coppet
Creux-de-Genthod towards Annemasse	L4	Pont-Céard towards Coppet
Location
- Location within Switzerland Location within Canton of Geneva

Versoix railway station (French: Gare de Versoix) is a railway station in the municipality of Versoix, in the Swiss canton of Geneva. It is an intermediate stop on the standard gauge Lausanne–Geneva line of Swiss Federal Railways.

== Services ==
As of the December 2024 timetable change, the following services stop at Versoix:

- Léman Express L1 / L2 / L3 / L4: service every fifteen minutes between Coppet and Annemasse via Genève-Cornavin, from Annemasse every hour to Annecy, half-hourly or hourly service or service every two hours to Évian-les-Bains and every two hours to Saint-Gervais-les-Bains-Le Fayet.
