= Genthod-Bellevue railway station =

Railway station in Genthod, Switzerland

Genthod-Bellevue
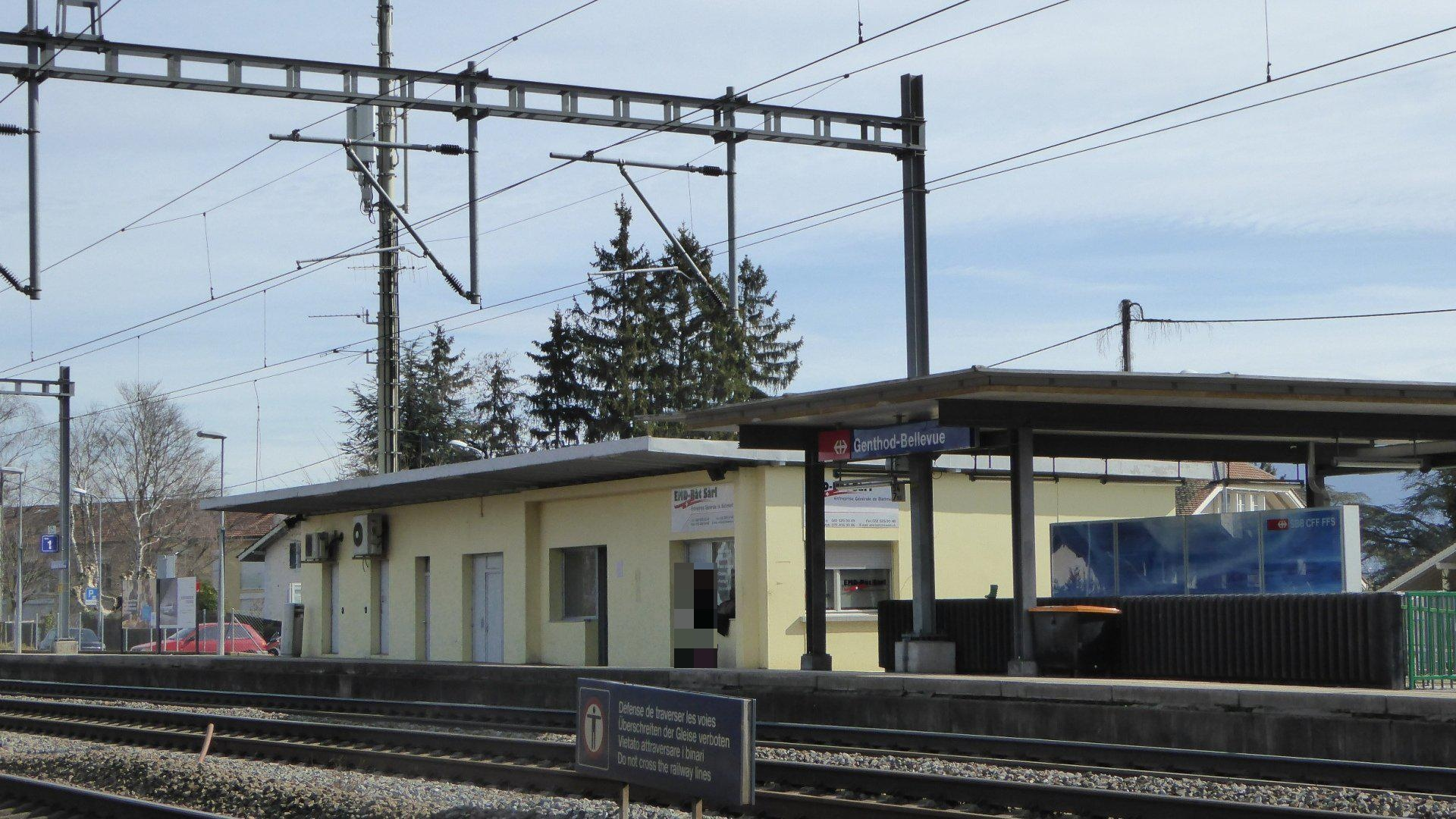
- The station platform in 2018

General information
- Location: Genthod; Switzerland
- Coordinates: 46°15′24″N 6°09′14″E
- Elevation: 385 m (1,263 ft)
- Owner: Swiss Federal Railways
- Line: Lausanne–Geneva line
- Distance: 54.8 km (34.1 mi) from Lausanne
- Platforms: 1 side platform
- Tracks: 3
- Train operators: Swiss Federal Railways
- Connections: tpg bus line

Construction
- Parking: Yes (70 spaces)
- Cycle facilities: Yes (35 spaces)
- Accessible: No

Other information
- Station code: 8501021 (GDBE)
- Fare zone: 10 (unireso)

Passengers
- 2023: 2'200 per weekday (SBB)

Services
Preceding station	Léman Express	Following station
Les Tuileries towards Évian-les-Bains	L1	Creux-de-Genthod towards Coppet
Les Tuileries towards Annecy	L2	Creux-de-Genthod towards Coppet
Les Tuileries towards Saint-Gervais	L3	Creux-de-Genthod towards Coppet
Les Tuileries towards Annemasse	L4	Creux-de-Genthod towards Coppet
Location
- Location within Switzerland Location within Canton of Geneva

Genthod-Bellevue railway station (French: Gare de Genthod-Bellevue) is a railway station in the municipality of Genthod, in the Swiss canton of Geneva. It is an intermediate stop on the standard gauge Lausanne–Geneva line of Swiss Federal Railways.

== Services ==
As of the December 2024 timetable change, the following services stop at Genthod-Bellevue:

- Léman Express L1 / L2 / L3 / L4: service every fifteen minutes between Coppet and Annemasse via Genève-Cornavin, from Annemasse every hour to Annecy, half-hourly or hourly service or service every two hours to Évian-les-Bains and every two hours to Saint-Gervais-les-Bains-Le Fayet.
