= Chambésy railway station =

Railway station in Pregny-Chambésy, Switzerland

Chambésy
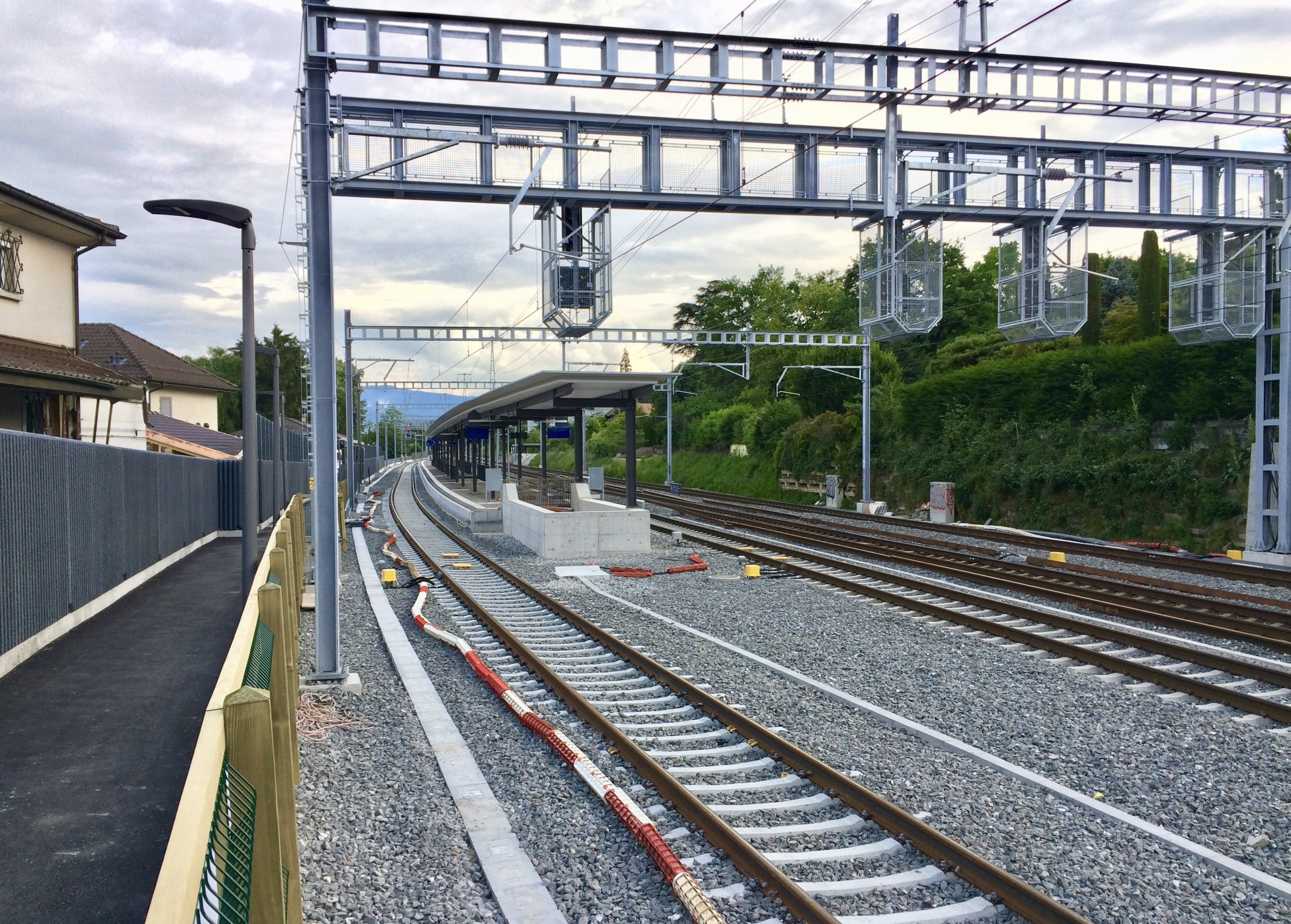
- The station platform in 2018

General information
- Location: Pregny-Chambésy; Switzerland
- Coordinates: 46°14′27″N 6°08′50″E
- Elevation: 390 m (1,280 ft)
- Owner: Swiss Federal Railways
- Line: Lausanne–Geneva line
- Distance: 56.6 km (35.2 mi) from Lausanne
- Platforms: 2 (1 island platform)
- Tracks: 4
- Train operators: Swiss Federal Railways
- Connections: tpg bus line

Construction
- Parking: Yes (6 spaces)
- Cycle facilities: Yes (12 spaces)
- Accessible: Partly

Other information
- Station code: 8501020 (CHY)
- Fare zone: 10 (unireso)

Passengers
- 2023: 1'000 per weekday (SBB)

Services
Preceding station	Léman Express	Following station
Genève-Sécheron towards Évian-les-Bains	L1	Les Tuileries towards Coppet
Genève-Sécheron towards Annecy	L2	Les Tuileries towards Coppet
Genève-Sécheron towards Saint-Gervais	L3	Les Tuileries towards Coppet
Genève-Sécheron towards Annemasse	L4	Les Tuileries towards Coppet
Location
- Location within Switzerland Location within Canton of Geneva

Chambésy railway station (French: Gare de Chambésy) is a railway station in the municipality of Pregny-Chambésy, in the Swiss canton of Geneva. It is an intermediate stop on the standard gauge Lausanne–Geneva line of Swiss Federal Railways.

== Services ==
As of the December 2024 timetable change, the following services stop at Chambésy:

- Léman Express L1 / L2 / L3 / L4: service every fifteen minutes between Coppet and Annemasse via Genève-Cornavin, from Annemasse every hour to Annecy, half-hourly or hourly service or service every two hours to Évian-les-Bains and every two hours to Saint-Gervais-les-Bains-Le Fayet.
