= Genève-Sécheron railway station =

Railway station in Geneva, Switzerland

Genève-Sécheron
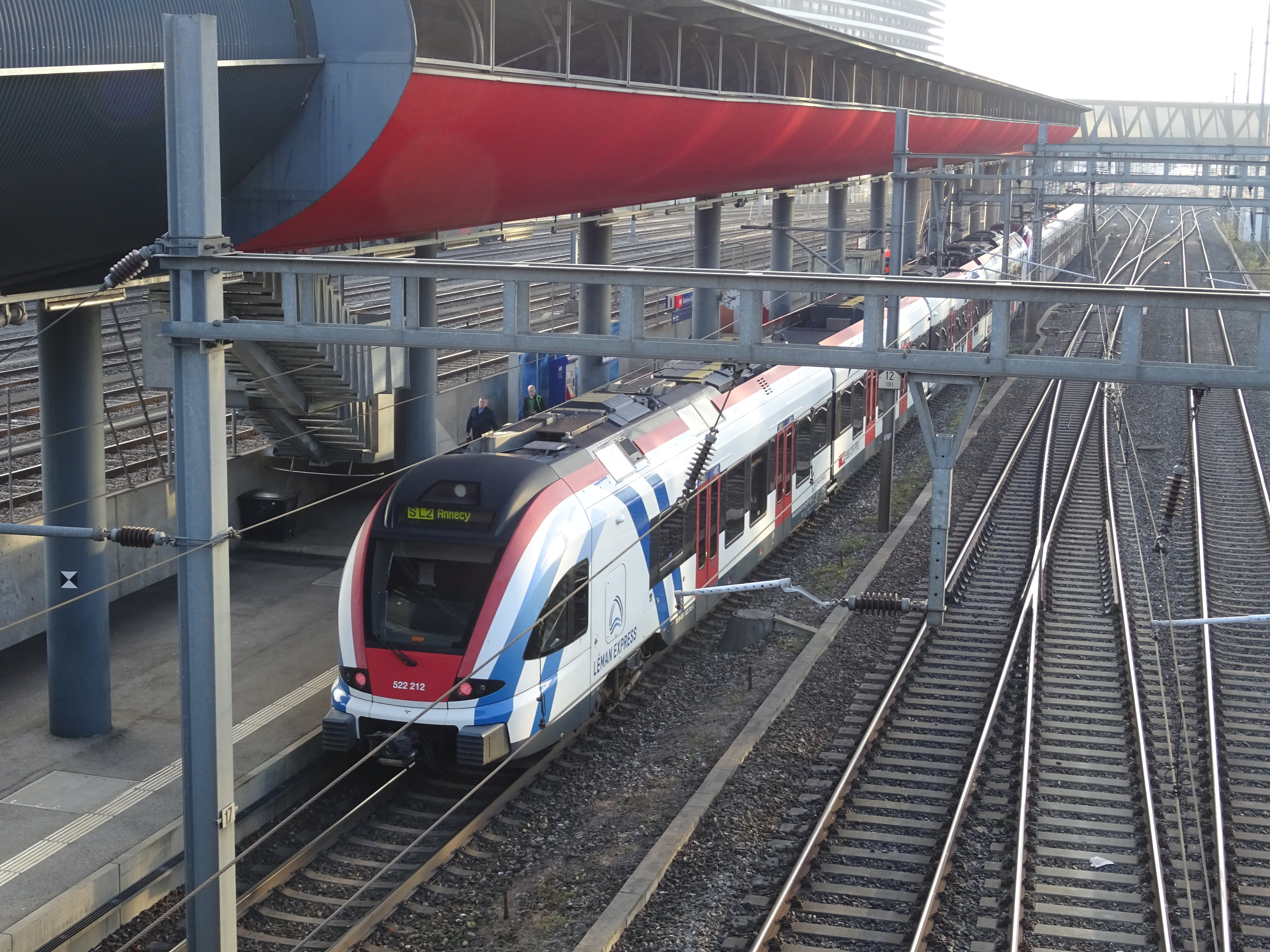
- The station platform and distinctive passenger walkway in 2020

General information
- Location: Geneva; Switzerland
- Coordinates: 46°13′21″N 6°08′40″E
- Elevation: 390 m (1,280 ft)
- Owner: Swiss Federal Railways
- Line: Lausanne–Geneva line
- Distance: 59.0 km (36.7 mi) from Lausanne
- Platforms: 1 side platform
- Tracks: 3
- Train operators: Swiss Federal Railways
- Connections: tpg bus lines

Construction
- Cycle facilities: Yes (105 spaces)
- Accessible: Yes

Other information
- Station code: 8516283 (GESE)
- Fare zone: 10 (unireso)

Passengers
- 2023: 2'900 per weekday (SBB)

Services
Preceding station	Léman Express	Following station
Genève-Cornavin towards Évian-les-Bains	L1	Chambésy towards Coppet
Genève-Cornavin towards Annecy	L2	Chambésy towards Coppet
Genève-Cornavin towards Saint-Gervais	L3	Chambésy towards Coppet
Genève-Cornavin towards Annemasse	L4	Chambésy towards Coppet
Location
- Location within Switzerland Location within Canton of Geneva

Genève-Sécheron railway station (French: Gare de Genève-Sécheron) is a railway station in the municipality of Geneva, in the Swiss canton of Geneva. It is an intermediate stop on the standard gauge Lausanne–Geneva line of Swiss Federal Railways.

== Services ==
As of the December 2024 timetable change, the following services stop at Genève-Sécheron:

- Léman Express L1 / L2 / L3 / L4: service every fifteen minutes between Coppet and Annemasse via Genève-Cornavin, from Annemasse every hour to Annecy, half-hourly or hourly service or service every two hours to Évian-les-Bains and every two hours to Saint-Gervais-les-Bains-Le Fayet.

== Project ==
The canton de Genève plans a cross-border metro line, the Jura – Léman – Salève, potentially operational in the 2040s. While the canton plans to connect it to the SBB (Swiss Federal Railways) network at Sécheron and Eaux-Vives, an advisory committee established by the canton is requesting that this connection be made at Cornavin Station instead.
