= Mies railway station =

Railway station in Mies, Switzerland

Mies
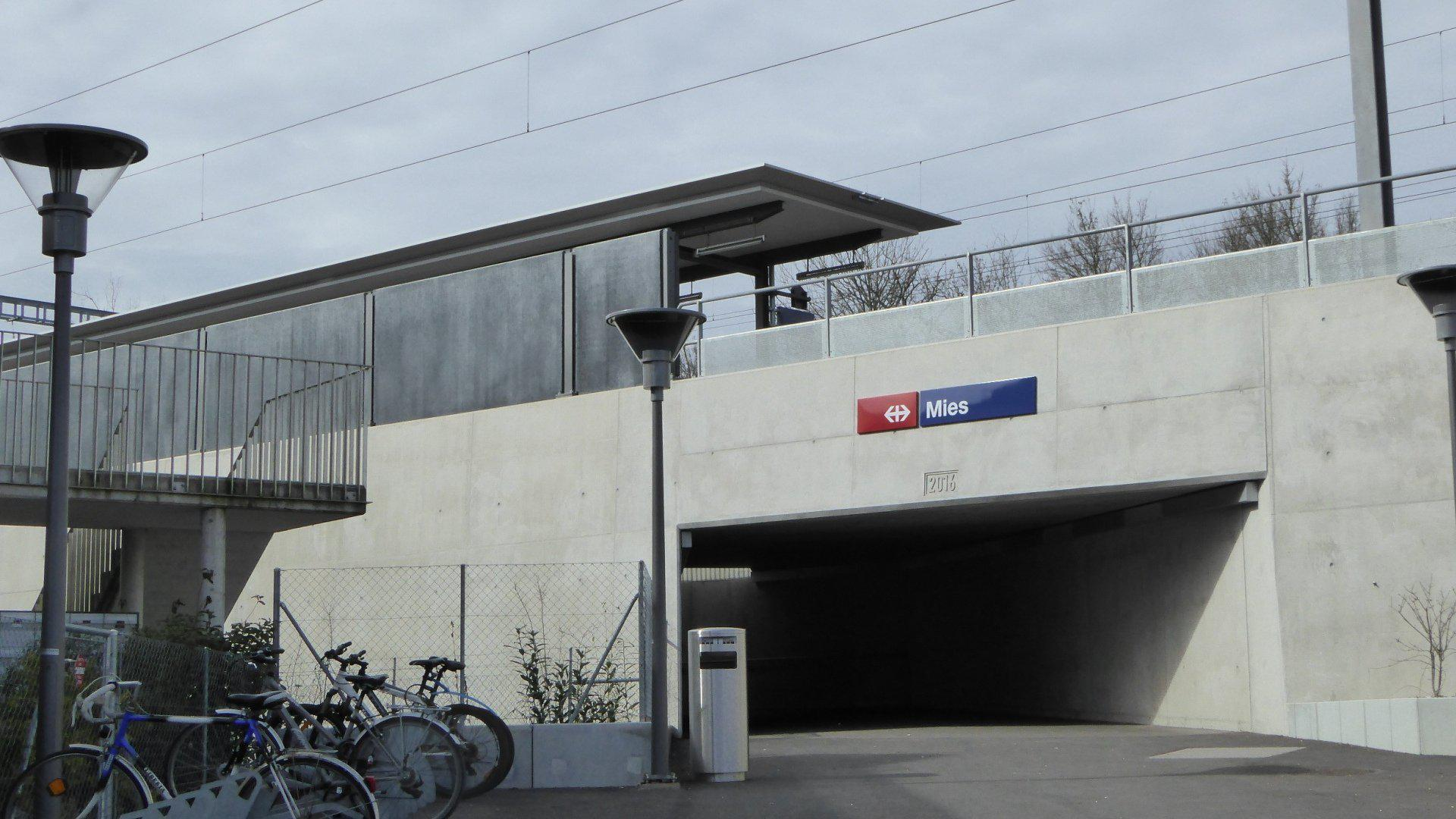
- The station in 2018

General information
- Location: Mies; Switzerland
- Coordinates: 46°18′00″N 6°10′10″E
- Elevation: 396 m (1,299 ft)
- Owner: Swiss Federal Railways
- Line: Lausanne–Geneva line
- Distance: 49.5 km (30.8 mi) from Lausanne
- Platforms: 2 (1 island platform)
- Tracks: 4
- Train operators: Swiss Federal Railways
- Connections: TPN night bus line

Construction
- Parking: Yes (22 spaces)
- Cycle facilities: Yes (28 spaces)
- Accessible: Yes

Other information
- Station code: 8501014 (MIES)
- Fare zone: 22 (mobilis)

Passengers
- 2023: 1'000 per weekday (SBB)

Services
Preceding station	Léman Express	Following station
Pont-Céard towards Évian-les-Bains	L1	Tannay towards Coppet
Pont-Céard towards Annecy	L2	Tannay towards Coppet
Pont-Céard towards Saint-Gervais	L3	Tannay towards Coppet
Pont-Céard towards Annemasse	L4	Tannay towards Coppet
Location
- Location within Switzerland Location within Canton of Vaud

Mies railway station (French: Gare de Mies) is a railway station in the municipality of Mies, in the Swiss canton of Vaud. It is an intermediate stop on the standard gauge Lausanne–Geneva line of Swiss Federal Railways.

== Services ==
As of the December 2024 timetable change, the following services stop at Mies:

- Léman Express L1 / L2 / L3 / L4: service every fifteen minutes between Coppet and Annemasse via Genève-Cornavin, from Annemasse every hour to Annecy, half-hourly or hourly service or service every two hours to Évian-les-Bains and every two hours to Saint-Gervais-les-Bains-Le Fayet.
