= Thonon-les-Bains station =

Railway station in Thonon-les-Bains, France

Thonon-les-Bains
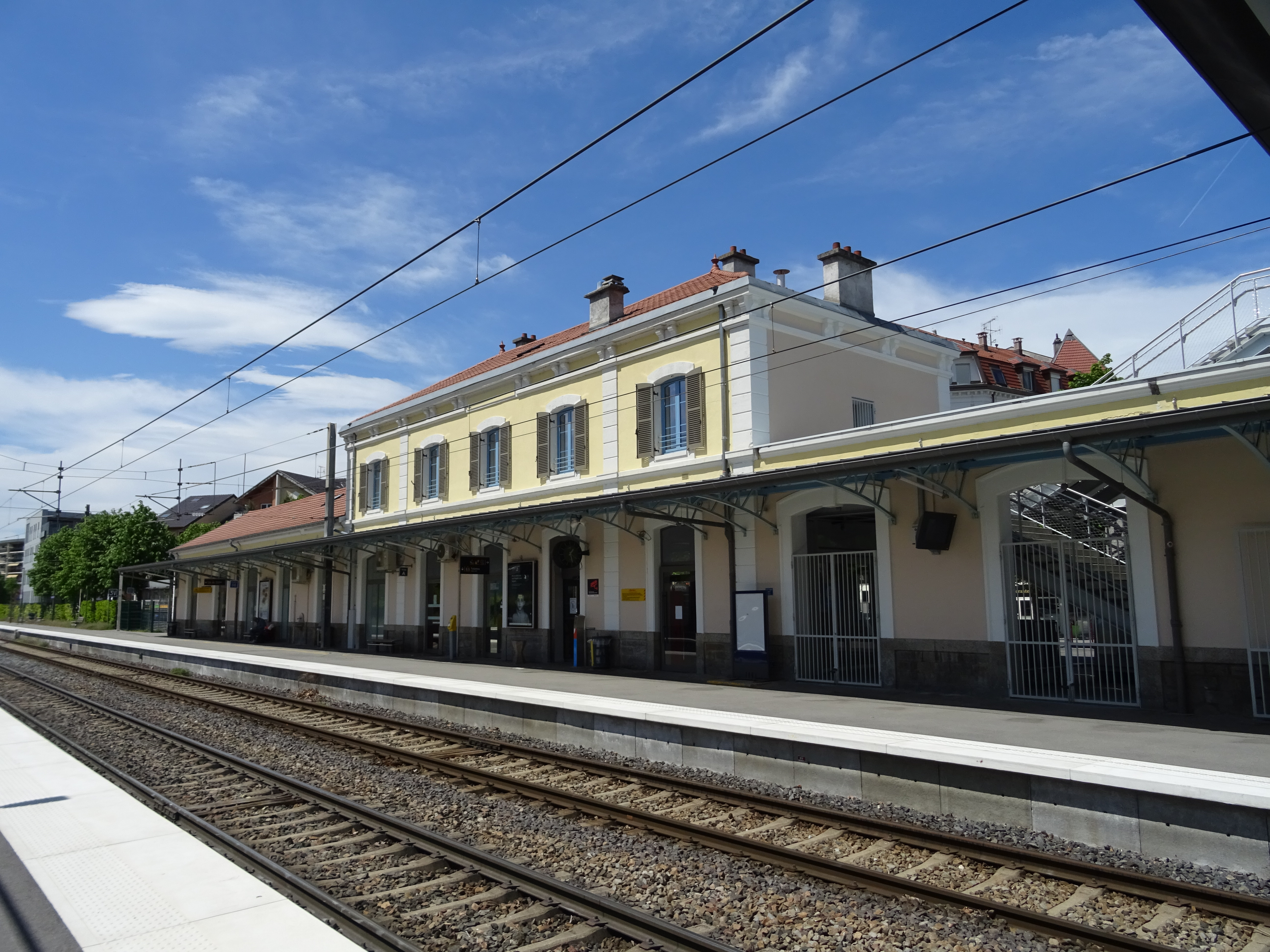
- Thonon-les-Bains railway station

General information
- Location: 1 Place de la Gare; 74200 Thonon-les-Bains; Haute-Savoie; France
- Coordinates: 46°22′09″N 6°28′57″E
- Elevation: 436 m (1,430 ft)
- Line: Longeray-Léaz–Le Bouveret railway
- Platforms: 2
- Tracks: 4

History
- Opened: 30 August 1880

Services
Preceding station	SNCF	Following station
Annemasse towards Paris-Lyon	TGV inOui Weekends and holidays	Évian-les-Bains Terminus
Preceding station	Léman Express	Following station
Perrignier towards Coppet	L1	Évian-les-Bains Terminus
Preceding station	TER Auvergne-Rhône-Alpes	Following station
Perrignier towards Lyon-Part-Dieu	3	Évian-les-Bains Terminus
Location
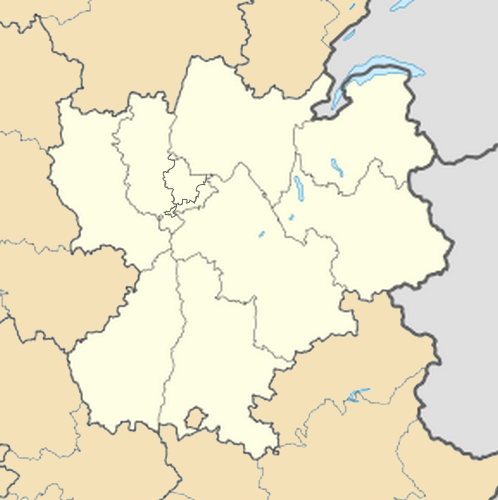
- Location within Auvergne-Rhône-Alpes Location within Rhône-Alpes Location within France

Thonon-les-Bains ([tɔnɔ̃ le bɛ̃]; French: Gare de Thonon-les-Bains) is a railway station in Thonon-les-Bains, Haute-Savoie, southeastern France. The station was opened in 1880 and is located on the Longeray-Léaz–Le Bouveret railway. The train services are operated by SNCF (TGV and TER; jointly with CFF for the Léman Express service).

== Train services ==
The following train services serve the station as of 2022:

- High speed services (TGV inOui) Paris - Bellegarde - Annemasse - Évian-les-Bains
- Regional services (TER Auvergne-Rhône-Alpes) (Lyon -) Bellegarde - Annemasse - Évian-les-Bains
- Regional services (Léman Express) Coppet - Geneva - Annemasse - Évian-les-Bains
