= Genève-Cornavin railway station =

Railway station in Geneva, Switzerland

Geneva Genève
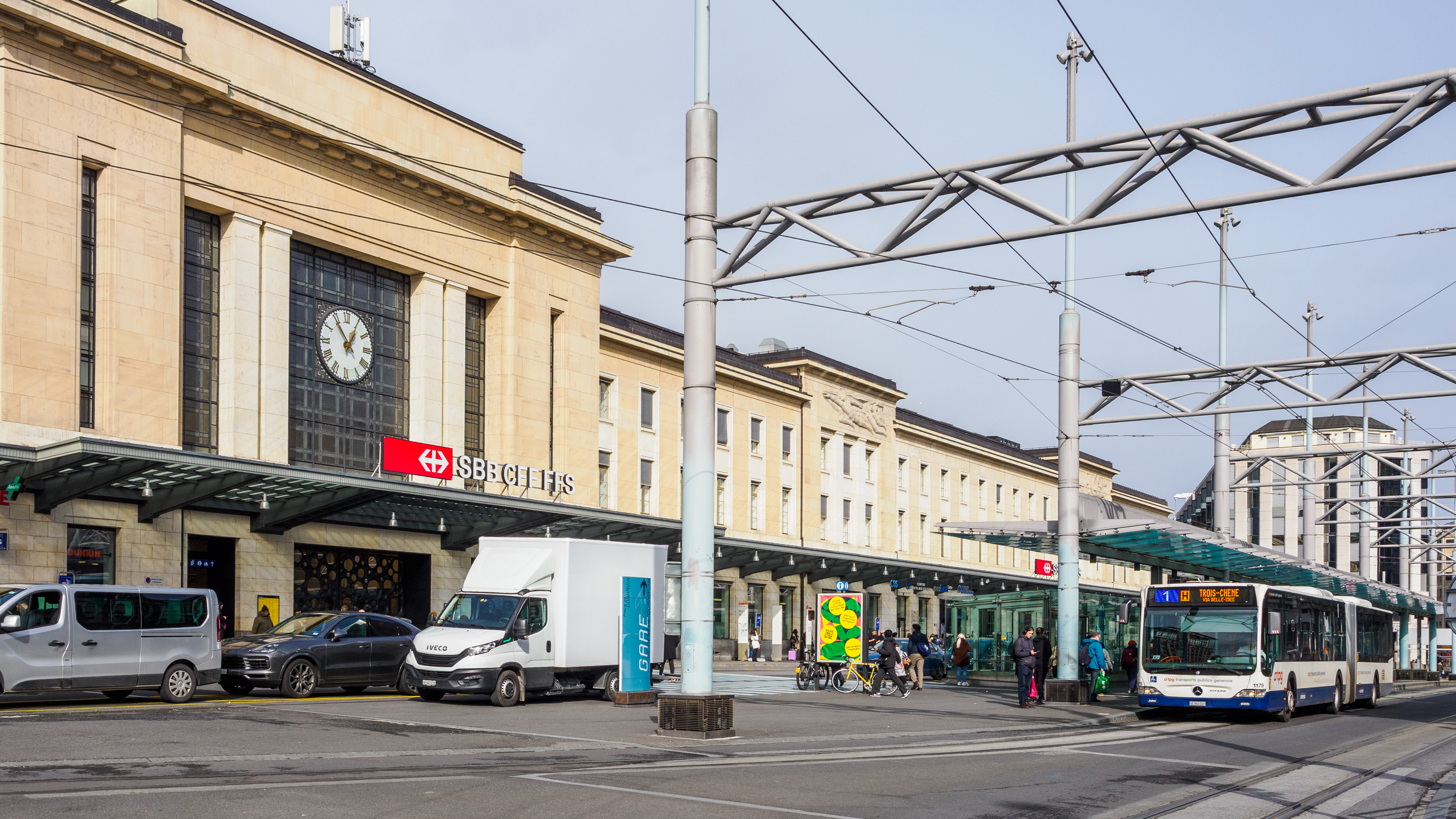
- Cornavin station: main entrance with tram and bus station

General information
- Location: Geneva; Switzerland
- Coordinates: 46°12′37″N 6°08′33″E
- Elevation: 392 m (1,286 ft)
- Owner: Swiss Federal Railways
- Lines: CEVA line; Lausanne–Geneva line; Lyon–Geneva line
- Distance: 60.3 km (37.5 mi) from Lausanne
- Platforms: 8: 3 island platforms; 1 side platform; 1 bay platform
- Tracks: 8
- Train operators: SNCF; Swiss Federal Railways
- Connections: tpg
- Tram: Tram lines
- Trolleybus: trolleybus lines
- Bus: bus lines

Construction
- Parking: Yes
- Cycle facilities: Yes (480 spaces)
- Accessible: Platforms 1-5 and 10
- Architect: Julien Flegenheimer (1931)

Other information
- Station code: 8501008 (GE)
- IATA code: ZHT
- Fare zone: 10 (unireso)

History
- Opened: 1858
- Rebuilt: 1931; 2010-2014 (reconstruction)
- Former names: Geneva Cornavain

Passengers
- 2025: 83,100 per day (SBB)
- Rank: 8 out of 1,095
Services
Preceding station	SBB CFF FFS	Following station
Terminus	EuroCity	Lausanne towards Milano Centrale or Venezia Santa Lucia
Geneva Airport Terminus	IC 1	Renens VD towards St. Gallen
Geneva Airport Terminus	IR 15	Nyon towards Lucerne
Geneva Airport Terminus	IR 57	Nyon towards Neuchâtel
Geneva Airport Terminus	IR 90	Renens VD towards Brig
Geneva Airport Terminus	IR 95	Nyon towards Brig
Lancy-Pont-Rouge towards Annemasse	RE33	Coppet towards St-Maurice or Martigny
Geneva Airport Terminus	RE33	Coppet towards St-Maurice or Martigny
Preceding station	TGV Lyria	Following station
Bellegarde towards Paris-Lyon	Paris to Geneva	Terminus
Bellegarde towards Paris-Lyon	Paris to Lausanne	Lausanne Terminus
Bellegarde towards Marseille-Saint-Charles	Marseille to Lausanne	Lausanne Terminus
Preceding station	TER Auvergne-Rhône-Alpes	Following station
Bellegarde towards Valence	2	Terminus
Bellegarde towards Lyon-Part-Dieu	3	Terminus
Bellegarde towards Chambéry	51	Terminus
Preceding station	Léman Express	Following station
Lancy-Pont-Rouge towards Évian-les-Bains	L1	Genève-Sécheron towards Coppet
Lancy-Pont-Rouge towards Annecy	L2	Genève-Sécheron towards Coppet
Lancy-Pont-Rouge towards Saint-Gervais	L3	Genève-Sécheron towards Coppet
Lancy-Pont-Rouge towards Annemasse	L4	Genève-Sécheron towards Coppet
Vernier towards La Plaine	L5	Terminus
Vernier towards Bellegarde	L6	Terminus
Preceding station	Venice Simplon-Orient-Express	Following station
Innsbruck towards London Victoria	London–Paris–Rome	Venice Terminus
Location
- Location within Switzerland Location within Canton of Geneva

Geneva railway station (French: Gare de Genève), also known as Geneva Cornavin railway station, is Geneva's main train station, located in Cornavin area; both names can be used interchangeably.

It connects the Lausanne–Geneva line (15 kV at 16.7 Hz AC) to the east with the Lyon-Geneva line (25 kV at 50 Hz AC), which goes westwards to France and, for the first few kilometers, runs as a single track line alongside the double-track line to the airport, where most long-distance trains from the rest of Switzerland terminate. Traffic to France goes through Bellegarde border station and includes long-distance TGVs to Paris and southern France and regional express trains to Lyon. Cornavin is also the hub of the Léman Express network, with six routes in service, many of which travel over the newly opened CEVA, which leads to Annemasse on its eastbound axis, and towards La Plaine (L5) and Bellegarde (L6) on its westbound axis.

The third largest train station in Switzerland by passenger numbers behind Zürich HB and Bern, with 156,000 users on average per working day in 2022, it sees over 720 train departures every day from its eight through-platforms. Platforms 6 and 7 have French and Swiss border controls. Facilities at the station include a police station, a pharmacy, several supermarkets, coffee shops, bakeries, food stands, clothing shops and multiple other establishments.

== Planned extension ==
A new platform opened on 27 September 1984 serving lines 7 and 8 devoted to traffic to and from France.

In 2012, the Swiss Federal Railways announced they would construct two new tracks to extend the station due to the planned increase in traffic. The initial project cost 800 million Swiss francs and involved the demolition of 350 dwellings next to the station. In 2013, a second project supported by the "Collectif 500", a neighborhood association planned to build the two new tracks under the station with a total cost around 1.7 billion Swiss francs. In April 2013, an initiative was launched to claim the extension under the station.

The Jura-Léman-Salève rail link would be a cross-border metro line, potentially operational in the 2040s. While the canton plans to connect it to the Swiss Federal Railways network at Sécheron and Eaux-Vives, an advisory committee is requesting that this connection has to be made at Cornavin Station instead.

== Services ==
As of the December 2024 timetable change, the following services stop at Geneva:

- TGV Lyria:
  - service every two hours to Paris-Lyon.
  - three trains per day to Lausanne.
  - one daily round-trip between Marseille-Saint-Charles and Lausanne in the summer.
- EuroCity: four trains per day to Milano Centrale, with one train continuing from Milano Centrale to Venezia Santa Lucia.
- InterCity: hourly service between Geneva Airport and St. Gallen via Zürich Hauptbahnhof.
- InterRegio:
  - half-hourly service between Geneva Airport and Brig.
  - hourly service between Geneva Airport and Lucerne.
  - limited service between Geneva Airport and Neuchâtel.
- TER: service to Valence-Ville, Lyon-Part-Dieu, Bellegarde, and Chambéry-Challes-les-Eaux.
- RegioExpress: half-hourly service (hourly on weekends) between Annemasse and St-Maurice, and hourly service from St-Maurice to Martigny. On weekends, hourly service to Geneva Airport.
- Léman Express:
  - L1 / L2 / L3 / L4: service every fifteen minutes between Coppet and Annemasse; from Annemasse every hour to Annecy, half-hourly or hourly service or service every two hours to Évian-les-Bains and every two hours to Saint-Gervais-les-Bains-Le Fayet.
  - L5: half-hourly service to La Plaine.
  - L6: rush-hour service to Bellegarde.

== PRODES EA 2035 ==
As part of the strategic development program for rail infrastructure (PRODES), the Confederation and SBB are focusing on customer orientation and economical management of resources.

By 2040, nearly two million people will travel by rail every day, 50% more than today. In rail freight, the Confederation also expects traffic to increase by around 45%. The Swiss rail network will have to continue to meet customer needs: interesting connections, punctual trains, affordable tickets. SBB is committed to the sustainable development of public transport and takes on this responsibility vis-à-vis Switzerland.

=== Predicted Services ===
The following services will stop from 2035 at Geneva:

- TGV Lyria:
  - Service every two hours to Paris-Lyon.
    - Three trains per day starting at Lausanne.
  - One daily round-trip to Marseille-Saint-Charles in the summer.
- EuroCity: Eight trains per day to Milano Centrale, with two trains continuing from Milano Centrale to Venezia Santa Lucia.
- InterCity:
  - IC1: Hourly service between Geneva Airport and Romanshorn
    - IC11 (Sister Line): Hourly Service between Geneva Airport and Lucerne
  - IC5: Half-hourly service between Geneva Airport and St. Gallen, with every other train continuing to St. Margrethen.
    - IC51 (Sister Line): Hourly service between Geneva Airport and Basel SBB
  - IC9: Half-hourly service between Geneva Airport and Brig
- InterRegio:
  - IR18: Hourly service between Annemasse and Bern
  - IR95: Half-Hourly between Geneva Airport and St-Maurice
  - IR98: Hourly service between Annemasse and Aigle
- TER: Service to Valence-Ville, Lyon-Part-Dieu, Bellegarde, and Chambéry-Challes-les-Eaux.
- Léman Express:
  - L1/L2/L3/L4: service every fifteen minutes between Coppet and Annemasse; from Annemasse every hour to Annecy, and every two hours to Évian-les-Bains and Saint-Gervais-les-Bains-Le Fayet.
  - L5: service to La Plaine.
  - L6: service to Bellegarde.

== In popular culture ==
The station entrance and a platform is seen in The Adventures of Tintin comic The Calculus Affair (1956).

== Gallery ==
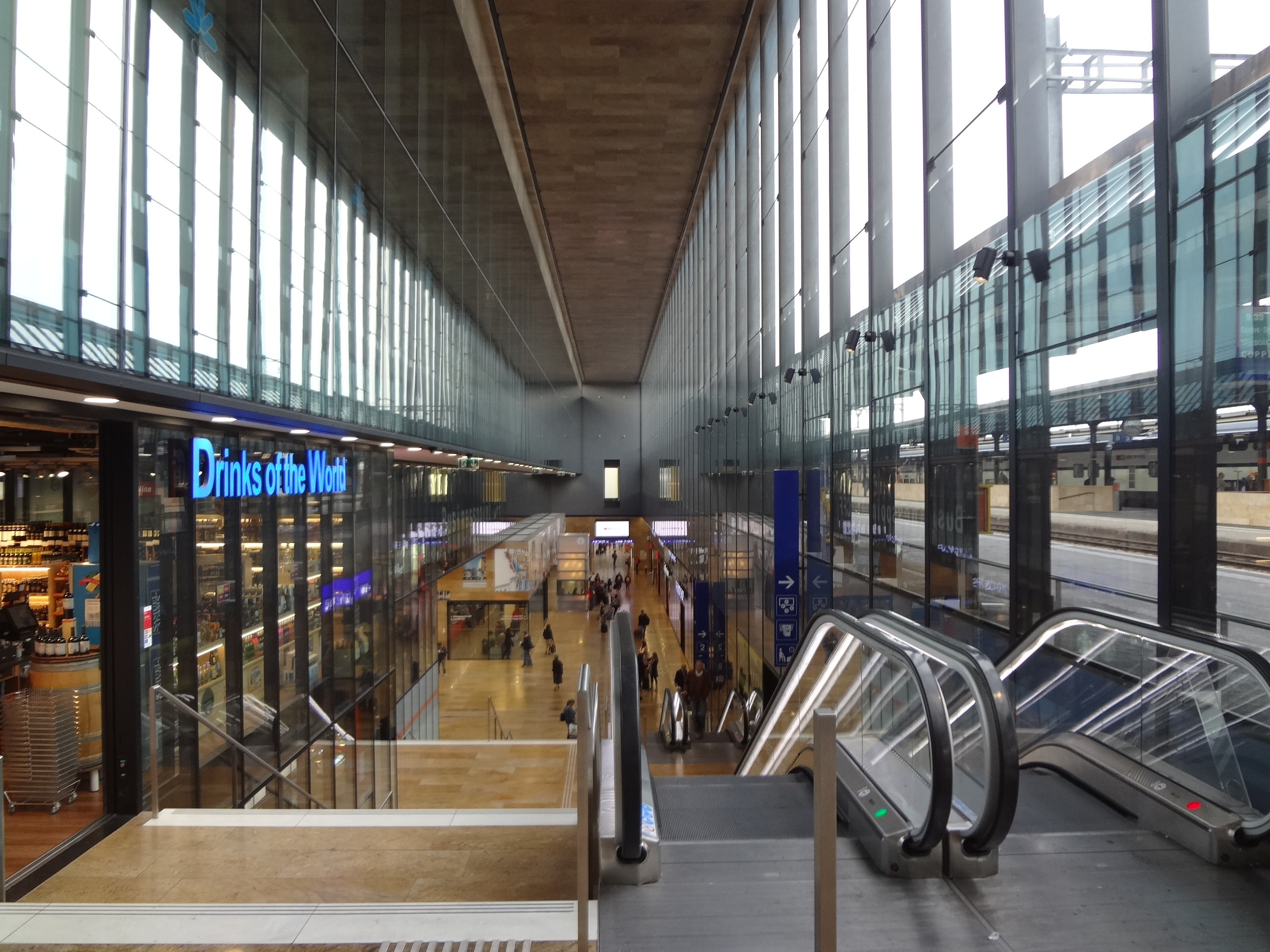
Inside

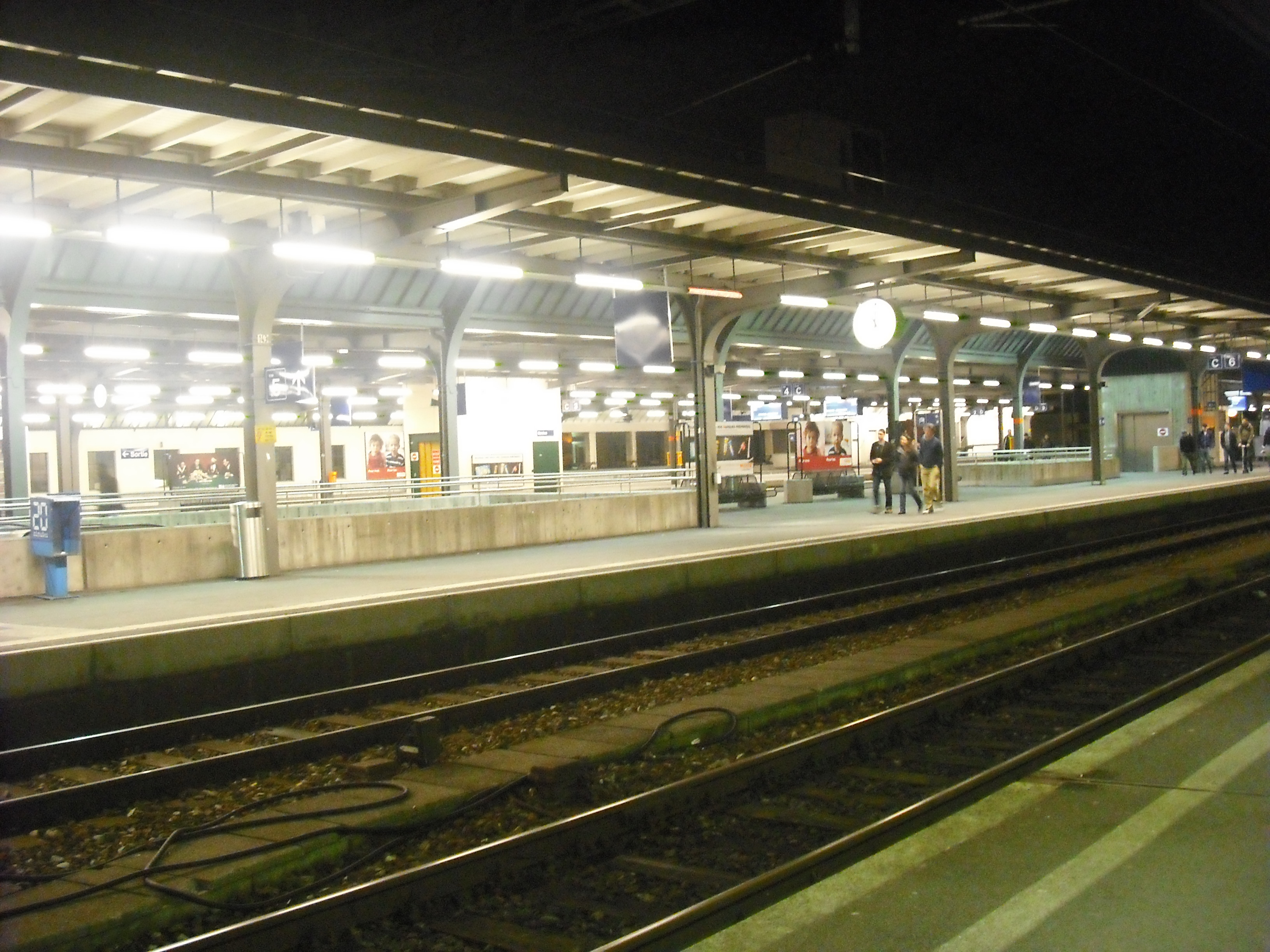
Tracks 6 and 7

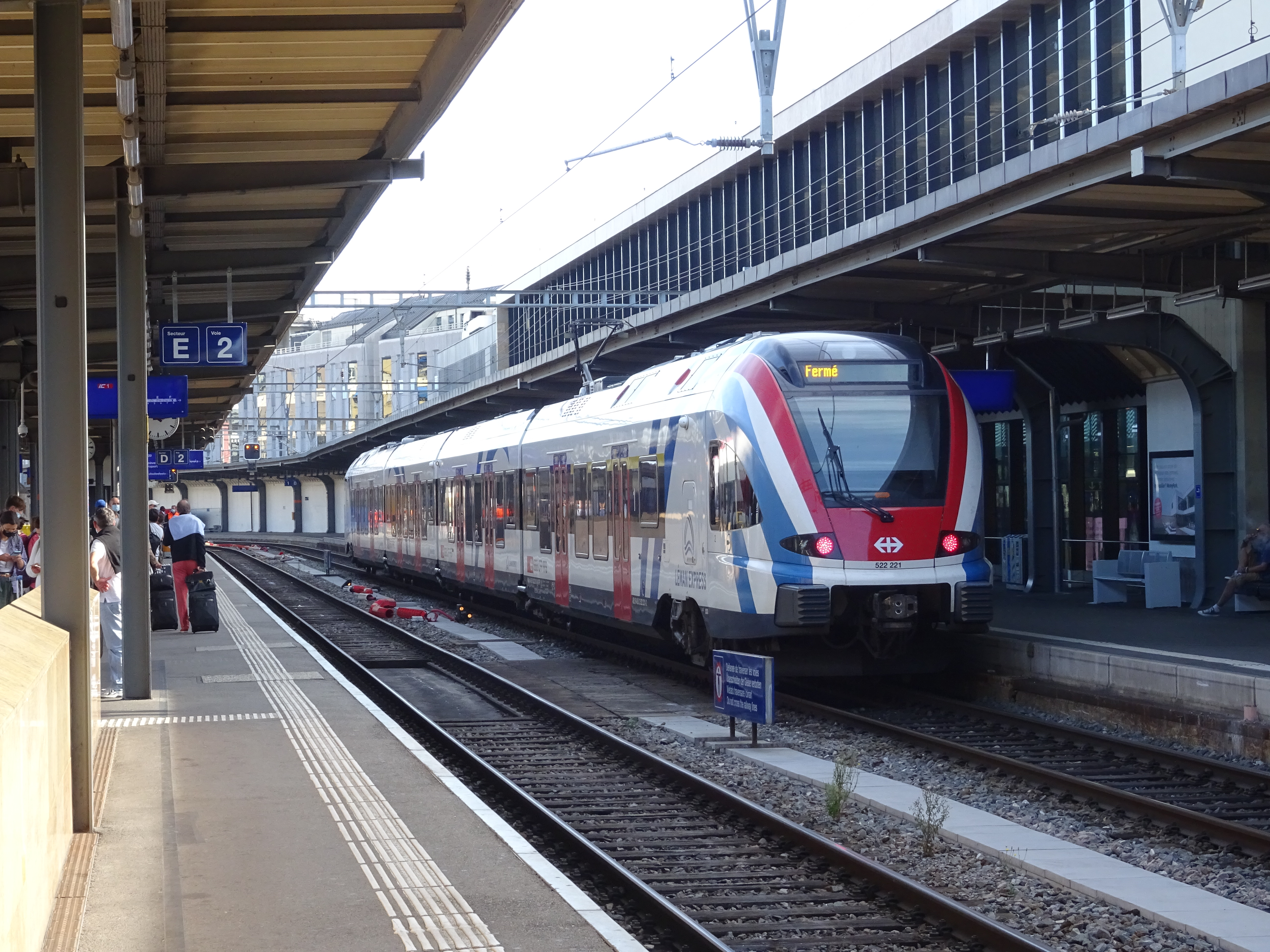
Regional train

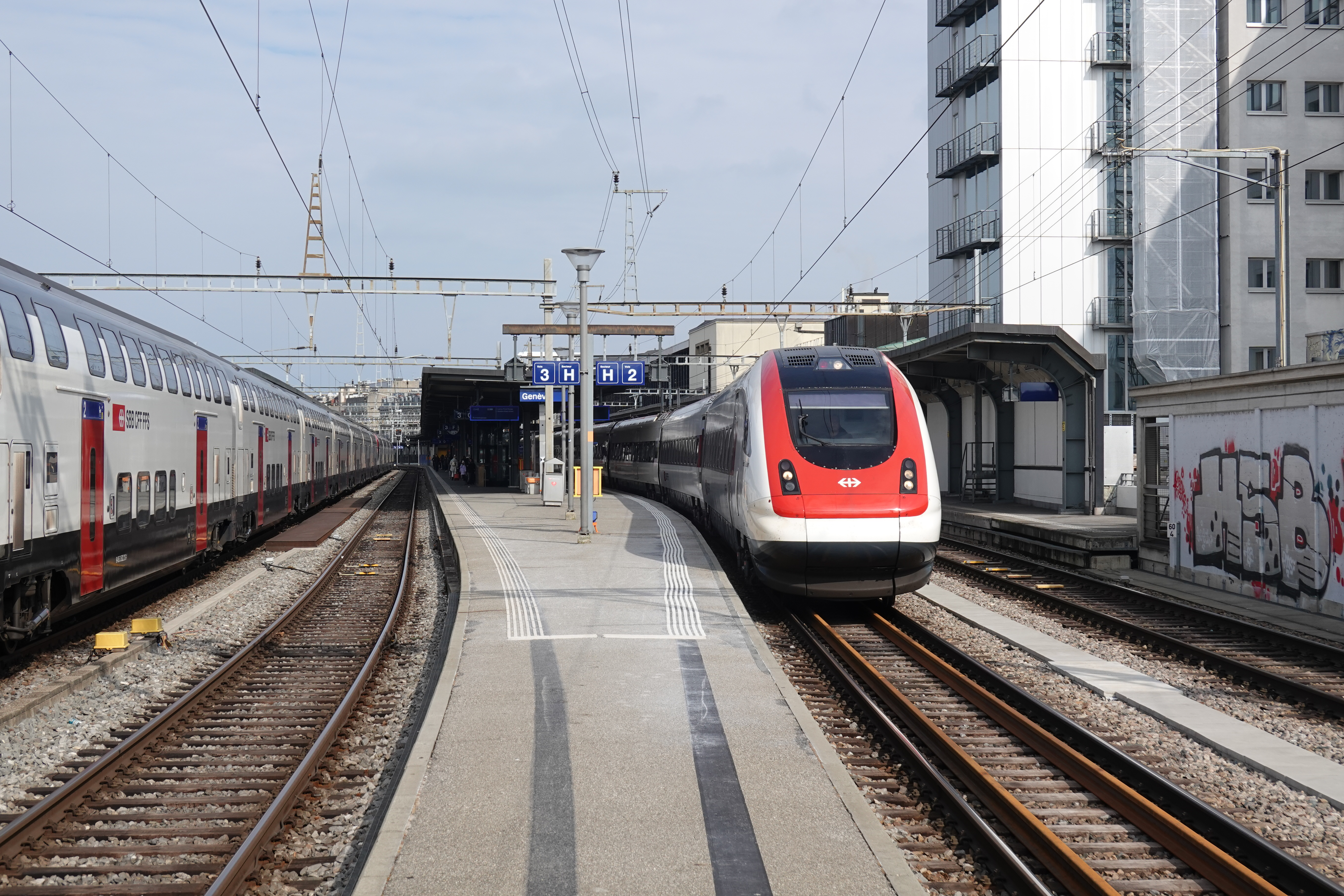
Long-distance trains

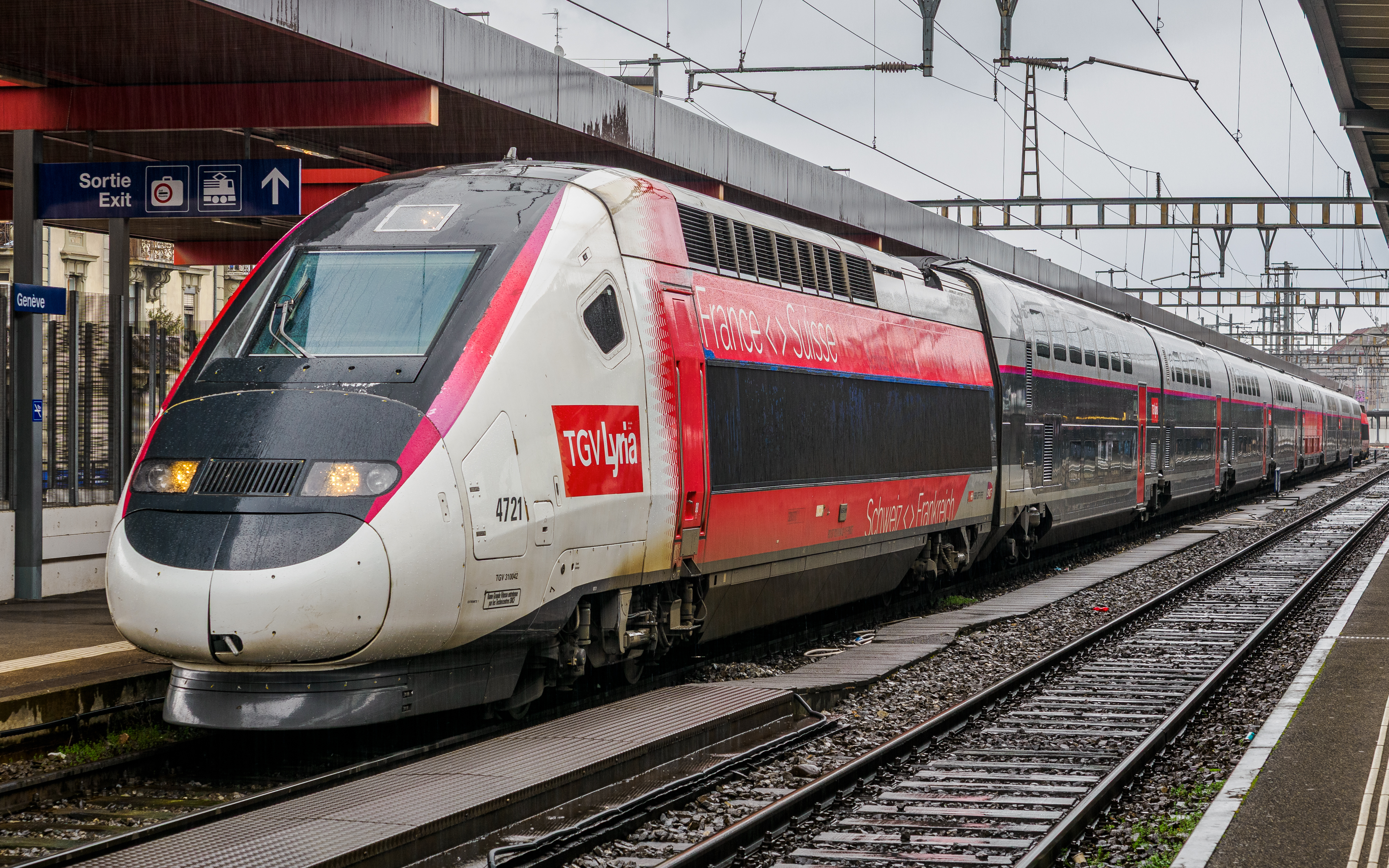
TGV Lyria to Paris

== See also ==
- History of rail transport in Switzerland
- Rail transport in Switzerland
