= Lausanne–Geneva railway =

Railway line in Switzerland

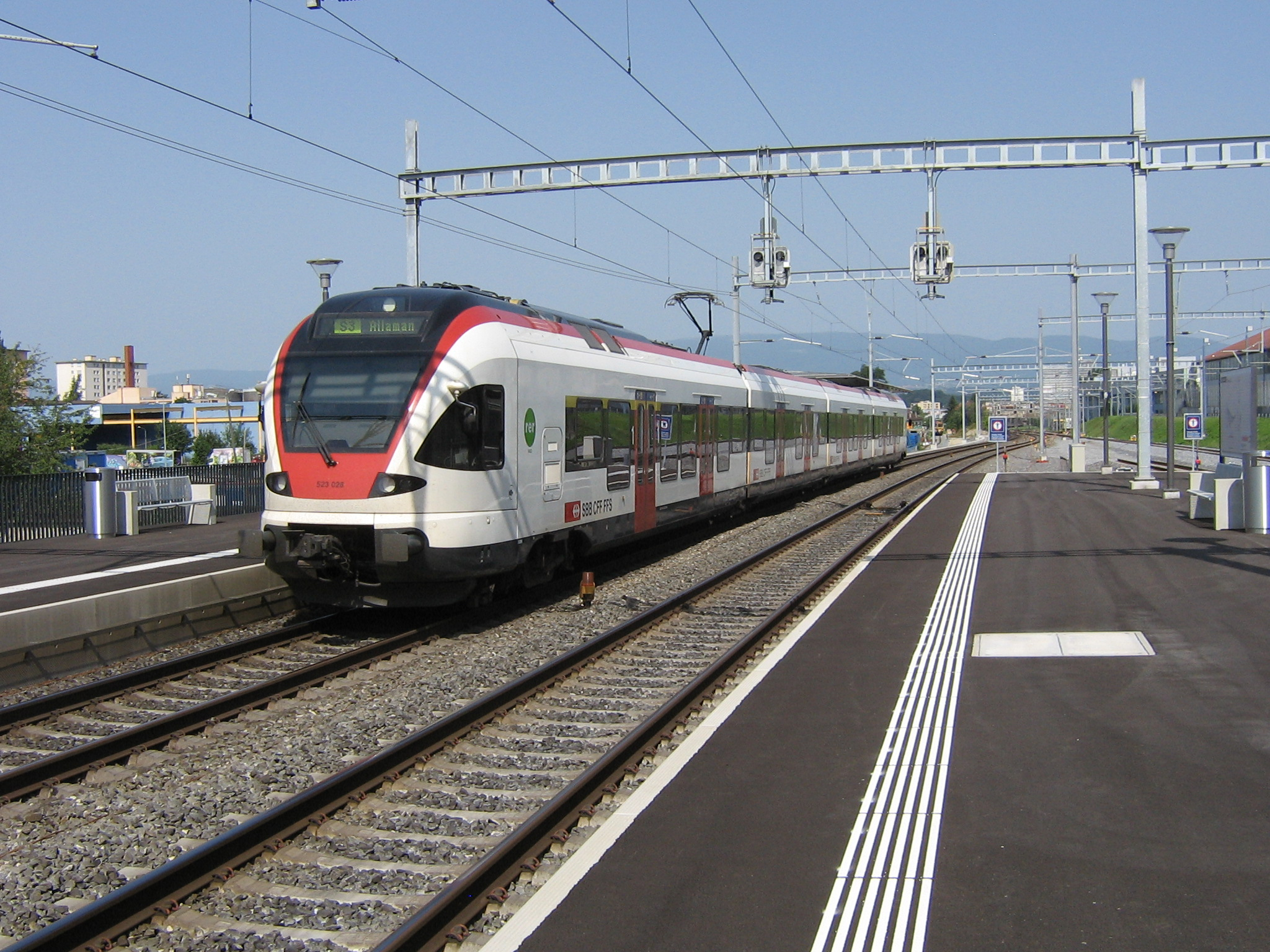
- RABe 523 028 on line S3 leaving Prilly-Malley towards Renens

Overview
- Locale: Switzerland
- Termini: Lausanne; Geneva-Cornavin

Technical
- Number of tracks: 2
- Track gauge: 1,435 mm (4 ft 8 1/2 in)
- Electrification: 15 kV/16.7 Hz AC overhead catenary
- Operating speed: 160 km/h (99 mph)

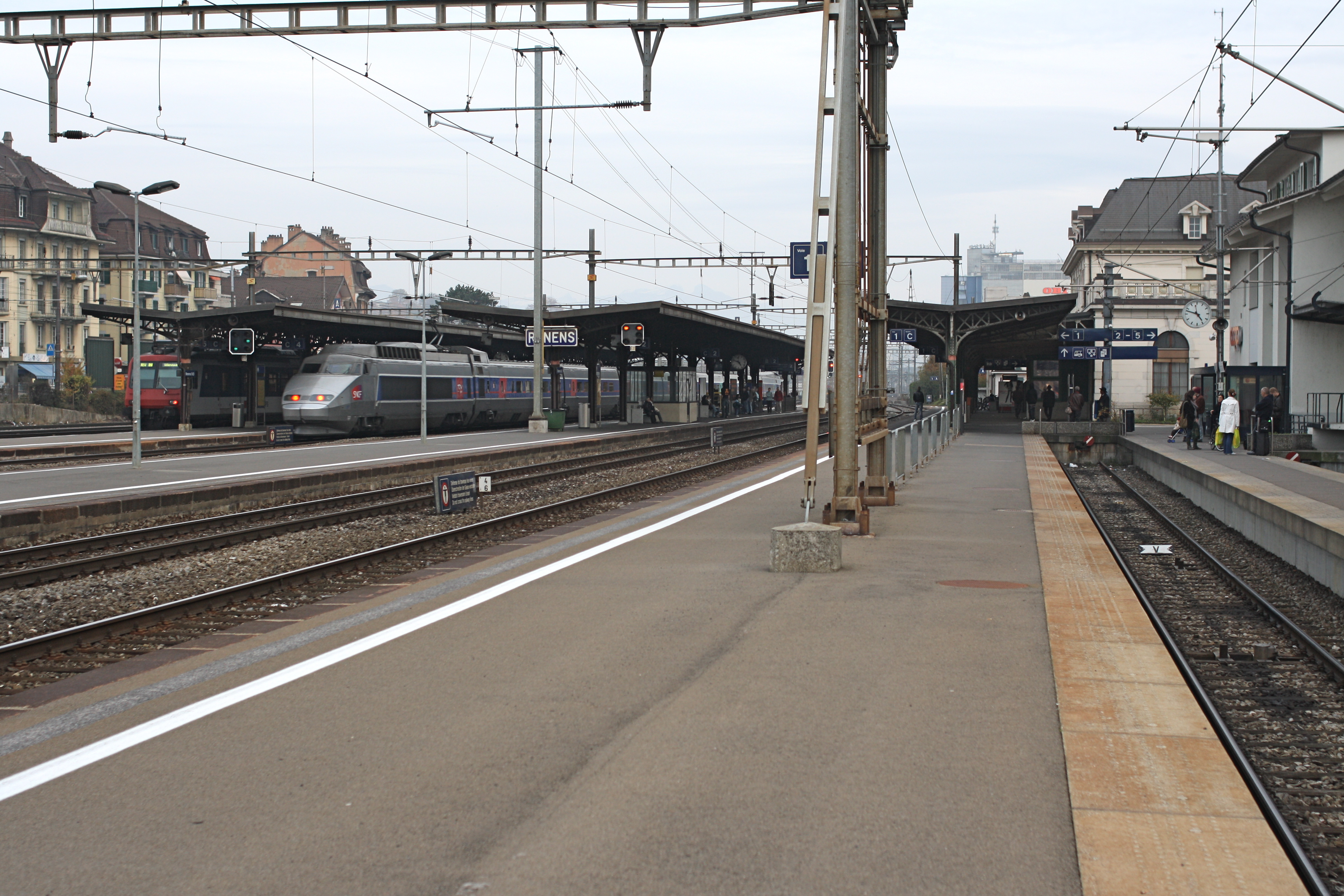
Renens station with a TGV set of the Sud-Est class; on the right is the bay platform of the Lausanne Metro

The Lausanne–Geneva railway is a double-track main railway line in Switzerland. It is an important for passenger transport and is the most frequented railway in Romandy. It serves as an approach from Geneva to the Simplon Railway and the line to Bern and Zürich.

== History ==
=== Opening ===
The origins of the railway stretch back to 1855, when the West Switzerland Company (Compagnie de l’Ouest Suisse, OS) opened the Morges–Renens section as part of the Jura Foot Railway. The extension to Lausanne was completed in 1856.

In March 1858, the Lyon-Geneva Railway (Chemin de fer Lyon-Genève, LG) opened the line between the two cities and this work included the opening of the section between Geneva-Cornavin and the depot of La Châtelaine. A month later, the OS opened its extension to Versoix in two stages. The gap was closed in June of the same year, when the Geneva–Versoix Railway (Chemin de fer Genève–Versoix, GV) joined the two cities.

In 1949, the section between Geneva and the industrial area of La Praille was opened as the starting point for the long sought connection between Geneva's main station of Cornavin and the SNCF’s Geneva-Eaux Vives terminus. Work on the line commenced in 2012 under the project name of CEVA. Until the opening of Lancy-Pont Rouge station in 2002, the line was reserved for freight traffic, but since then it has also handled passenger traffic. The station played an important role during Euro 2008, because the Stade de Genève is in the immediate vicinity.

In 1987, Geneva Airport was connected by a branch line from the La Châtelaine yard on the line to Lyon. Since its opening, the line has been electrified at 15 kV AC and has had double track. It is reserved for long-distance traffic.

Malley-Prilly station was opened in 2011 as part of a project for the establishment of the Réseau Express Vaudois (Vaud express network) between Renens and Lausanne. Nevertheless, operations at Tolochenaz station were abandoned at the same time.

=== Development and electrification ===
A second track had been added to the Morges–Allaman and Gland–Geneva sections by 1868. Duplication of the Allaman–Gland and Renens–Lausanne sections followed in 1872 and the last remaining section between Morges and Renens had also been doubled by 1879.

The line was electrified in 1925 with the SBB single phase 15 kV AC 16.7 Hz system. The branch line to Lancy followed in 1951. The Geneva–La Chatelaine section was electrified with the SNCF 1500 volt DC system, but with the opening of the Geneva Airport railway in 1987 additional tracks electrified at 15 kV AC were added.

As part of the Rail 2000 project, a third track was put into operation between Coppet and Geneva in 2004 after four years of construction and twelve years of planning; this line is used by regional services. The long-distance and freight traffic continues to use the original two tracks. The stations between Coppet and Geneva were rebuilt as single-track halts and the platforms on the old line were dismantled. Regional services between Coppet and Allaman ended and six stations were closed: Founex, Céligny, Crans, Prangins, Gilly-Bursinel, and Perroy.

== Projects ==
As part of the improvement of the line, it is planned to install a fourth track between the stations of Renens and Lausanne. This will allow increasing services on the Vaud regional express network to run every quarter of an hour. It is planned that this track will be commissioned in 2023. The costs are estimated at CHF 210 million with a margin of uncertainty of ± 30%. In parallel with this project, it is planned to build a flyover between Prilly-Malley and Renens. This grade separation would be used by the Cully-Cossonay lines of the Vaud regional express network as well as IC services arriving from Bern and running towards Geneva. Commissioning is planned for 2023 at an estimated cost of CHF 260 million with a margin of uncertainty of ± 30%.

The interlockings in the Lausanne node have to be replaced by 2020. These are the interlockings of Lausanne, Prilly-Malley, Sébeillon and Renens. This will allow the complete channelising of traffic and a minimum interval of two minutes between each train on the same track. This project also involves the modernising of the Lausanne operations centre and the building and rebuilding of associated technical premises. Commissioning is planned between 2016 and 2019 at an estimated cost of CHF 160 million with a margin of uncertainty of ± 30%.

The construction of a third track between Geneva and Coppet allowed the separation of regional traffic from national traffic and thus an increase of regional service frequency to half-hour intervals. The interval of regional services must be reduced to fifteen minutes with the commissioning of CEVA rail. This involves creating two crossing points at Mies and Chambésy as well as a new crossover at Cornavin. The stations between Geneva and Coppet have to be redeveloped with an extension of the platforms to 220 metres and modernised and signalling has to be adapted. The costs are estimated at CHF 210 with a margin of uncertainty of ± 20%.

A central freight crossing loop was planned to be built between Founex and Coppet between 2016 and 2017. The costs were estimated at CHF 100 million with a margin of uncertainty of ± 30%.

It is estimates that demand on the line will increase at Geneva-Cornavin station by 120% in 2030 compared to 2007. This will be particularly driven by the extension of the regional express network and the opening of the CEVA line. To avoid the saturation of the station, it is planned to build two more tracks (on the surface or underground) and to separate the traffic into the following three categories:

- international services arriving from France via La Plaine;
- Swiss main line services;
- regional traffic towards Coppet and Annemasse.

This will allow up to 56 trains per hour to stop at the station. It is hoped to open the new tracks between 2020 and 2025 and costs are estimated to be at least CHF 835 million.

== Operations ==
The line is of great importance in passenger transport, connecting Geneva to the rest of the Swiss Federal Railways network.

=== Long-distance ===
InterCity trains to Bern–Zürich–St. Gallen, as well as InterRegio trains from Geneva Airport to Lucerne and Brig, run the full distance. EuroCity trains operated with ETR 610 sets run to Milan and Venice and RegioExpress trains run between Geneva-Cornavin and Lausanne over the line from Geneva to Lausanne. In addition, the Geneva Airport–Morges section is used by ICN tilting trains running via the Jura Foot Railway to Basel SBB and St. Gallen.

In addition, the Lausanne–Renens section serves the long-distance traffic to Paris and the Jura Foot Railway.

=== Regional services ===
The Vaud express network has been established in the Greater Lausanne region and runs between Renens and Lausanne.

In the Greater Geneva area, regional trains on the Coppet–Lancy–Pont Rouge route run on a separate track between Coppet and Geneva.

Regional services have been abandoned between Allaman and Coppet and all stations except Rolle, Gland and Nyon have been closed. The remaining stations are served by InterRegio and RegioExpress services.
