= Léman Express =

Rail network in Switzerland and France

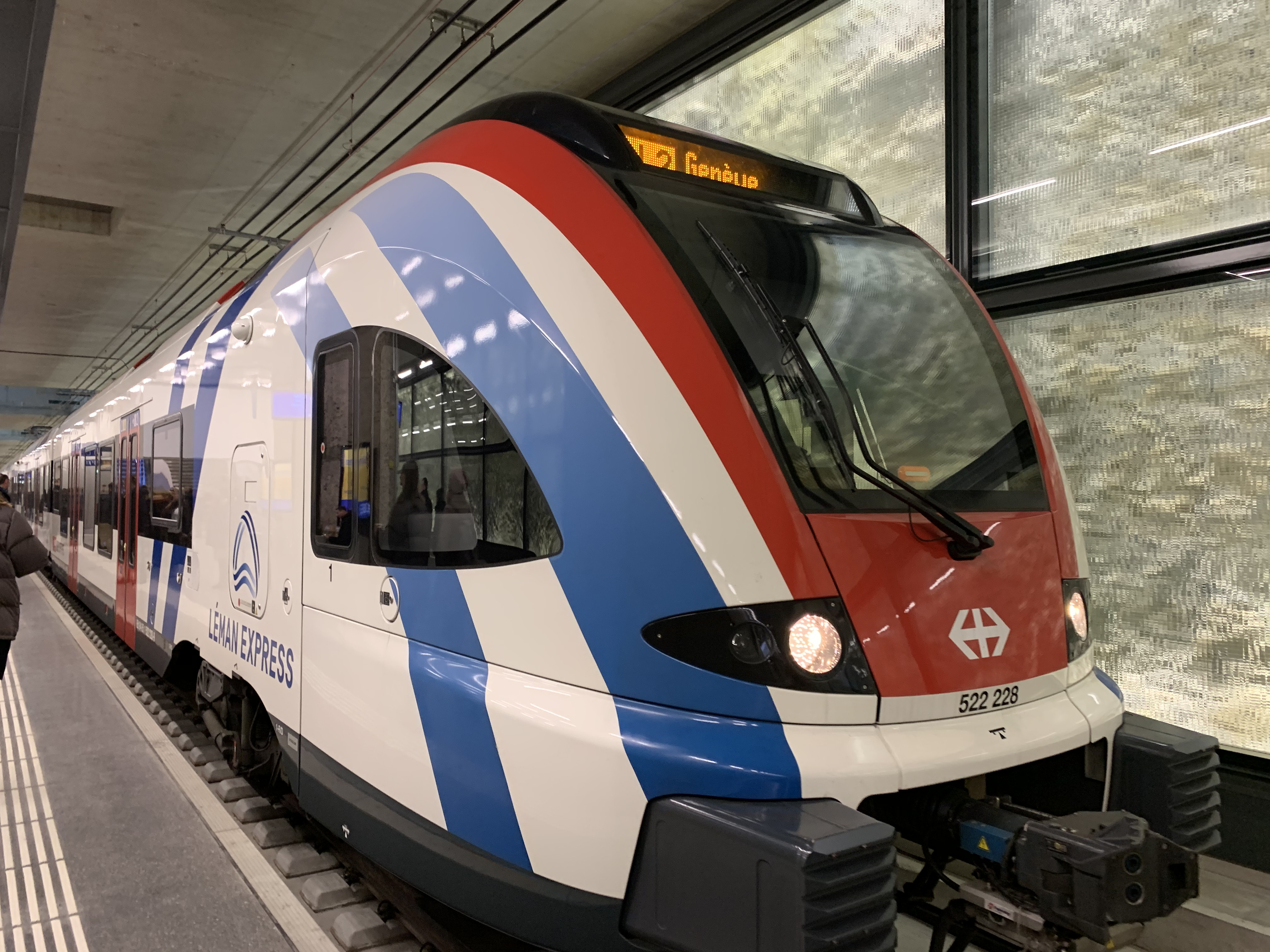
- An RABe 522 train in Léman Express livery at Genève-Eaux-Vives railway station on opening day, 15 December 2019

Overview
- Owner: CFF Infrastructure; SNCF Réseau
- Locale: Switzerland: cantons of Geneva and Vaud; France: departments of Haute-Savoie and Ain
- Transit type: Commuter rail
- Number of lines: 7
- Number of stations: 45
- Daily ridership: 92,000 in 2025
- Website: lemanexpress.ch

Operation
- Began operation: 15 December 2019; 6 years ago
- Operators: CFF; SNCF

Technical
- System length: 230 km (140 mi)
- Track gauge: 1,435 mm (4 ft 8 1/2 in) standard gauge

Network map

The Léman Express is an S-Bahn-style commuter rail network for the transborder agglomeration of Grand Genève (Greater Geneva) in west Switzerland and the French Alps (Haute-Savoie and Ain). Seven lines serve Swiss and French towns along 230 kilometres (140 mi) of railway.

At the heart of the Léman Express system is the CEVA (Cornavin‒Eaux-Vives‒Annemasse) rail project linking Eaux-Vives station with Cornavin station in Geneva. This line, largely underground, was opened on 15 December 2019. The Léman Express marked the start of direct services from Genève-Cornavin station to the French cities of Évian, Thonon, Annemasse and Annecy as well as the population of the Arve Valley up to Saint-Gervais-les-Bains.

== Lines ==
As of the December 2025 timetable change, the Léman Express operates daily from 5:00 a.m. to 12:30 a.m., hourly overnight on RL4 and RL5 with one nocturnal return trip on L7.

	Route	Travel time
L1	Coppet ⥋ Genève-Cornavin ⥋ Annemasse ⥋ Thonon-les-Bains ⥋ Évian-les-Bains	83 min
L2	Coppet ⥋ Genève-Cornavin ⥋ Annemasse ⥋ La Roche-sur-Foron ⥋ Annecy	100 min
L3	Coppet ⥋ Genève-Cornavin ⥋ Annemasse ⥋ La Roche-sur-Foron ⥋ Cluses ⥋ Saint-Gervais-les-Bains-Le Fayet	112 min
L4	Coppet ⥋ Annemasse	46 min
L5	Genève-Cornavin ⥋ La Plaine	17 min
L6	Genève-Cornavin ⥋ Bellegarde	35 min
L7	(Genève-Aéroport / Vernier ⥋) Lancy-Pont-Rouge ⥋ Annemasse	19 min

== Ridership ==
Upon the full launch of the network in December 2019, it was hoped ridership would be around 50,000 travellers per day by the end of the next year; at the beginning of March 2020 it had already reached 45,000 per day before the COVID-19 pandemic and related economic and travel shutdowns reduced ridership. As of June 2020, ridership had recovered to around 50% of pre-pandemic ridership, and by 2022 the ridership reached 70,000 passengers per day, 40% higher than the initial target set for the network.

== Fares ==
As the Léman Express is an international system between two countries, the fare system is complex. Until its entry into service, the cross-border agglomeration had a zone-based fare system named Unireso. Zone 10, Tout Genève, covered all of the canton of Geneva. Fares inside this zone still use the Unireso Zone 10 ticket price. Trips to/from Vaud are charged the CFF fare, and trips entirely in France are charged the TER fare. Cross-border fares are charged at the Léman Pass rate, which is calculated as a specific fare based on the distance between stations. All stations within the Unireso zone are charged at the same rate, so a 44 minute trip from Annemasse to Pont-Céard, the last station in Zone 10, is charged the same fare as a 7 minute trip from Annemasse to Chêne-Bourg—as is a trip from Annemasse to the Geneva Airport, not even on the Léman Express network. Trips from outside Zone 10 to the other side of Zone 10, such as Annemasse to Coppet, are charged the full distance-based fare.

== History ==
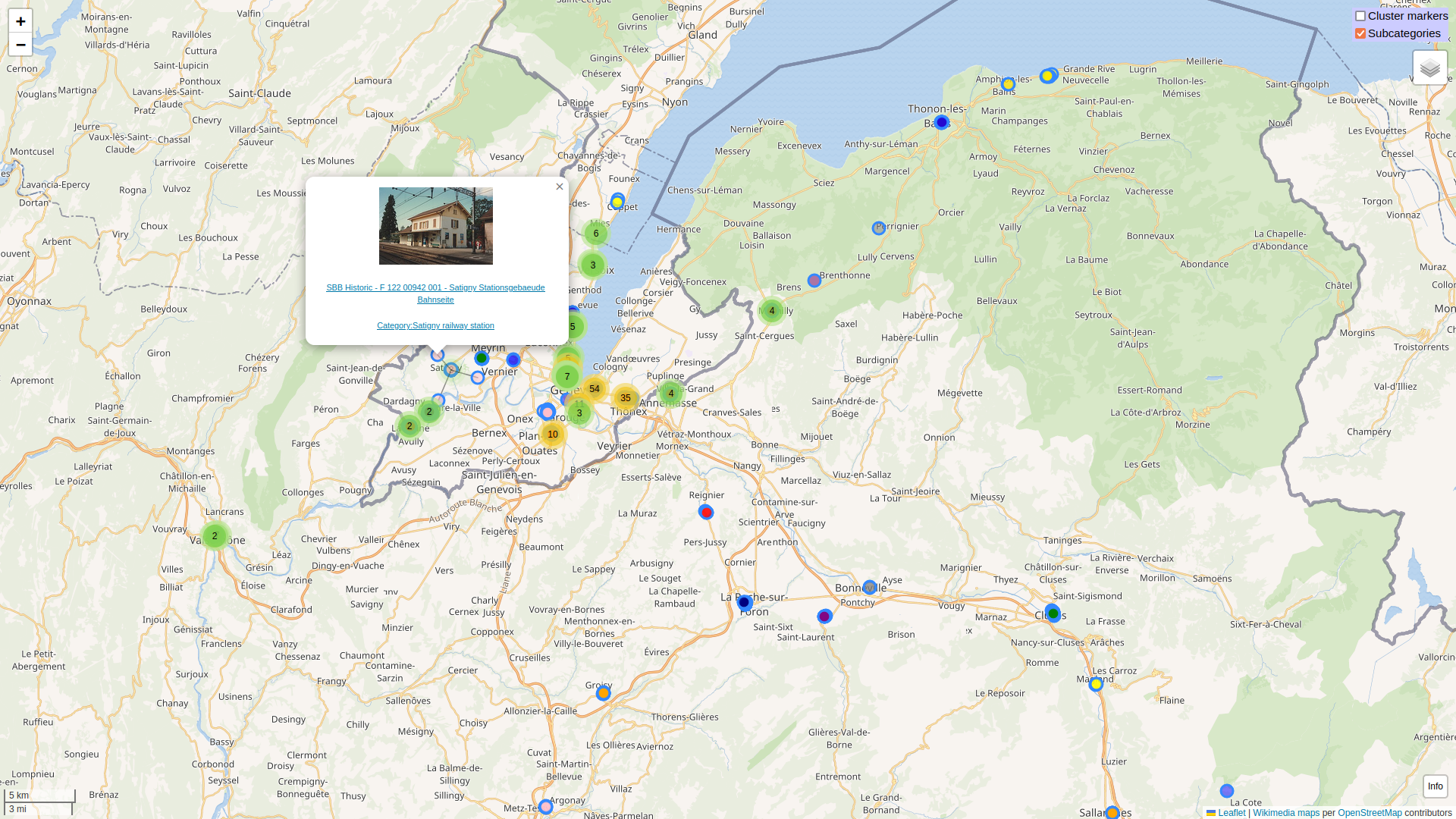
Stations of Léman Express (by locations of geocoded photos on Wikimedia Commons)

Prior to the opening CEVA, local rail in Geneva consisted of two short services: the half-hourly Regio operating from Coppet to the main Genève-Cornavin railway station and (since 2002) on to Lancy-Pont-Rouge station (now sections of L1-L4), as well as the Rhône Express Régional (abbreviated to 'RER') line from La Plaine (in Dardagny) to Genève-Cornavin station (now L5 and L6). Special tram-trains derived from those on Lausanne métro's line M1 were built for the service. Local trains to Bellegarde-sur-Valserine (in France) joined the network on 3 December 2001. The line was subsequently upgraded to the standard 25 kV AC electrification (as used on much of the French railways) in conjunction with the development of the Léman Express system.

On 8 February 2008, the Swiss and French Railways brought into being a study and marketing company, Transferis, to look into rolling stock, service, and marketing improvements for the RER system. The studies were necessitated by the growing number of commuters living in France and working in Geneva, not only on the short, existing RER system but on the lines leaving the station at Eaux Vives on the south side of the lake.

The new, enlarged, RER network was to cover the present Eaux Vives to Annemasse line with services at regular intervals beyond to serve Évian, St. Gervais and Annecy, the RER line from Cornavin to La Plaine with services extending beyond to serve Bellegarde, and the local CFF services operating from Lancy (Pont Rouge) to Coppet through Cornavin. At the time of study, services carried some 7'000 commuters a day; with the improved network this was expected to grow to over 35'000 and cut up to 50'000 car journeys between France and Switzerland.

The largest civil engineering project within the scheme was the CEVA line from Cornavin to Annemasse. Connecting the two stations had been proposed as early as the 1850s, with a preliminary section from Annemasse to Eaux Vives completed in 1888. However, no further work was completed until the 21st century. As part of the final project, the a tunnel was built connecting the marshalling yard at La Praille (Lancy-Pont Rouge) to Eaux Vives, and Eaux Vives and Annemasse the 19th century line was closed for four years period whilst it was double-tracked and cut-and-covered.

As part of the scheme and to avoid RER rolling stock needing three voltages, Cornavin – La Plaine – Bellegarde was re-electrified at 25 kV AC in summer 2014. This not only allows standard Swiss dual voltage (25 kV AC 50 Hz and 15 kV 16 2/3 Hz) EMUs to work on the line but also improves the performance of the TGV workings (Paris-Geneva TGVs no longer need to run under 1.5 kV DC).

The French signalling and train control between Geneva and la Plaine was replaced with standard Swiss equipment, the points motors renewed and the line fully automated.

The third track from Geneva to Coppet had passing loops installed at Chambésy and Mies stations where northbound and southbound trains can pass to allow for four trains per hour operation. As the passing loops were finished before the CEVA tunnel, quarter hourly service to Coppet was started on 9 December 2018, over a year in advance of the full rollout of the Léman Express.

The completion of the project in December 2019 makes it the largest cross-border local transport network in Europe, at 230 route-km.

On December 9 2025, the CFF announced that having made safety upgrades to the third leg of the Chatelaine triangular tunnels to allow passenger services, one direct train per day would link Annemasse to the airport.

=== Prior services ===
==== Local service along the Lausanne–Geneva railway ====
Local Régio trains served the Geneva to Coppet section of the modern Léman Express since the opening of the railway in the 19th century, with local service continuing to Nyon and Lausanne. In 2004, as part of the Rail 2000 railway upgrade program, a third track was inaugurated between Geneva and Coppet, allowing service to be upgraded to a half-hourly frequency, but with local service being cut north of Coppet. Local stations between Coppet and Allaman, the southern extent of the RER Vaud, were closed: Founex, Céligny, Crans, Prangins, Gilly-Bursinel and Perroy.

==== Rhône Express Régional ====
This line used to be electrified at 1500 V DC and signalled to SNCF standards from the border to both Geneva's central passenger station and La Praille goods depot.

Prior to the introduction of the "RER" brand in 1995 the Geneva – La-Plaine service was operated by two notoriously unreliable BDe 4/4 II railcars rebuilt to 1500V DC.

The Geneva RER or Rhône Express Régional was a commuter railway service running between Geneva Cornavin station, Switzerland using the dedicated Platform 5 and La Plaine (Swiss terminus) and Bellegarde-sur-Valserine in France. It used part of the Lyon–Geneva railway. It is probably not a coincidence that the initials correspond to the Paris suburban railway commuter network RER. The service was twice hourly in each direction weekdays, with additional hourly services to Bellegarde at peak hours. Fares within the Swiss sector are covered by the Tout Genève (lit. 'whole of Geneva') rate, zones 11–17.

Initially, service was operated by five specially built two coach articulated railcars of class Bem550. These were built by Vevey Technologies (formerly Ateliers de Constructions Mécaniques de Vevey, ACMV) with electrical equipment by Asea Brown Boveri in 1994. They ran under 1.5 kV DC wires, but were equipped with a diesel engine to enable them to reach the workshops.

When the service frequency was expanded, some trains composed of RIO carriages hauled by BB25500 series locos. This rather antiquated rolling stock was replaced progressively by Stadler FLIRT RABe 524 EMUs.

From December 2010 to June 2014, Geneva – La Plaine services were operated by three Stadler FLIRT RABe 524 EMUs, which were not certified to run beyond la Plaine, while Geneva-Bellegarde services were operated by the Bem550s. The RABe 524 were taken temporarily from the Ticino railway network as they can also run on 1500V DC. These sets went back to Ticino when the Genève-La Plaine line was re-electrified with 25 kV AC as they cannot use that voltage, to be replaced by RABe 522 EMUs.

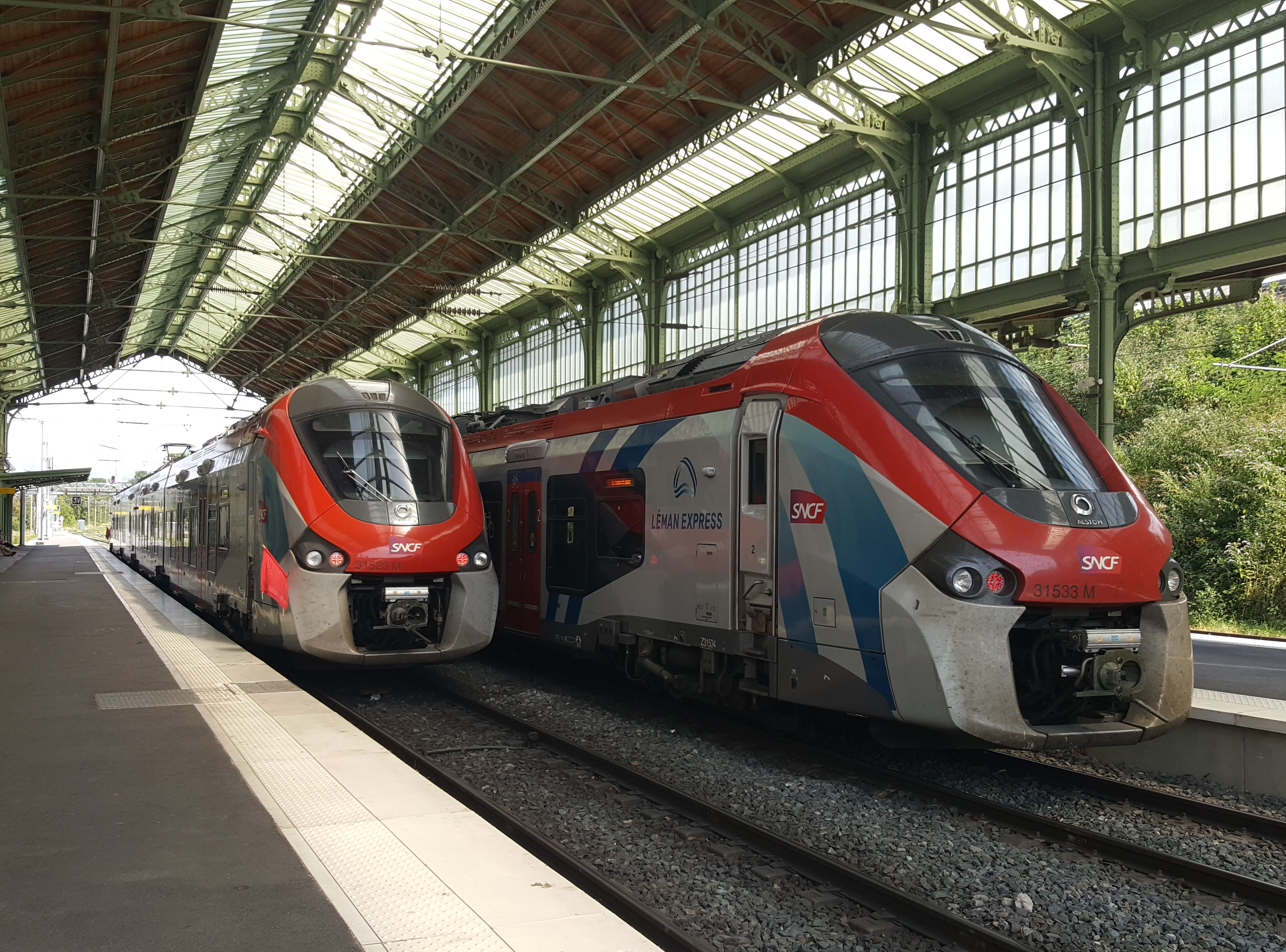
Régiolis Léman Express trains at the Évian-les-Bains station.

== Future ==
On 20 February 2020, about three months after the full opening of the network, a steering committee composed of Swiss and French representatives met to revive the Tonkin Railway, a 17.8 kilometres (11.1 mi) long section between Saint-Gingolph and Évian-les-Bains. Due to the geography of Lake Geneva, this would provide Geneva a shorter connection to Monthey, Martigny, Sion, Sierre, and Brig. It plans to carry out studies until 2022, start work around 2024, and open the railway in 2027.
