= Évian-les-Bains station =

Railway station in Évian-les-Bains, France

Évian-les-Bains
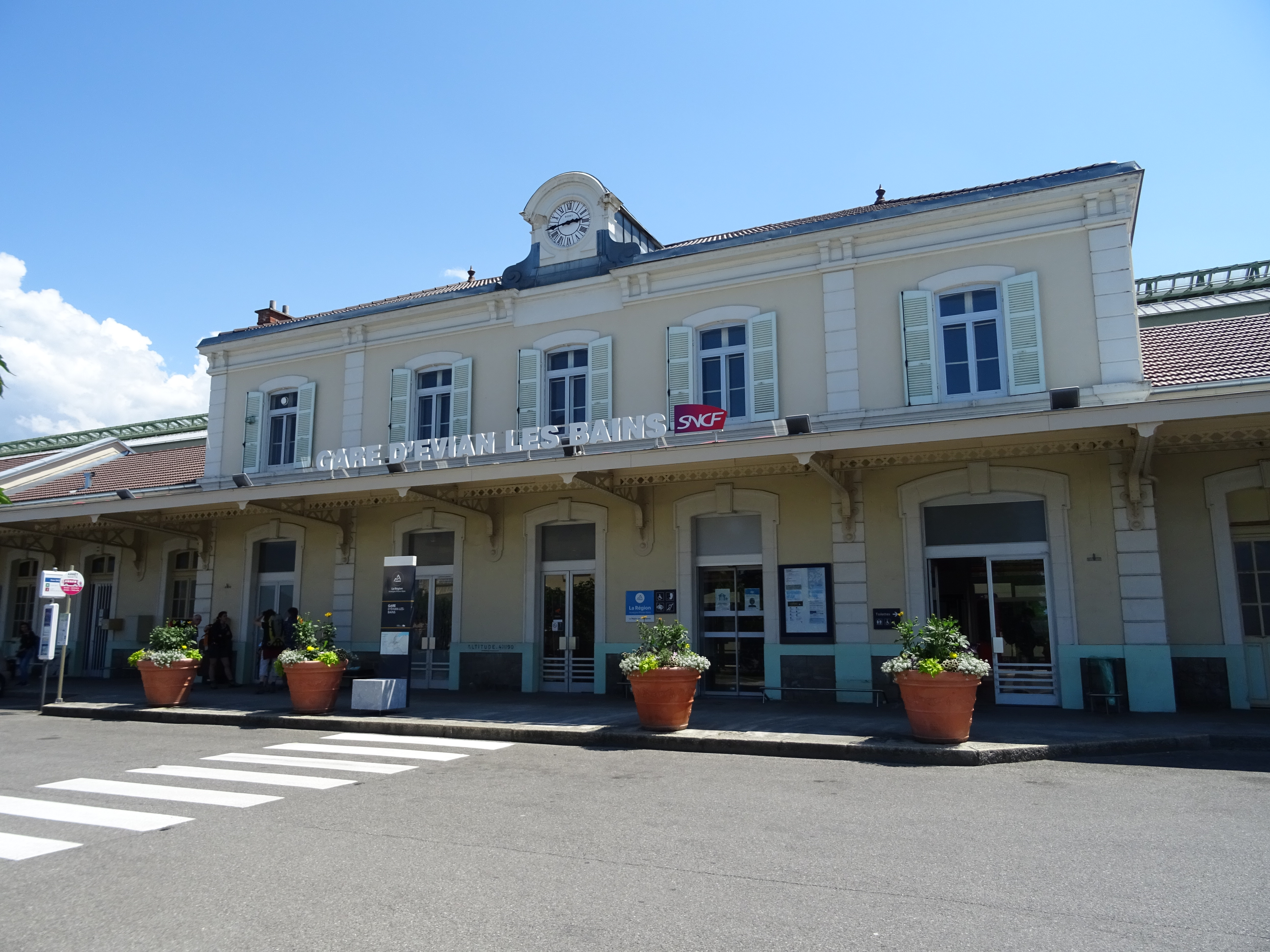
- The station building in 2020

General information
- Location: 29 Avenue de la Gare; 74500 Évian-les-Bains; Haute-Savoie; France
- Coordinates: 46°23′52″N 6°34′39″E
- Owner: SNCF
- Line: Longeray-Léaz–Le Bouveret railway
- Train operators: SNCF; Léman Express

Services
Preceding station	SNCF	Following station
Thonon-les-Bains towards Paris-Lyon	TGV inOui Weekends and holidays	Terminus
Preceding station	Léman Express	Following station
Thonon-les-Bains towards Coppet	L1	Terminus
Preceding station	TER Auvergne-Rhône-Alpes	Following station
Thonon-les-Bains towards Lyon-Part-Dieu	3	Terminus
Location
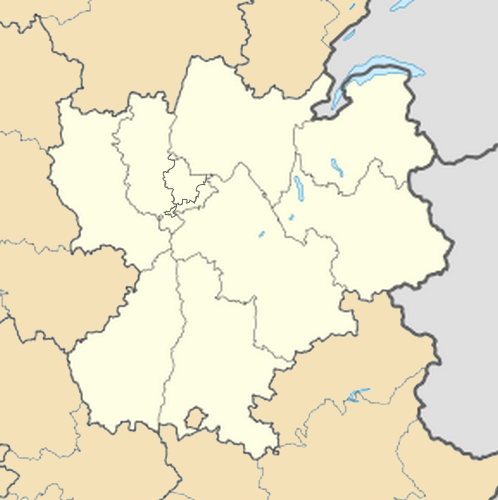
- Location within Auvergne-Rhône-Alpes Location within Rhône-Alpes Location within France

Évian-les-Bains ([evjɑ̃ le bɛ̃]; French: Gare d'Évian-les-Bains) is a railway station serving the spa town of Évian-les-Bains, Haute-Savoie department, southeastern France. The station is served by regional trains (TER) towards Lyon, Annemasse and Switzerland (Léman Express towards Geneva), and high-speed trains (TGV) to Paris (weekends and holidays).
