= Coppet railway station =

Railway station in Coppet, Switzerland

Coppet
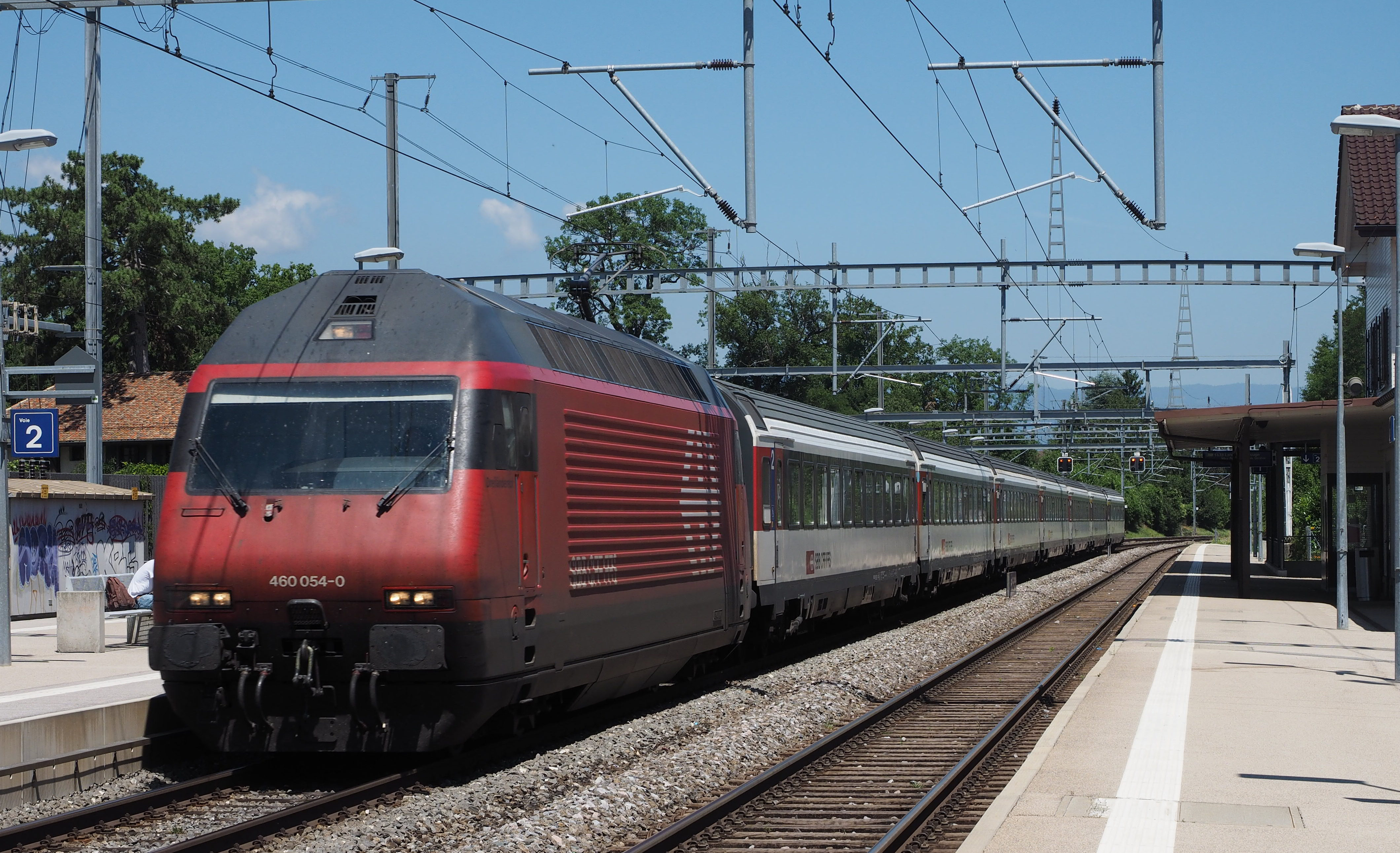
- An SBB train arrives at the station in 2014

General information
- Location: Coppet; Switzerland
- Coordinates: 46°19′03″N 6°11′16″E
- Elevation: 393 m (1,289 ft)
- Owner: Swiss Federal Railways
- Line: Lausanne–Geneva line
- Distance: 47.0 km (29.2 mi) from Lausanne
- Platforms: 3: 1 island platform; 1 side platform
- Tracks: 3
- Train operators: Swiss Federal Railways
- Connections: TPN

Construction
- Parking: Yes (140 spaces)
- Cycle facilities: Yes (99 spaces)
- Accessible: Yes

Other information
- Station code: 8501023 (COP)
- Fare zone: 22 (mobilis)

Passengers
- 2023: 9'100 per weekday (SBB)

Services
Preceding station	SBB CFF FFS	Following station
Genève-Cornavin towards Annemasse or Geneva Airport	RE33	Nyon towards St-Maurice or Martigny
Preceding station	Léman Express	Following station
Tannay towards Évian-les-Bains	L1	Terminus
Tannay towards Annecy	L2	Terminus
Tannay towards Saint-Gervais	L3	Terminus
Tannay towards Annemasse	L4	Terminus
Location
- Location within Switzerland Location within Canton of Vaud

Coppet railway station (French: Gare de Coppet) is a railway station in the municipality of Coppet, in the Swiss canton of Vaud. It is an intermediate stop on the standard gauge Lausanne–Geneva line of Swiss Federal Railways.

== Layout and connections ==
Coppet has an island platform and a side platform which together serve three tracks. Transports publics de la région nyonnaise (TPN) operate bus services from the station.

== Services ==
As of the December 2024 timetable change, the following services stop at Coppet:

- RegioExpress: half-hourly service (hourly on weekends) between Annemasse and St-Maurice, and hourly service from St-Maurice to Martigny. On weekends, hourly service to Geneva Airport.
- Léman Express L1 / L2 / L3 / L4: service every fifteen minutes to Annemasse via Genève-Cornavin, from Annemasse every hour to Annecy, half-hourly or hourly service or service every two hours to Évian-les-Bains and every two hours to Saint-Gervais-les-Bains-Le Fayet.
