= Saint-Gervais-les-Bains–Le Fayet station =

Railway station serving the town Saint-Gervais-les-Bains, Haute-Savoie

Saint-Gervais-les-Bains Le Fayet
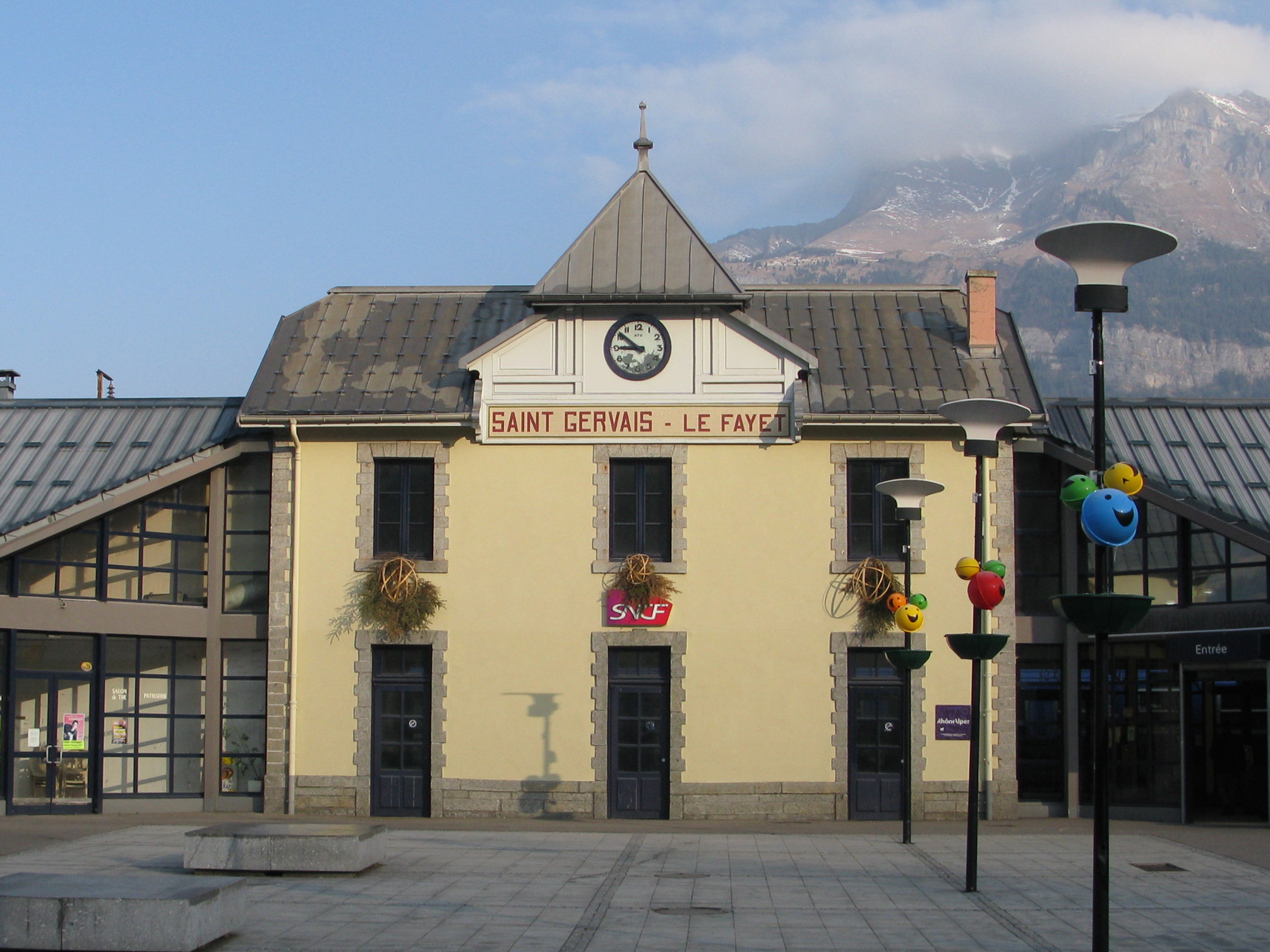
- Entrance of the station

General information
- Location: Saint-Gervais-les-Bains; France
- Coordinates: 45°54′23″N 6°42′05″E
- Elevation: 580 m (1,900 ft)
- Owner: SNCF
- Lines: La Roche-sur-Foron–Saint-Gervais-les-Bains-Le Fayet line; Saint-Gervais–Vallorcine line
- Distance: 46.9 km (29.1 mi) from La Roche-sur-Foron
- Train operators: Compagnie du Mont-Blanc; SNCF; TER Auvergne-Rhône-Alpes
- Connections: Cars Région Haute-Savoie bus lines

Passengers
- 2019: 356,019 (SNCF)

Services
Preceding station	SNCF	Following station
Sallanches-Combloux-Megève towards Paris-Lyon	TGV inOui Seasonal service	Terminus
Preceding station	TER Auvergne-Rhône-Alpes	Following station
Sallanches-Combloux-Megève towards Lyon-Part-Dieu	3	Terminus
Sallanches-Combloux-Megève towards Annecy	43	Terminus
Terminus	44	Chedde towards Vallorcine
Preceding station	Léman Express	Following station
Sallanches-Combloux-Megève towards Coppet	L3	Terminus
Location
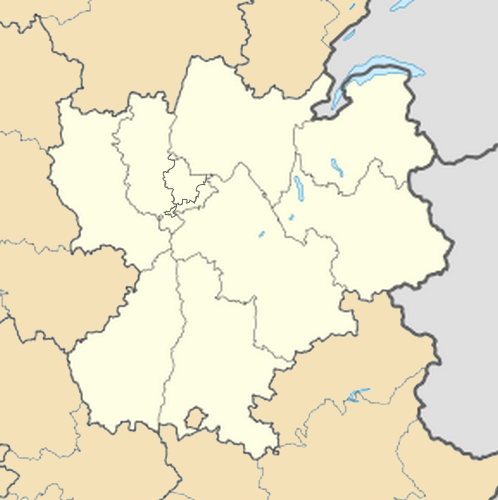
- Location within Auvergne-Rhône-Alpes Location within Rhône-Alpes Location within France

Saint-Gervais-les-Bains–Le Fayet station (French: Gare de Saint-Gervais-les-Bains-Le Fayet) is a railway station serving the town Saint-Gervais-les-Bains, Haute-Savoie department, southeastern France. It is the southeastern terminus of the standard gauge La Roche-sur-Foron–Saint-Gervais-les-Bains-Le Fayet line from La Roche-sur-Foron, the southwestern terminus of the 1,000 mm (3 ft 3 3/8 in) gauge Saint-Gervais–Vallorcine line from the Swiss border, and the western terminus of the Mont Blanc Tramway. It is the southeastern terminus of the L3 line of the Léman Express, a suburban rail network for the Grand Genève, which began operation in 2019.

The station is the base for maintenance equipment including a snow plough for the Mont Blanc Express.

== Services ==
As of the December 2020 timetable change, the following rail services stop at Saint-Gervais-les-Bains-Le Fayet:

- TGV inOui: on weekends during the winter season, two round-trips per day to Paris-Lyon.,
- Léman Express L3 / TER Auvergne-Rhône-Alpes: hourly service to Annemasse and every two hours to Coppet.
- TER Auvergne-Rhône-Alpes:
  - hourly service to Vallorcine.
  - rush-hour service to Annecy.

There are bus connections to Chamonix-Mont-Blanc, les Contamines, St Gervais Bourg, and Passy.
