= Unireso =

Overview
- Locale: Geneva, Switzerland

Unireso is the umbrella organization for a common tariff system for a network of various modes of public transportation in and around Geneva, Switzerland.

== Members ==
- Transports publics genevois (TPG)
- Swiss Federal Railways (SBB-CFF-FFS)
- Mouettes genevoises navigation (SMGN)
- Léman Express
