= Annemasse station =

Railway station in Annemasse, France

Annemasse
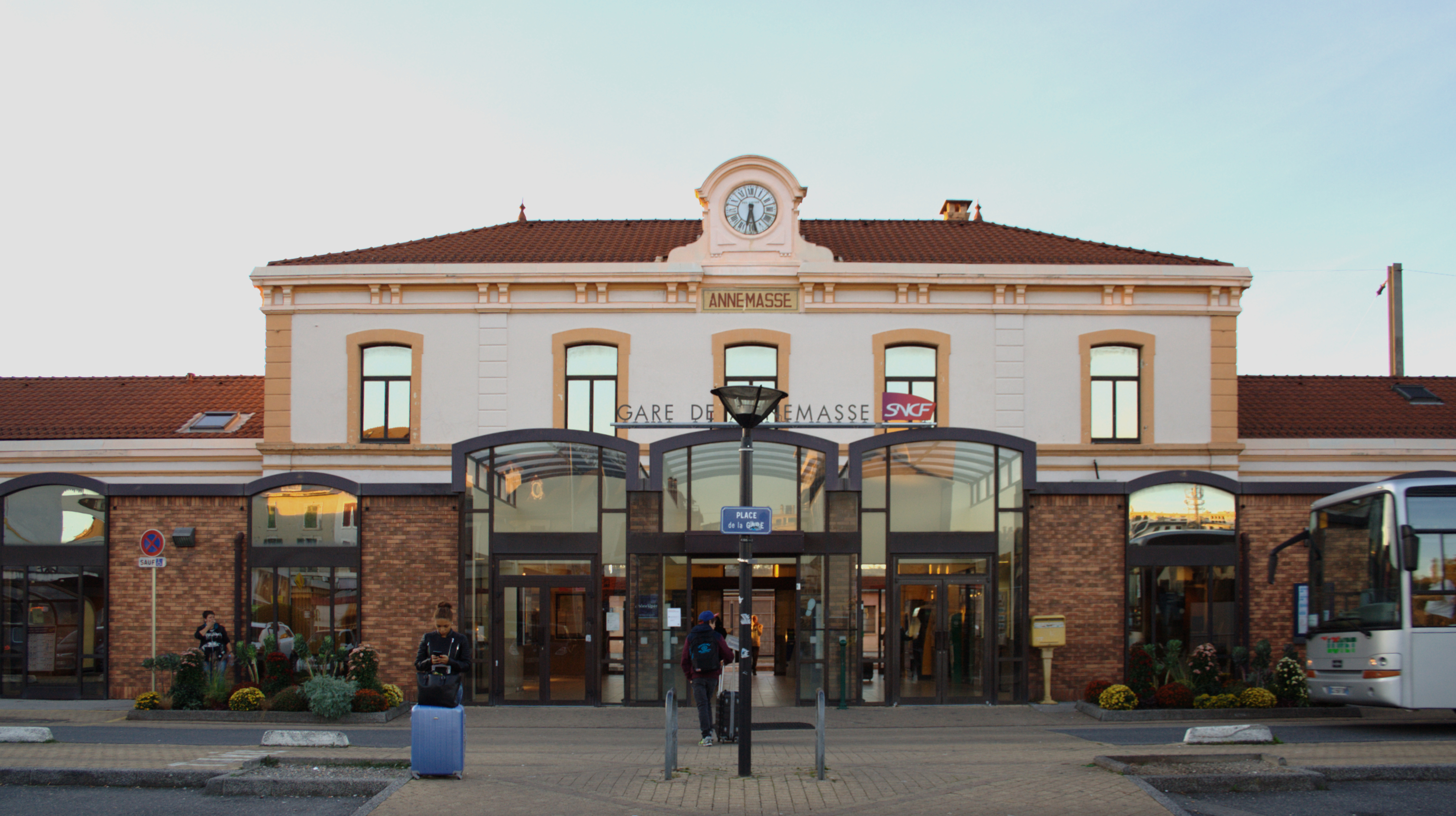
- The south-east façade in 2014

General information
- Location: Annemasse; France
- Coordinates: 46°11′57″N 6°14′11″E
- Elevation: 435 m (1,427 ft)
- Owner: SNCF
- Lines: Aix-les-Bains–Annemasse line; CEVA; Longeray–Léaz-Le Bouveret line (Tonkin Railway)
- Distance: 94.6 km (58.8 mi) from Aix-les-Bains-Le Revard; 73.1 km (45.4 mi) from Lausanne
- Platforms: 6: 1 side platform; 3 island platforms
- Train operators: SNCF; Swiss Federal Railways
- Connections: Cars Région Haute-Savoie, Proxim'iTi, and TAC bus lines

Construction
- Accessible: Yes

Other information
- Station code: 87745497
- Fare zone: 210 (unireso)

History
- Opened: 30 August 1880

Passengers
- 2024: 1,785,835
Services
Preceding station	SNCF	Following station
Bellegarde towards Paris-Lyon	TGV inOui Weekends and holidays	Thonon-les-Bains towards Évian-les-Bains
Cluses towards Saint-Gervais	TGV inOui Seasonal service	Reverses direction
Bellegarde towards Paris-Lyon	TGV inOui Seasonal service	Reverses direction
Preceding station	TER Auvergne-Rhône-Alpes	Following station
Saint-Julien-en-Genevois towards Lyon-Part-Dieu	3	Machilly towards Évian-les-Bains
Saint-Julien-en-Genevois towards Lyon-Part-Dieu	3	Reverses direction
Reignier towards Saint-Gervais	3	Reverses direction
Preceding station	SBB CFF FFS	Following station
Chêne-Bourg towards St-Maurice or Martigny	RE33	Terminus
Preceding station	Léman Express	Following station
Chêne-Bourg towards Coppet	L1	Machilly towards Évian-les-Bains
Chêne-Bourg towards Coppet	L2	Reverses direction
Reignier towards Annecy	L2	Reverses direction
Chêne-Bourg towards Coppet	L3	Reverses direction
Reignier towards Saint-Gervais	L3	Reverses direction
Chêne-Bourg towards Coppet	L4	Terminus
Chêne-Bourg towards Geneva Airport, Vernier or Lancy-Pont-Rouge	L7	Terminus
Location
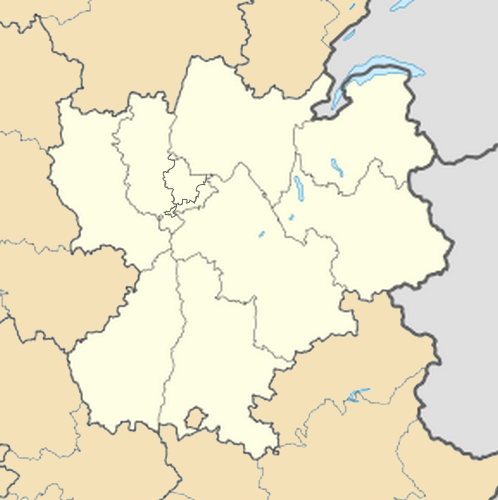
- Location within Auvergne-Rhône-Alpes Location within Rhône-Alpes Location within France

Annemasse station (French: Gare d'Annemasse) is a railway station located in Annemasse, Haute-Savoie, south-eastern France.

== History ==
The station was opened in 1880 and is located on the Aix-les-Bains–Annemasse railway, Longeray-Léaz-Le Bouveret railway, and CEVA orbital railway. It was formerly the eastern terminus of the Annemasse-Genève-Eaux-Vives railway.

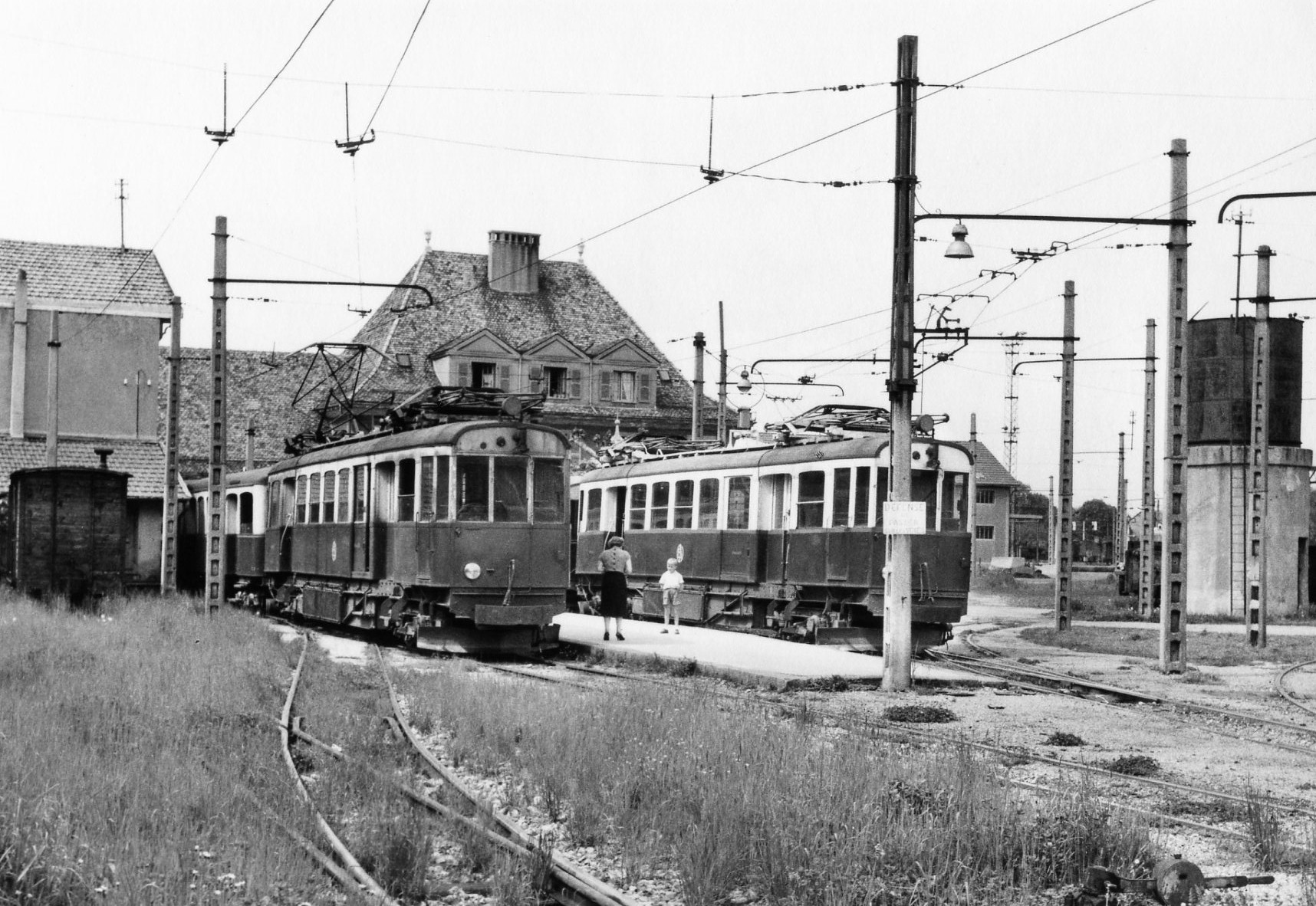
The CEN Réseau de la Haute-Savoie tramway terminus in 1955

In 1891 a 44 kilometres (27 mi) tramway from Annemasse to Samoëns operated by CEN Réseau de la Haute-Savoie started services from a terminus outside the front of the station. Four services per day were operated using steam tramway engines.

On 24 August 1932 a 10 kilometres (6.2 mi) extension to Sixt-Fer-à-Cheval was opened and at the same time the whole line was converted to electric traction. All tramway services were closed on 15 May 1959.

== Services ==
The train services are operated by SNCF and Léman Express.

As of the December 2025 timetable change, the following services stop at Annemasse:

- TGV: service between Paris-Lyon and Évian-les-Bains.
- TGV inOui: on weekends during the winter season, two round-trips per day between Paris-Lyon and Saint-Gervais-les-Bains-Le Fayet.
- RegioExpress: half-hourly service (hourly on weekends) to St-Maurice and hourly service to Martigny.
- TER Auvergne-Rhône-Alpes: regional service between Bellegarde and Évian-les-Bains, with further service from Bellegarde to Lyon-Part-Dieu.
- Léman Express:
  - L1 / L2 / L3 / L4: service every fifteen minutes to Coppet, every hour to Annecy, and every two hours to Évian-les-Bains and Saint-Gervais-les-Bains-Le Fayet.
  - L7: service to Geneva Airport, Vernier or Lancy-Pont-Rouge
