= Tannay railway station =

Railway station in Tannay, Switzerland

Tannay
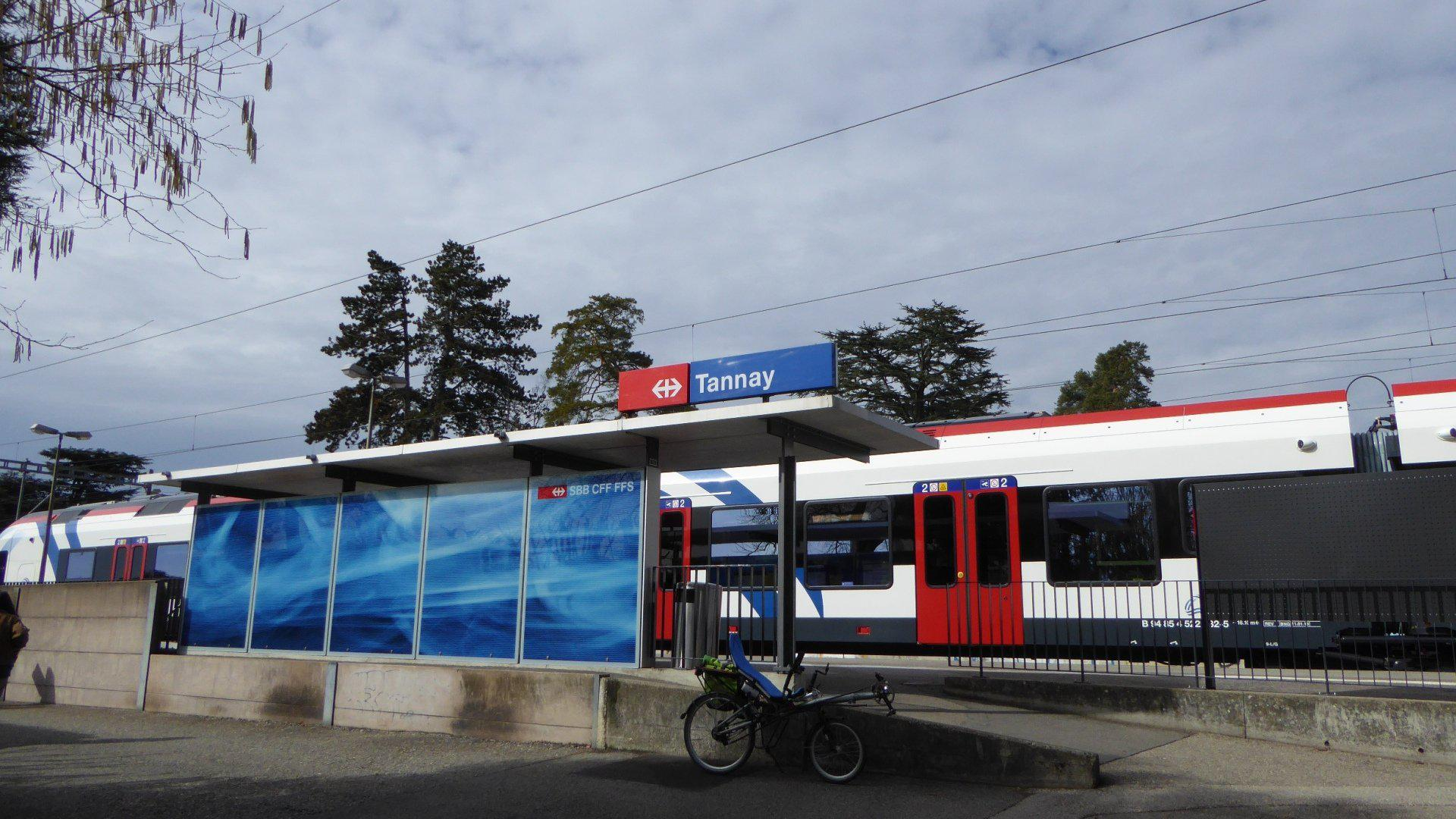
- An SBB train at the station in 2018

General information
- Location: Tannay; Switzerland
- Coordinates: 46°18′28″N 6°10′52″E
- Elevation: 392 m (1,286 ft)
- Owner: Swiss Federal Railways
- Line: Lausanne–Geneva line
- Distance: 48.2 km (30.0 mi) from Lausanne
- Platforms: 1 side platform
- Tracks: 3
- Train operators: Swiss Federal Railways

Construction
- Parking: 16
- Cycle facilities: 15
- Accessible: No

Other information
- Station code: 8501015 (TAN)
- Fare zone: 22 (mobilis)

Passengers
- 2023: 600 per weekday (SBB)

Services
Preceding station	Léman Express	Following station
Mies towards Évian-les-Bains	L1	Coppet Terminus
Mies towards Annecy	L2	Coppet Terminus
Mies towards Saint-Gervais	L3	Coppet Terminus
Mies towards Annemasse	L4	Coppet Terminus
Location
- Location within Switzerland Location within Canton of Vaud

Tannay railway station (French: Gare de Tannay) is a railway station in the municipality of Tannay, in the Swiss canton of Vaud. It is an intermediate stop on the standard gauge Lausanne–Geneva line of Swiss Federal Railways.

== Services ==
As of the December 2024 timetable change, the following services stop at Tannay:

- Léman Express L1 / L2 / L3 / L4: service every fifteen minutes between Coppet and Annemasse via Genève-Cornavin, from Annemasse every hour to Annecy, half-hourly or hourly service or service every two hours to Évian-les-Bains and every two hours to Saint-Gervais-les-Bains-Le Fayet.
