= Chavannes-des-Bois =

- Municipality
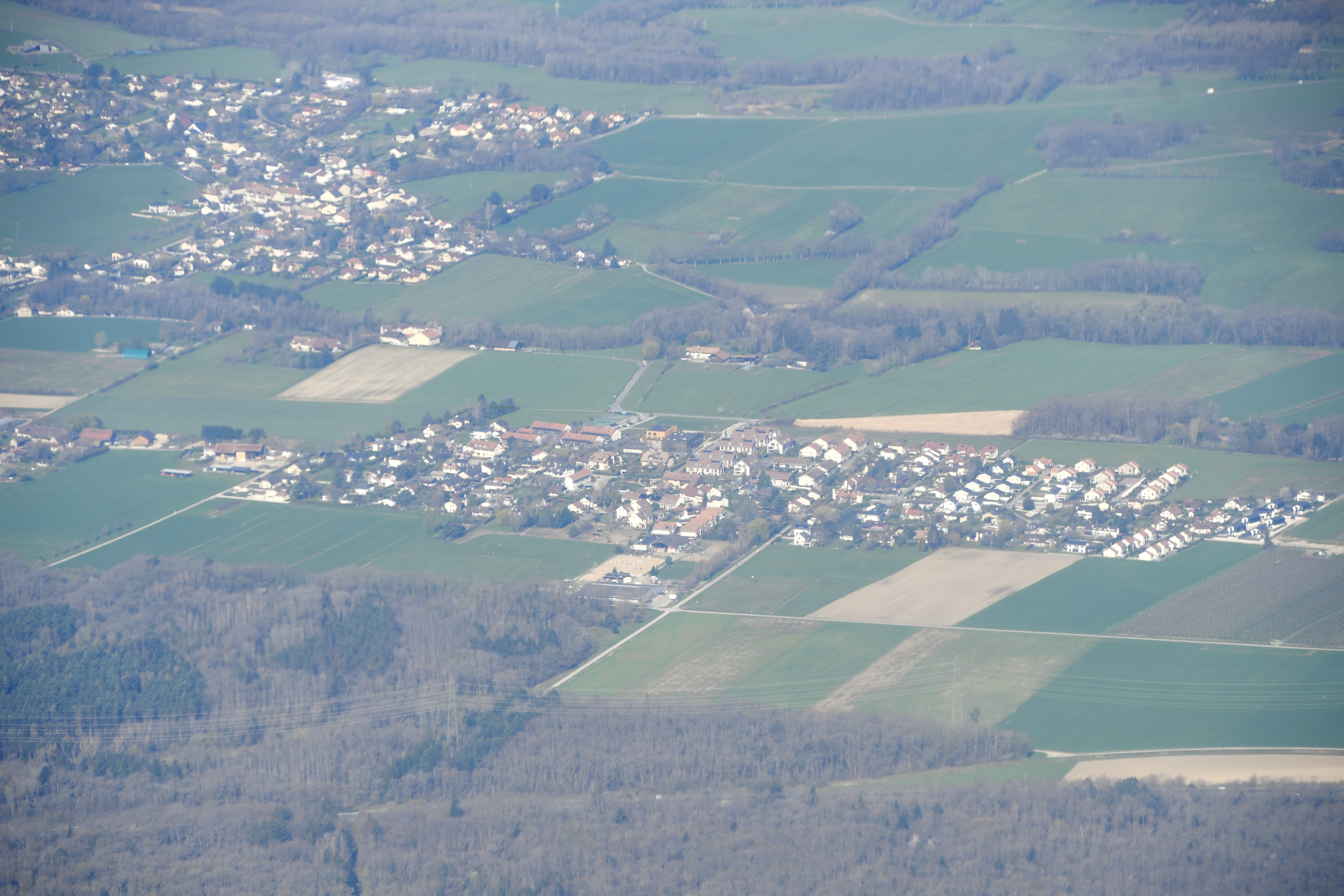
- Aerial view

- Flag Coat of arms
- Location of Chavannes-des-Bois
- Location within Switzerland Location within Canton of Vaud
- Coordinates: 46°19′N 6°8′E
- Country: Switzerland
- Canton: Vaud
- District: Nyon

Government
  - Mayor: Syndic

Area
  - Total: 2.13 km^{2} (0.82 sq mi)
- Elevation: 469 m (1,539 ft)

Population (2003)
  - Total: 387
  - Density: 182/km^{2} (471/sq mi)
- Time zone: UTC+01:00 (CET)
  - Summer (DST): UTC+02:00 (CEST)
- Postal code: 1290
- SFOS number: 5708
- ISO 3166 code: CH-VD
- Surrounded by: Commugny, Grilly (FR-01), Mies, Tannay, Versoix (GE)
- Website: http://www.chavannes-des-bois.ch Profile (in French), SFSO statistics

Chavannes-des-Bois (French pronunciation: [ʃavan de bwa]) is a municipality in the district of Nyon in the canton of Vaud in Switzerland.

Chavannes-des-Bois is first mentioned in 1316 as Les Chavannes de Sovernyer. In 1355 it was mentioned as Cabane Nemorum.

== Geography ==
Chavannes-des-Bois has an area, as of 2009, of 2.1 square kilometers (0.81 mi^{2}). Of this area, 1.1 km^{2} (0.42 mi^{2}) or 51.4% is used for agricultural purposes, while 0.79 km^{2} (0.31 mi^{2}) or 36.9% is forested. Of the rest of the land, 0.25 km^{2} (0.097 mi^{2}) or 11.7% is settled (buildings or roads), 0.02 km^{2} (4.9 acres) or 0.9% is either rivers or lakes and 0.01 km^{2} (2.5 acres) or 0.5% is unproductive land.

Of the built up area, housing and buildings made up 7.9% and transportation infrastructure made up 2.8%. Out of the forested land, all of the forested land area is covered with heavy forests. Of the agricultural land, 45.8% is used for growing crops and 2.8% is pastures, while 2.8% is used for orchards or vine crops. Of the water in the municipality, 0.5% is in lakes and 0.5% is in rivers and streams.

The municipality was part of the Nyon District until it was dissolved on 31 August 2006, and Chavannes-des-Bois became part of the new district of Nyon.

The municipality is located on the left bank of the Versoix on the borders with France and the Canton of Geneva.

== Coat of arms ==
The blazon of the municipal coat of arms is Per fess, 1. Argent, a House Sable; 2. Vert, a Bar wavy Argent.

== Demographics ==
Chavannes-des-Bois has a population (as of December 2020) of 1,002. As of 2008, 27.3% of the population are resident foreign nationals. Over the last 10 years (1999–2009 ) the population has changed at a rate of 18.5%. It has changed at a rate of 11.7% due to migration and at a rate of 6.4% due to births and deaths.

Most of the population (as of 2000) speaks French (332 or 73.8%), with German being second most common (42 or 9.3%) and English being third (36 or 8.0%). There are 12 people who speak Italian.

The age distribution, as of 2009, in Chavannes-des-Bois is; 54 children or 10.9% of the population are between 0 and 9 years old and 85 teenagers or 17.2% are between 10 and 19. Of the adult population, 41 people or 8.3% of the population are between 20 and 29 years old. 53 people or 10.7% are between 30 and 39, 100 people or 20.2% are between 40 and 49, and 63 people or 12.7% are between 50 and 59. The senior population distribution is 67 people or 13.5% of the population are between 60 and 69 years old, 23 people or 4.6% are between 70 and 79, there are 7 people or 1.4% who are between 80 and 89, and there are 2 people or 0.4% who are 90 and older.

As of 2000, there were 189 people who were single and never married in the municipality. There were 233 married individuals, 10 widows or widowers and 18 individuals who are divorced.

As of 2000, there were 156 private households in the municipality, and an average of 2.8 persons per household. There were 31 households that consist of only one person and 17 households with five or more people. Out of a total of 158 households that answered this question, 19.6% were households made up of just one person. Of the rest of the households, there are 44 married couples without children, 71 married couples with children There were 8 single parents with a child or children. There were 2 households that were made up of unrelated people and 2 households that were made up of some sort of institution or another collective housing.

In 2000 there were 118 single family homes (or 88.7% of the total) out of a total of 133 inhabited buildings. There were 9 multi-family buildings (6.8%), along with 4 multi-purpose buildings that were mostly used for housing (3.0%) and 2 other use buildings (commercial or industrial) that also had some housing (1.5%).

In 2000, a total of 141 apartments (88.7% of the total) were permanently occupied, while 13 apartments (8.2%) were seasonally occupied and 5 apartments (3.1%) were empty. As of 2009, the construction rate of new housing units was 38.6 new units per 1000 residents. The vacancy rate for the municipality, in 2010, was 2.17%.

The historical population is given in the following chart:

== Politics ==
In the 2007 federal election the most popular party was the SVP which received 22.01% of the vote. The next three most popular parties were the Green Party (15.44%), the LPS Party (13.67%) and the FDP (13.51%). In the federal election, a total of 109 votes were cast, and the voter turnout was 46.8%.

== Economy ==
As of 2010, Chavannes-des-Bois had an unemployment rate of 3.8%. As of 2008, there were 11 people employed in the primary economic sector and about 2 businesses involved in this sector. No one was employed in the secondary sector. 26 people were employed in the tertiary sector, with 7 businesses in this sector. There were 237 residents of the municipality who were employed in some capacity, of which females made up 44.3% of the workforce.

In 2008 the total number of full-time equivalent jobs was 27. The number of jobs in the primary sector was 9, all of which were in agriculture. There were no jobs in the secondary sector. The number of jobs in the tertiary sector was 18. In the tertiary sector; 2 or 11.1% were in wholesale or retail sales or the repair of motor vehicles, 4 or 22.2% were in a hotel or restaurant, 4 or 22.2% were technical professionals or scientists, 6 or 33.3% were in education.

In 2000, there were 29 workers who commuted into the municipality and 220 workers who commuted away. The municipality is a net exporter of workers, with about 7.6 workers leaving the municipality for every one entering. About 17.2% of the workforce coming into Chavannes-des-Bois are coming from outside Switzerland. Of the working population, 10.5% used public transportation to get to work, and 81% used a private car.

== Religion ==
From the 2000 census, 145 or 32.2% were Roman Catholic, while 130 or 28.9% belonged to the Swiss Reformed Church. Of the rest of the population, there was 1 member of an Orthodox church, and there were 5 individuals (or about 1.11% of the population) who belonged to another Christian church. There were 2 individuals (or about 0.44% of the population) who were Jewish, and 6 (or about 1.33% of the population) who were Islamic. There were 4 individuals who were Buddhist. 118 (or about 26.22% of the population) belonged to no church, are agnostic or atheist, and 39 individuals (or about 8.67% of the population) did not answer the question.

== Education ==
In Chavannes-des-Bois about 133 or (29.6%) of the population have completed non-mandatory upper secondary education, and 123 or (27.3%) have completed additional higher education (either university or a Fachhochschule). Of the 123 who completed tertiary schooling, 48.8% were Swiss men, 24.4% were Swiss women, 16.3% were non-Swiss men and 10.6% were non-Swiss women.

In the 2009/2010 school year there were a total of 20 students in the Chavannes-des-Bois school district. In the Vaud cantonal school system, two years of non-obligatory pre-school are provided by the political districts. During the school year, the political district provided pre-school care for a total of 1,249 children of which 563 children (45.1%) received subsidized pre-school care. The canton's primary school program requires students to attend for four years. There were 14 students in the municipal primary school program. The obligatory lower secondary school program lasts for six years and there were 6 students in those schools.

As of 2000, there was one student in Chavannes-des-Bois who came from another municipality, while 101 residents attended schools outside the municipality.
