= Mies, Switzerland =

Mies
- Municipality
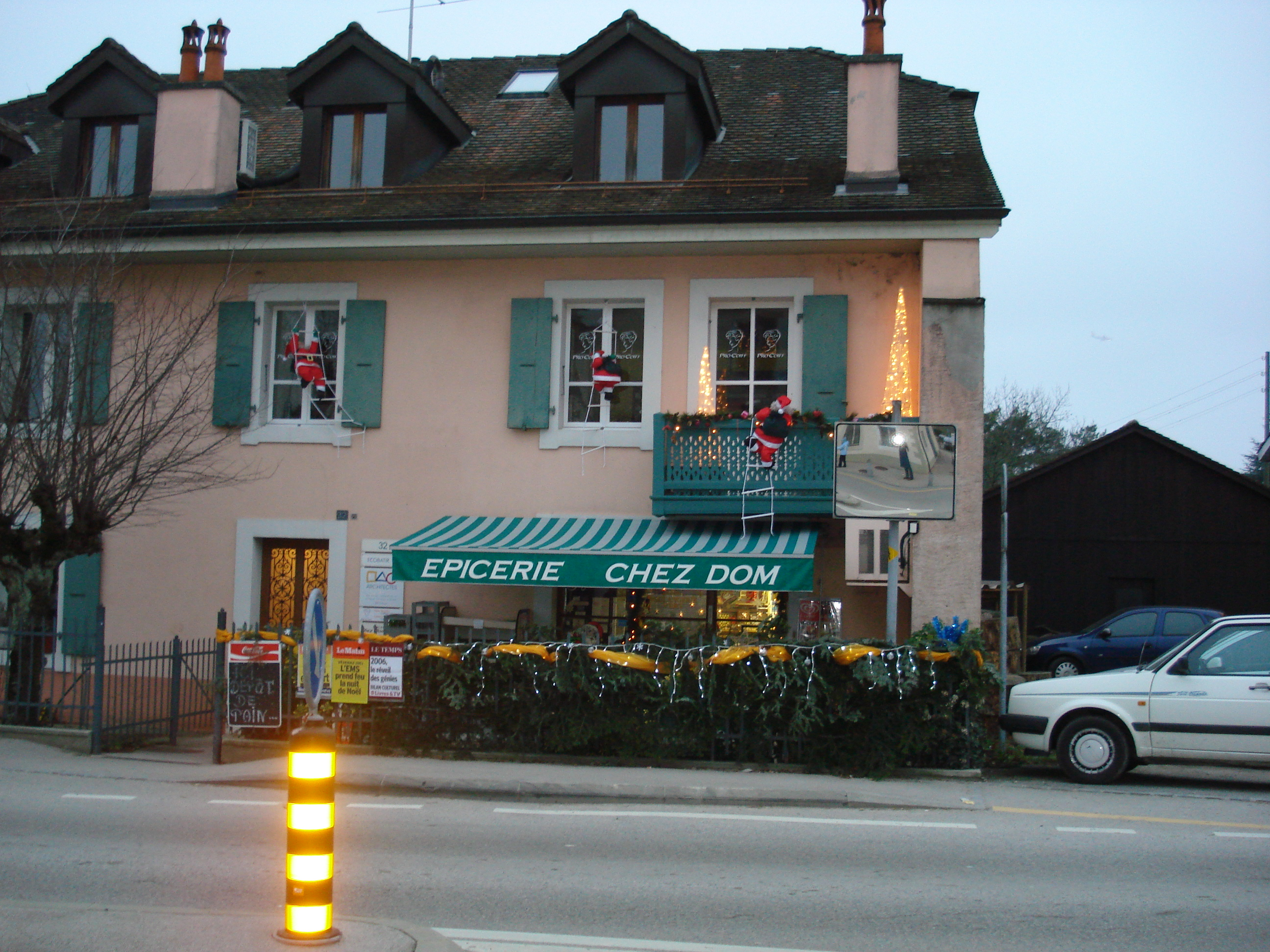

- Flag Coat of arms
- Location of Mies
- Location within Switzerland Location within Canton of Vaud
- Coordinates: 46°18′N 06°10′E
- Country: Switzerland
- Canton: Vaud
- District: Nyon

Government
  - Mayor: Syndic; Pierre-Alain Schmidt

Area
  - Total: 3.47 km^{2} (1.34 sq mi)
- Elevation: 410 m (1,350 ft)

Population (2004)
  - Total: 1,693
  - Density: 488/km^{2} (1,260/sq mi)
- Time zone: UTC+01:00 (CET)
  - Summer (DST): UTC+02:00 (CEST)
- Postal code: 1295
- SFOS number: 5723
- ISO 3166 code: CH-VD
- Surrounded by: Tannay, Chavannes-des-Bois, Versoix (GE)
- Website: www.mies.ch

Mies (French pronunciation: [mi]) is a municipality in the district of Nyon in the canton of Vaud in Switzerland. Mies is one of the communes of the Canton de Vaud which are collectively known as the "Terre-Sainte".

Located approximately halfway between Geneva and Nyon, Mies sits on Lake Geneva (Lac Léman), which lies to the southeast. The highest point of Mies is 455m above sea level. To the southwest lies Versoix, in the Canton of Geneva and to the northwest Chavannes-de-Bogis, which houses a major shopping mall. To the north and west lie the Communes of Tannay, Bogis-Bossey, and Coppet. Mies is separated from the neighbouring commune of Tannay by a small ravine containing a stream called le nant du Torry.

== History ==
It is thought that the name Mies comes from its location of half way ("mi-") between Geneva and Nyon, or maybe because it is halfway between Versoix and Coppet. Remains of settlements have been found all the way back to the Bronze Age, but the first documentary reference to Mies was in 1345 under the name Miez. Later on, additional ways of writing the village appeared: Miez, Mier, Myez, Myer, Myes and only in 1912 Mies. With the conquest of the Canton de Vaud (Waadt, in German) by Bern in the year 1536, the village came under the administration of the district of Nyon. Mies thus became Switzerland's border village - with France - from 1536 until the creation of the Canton of Geneva in 1815.

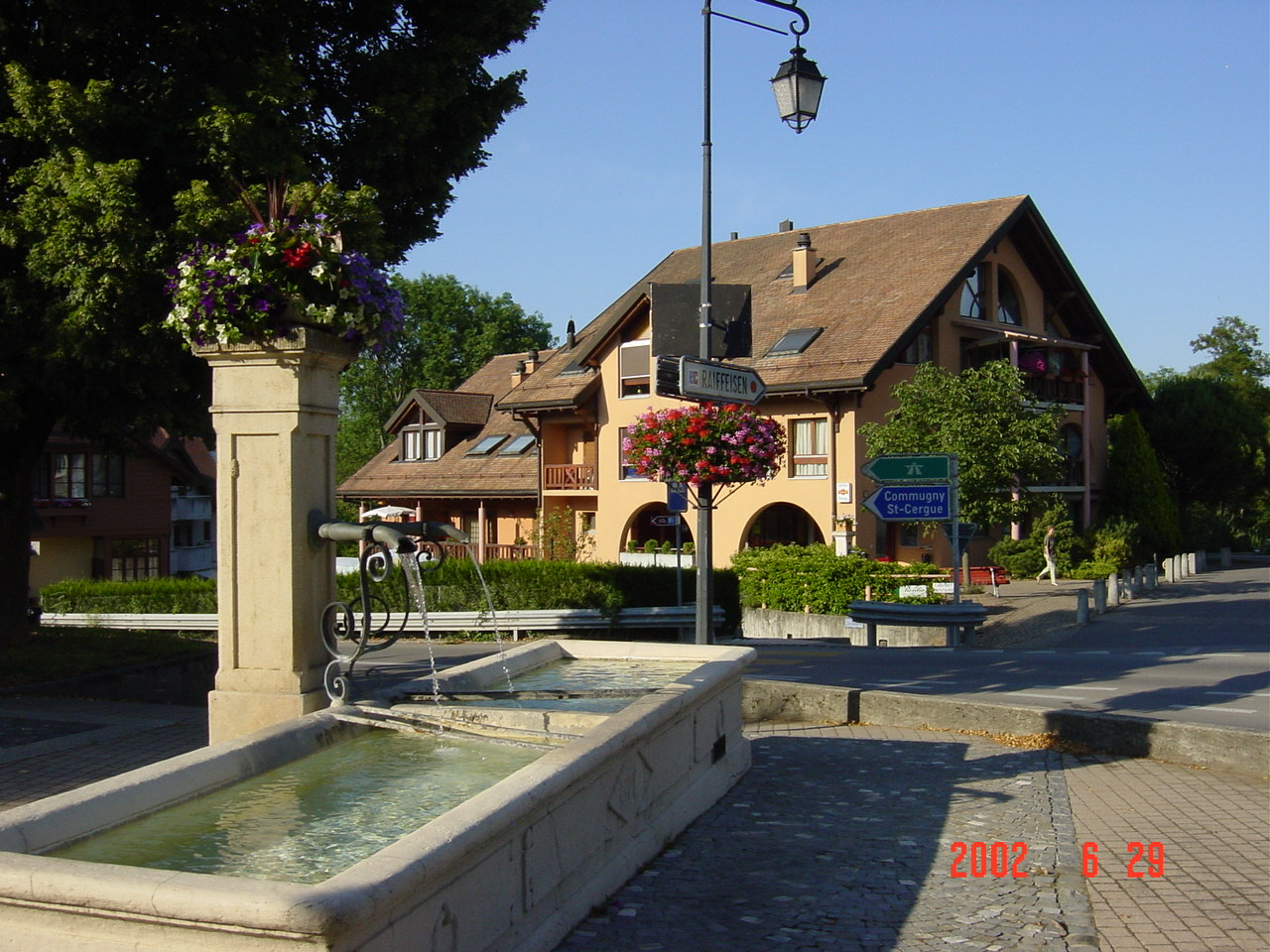
Village center

== Recreation ==
The playing fields of Mies include a full size football field, basketball pitch, boules (pétanque), running track, tennis courts, and children's playground with swings, climbing frames and other children's games. The clubhouse has showers and toilets, as well as a snack bar, but these facilities are generally only open when football matches are being played on the sports field.

There is a polo field, Polo de Veytay, where several polo matches are played every year, such as the Geneva Polo Masters. This is part of the large agricultural and forest area known as Domaine de Veytay, in the North-West of the commune and which takes up about 40% of the area of the commune or some 150 hectares. Photos

Right on the border of the commune, but on the Versoix side is the Versoix Sports Centre, which includes a swimming pool.

Mies has a public beach on Lake Geneva. This is popular in the summer months and several bar-b-Qs have been set up. Photos

== Nature reserves ==
The Domaine de Veytay contains a nature reserve known as la Gouille Marion covering 7 hectares. Although private land, there are no restrictions on walking through the forest, visiting a large pond, and viewing the birds from some watch-sheds in the forest. Originally la Gouille Marion was boggy marshland which became flooded in the winter. However, in 1972 l'Association pour la Protection des Bois de la Rive Droit du Lac (Society for the protection of woodlands on the north side of the lake), carried out work which gave birth to the large pond in which two small islands were built. A ditch was also constructed in order to control the level of water. A bird observatory was built to allow ornithologists to watch the birds without disturbing them. In 1973 la Gouille Marion was classified as a nature reserve and it is forbidden to leave the paths during the nesting season from 1 March to 1 August. Hunting is also forbidden and dogs must be kept on their leads. The forest and pond hold many species of birds, insects, amphibians including various frogs and toads, and mammals such as deer, wild boar and foxes which drink from the pond. Photos

Mies has a second nature reserve, Les Crénées, on the lakeshore, which is also private property, but not accessible to the public.

== Geography ==
Mies has an area, as of 2009, of 3.5 square kilometers (1.4 mi^{2}). Of this area, 1.16 km^{2} (0.45 mi^{2}) or 33.6% is used for agricultural purposes, while 1.12 km^{2} (0.43 mi^{2}) or 32.5% is forested. Of the rest of the land, 1.18 km^{2} (0.46 mi^{2}) or 34.2% is settled (buildings or roads), 0.02 km^{2} (4.9 acres) or 0.6% is either rivers or lakes and 0.01 km^{2} (2.5 acres) or 0.3% is unproductive land.

Of the built up area, housing and buildings made up 26.7% and transportation infrastructure made up 4.1%. Power and water infrastructure as well as other special developed areas made up 1.2% of the area while parks, green belts and sports fields made up 1.7%. Out of the forested land, 31.0% of the total land area is heavily forested and 1.4% is covered with orchards or small clusters of trees. Of the agricultural land, 18.3% is used for growing crops and 11.9% is pastures, while 3.5% is used for orchards or vine crops. All the water in the municipality is in lakes.

The municipality was part of the Nyon District until it was dissolved on 31 August 2006, and Mies became part of the new district of Nyon.

The municipality is located on a terrace above Lake Geneva.

== Transportation ==
=== Rail ===
Mies lies on the main railway line between Geneva and Lausanne, built in 1858. The train station at Mies is served by local trains, the Leman Express, running north to Coppet or south to Versoix and Geneva and onwards to Annemasse and neighbouring France. Services run every 15 minutes throughout the day and evening and hourly at night.

=== Bus ===
The nearest public buses are TPG lines 50 and 54, which run from just outside Mies at the "Centre Sportif la Bécassière" (otherwise known as the Versoix Swimming Pool) towards the airport. It is a walk along mainly pedestrian and cycle tracks from La Bécassière to Mies village. Both routes cross through small villages on the way to the airport.

== Coat of arms ==
The blazon of the municipal coat of arms is Per pale Or and Azure, from a Hill Sable lined Argent rising three Pine-trees Vert.

== Demographics ==
Mies has a population (as of December 2020) of 2,165. As of 2008, 40.6% of the population are resident foreign nationals. Over the last 10 years (1999–2009 ) the population has changed at a rate of 18.9%. It has changed at a rate of 17.8% due to migration and at a rate of 1.2% due to births and deaths.

Most of the population (as of 2000) speaks French (1,095 or 73.0%), with English being second most common (152 or 10.1%) and German being third (98 or 6.5%). There are 42 people who speak Italian and 1 person who speaks Romansh.

The age distribution, as of 2009, in Mies is; 186 children or 11.7% of the population are between 0 and 9 years old and 240 teenagers or 15.1% are between 10 and 19. Of the adult population, 150 people or 9.4% of the population are between 20 and 29 years old. 178 people or 11.2% are between 30 and 39, 280 people or 17.6% are between 40 and 49, and 218 people or 13.7% are between 50 and 59. The senior population distribution is 173 people or 10.9% of the population are between 60 and 69 years old, 93 people or 5.9% are between 70 and 79, there are 57 people or 3.6% who are between 80 and 89, and there are 14 people or 0.9% who are 90 and older.

As of 2000, there were 633 people who were single and never married in the municipality. There were 699 married individuals, 84 widows or widowers and 83 individuals who are divorced.

As of 2000, there were 528 private households in the municipality, and an average of 2.6 persons per household. There were 150 households that consist of only one person and 52 households with five or more people. Out of a total of 542 households that answered this question, 27.7% were households made up of just one person and there were 6 adults who lived with their parents. Of the rest of the households, there are 127 married couples without children, 201 married couples with children There were 34 single parents with a child or children. There were 10 households that were made up of unrelated people and 14 households that were made up of some sort of institution or another collective housing.

In 2000 there were 320 single family homes (or 78.2% of the total) out of a total of 409 inhabited buildings. There were 50 multi-family buildings (12.2%), along with 29 multi-purpose buildings that were mostly used for housing (7.1%) and 10 other use buildings (commercial or industrial) that also had some housing (2.4%).

In 2000, a total of 509 apartments (83.9% of the total) were permanently occupied, while 64 apartments (10.5%) were seasonally occupied and 34 apartments (5.6%) were empty. As of 2009, the construction rate of new housing units was 4.5 new units per 1000 residents. The vacancy rate for the municipality, in 2010, was 0%.

The historical population is given in the following chart:

== Politics ==
In the 2007 federal election the most popular party was the SVP which received 24.1% of the vote. The next three most popular parties were the LPS Party (21.25%), the SP (13.09%) and the Green Party (12.63%). In the federal election, a total of 347 votes were cast, and the voter turnout was 42.9%.

== Economy ==
As of 2010, Mies had an unemployment rate of 4.4%. As of 2008, there were 15 people employed in the primary economic sector and about 7 businesses involved in this sector. 124 people were employed in the secondary sector and there were 16 businesses in this sector. 528 people were employed in the tertiary sector, with 72 businesses in this sector. There were 756 residents of the municipality who were employed in some capacity, of which females made up 43.4% of the workforce.

In 2008 the total number of full-time equivalent jobs was 560. The number of jobs in the primary sector was 13, of which 9 were in agriculture and 4 were in fishing or fisheries. The number of jobs in the secondary sector was 120 of which 105 or (87.5%) were in manufacturing and 16 (13.3%) were in construction. The number of jobs in the tertiary sector was 427. In the tertiary sector; 75 or 17.6% were in wholesale or retail sales or the repair of motor vehicles, 10 or 2.3% were in the movement and storage of goods, 4 or 0.9% were in a hotel or restaurant, 5 or 1.2% were in the information industry, 4 or 0.9% were the insurance or financial industry, 51 or 11.9% were technical professionals or scientists, 26 or 6.1% were in education and 97 or 22.7% were in health care.

In 2000, there were 427 workers who commuted into the municipality and 609 workers who commuted away. The municipality is a net exporter of workers, with about 1.4 workers leaving the municipality for every one entering. About 15.2% of the workforce coming into Mies are coming from outside Switzerland. Of the working population, 14.4% used public transportation to get to work, and 69.2% used a private car.

== Religion ==
From the 2000 census, 500 or 33.4% were Roman Catholic, while 476 or 31.8% belonged to the Swiss Reformed Church. Of the rest of the population, there were 15 members of an Orthodox church (or about 1.00% of the population), there were 4 individuals (or about 0.27% of the population) who belonged to the Christian Catholic Church, and there were 59 individuals (or about 3.94% of the population) who belonged to another Christian church. There were 18 individuals (or about 1.20% of the population) who were Jewish, and 26 (or about 1.73% of the population) who were Islamic. There were 3 individuals who were Buddhist, 6 individuals who were Hindu and 1 individual who belonged to another church. 256 (or about 17.08% of the population) belonged to no church, are agnostic or atheist, and 161 individuals (or about 10.74% of the population) did not answer the question.

== Education ==
In Mies about 393 or (26.2%) of the population have completed non-mandatory upper secondary education, and 439 or (29.3%) have completed additional higher education (either university or a Fachhochschule). Of the 439 who completed tertiary schooling, 36.7% were Swiss men, 26.7% were Swiss women, 19.8% were non-Swiss men and 16.9% were non-Swiss women.

In the 2009/2010 school year there were a total of 133 students in the Mies school district. In the Vaud cantonal school system, two years of non-obligatory pre-school are provided by the political districts. During the school year, the political district provided pre-school care for a total of 1,249 children of which 563 children (45.1%) received subsidized pre-school care. The canton's primary school program requires students to attend for four years. There were 83 students in the municipal primary school program. The obligatory lower secondary school program lasts for six years and there were 49 students in those schools. There was also 1 student who was home schooled or attended another non-traditional school.

As of 2000, there were 50 students in Mies who came from another municipality, while 238 residents attended schools outside the municipality.

== Sports ==
Mies is home to the headquarters of FIBA, the international governing body of basketball and the Fédération Internationale de Motocyclisme (FIM), the international governing body of motorcycle racing.

== Notable residents ==
- Simone de Montmollin (born 1968), Swiss politician and oenologist, grew up in Mies

== Image gallery ==
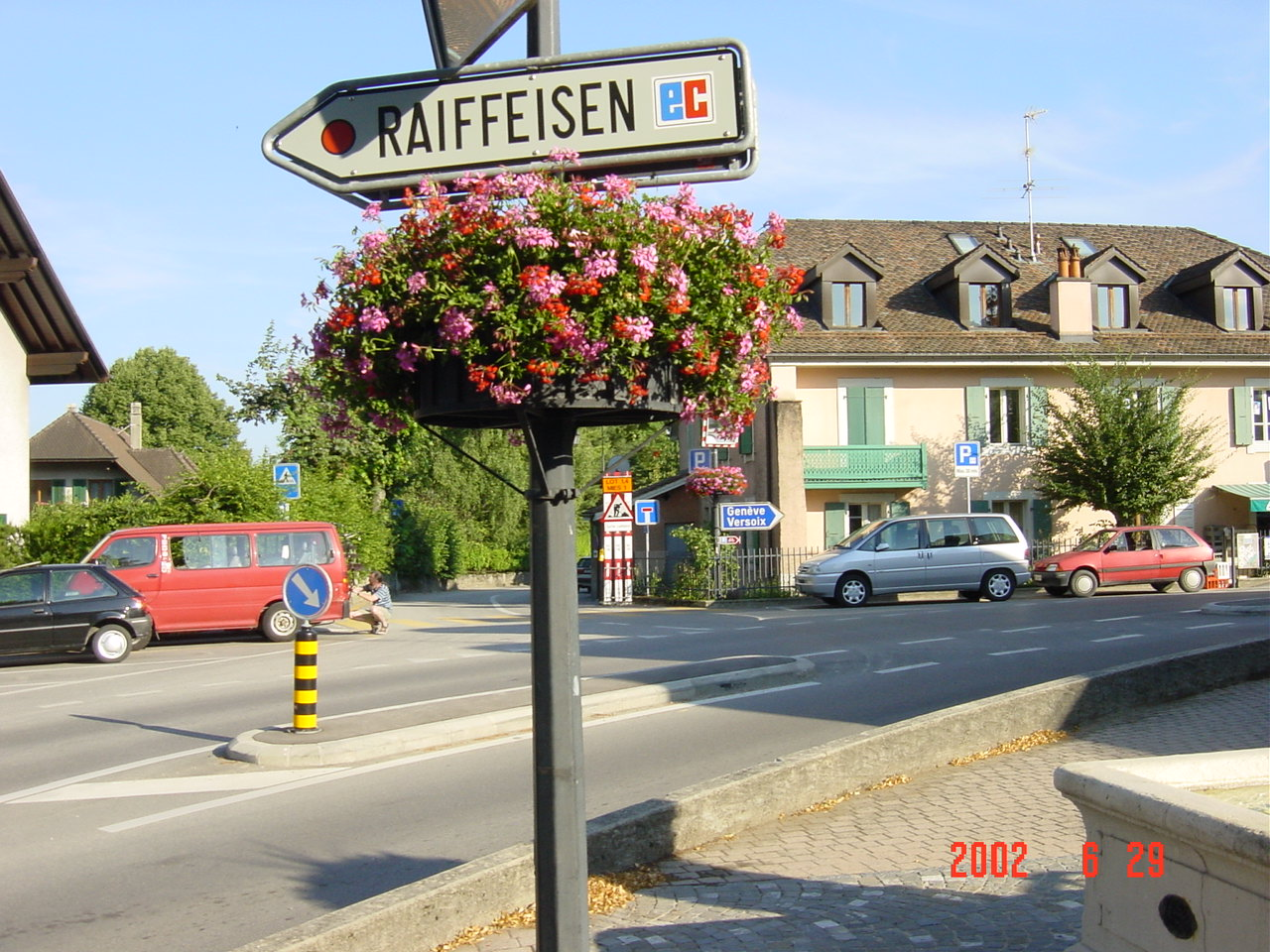
Picture of the village centre

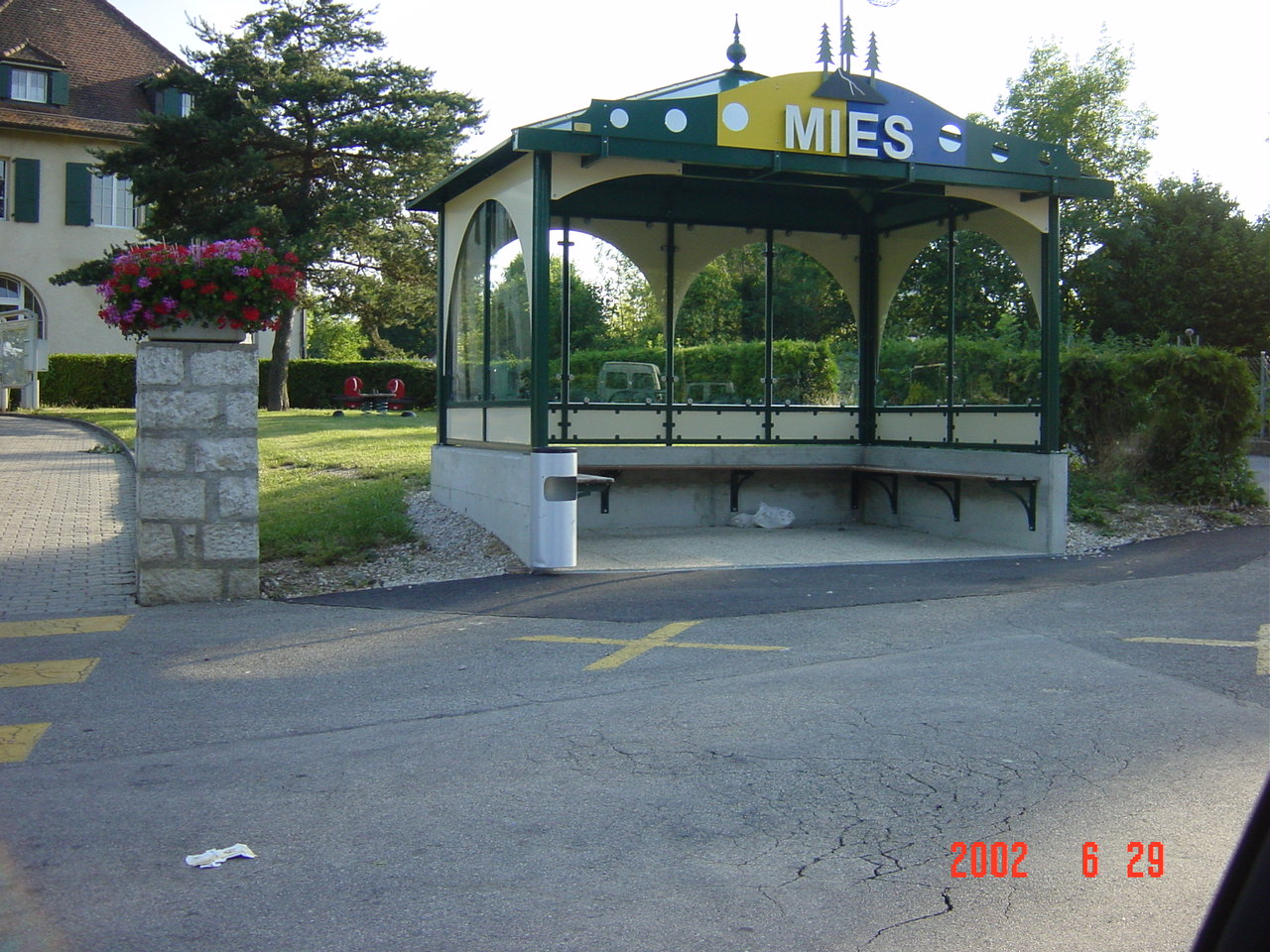
School bus stop in front of the Town Hall (Old School)

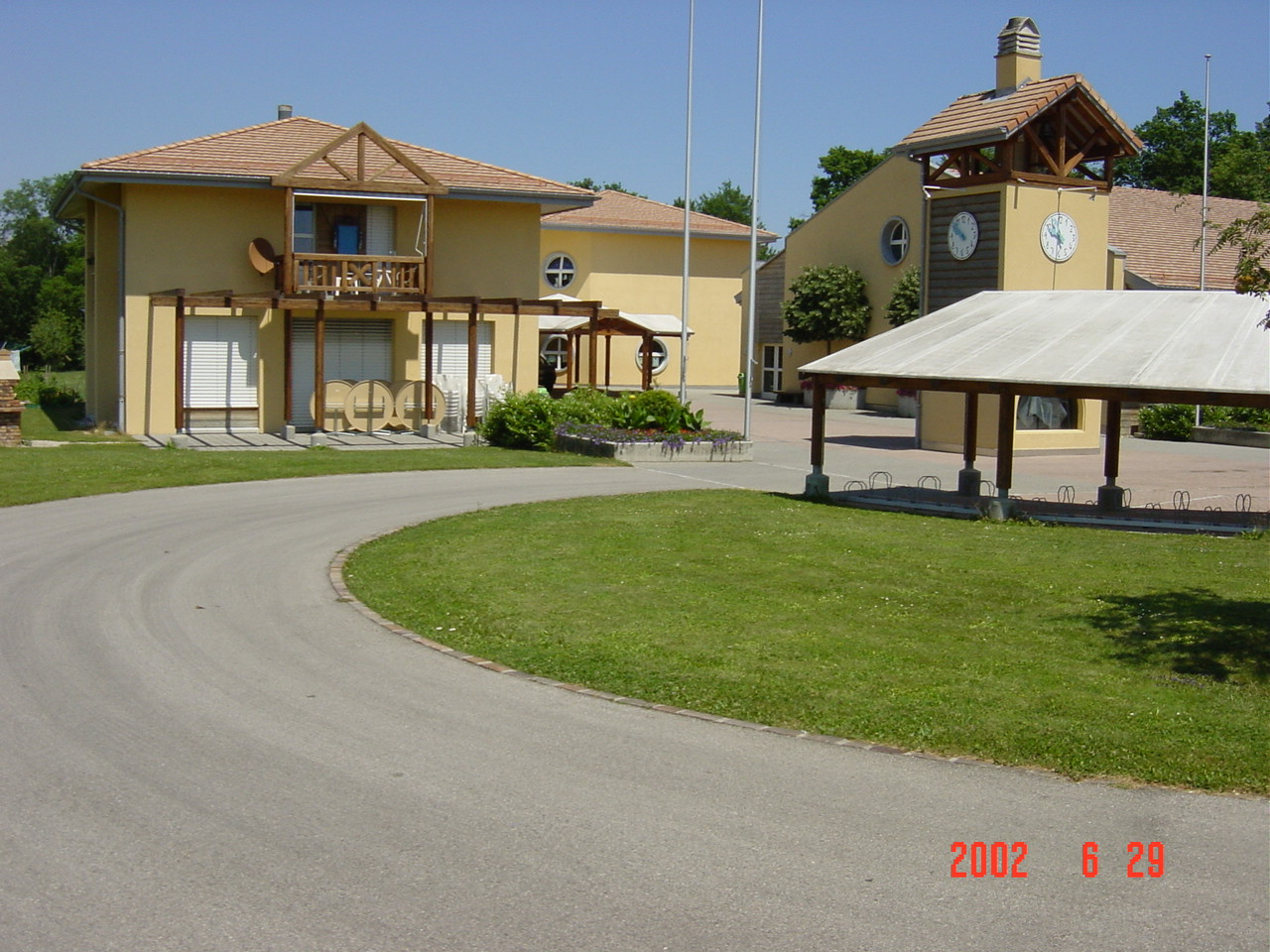
Primary School, "Les Sorbiers"

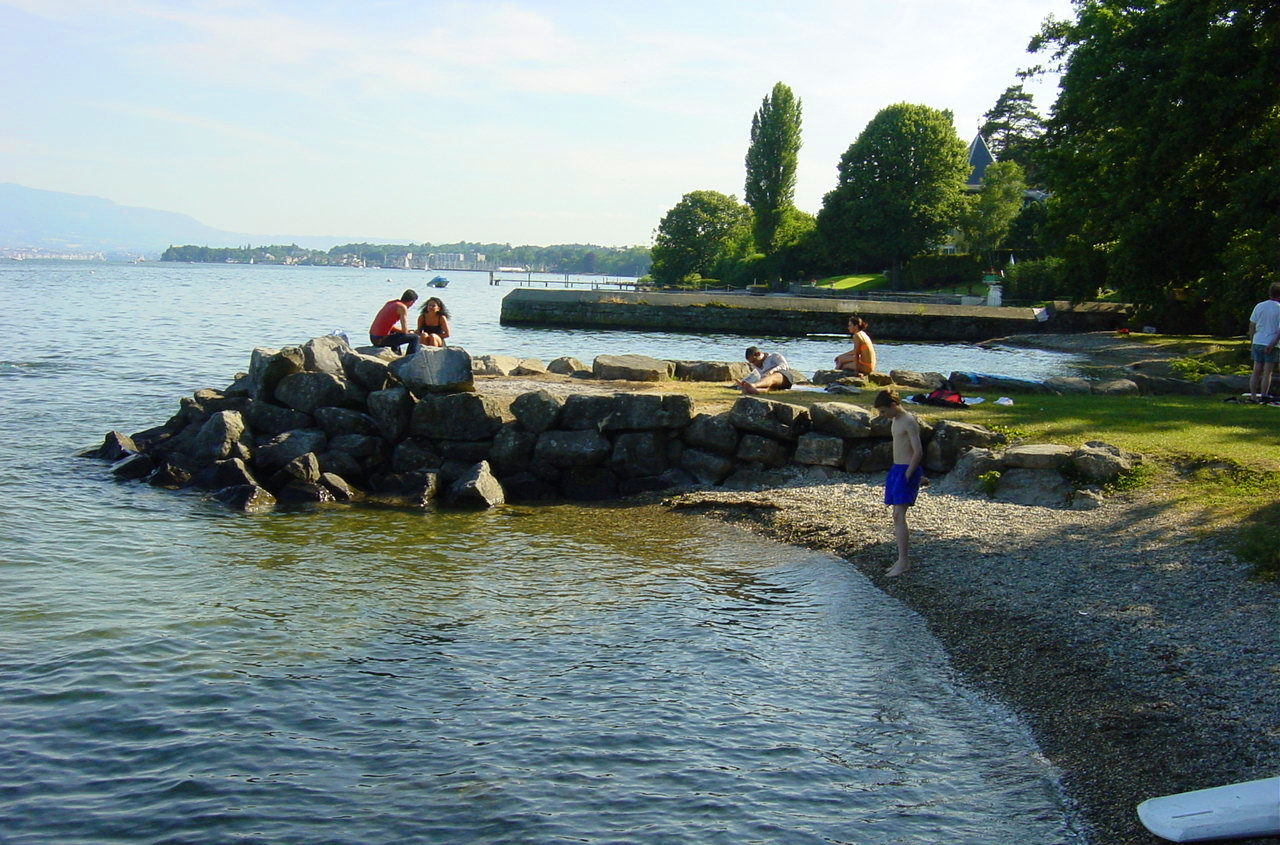
The edge of Lake Geneva (The Public Beach)

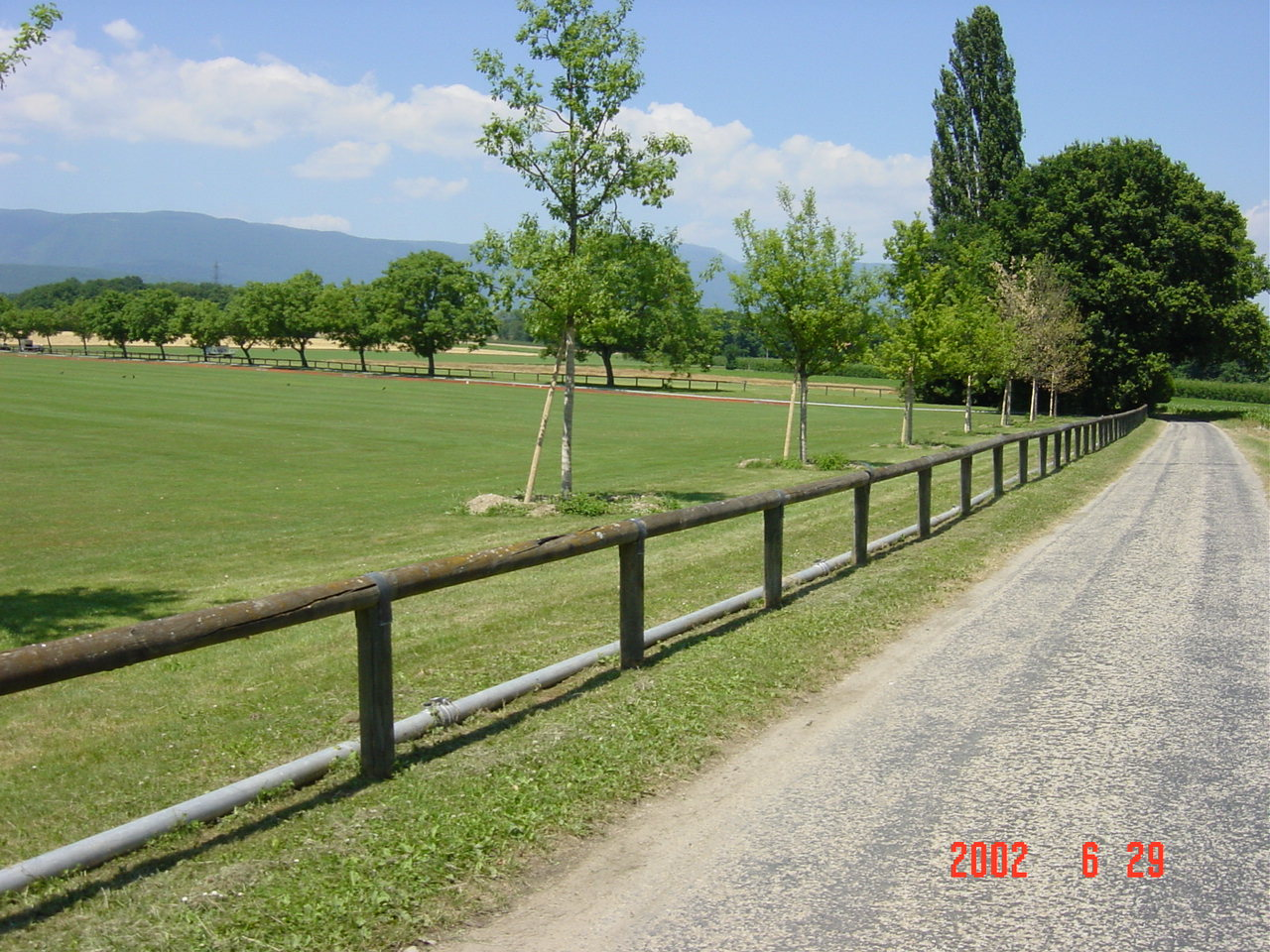
Veytay, Countryside walks

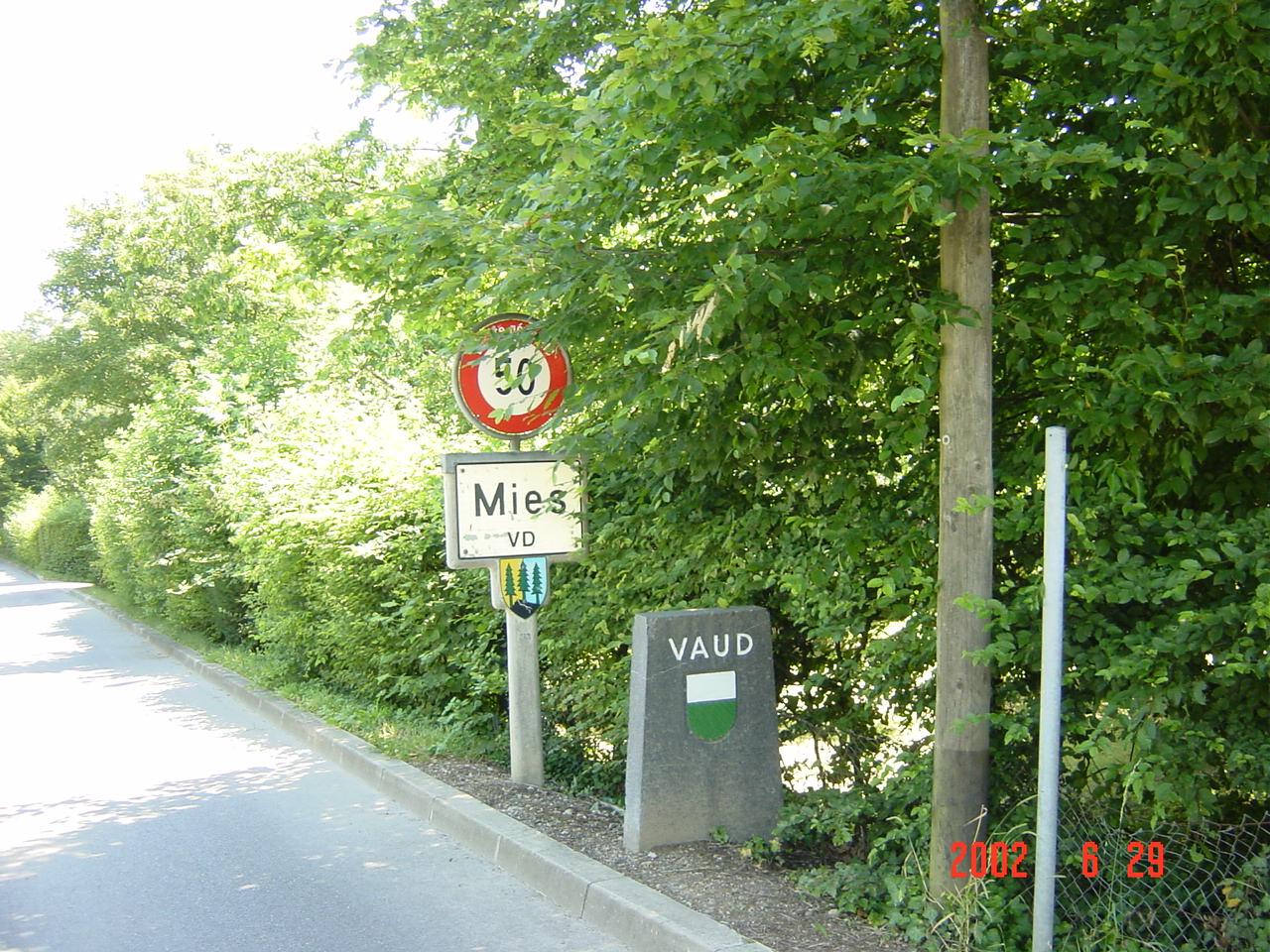
Entering Mies

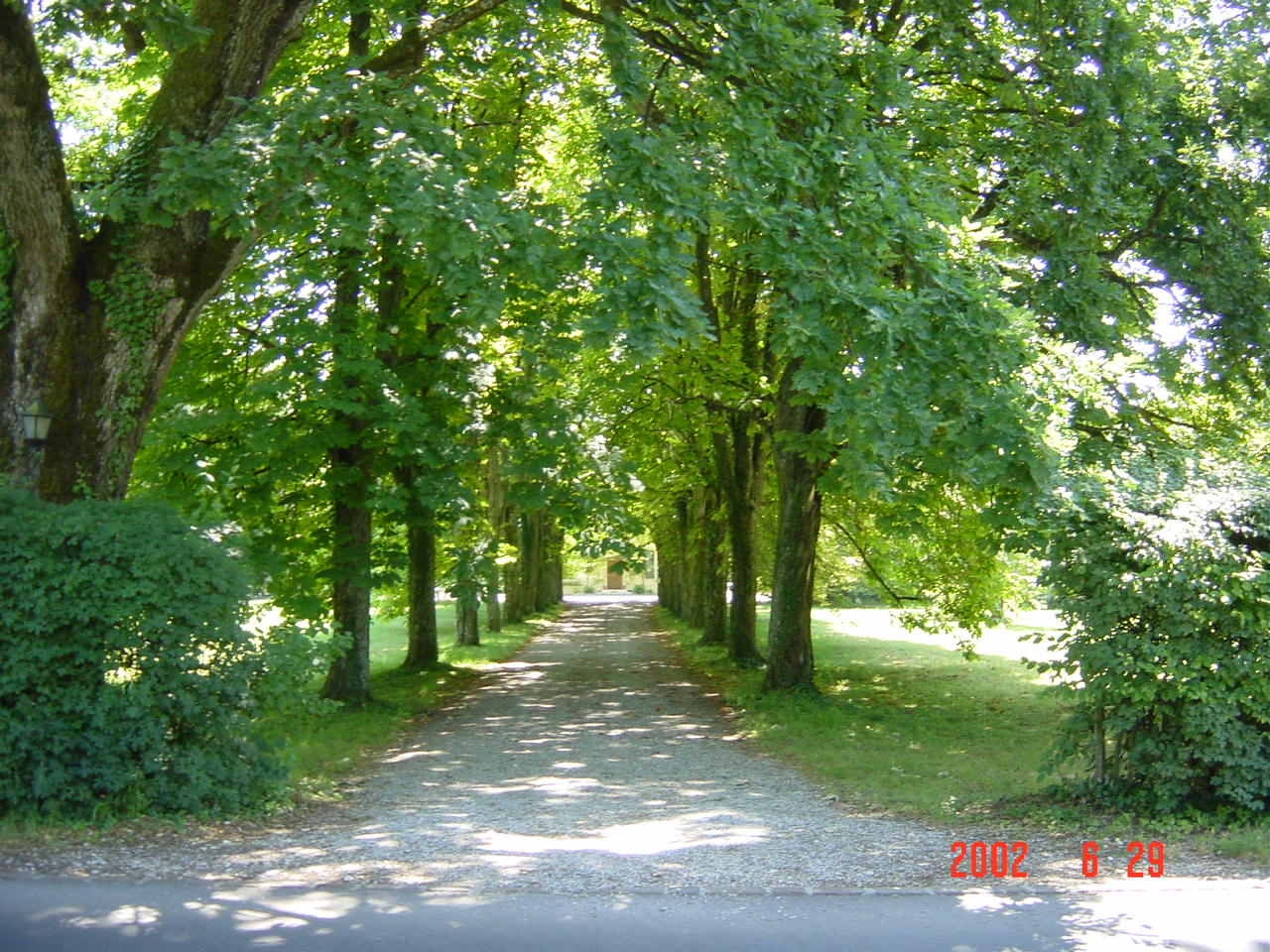
Forest path

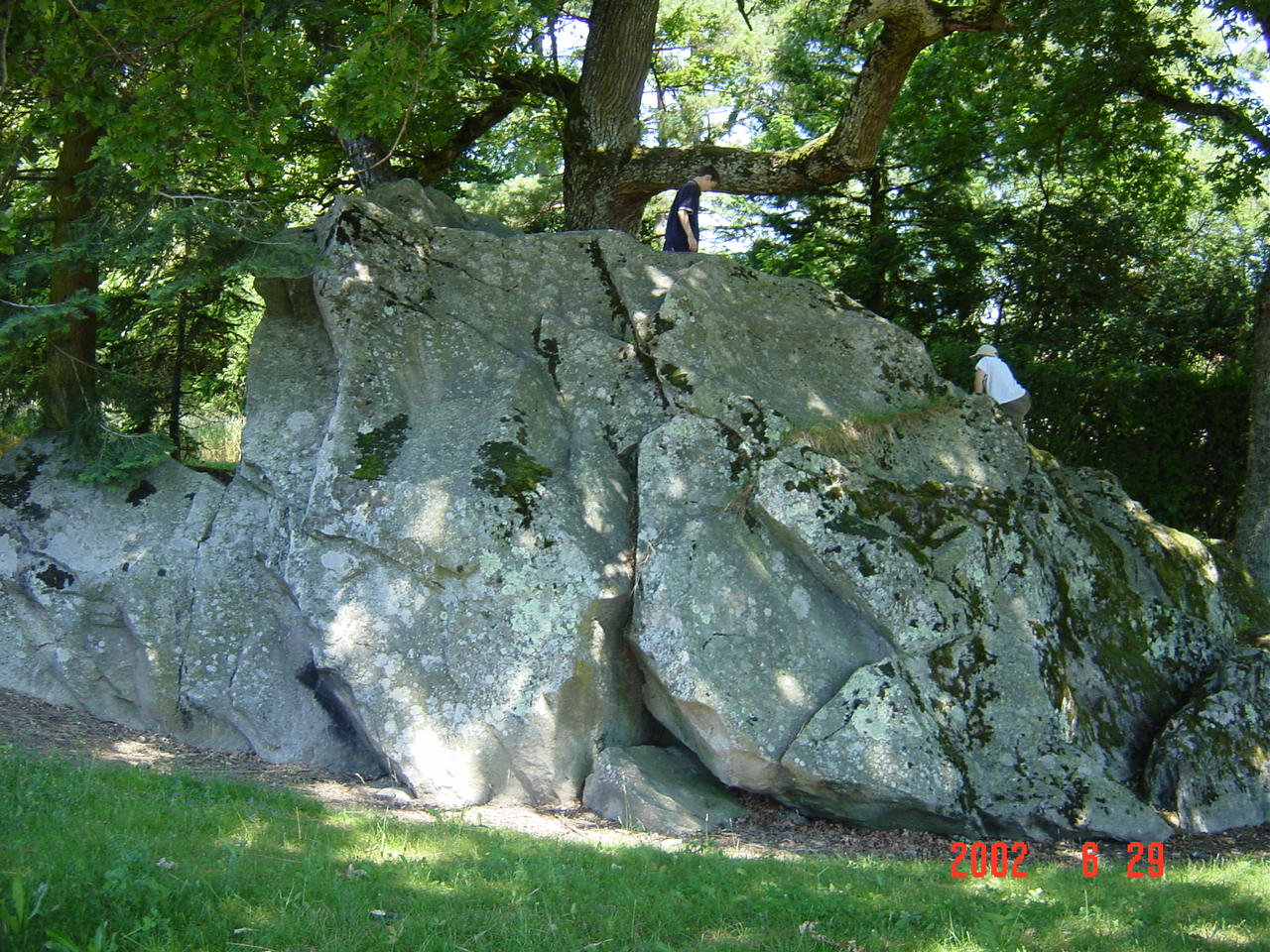
Pierre à Penys

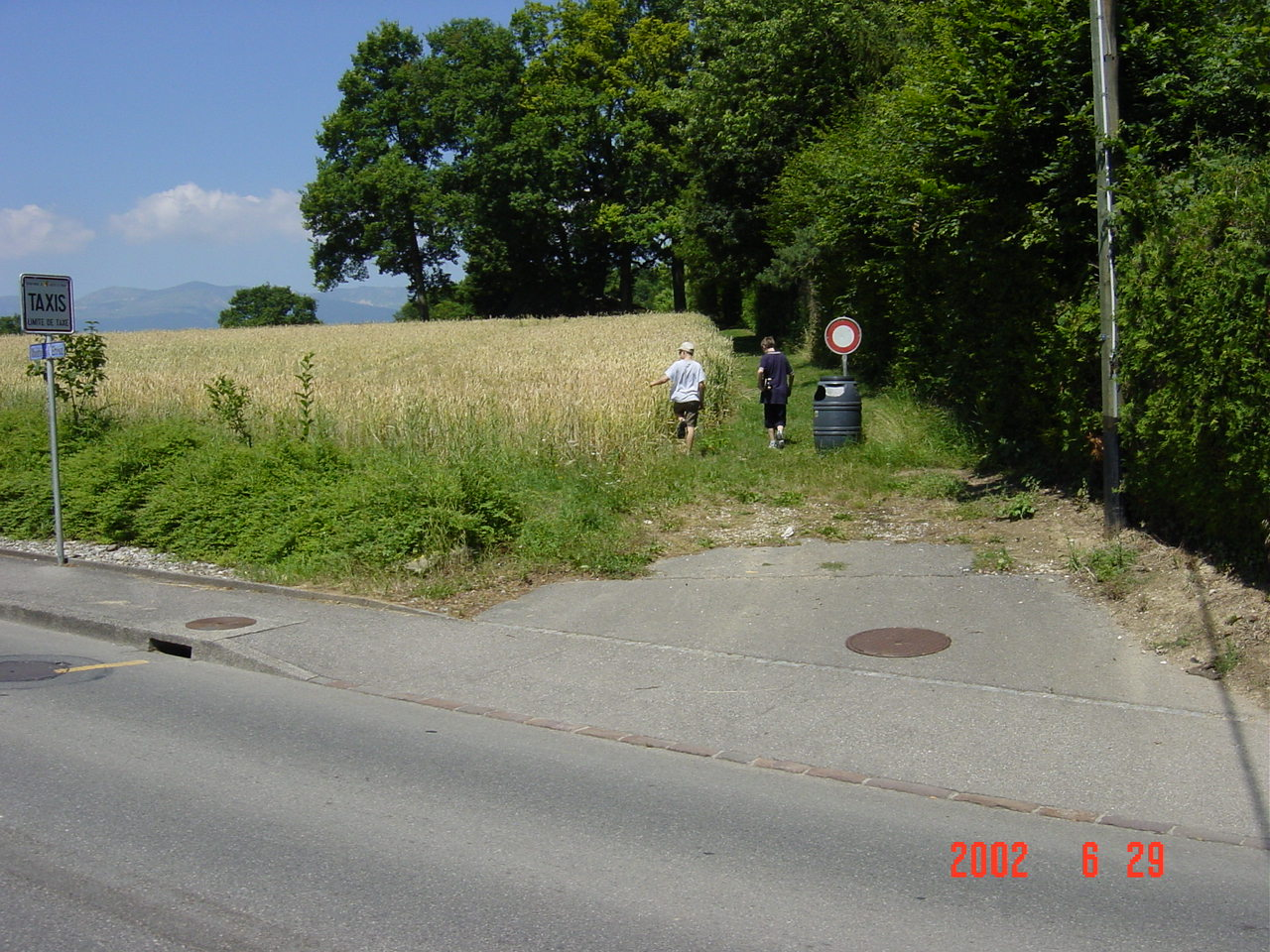
Cornfield

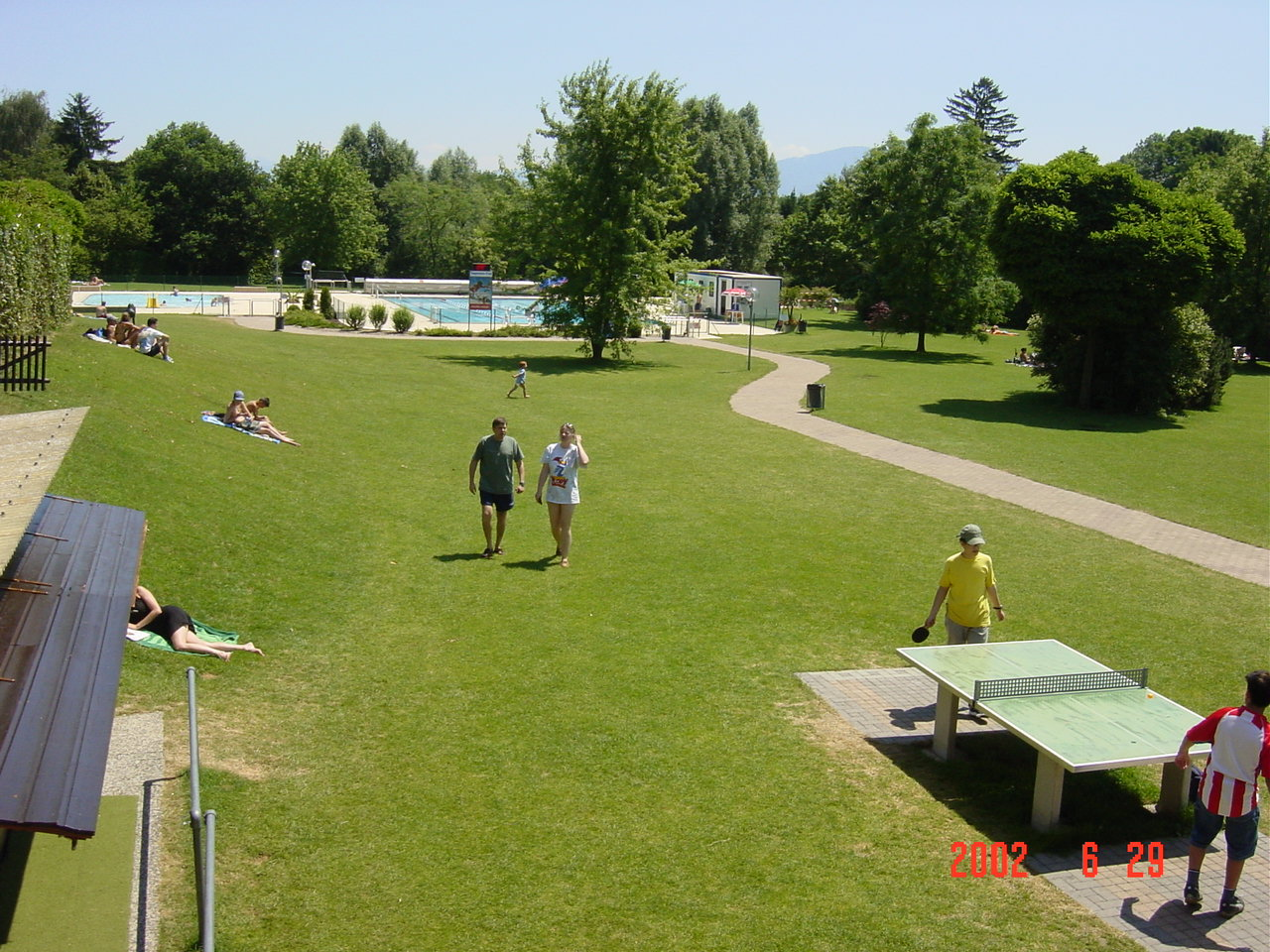
Versoix: Sports centre

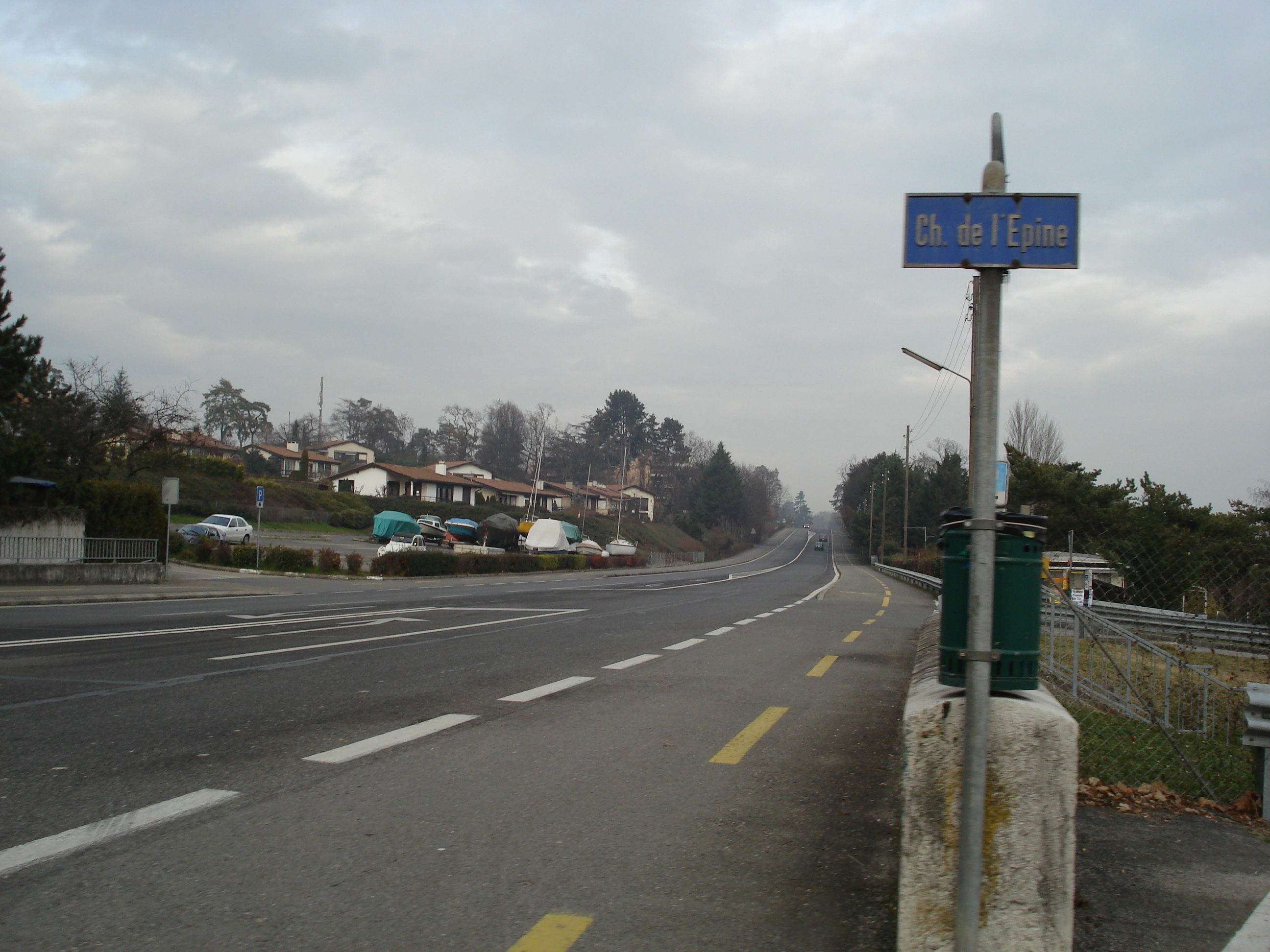
Route Suisse, Mies

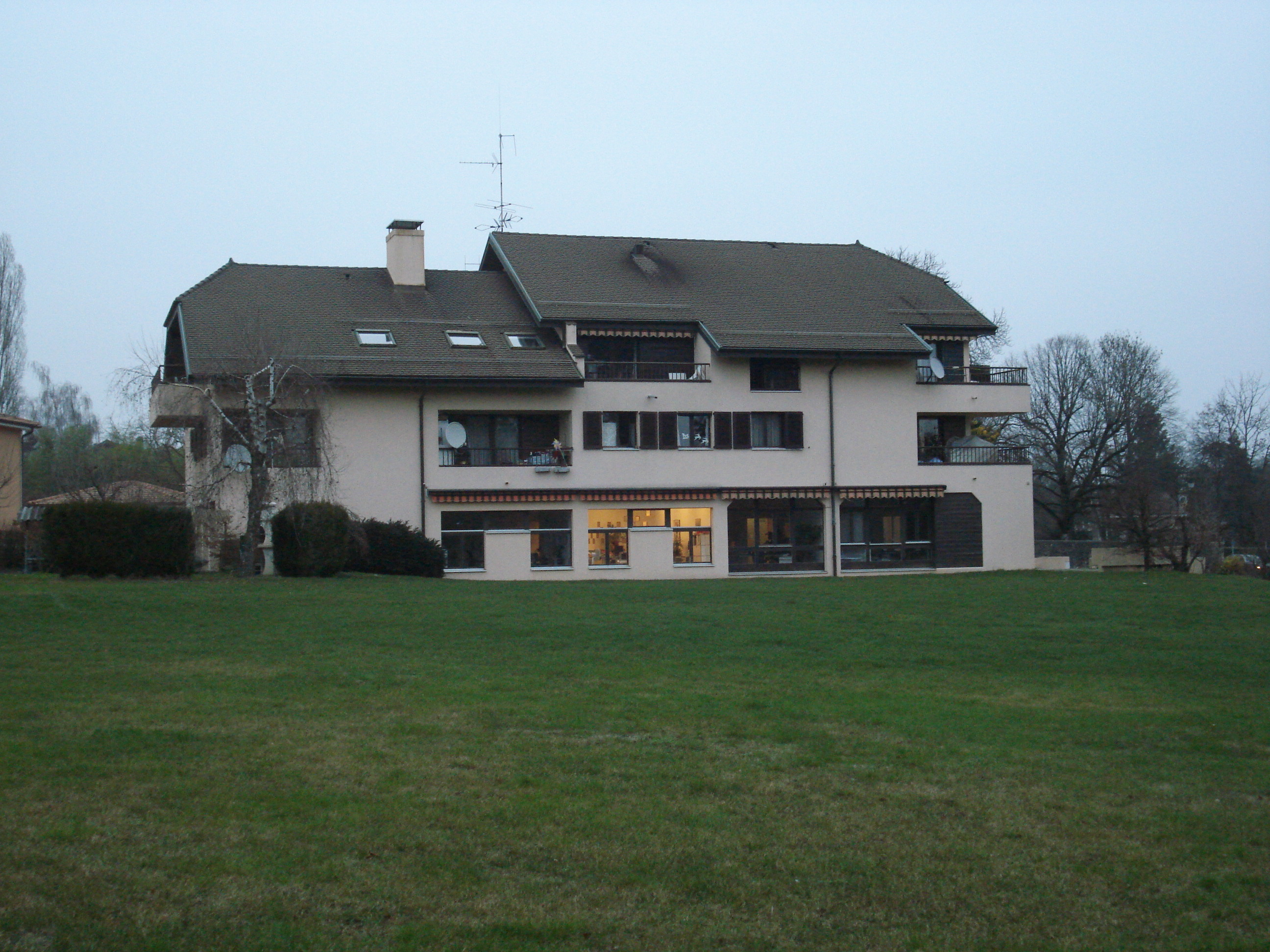
Centre médico-social

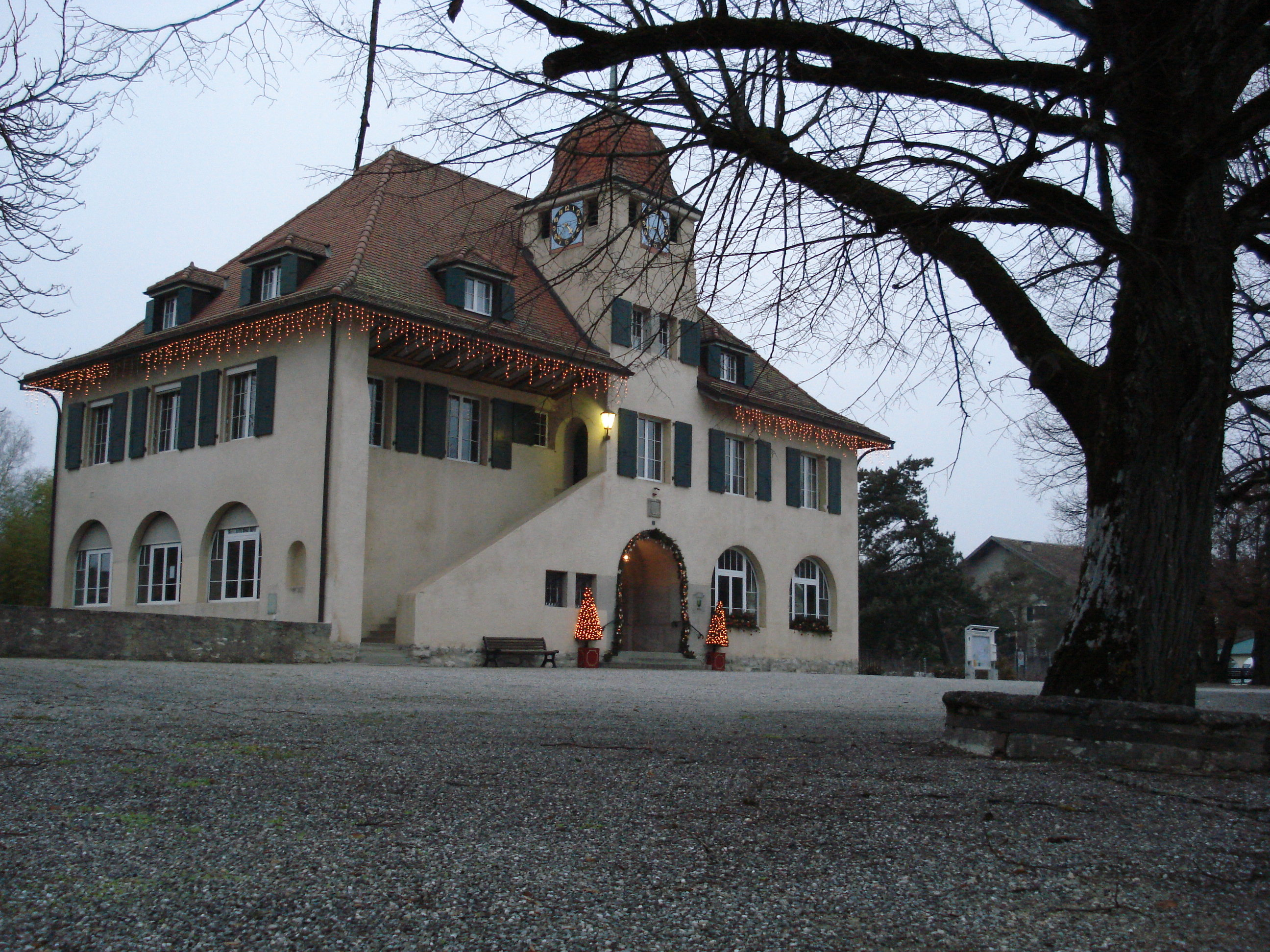
Administration Communale

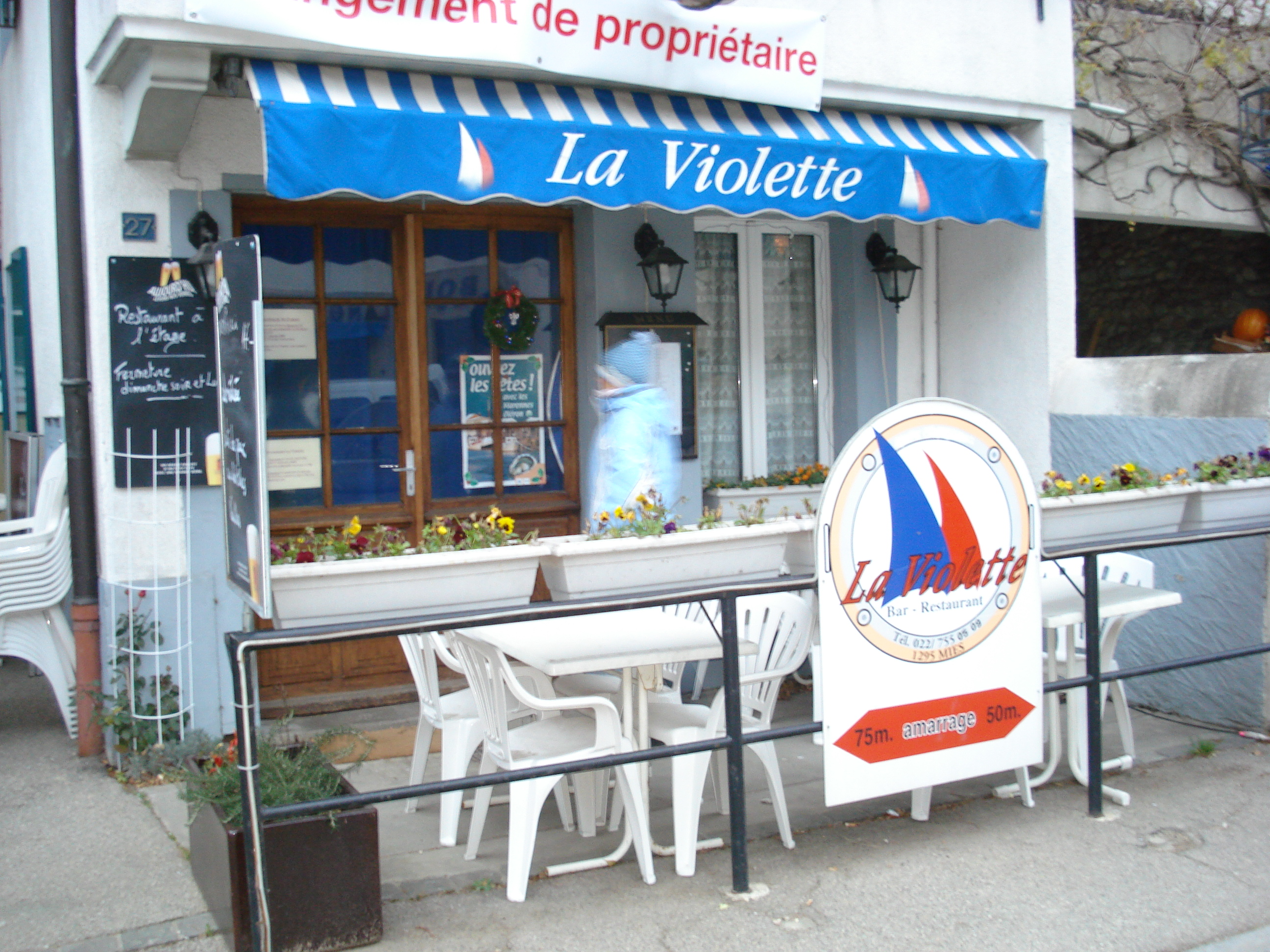
La Violette, Mies

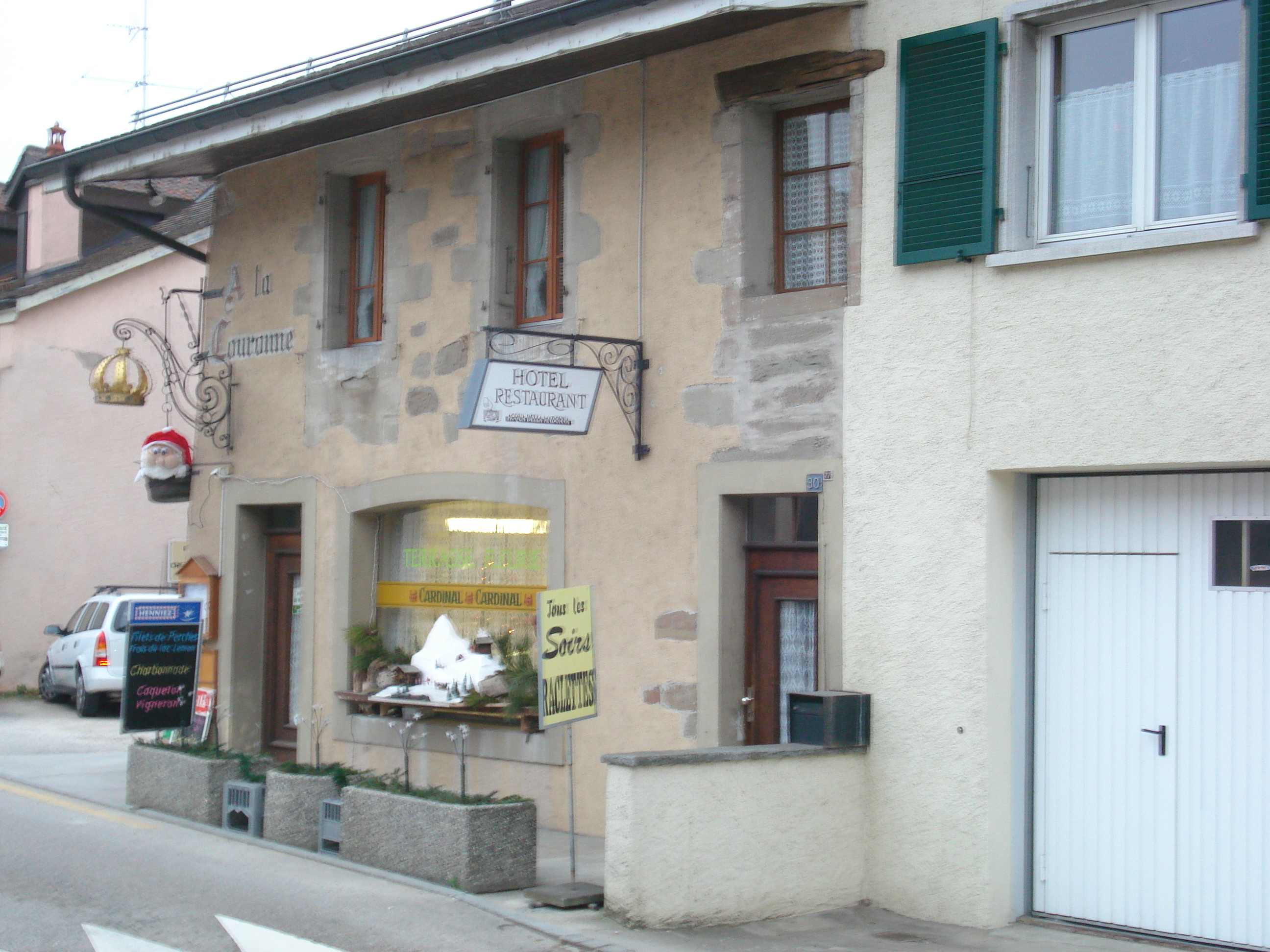
La Couronne

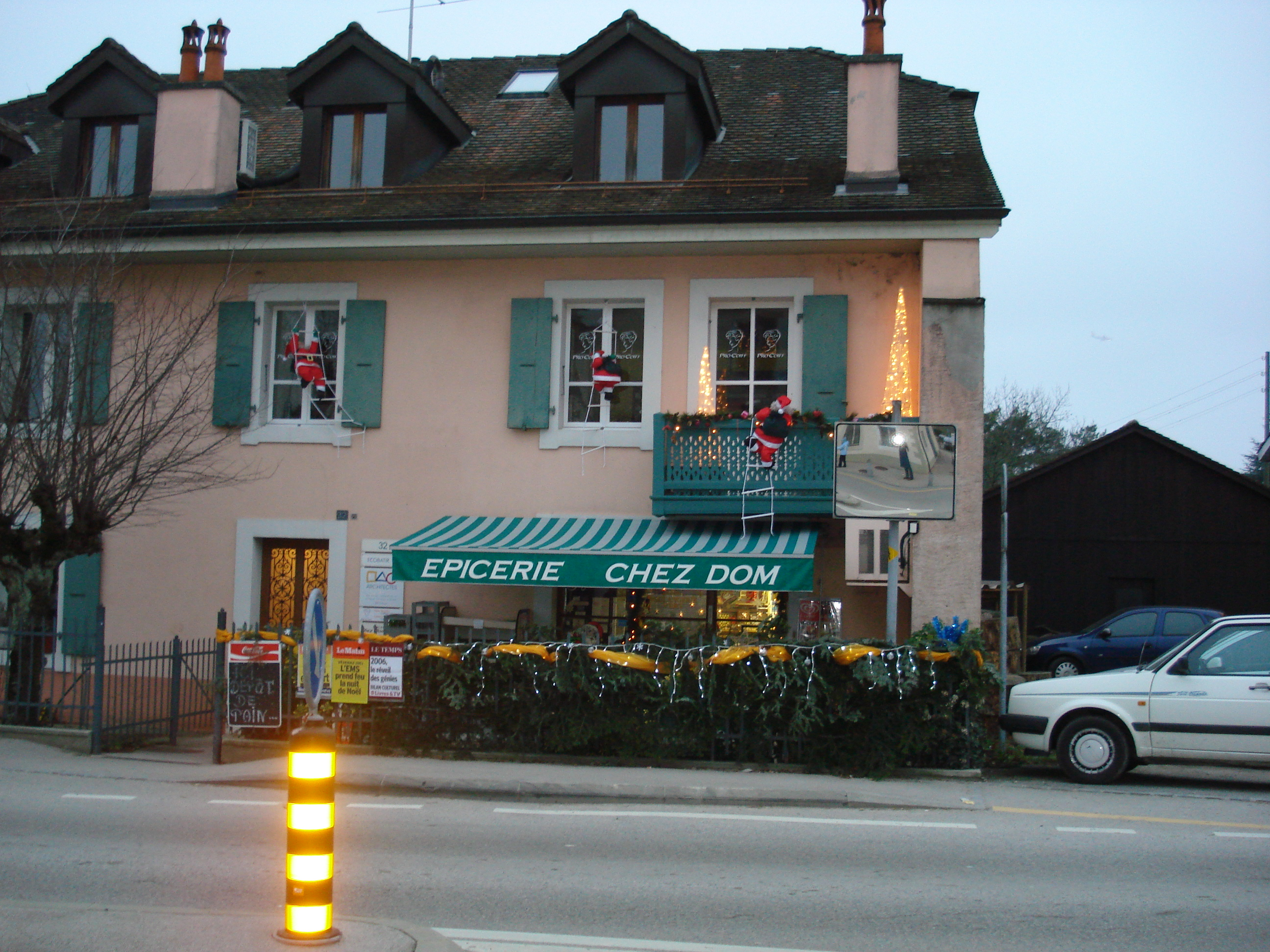
Chez Dominique

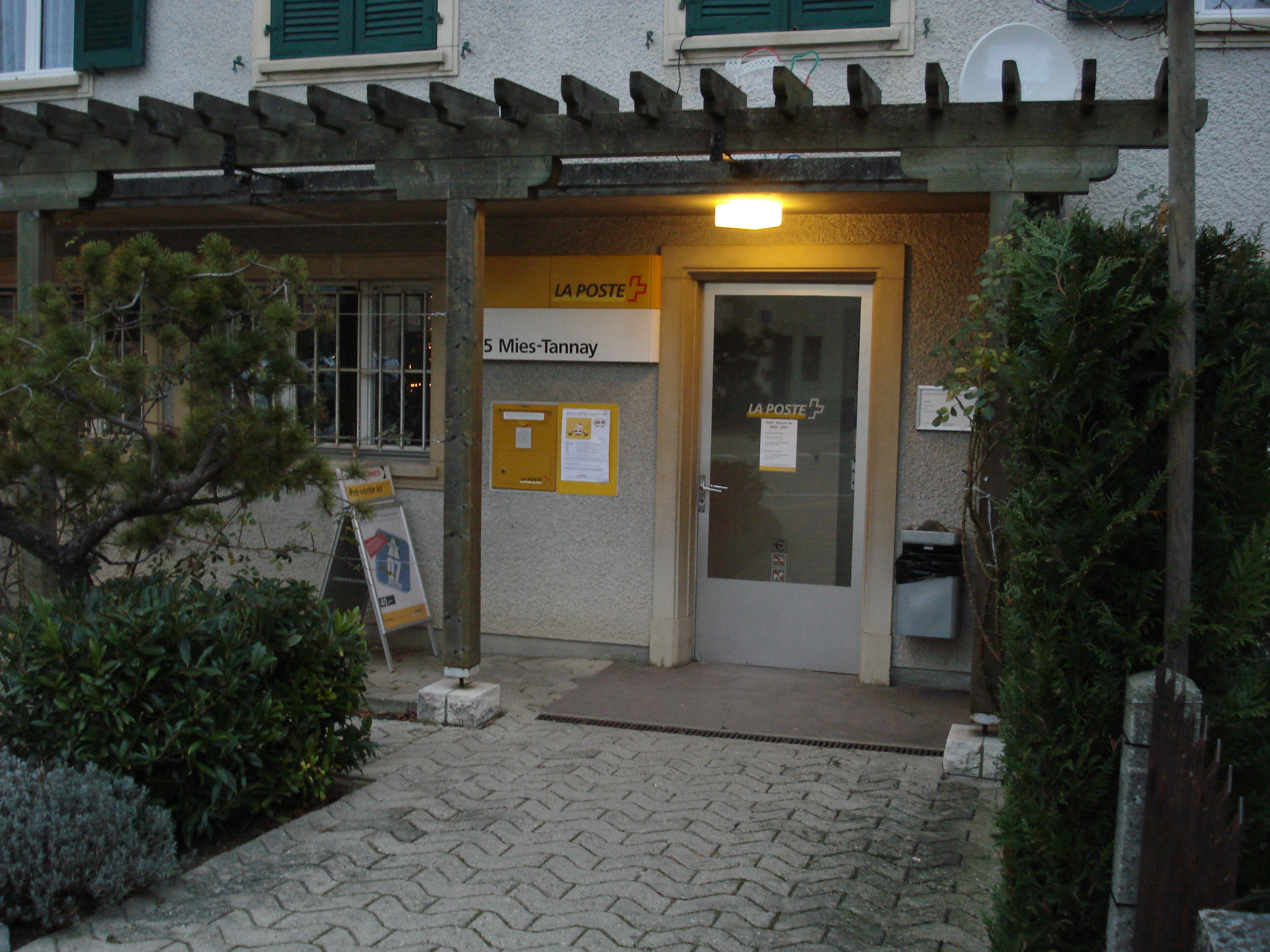
La Poste, Mies

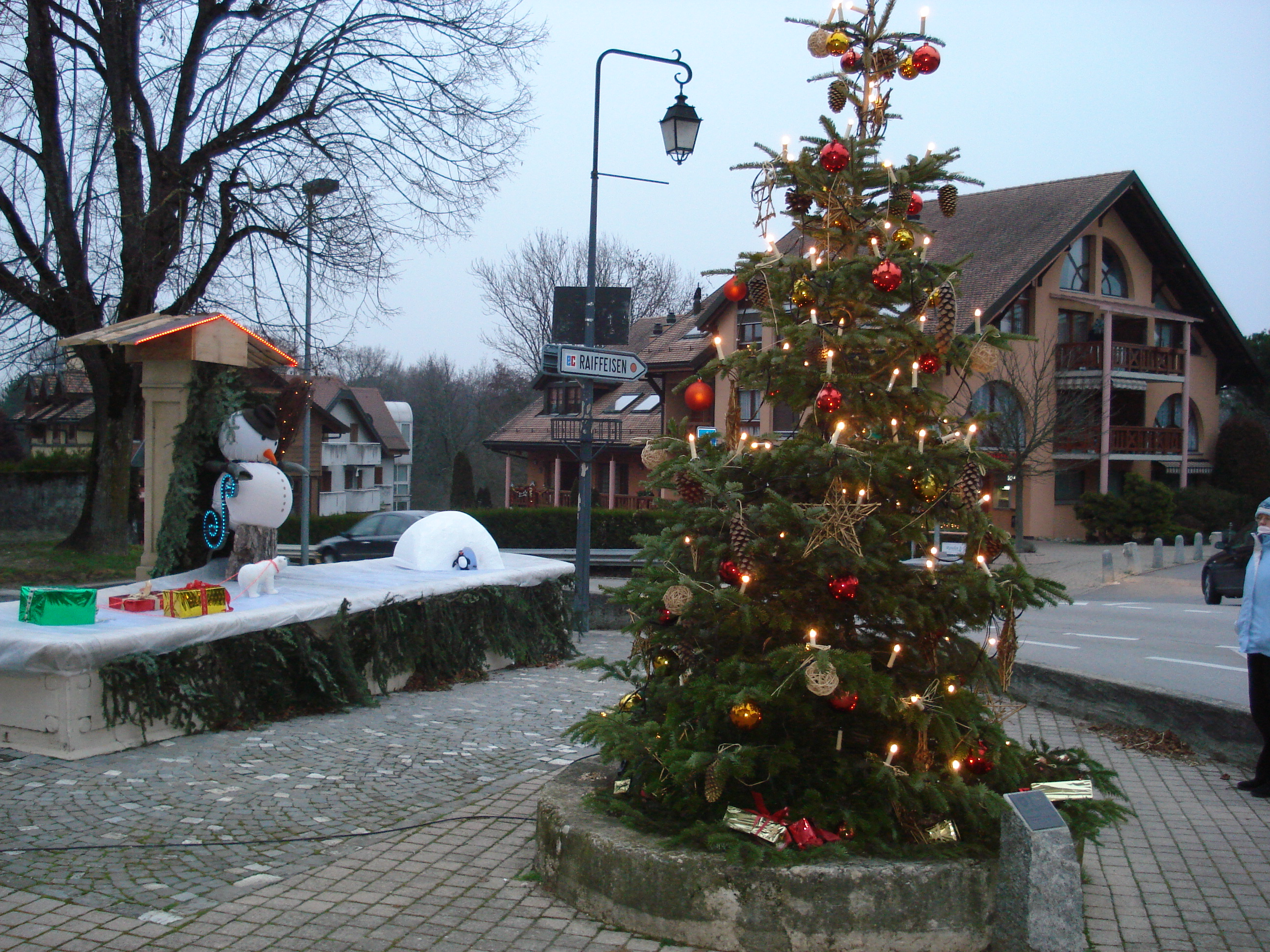
Christmas in Mies

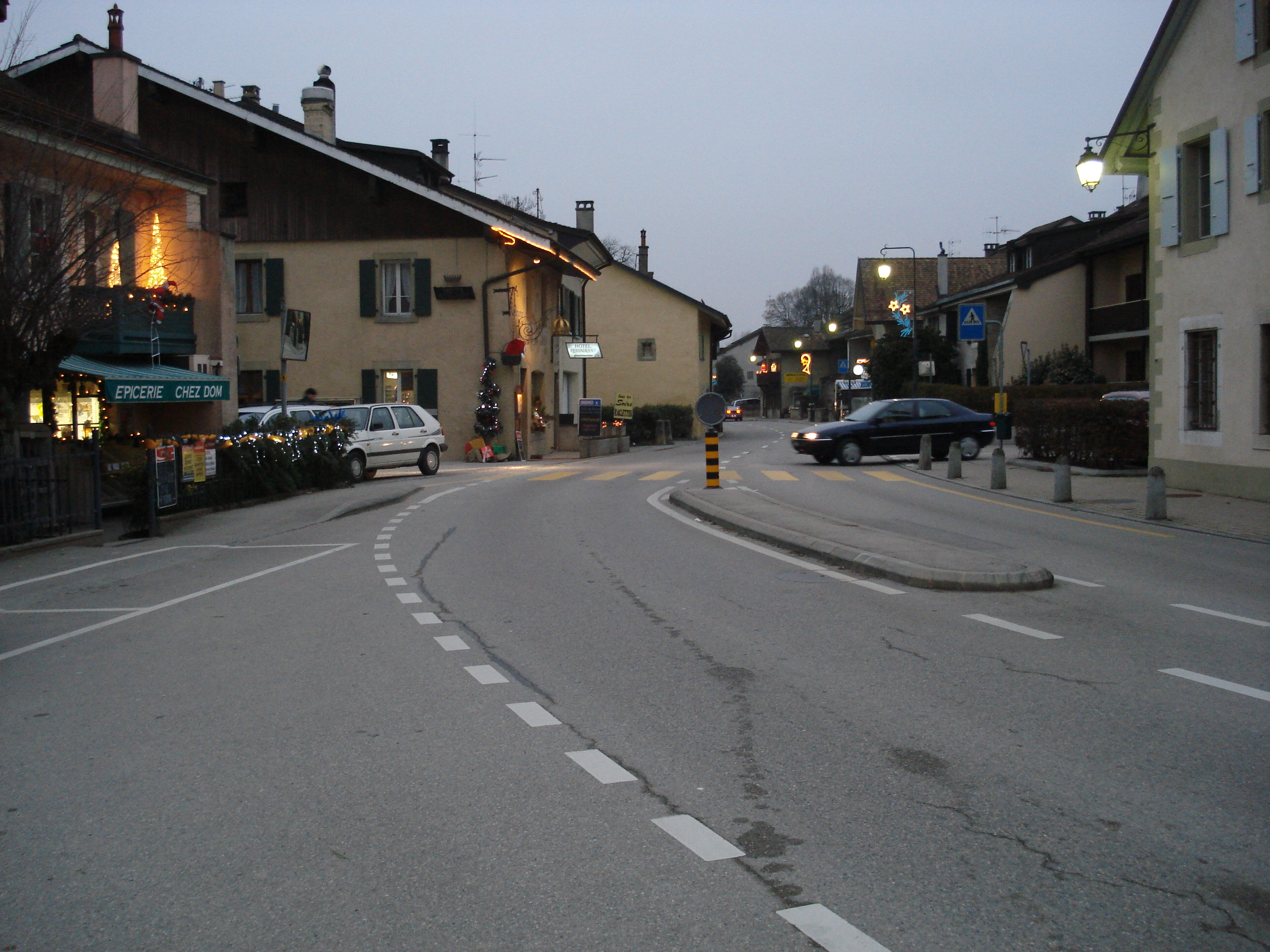
Mies village
