= Tannay, Switzerland =

Tannay
- Municipality
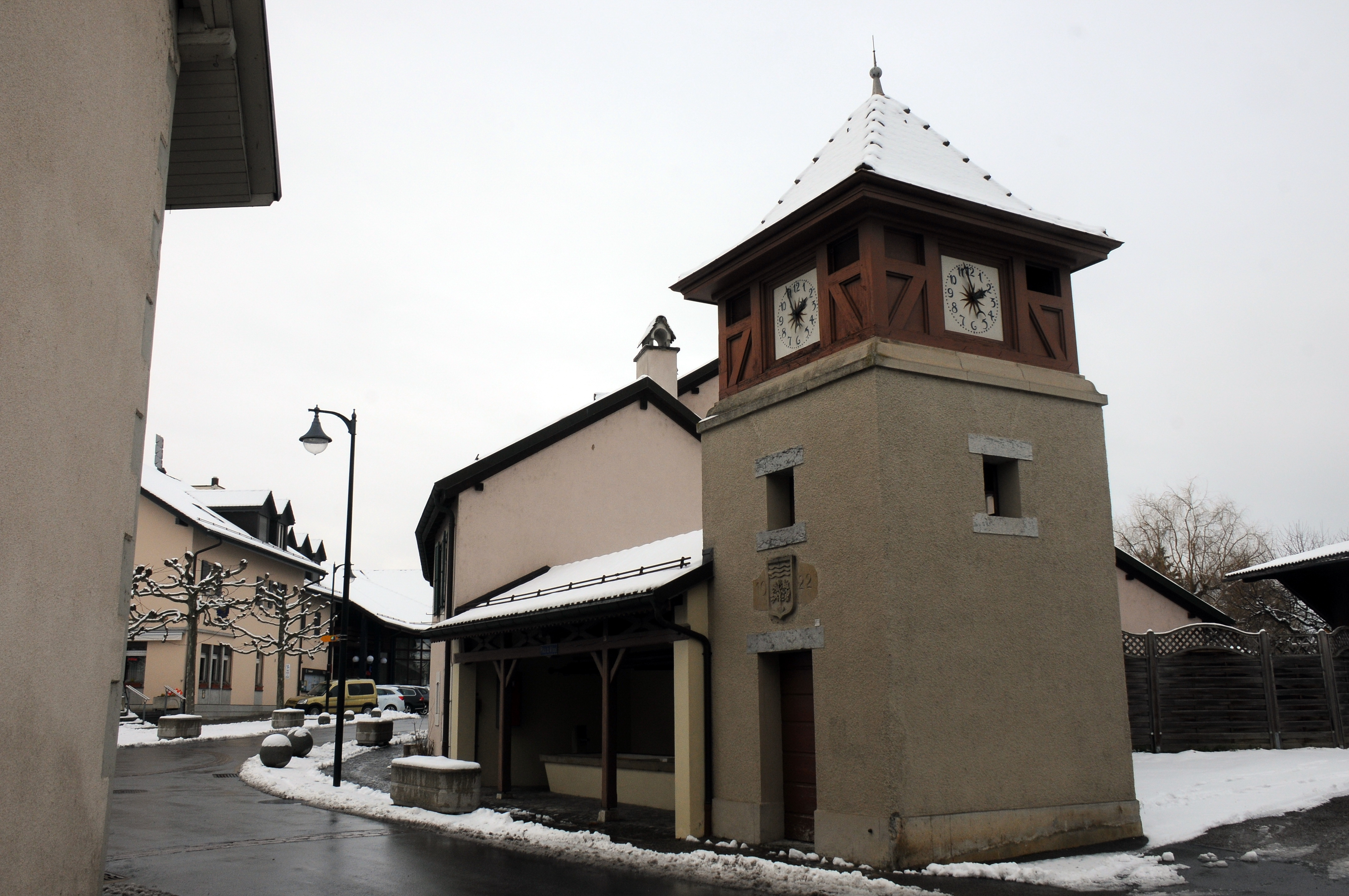
- Clock Tower in Tannay

- Flag Coat of arms
- Location of Tannay
- Location within Switzerland Location within Canton of Vaud
- Coordinates: 46°18′N 6°11′E
- Country: Switzerland
- Canton: Vaud
- District: Nyon

Government
  - Mayor: Syndic

Area
  - Total: 1.80 km^{2} (0.69 sq mi)
- Elevation: 407 m (1,335 ft)

Population (2003)
  - Total: 1,174
  - Density: 652/km^{2} (1,690/sq mi)
- Time zone: UTC+01:00 (CET)
  - Summer (DST): UTC+02:00 (CEST)
- Postal code: 1295
- SFOS number: 5729
- ISO 3166 code: CH-VD
- Surrounded by: Mies, Chavannes-des-Bois, Commugny, Coppet
- Website: www.tannay.ch

Tannay (French pronunciation: [tanɛ]) is a municipality in the district of Nyon in the canton of Vaud in Switzerland.

== History ==
Tannay may have been founded before the town of Coppet, which was first mentioned in 1294. However, it is first mentioned in 1390 as Taney. During the Middle Ages, it was part of the barony of Coppet. In 1536 the region became part of the Canton of Bern and the village was part of the Vogtei of Nyon, with the Baron of Coppet retaining power over the villages surrounding Coppet. Tannay Castle was built in 1649. In the 17th century, French Huguenots from the Pays de Gex region fled to Tannay to escape persecution. The descendants of one of these refugees, Jean Delor, founded a successful watch factory in the 19th century. In 1858 a rail station on the Geneva-Lausanne line opened in Tannay. However, until about 1950, it was primarily a rural, farming village. By the beginning of the 21st century, it had transformed into a bedroom community of Geneva.

== Geography ==
Aerial view of neighboring Coppet from 500 m by Walter Mittelholzer (1930).

Tannay has an area, (as of the 2004/09 survey) of 1.81 km^{2} (0.70 sq mi). Of this area, about 47.0% is used for agricultural purposes, while 13.8% is forested. Of the rest of the land, 39.2% is settled (buildings or roads). In the 2013/18 survey a total of 56 ha (140 acres) or about 31.5% of the total area was covered with buildings, an increase of 26 ha (64 acres) over the 1980 amount. Recreational space makes up about 0.56% of the total area.

Of the agricultural land, 13 ha (32 acres) is used for orchards and vineyards and 67 ha (170 acres) is fields and grasslands. Since 1980 the amount of agricultural land has decreased by 25 ha (62 acres). Over the same time period the amount of forested land has decreased by 1 ha (2.5 acres). Rivers and lakes cover 1 ha (2.5 acres) in the municipality.

The municipality was part of the old Nyon District until it was dissolved on 31 August 2006, and Tannay became part of the new district of Nyon.

The municipality is located on a terrace overlooking Lake Geneva, between Geneva-Saint-Cergue and Geneva-Lausanne roads.

== Coat of arms ==
The blazon of the municipal coat of arms is Per fess: 1. Azure, three Bars wavy Argent; 2. Argent, an Oak Tree Vert fructed Or issuant from a Coupeaux Sable.

== Demographics ==
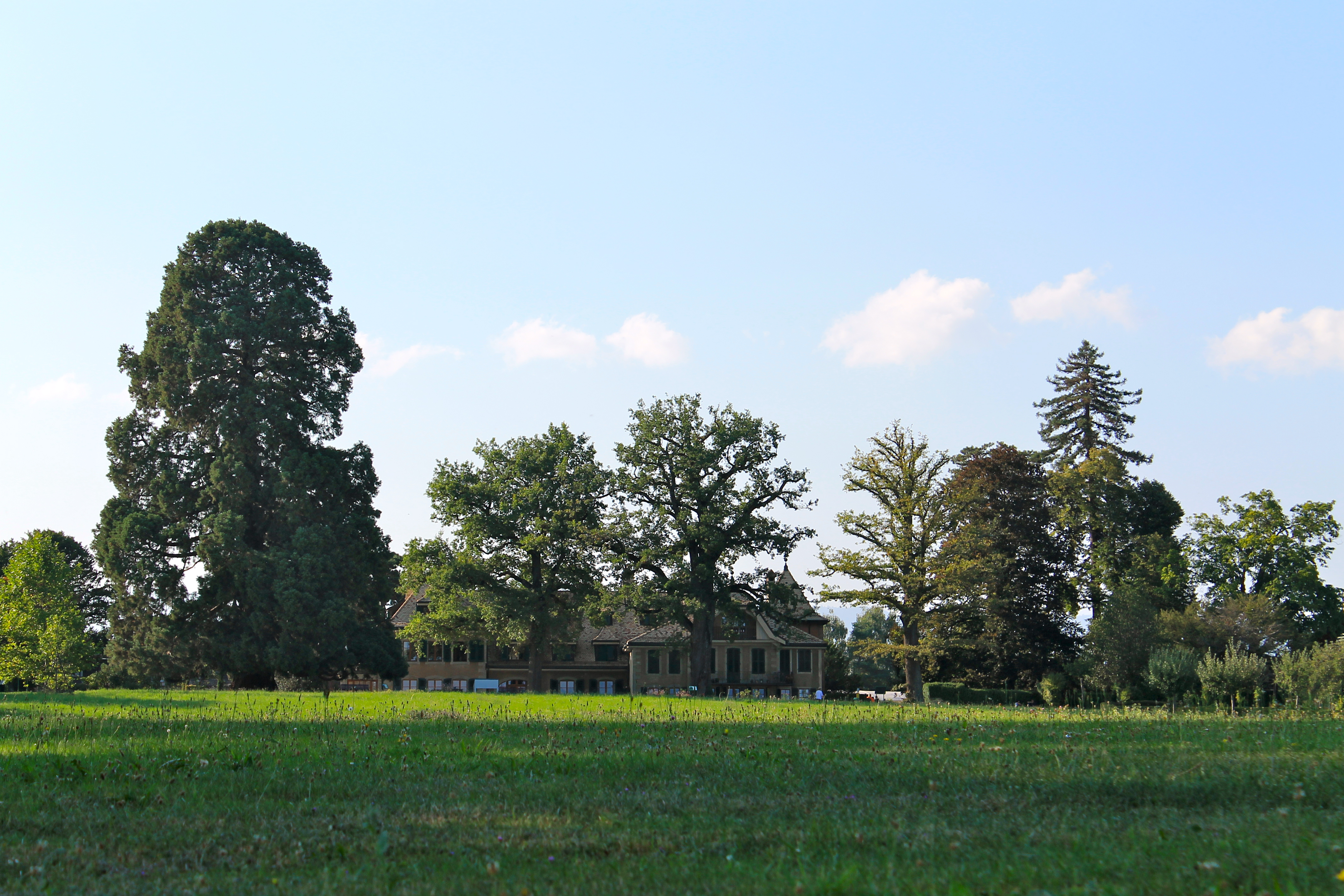
Tannay Chateau

Tannay has a population (as of 31 December 2020) of 1,641. As of 2017, 38.3% of the population are resident foreign nationals. In 2015 a small minority (105 or 6.6% of the population) was born in the United Kingdom. Over the last 7 years (2010-2017) the population has changed at a rate of 4.38%. The birth rate in the municipality, in 2017, was 3.8, while the death rate was 5.7 per thousand residents.

As of 2017, children and teenagers (0–19 years old) make up 27.3% of the population, while adults (20–64 years old) are 55.6% of the population and seniors (over 64 years old) make up 17.1%. In 2015 there were 682 single residents, 788 people who were married or in a civil partnership, 43 widows or widowers and 83 divorced residents.

In 2017 there were 562 private households in Tannay with an average household size of 2.82 persons. In 2015 about 87.3% of all buildings in the municipality were single family homes, which is much greater than the percentage in the canton (55.9%) and much greater than the percentage nationally (57.4%). Of the 369 inhabited buildings in the municipality, in 2000, about 83.2% were single family homes and 12.5% were multiple family buildings. Additionally, about 6.8% of the buildings were built before 1919, while 10.6% were built between 1991 and 2000. In 2016 the rate of construction of new housing units per 1000 residents was 0.63. The vacancy rate for the municipality, in 2018, was 2.23%.

Tannay has a population (as of December 2020) of 1,641. As of 2008, 37.5% of the population are resident foreign nationals. Over the last 10 years (1999–2009 ) the population has changed at a rate of 22.5%. It has changed at a rate of 18.4% due to migration and at a rate of 4.8% due to births and deaths.

Most of the population (as of 2000) speaks French (867 or 70.7%), with German being second most common (123 or 10.0%) and English being third (112 or 9.1%). There are 25 people who speak Italian.

The historical population is given in the following chart:

== Politics ==
In the 2015 federal election the most popular party was the FDP with 38.7% of the vote. The next three most popular parties were the SVP (20.4%), the SP (10.2%) and the Green Party (8.0%). In the federal election, a total of 390 votes were cast, and the voter turnout was 50.2%. The 2015 election saw a large change in the voting when compared to 2011. The percentage of the vote received by the FDP increased sharply from 20.3% in 2011 to 38.7% in 2015

In the 2007 federal election the most popular party was the LPS Party which received 19.04% of the vote. The next three most popular parties were the SVP (18.96%), the FDP (17.27%) and the Green Party (13.04%). In the federal election, a total of 377 votes were cast, and the voter turnout was 53.0%.

== Economy ==
Tannay is classed as a high-income community. The municipality is part of the agglomeration of Geneva.

As of 2016, there were a total of 159 people employed in the municipality. Of these, a total of 9 people worked in 9 businesses in the primary economic sector. The secondary sector employed 25 workers in 10 separate businesses. Finally, the tertiary sector provided 125 jobs in 73 businesses.

In 2017 a total of 0.6% of the population received social assistance. In 2011 the unemployment rate in the municipality was 2.6%.

In 2015 the average cantonal, municipal and church tax rate in the municipality for a couple with two children making SFr 80,000 was 4.5% while the rate for a single person making SFr 150,000 was 17.4%. The canton has an average tax rate for those making SFr 80,000 and a slightly higher than average rate for those making SFr 150,000. In 2013 the average income in the municipality per tax payer was SFr 183,604 and the per person average was SFr 67,167, which is greater than the cantonal averages of SFr 90,895 and SFr 35,879 respectively It is also greater than the national per tax payer average of SFr 82,682 and the per person average of SFr 35,825.

In 2008 the total number of full-time equivalent jobs was 95. The number of jobs in the primary sector was 6, all of which were in agriculture. The number of jobs in the secondary sector was 13 of which 12 or (92.3%) were in manufacturing and 1 was in construction. The number of jobs in the tertiary sector was 76. In the tertiary sector; 19 or 25.0% were in wholesale or retail sales or the repair of motor vehicles, 22 or 28.9% were in a hotel or restaurant, 2 or 2.6% were in the information industry, 2 or 2.6% were the insurance or financial industry, 14 or 18.4% were technical professionals or scientists, 4 or 5.3% were in education and 3 or 3.9% were in health care.

In 2000, there were 60 workers who commuted into the municipality and 548 workers who commuted away. The municipality is a net exporter of workers, with about 9.1 workers leaving the municipality for every one entering. About 15.0% of the workforce coming into Tannay are coming from outside Switzerland, while 0.4% of the locals commute out of Switzerland for work. Of the working population, 16.2% used public transportation to get to work, and 71.6% used a private car.

== Religion ==
From the 2000 census, 382 or 31.1% were Roman Catholic, while 367 or 29.9% belonged to the Swiss Reformed Church. Of the rest of the population, there were 17 members of an Orthodox church (or about 1.39% of the population), there were 3 individuals (or about 0.24% of the population) who belonged to the Christian Catholic Church, and there were 33 individuals (or about 2.69% of the population) who belonged to another Christian church. There were 12 individuals (or about 0.98% of the population) who were Jewish, and 28 (or about 2.28% of the population) who were Islamic. There were 5 individuals who were Buddhist, 5 individuals who were Hindu and 1 individual who belonged to another church. 253 (or about 20.62% of the population) belonged to no church, are agnostic or atheist, and 135 individuals (or about 11.00% of the population) did not answer the question.

== Education ==
In Tannay about 344 or (28.0%) of the population have completed non-mandatory upper secondary education, and 371 or (30.2%) have completed additional higher education (either university or a Fachhochschule). Of the 371 who completed tertiary schooling, 35.6% were Swiss men, 23.7% were Swiss women, 22.4% were non-Swiss men and 18.3% were non-Swiss women.

In the 2009/2010 school year there were a total of 132 students in the Tannay school district. In the Vaud cantonal school system, two years of non-obligatory pre-school are provided by the political districts. During the school year, the political district provided pre-school care for a total of 1,249 children of which 563 children (45.1%) received subsidized pre-school care. The canton's primary school program requires students to attend for four years. There were 68 students in the municipal primary school program. The obligatory lower secondary school program lasts for six years and there were 64 students in those schools.

As of 2000, there were 11 students in Tannay who came from another municipality, while 230 residents attended schools outside the municipality.
