= Lac de Sylans =

Lake in Ain, France

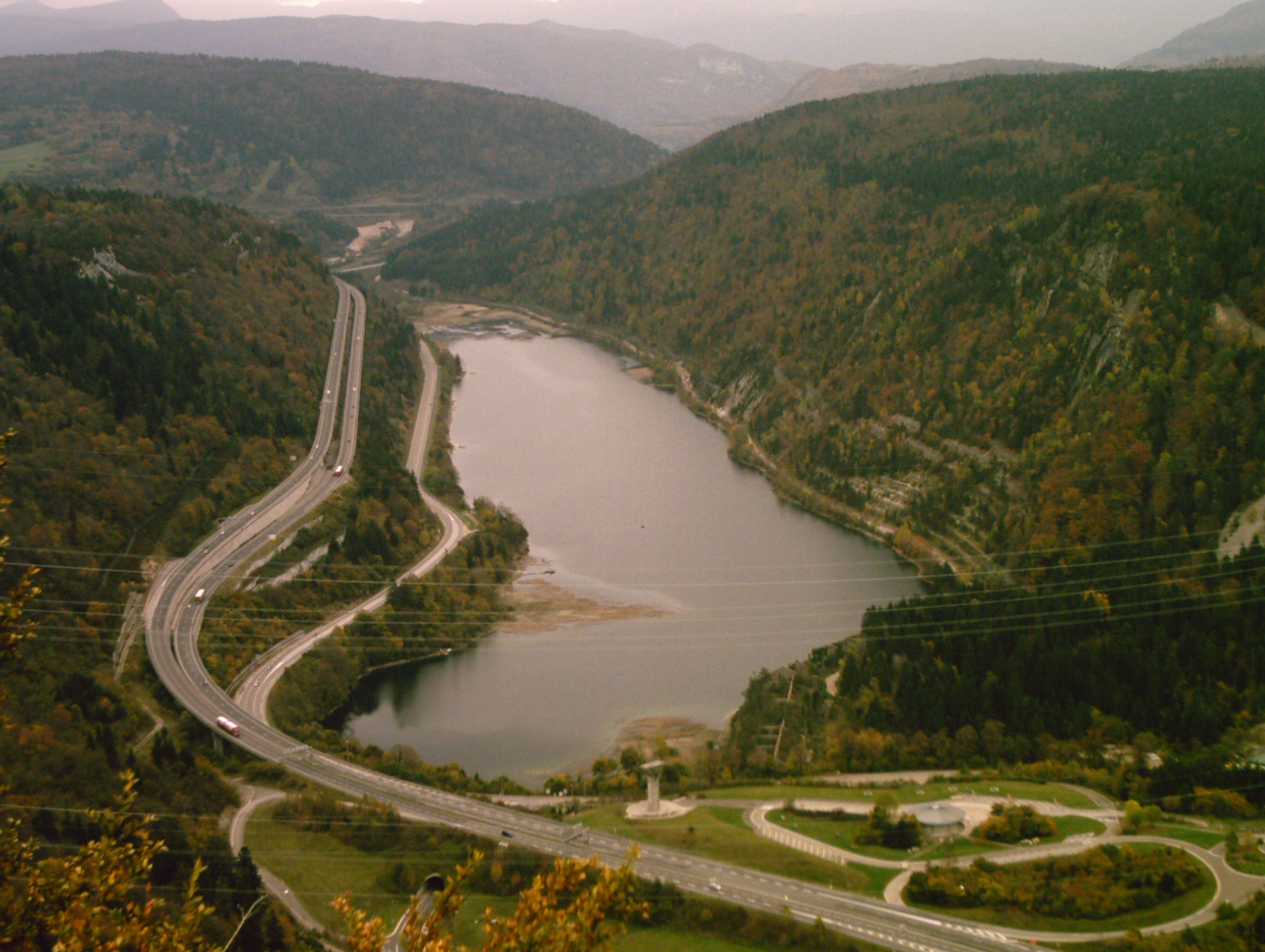

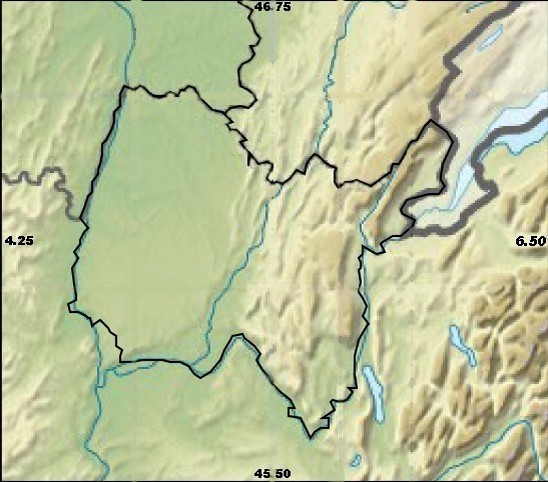
- Location within Ain
- Location: Ain
- Coordinates: 46°9′40″N 5°39′50″E
- Primary outflows: Doye
- Basin countries: France
- Surface elevation: 584 m (1,916 ft)

Lac de Sylans is a lake at Le Poizat in the Ain department, France.

It is significant for the ruins of one of the 19th century's largest ice harvesting factories and the occasional outflow of water in two directions.

== Geography ==
The lac de Sylans fills part of the Nantua water gap, which was formed during the last glacial era. The formation of the lake itself is much more recent; it is the result of the collapse of the cliff on the Northern side of the valley a few centuries ago. This huge landslide partially blocked the valley between the ice factory and the source of the Doye, above les Neyrolles, blocking the river that was flowing along what is now the bed of the lake, causing the lake to form. Today the water percolates through the landslide debris to form the source of the Doye.

In dry summers the level of the lake can fall by 5m, whereas during wet periods, the level can rise to a point where the water also flows out towards Saint-Germain-de-Joux and Bellegarde-sur-Valserine, at the other end of the water gap, via the Combet stream, which flows into the Semine then the Valserine, which flows into the Rhône.

== History ==
=== Ice Harvesting Factory ===
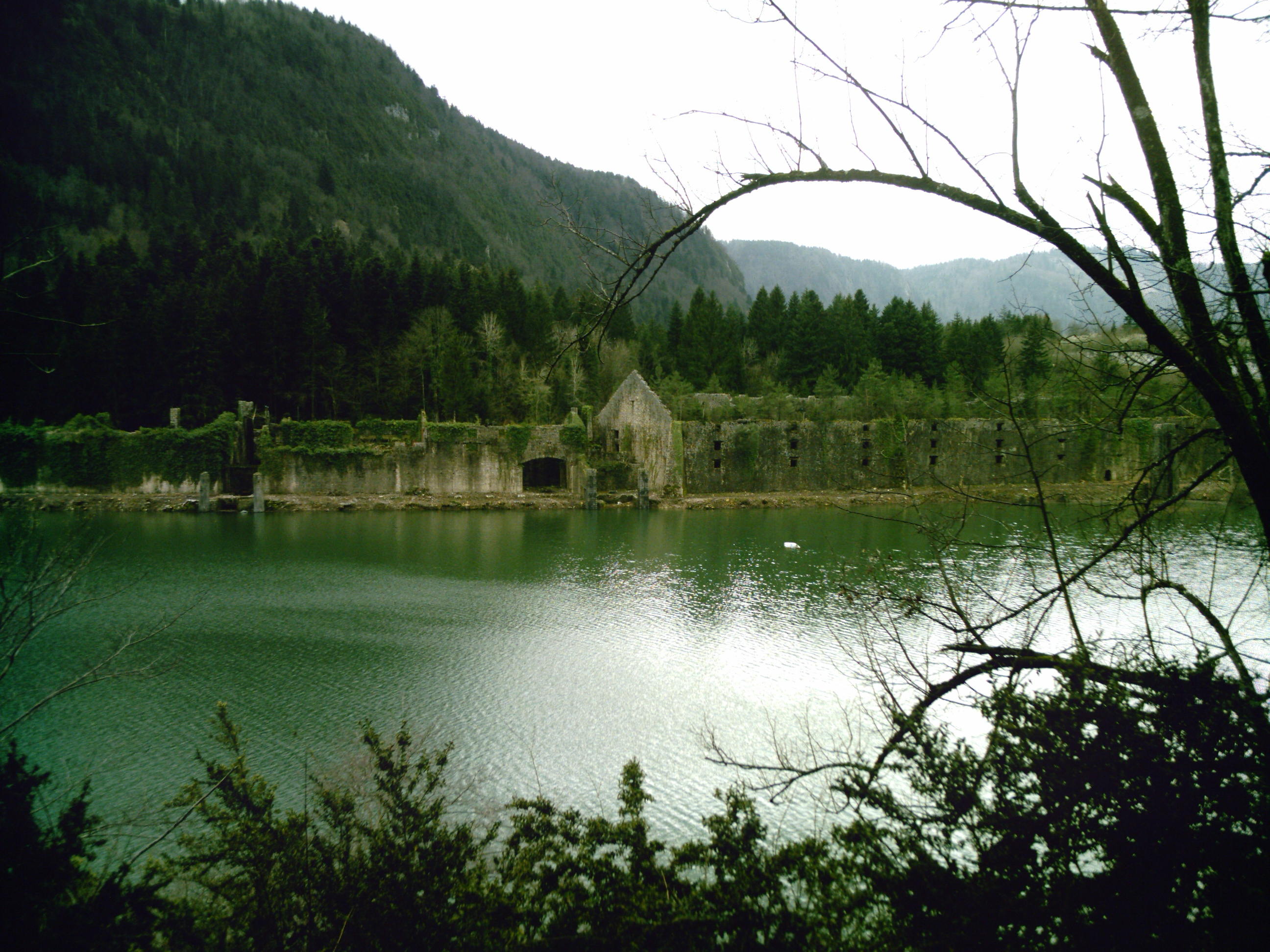
Former lac de Sylans ice factory

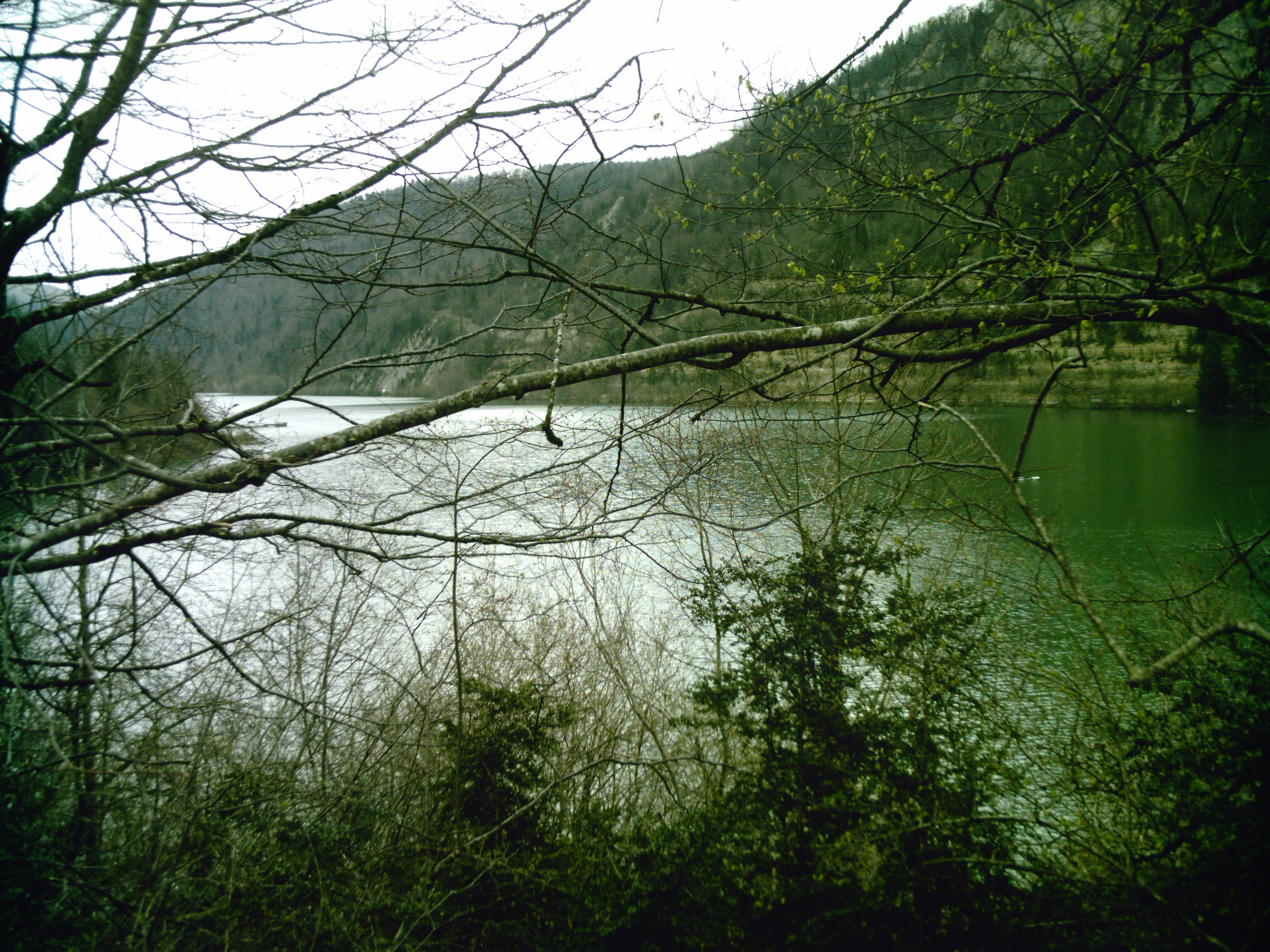
Lac de Sylans

The ice factory was built in 1865 after Joachim Moinat had the idea to use the very pure ice that covered the lake every year in his café. This purity meant the ice could be used as is without purification. To store the ice, he built a wooden hut. In 1875, a second building was erected. This one was equipped with cavity walls in which the cavity was filled with sawdust for better thermal insulation.

In 1885, he sold the business to the société des glacières de Paris. There followed, between 1890 and 1910, the construction of further buildings in wood then in stone. These building served as dwellings offices, a canteen, a stable and a repair workshop.

Later when the Haut-Bugey railway line was opened, 20 to 30 wagons loaded with 10 tonnes each departed every day of the summer for Paris, Lyon, Marseille, Toulon and even Alger. These loads were covered with a jute mat, straw and a tarpaulin for insulation. Losses were reasonable, as for 10 tonnes shipped, about 8 arrived in Paris.

By 1880, the factory was producing 300,000 tons per year on average. Machines able to make ice from water appeared around 1900. The warmer winters of 1911 to 1913 and the First World War saw an end to production in 1917.

Today, only a few traces remain of what was one of the largest ice factories of the 19th century. Some restoration has taken place, revealing how the warehouses might have been.

=== Transport Infrastructure ===
Running on each side of the lake are two important transport arteries. On the south side the Haut-Bugey railway line, initially a regional line from Bourg en Bresse to Bellegarde, but rebuilt in 2010 to carry TGVs from Geneva to Paris

On the northern side the A40 autoroute connecting Switzerland and Northern Italy (via the Mont Blanc tunnel) to France.
