= Le Poizat-Lalleyriat =

Commune in Auvergne-Rhône-Alpes, France

- Commune
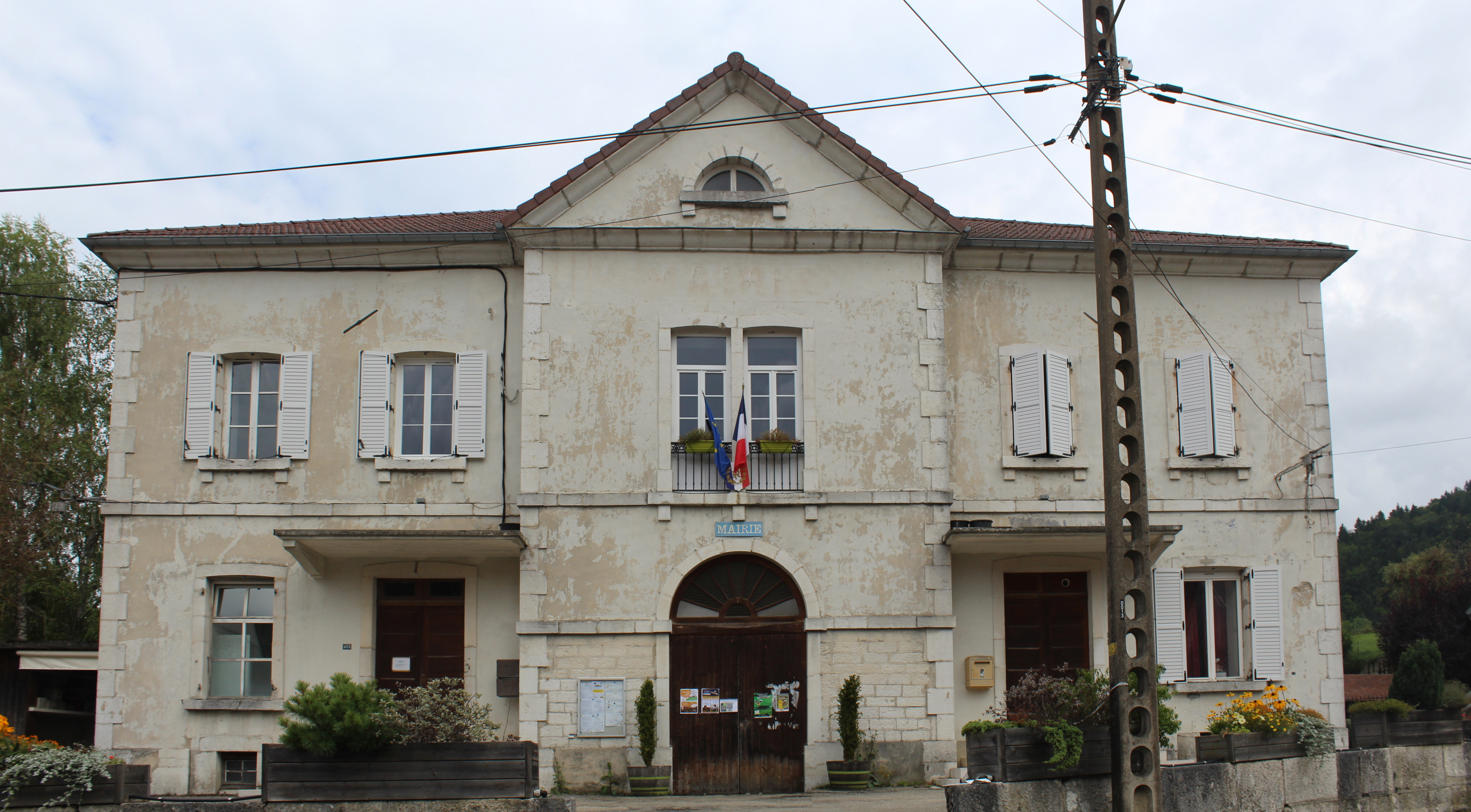
- Town hall
- Location of Le Poizat-Lalleyriat
- Location within France Location within Auvergne-Rhône-Alpes
- Coordinates: 46°08′42″N 5°41′46″E
- Country: France
- Region: Auvergne-Rhône-Alpes
- Department: Ain
- Arrondissement: Nantua
- Canton: Nantua
- Intercommunality: Haut-Bugey Agglomération

Government
  - Mayor (2026–32): Samuel Becot
- Area^{1}: 33.15 km^{2} (12.80 sq mi)
- Population (2023): 732
  - Density: 22.1/km^{2} (57.2/sq mi)
- Time zone: UTC+01:00 (CET)
  - Summer (DST): UTC+02:00 (CEST)
- INSEE/Postal code: 01204 /01130
- ^{1} French Land Register data, which excludes lakes, ponds, glaciers > 1 km^{2} (0.386 sq mi or 247 acres) and river estuaries.

Le Poizat-Lalleyriat (French pronunciation: [lə pwaza lalɛʁja]) is a commune in the Ain department of eastern France. The municipality was established on 1 January 2016 and consists of the former communes of Lalleyriat and Le Poizat.

== Geography ==
=== Climate ===
Le Poizat-Lalleyriat has an oceanic climate (Köppen climate classification Cfb). The average annual temperature in Le Poizat-Lalleyriat is 8.3 °C (46.9 °F). The average annual rainfall is 1,752.5 mm (69.00 in) with December as the wettest month. The temperatures are highest on average in July, at around 17.6 °C (63.7 °F), and lowest in January, at around 0.0 °C (32.0 °F). The highest temperature ever recorded in Le Poizat-Lalleyriat was 37.5 °C (99.5 °F) on 31 July 1983; the coldest temperature ever recorded was −22.5 °C (−8.5 °F) on 9 January 1985.

Climate data for Lalleyriat, Le Poizat-Lalleyriat (1981–2010 averages, extremes 1981−1997)
Month	Jan	Feb	Mar	Apr	May	Jun	Jul	Aug	Sep	Oct	Nov	Dec	Year
Record high °C (°F)	13.5 (56.3)	19.0 (66.2)	23.0 (73.4)	23.0 (73.4)	26.0 (78.8)	30.0 (86.0)	37.5 (99.5)	32.0 (89.6)	30.0 (86.0)	24.9 (76.8)	21.0 (69.8)	19.5 (67.1)	37.5 (99.5)
Mean daily maximum °C (°F)	2.9 (37.2)	4.2 (39.6)	7.9 (46.2)	11.0 (51.8)	15.8 (60.4)	19.3 (66.7)	23.2 (73.8)	22.6 (72.7)	18.0 (64.4)	12.9 (55.2)	7.0 (44.6)	3.7 (38.7)	12.4 (54.3)
Daily mean °C (°F)	0.0 (32.0)	0.8 (33.4)	4.0 (39.2)	6.6 (43.9)	11.0 (51.8)	14.4 (57.9)	17.6 (63.7)	17.2 (63.0)	13.3 (55.9)	9.2 (48.6)	3.8 (38.8)	0.9 (33.6)	8.3 (46.9)
Mean daily minimum °C (°F)	−3.0 (26.6)	−2.6 (27.3)	0.0 (32.0)	2.3 (36.1)	6.3 (43.3)	9.5 (49.1)	12.1 (53.8)	11.8 (53.2)	8.7 (47.7)	5.4 (41.7)	0.7 (33.3)	−1.8 (28.8)	4.2 (39.6)
Record low °C (°F)	−22.5 (−8.5)	−18.0 (−0.4)	−12.0 (10.4)	−8.0 (17.6)	−3.0 (26.6)	0.5 (32.9)	3.0 (37.4)	2.0 (35.6)	0.0 (32.0)	−6.0 (21.2)	−14.0 (6.8)	−14.5 (5.9)	−22.5 (−8.5)
Average precipitation mm (inches)	167.6 (6.60)	150.8 (5.94)	132.9 (5.23)	131.5 (5.18)	149.3 (5.88)	125.4 (4.94)	111.9 (4.41)	114.8 (4.52)	135.3 (5.33)	166.6 (6.56)	174.3 (6.86)	192.1 (7.56)	1,752.5 (69.00)
Average precipitation days (≥ 1.0 mm)	12.6	11.7	11.6	11.7	13.8	11.2	9.5	10.2	9.9	12.4	12.1	12.8	139.5
Source: Meteociel

== See also ==
- Communes of the Ain department
