= Le Poizat =

Commune in Ain, France

- Part of Le Poizat-Lalleyriat
- Location of Le Poizat
- Location within France Location within Auvergne-Rhône-Alpes
- Coordinates: 46°08′42″N 5°41′46″E
- Country: France
- Region: Auvergne-Rhône-Alpes
- Department: Ain
- Arrondissement: Nantua
- Canton: Nantua
- Commune: Le Poizat-Lalleyriat
- Area^{1}: 17.9 km^{2} (6.9 sq mi)
- Elevation: 950 m (3,120 ft)
- Highest elevation: 1,200 m (3,900 ft)
- Lowest elevation: 551 m (1,808 ft)
- Population (2022): 487
  - Density: 27.2/km^{2} (70.5/sq mi)
- Time zone: UTC+01:00 (CET)
  - Summer (DST): UTC+02:00 (CEST)
- Postal code: 01130
- ^{1} French Land Register data, which excludes lakes, ponds, glaciers > 1 km^{2} (0.386 sq mi or 247 acres) and river estuaries.

Le Poizat (French pronunciation: [lə pwaza]) is a former commune in the Ain department in eastern France. On 1 January 2016, it was merged into the new commune Le Poizat-Lalleyriat.

== Population ==
Historical population
Year	Pop.	±% p.a.
2006	403	—
2011	430	+1.31%
2022	487	+1.14%
Source: INSEE

== See also ==
- Communes of the Ain department
- Lac de Sylans
