= Lalleyriat =

Commune in Ain, France

- Part of Le Poizat-Lalleyriat
- Location of Lalleyriat
- Location within France Location within Auvergne-Rhône-Alpes
- Coordinates: 46°09′19″N 5°42′56″E
- Country: France
- Region: Auvergne-Rhône-Alpes
- Department: Ain
- Arrondissement: Nantua
- Canton: Nantua
- Commune: Le Poizat-Lalleyriat
- Area^{1}: 15.25 km^{2} (5.89 sq mi)
- Elevation: 850 m (2,790 ft)
- Highest elevation: 1,241 m (4,072 ft)
- Lowest elevation: 497 m (1,631 ft)
- Population (2022): 253
  - Density: 16.6/km^{2} (43.0/sq mi)
- Time zone: UTC+01:00 (CET)
  - Summer (DST): UTC+02:00 (CEST)
- Postal code: 01130
- ^{1} French Land Register data, which excludes lakes, ponds, glaciers > 1 km^{2} (0.386 sq mi or 247 acres) and river estuaries.

Lalleyriat (French pronunciation: [lalɛʁja]) is a former commune in the Ain department in eastern France. On 1 January 2016, it was merged into the new commune Le Poizat-Lalleyriat.

== Geography ==
=== Climate ===
Lalleyriat has an oceanic climate (Köppen climate classification Cfb). The average annual temperature in Lalleyriat is 8.3 °C (46.9 °F). The average annual rainfall is 1,752.5 mm (69.00 in) with December as the wettest month. The temperatures are highest on average in July, at around 17.6 °C (63.7 °F), and lowest in January, at around 0.0 °C (32.0 °F). The highest temperature ever recorded in Lalleyriat was 37.5 °C (99.5 °F) on 31 July 1983; the coldest temperature ever recorded was −22.5 °C (−8.5 °F) on 9 January 1985.

Climate data for Lalleyriat (1981–2010 averages, extremes 1981−1997)
Month	Jan	Feb	Mar	Apr	May	Jun	Jul	Aug	Sep	Oct	Nov	Dec	Year
Record high °C (°F)	13.5 (56.3)	19.0 (66.2)	23.0 (73.4)	23.0 (73.4)	26.0 (78.8)	30.0 (86.0)	37.5 (99.5)	32.0 (89.6)	30.0 (86.0)	24.9 (76.8)	21.0 (69.8)	19.5 (67.1)	37.5 (99.5)
Mean daily maximum °C (°F)	2.9 (37.2)	4.2 (39.6)	7.9 (46.2)	11.0 (51.8)	15.8 (60.4)	19.3 (66.7)	23.2 (73.8)	22.6 (72.7)	18.0 (64.4)	12.9 (55.2)	7.0 (44.6)	3.7 (38.7)	12.4 (54.3)
Daily mean °C (°F)	0.0 (32.0)	0.8 (33.4)	4.0 (39.2)	6.6 (43.9)	11.0 (51.8)	14.4 (57.9)	17.6 (63.7)	17.2 (63.0)	13.3 (55.9)	9.2 (48.6)	3.8 (38.8)	0.9 (33.6)	8.3 (46.9)
Mean daily minimum °C (°F)	−3.0 (26.6)	−2.6 (27.3)	0.0 (32.0)	2.3 (36.1)	6.3 (43.3)	9.5 (49.1)	12.1 (53.8)	11.8 (53.2)	8.7 (47.7)	5.4 (41.7)	0.7 (33.3)	−1.8 (28.8)	4.2 (39.6)
Record low °C (°F)	−22.5 (−8.5)	−18.0 (−0.4)	−12.0 (10.4)	−8.0 (17.6)	−3.0 (26.6)	0.5 (32.9)	3.0 (37.4)	2.0 (35.6)	0.0 (32.0)	−6.0 (21.2)	−14.0 (6.8)	−14.5 (5.9)	−22.5 (−8.5)
Average precipitation mm (inches)	167.6 (6.60)	150.8 (5.94)	132.9 (5.23)	131.5 (5.18)	149.3 (5.88)	125.4 (4.94)	111.9 (4.41)	114.8 (4.52)	135.3 (5.33)	166.6 (6.56)	174.3 (6.86)	192.1 (7.56)	1,752.5 (69.00)
Average precipitation days (≥ 1.0 mm)	12.6	11.7	11.6	11.7	13.8	11.2	9.5	10.2	9.9	12.4	12.1	12.8	139.5
Source: Meteociel

== Population ==
Historical population
Year	Pop.	±% p.a.
2006	223	—
2011	248	+2.15%
2022	253	+0.18%
Source: INSEE

== See also ==
- Communes of the Ain department
