= Valence, Drôme =

Prefecture and commune in Auvergne-Rhône-Alpes, France

Valence Valença (Occitan)
- Prefecture and commune
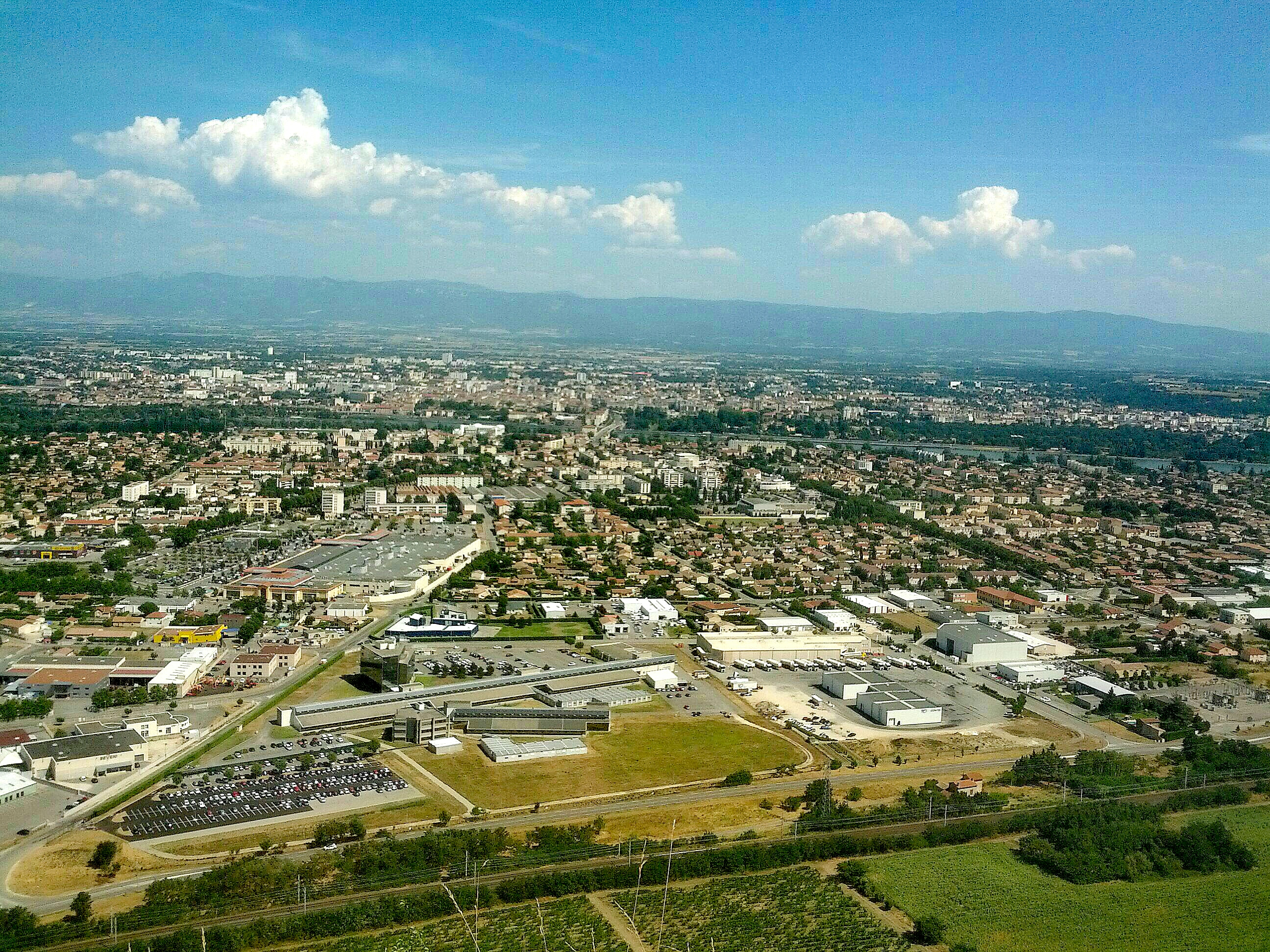
- View of the city of Valence

- Flag Coat of arms
- Location of Valence
- Location within France Location within Auvergne-Rhône-Alpes
- Coordinates: 44°56′00″N 4°53′30″E
- Country: France
- Region: Auvergne-Rhône-Alpes
- Department: Drôme
- Arrondissement: Valence
- Canton: Valence-1, 2, 3 and 4
- Intercommunality: CA Valence Romans Agglo

Government
  - Mayor (2020–2026): Nicolas Daragon (LR)
- Area^{1}: 36.69 km^{2} (14.17 sq mi)
- Elevation: 123 m (404 ft)
- Highest elevation: 191 m (627 ft)
- Lowest elevation: 106 m (348 ft)
- Population (2023): 64,458
  - Density: 1,757/km^{2} (4,550/sq mi)
- Demonym: Valentinois
- Time zone: UTC+01:00 (CET)
  - Summer (DST): UTC+02:00 (CEST)
- INSEE/Postal code: 26362 /26000
- ^{1} French Land Register data, which excludes lakes, ponds, glaciers > 1 km^{2} (0.386 sq mi or 247 acres) and river estuaries.

Valence (US: /vəˈlɒ̃s, væˈlɒ̃s/, French: [valɑ̃s]; Occitan: Valença [vaˈlensɔ]) is a commune in southeastern France, the prefecture of the Drôme department and within the Auvergne-Rhône-Alpes region. It is situated on the left bank of the Rhône, about 100 kilometres (62 mi) south of Lyon, along the railway line that runs from Paris to Marseille.

Valence proper has about 64,000 inhabitants, and is the centre of an urban area with 132,000 inhabitants. The city is divided into four cantons.

Located in the heart of the Rhone corridor, Valence is often referred to as "the door to the South of France", the local saying à Valence le Midi commence ("at Valence the Midi begins") pays tribute to the city's southern culture. Between Vercors and Provence, its geographical location attracts many tourists. Axes of transport and communications are the A7 and A49 autoroutes, the RN7, Paris/Marseille TGV line, as well as the Rhône. In addition, the Valence agglomeration is equipped with a marina, a trading port, two railway stations (Valence-Ville and Valence-TGV) and an airport. Its business is essentially turned towards the sectors of agriculture, metallurgy, engineering and electronics.

The commune, founded in 121 BC, after the invasion of Gallia Narbonensis by the Romans, it moved quickly to become the largest crossroad behind Lyon. With its growing importance, Valence gained the status of Roman colony. Over the centuries, the town grew and grew. Today, many vestiges of the Middle Ages, Renaissance, but also from the 17th century, 18th century and 19th century are visible in the city centre. The city is historically attached to the Dauphiné, of which it forms the second largest city after Grenoble and is today part of the network of French Towns and Lands of Art and History.

Monuments in Valence include the Maison des Têtes, built between 1528 and 1532 by Antoine de Dorne, the Saint-Apollinaire Cathedral, built between 1063 and 1099 under the leadership of Bishop Gontard and also the monumental fountain designed by the architect Eugène Poitoux. The city has many historical monuments, most of which are in Vieux Valence. Inscribed on the list of floral towns and villages of France, Valence is one of the seventeen municipalities of the Rhône-Alpes region to be labeled "four flowers" by the Concours des villes et villages fleuris, i.e. the maximum level.

== History ==
The demonym corresponding to Valence is Valentinois, but "Valentinois" also designates a geographical area, and one of the old provinces of France, with its capital Valence having been part of the province of Dauphiné.

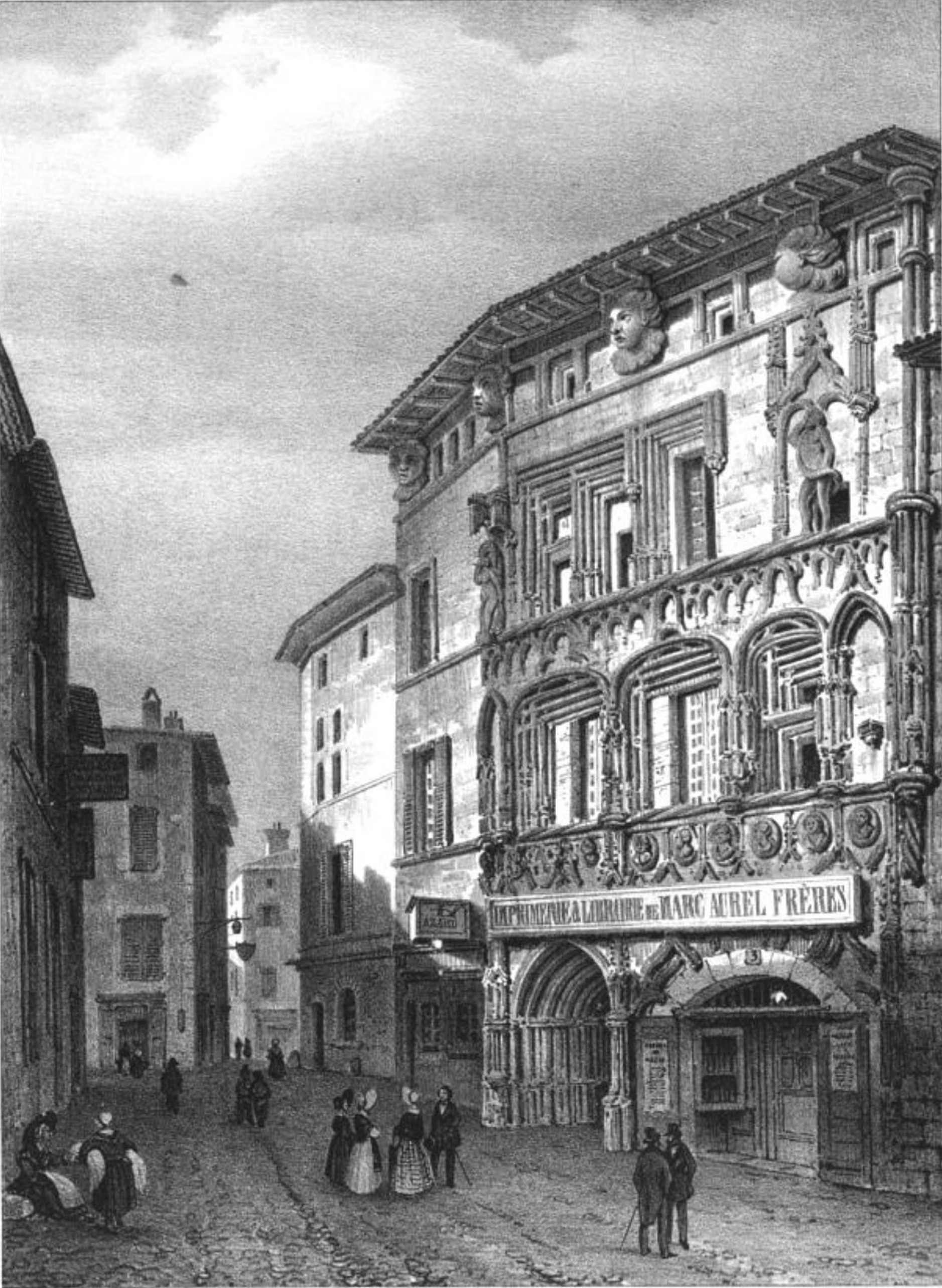
The Maison des Têtes and the Grande Rue (1830).

The word valence comes from Latin valentia, meaning "strength or capacity". Known in Roman times as Valentia Julia, the city had been the capital of the Segovellauni, and the seat of a celebrated school prior to the Roman conquest. It became a colony under Augustus, and was an important town of Viennensis Prima under Valentinian I. It was the seat of a bishopric perhaps as early as the 4th century.

In the 5th century, control of Valentia passed from the Romans to the Alans and other barbarians: in 413, the Goths under Ataulf besieged and captured the brother of the usurper Jovinus, Sebastianus, at Valentia on behalf of the emperor Honorius. In 440, Alans led by Sambida were given deserted lands in Valentia by the Romans. Three years later, Aetius settled the Burgundians in the region, under King Gondioc which became part of the Kingdom of the Burgundians. His son, Chilperic II, ruled Valence from 473 to 493 when he was slain by his brother Gundobad. Chilperic's daughter Clotilde married Clovis, the King of the Franks, in 493. Clovis's son Childebert I attacked the Burgundians in 534, adding their territory to the Frankish Kingdom. The city then fell successively under the power of the Franks, the Arabs of Spain, the sovereigns of Arles, the emperors of Germany, the counts of Valentinois, the counts of Toulouse, as well as its own bishops, who struggled to retain the control of the city they had won in the fifth century. These bishops were often in conflict with the citizens and the counts of Valentinois and to strengthen their hands against the latter the pope in 1275 united their bishopric with that of Die.

The citizens put themselves under the protection of the dauphin, and in 1456 had their rights and privileges confirmed by Louis XI and put on an equal footing with those of the rest of Dauphiné, the bishops consenting to recognize the suzerainty of the dauphin. In the 16th century Valence became the centre of Protestantism for the province in 1563. The town was fortified by King Francis I. It became the seat of a celebrated university in the middle of the 15th century; but the revocation of the Edict of Nantes in 1685 struck a fatal blow at its industry, commerce and population.

=== Toponymy ===
The conquest of Gaul by Julius Caesar made the Rhône corridor a major north-south communication axis, linking with the new Roman possessions around the Mediterranean Sea. Many settlements were founded, including Valentia, a Latin name meaning "valiant, strong", in the territory of the Segovellauni.

The town is named Valença in Occitan (Classical norm), Valènço in literary Provençal and Valinço in local Vivaro-Alpine (Mistralian norm).

=== Heraldry ===
Arms of Valence	The arms of Valence are blazoned : "Gules on a Cross argent a Tower azure." Motto: Unguibus et Rostro (With claws and beak).

=== Antiquity ===
==== At the end of prehistory ====
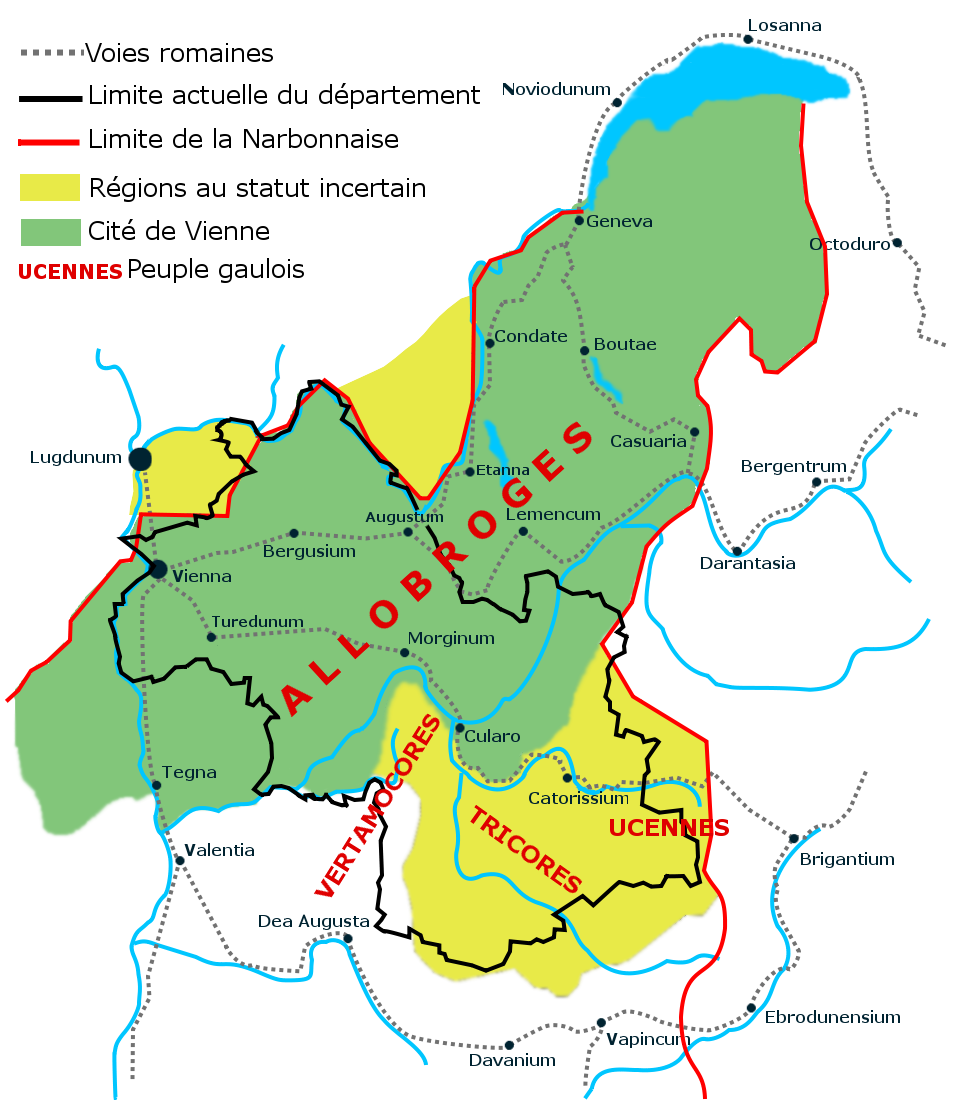
Territory of the Allobroges.

The city of Massalia, long on good terms with Rome, asked it for help against the Salyes who had ravaged its territory. The intervention of the Romans, from 125 BC, assured its safety but the war continued against the Allobroges, among whom the Salyes people had found refuge. In August 121 BC, the army of Quintus Fabius Maximus crushed them at the Battle of the Isère River (confluence of the Rhône and Isère) according to Strabo (Geographica, IV, 1, 11).

Orosius noted that Gaius Marius, who was sent by Rome to stop the Cimbri and the Teutons, had established his camp not far from the confluence of the Rhône and the Isère. The excavations on the upper part of the plateau of Lautagne (2.5 kilometres (1.6 mi) south of the centre of Valence) revealed the presence of devices of a defensive nature dating from the 1st century BC: Thus the foundation of the city could have come from a Roman military camp.

Even under the Roman domination, the Allobroges tribe established themselves north of Isère, and repeatedly rebelled against the Roman occupation. The Battle of Solonion was the last to take place, identifiable with the modern commune of Soyons (Solo by Livy, Epitome 103) in 62 BC.

==== The selection of the site ====
The city of Valentia was established on a terrace on the left bank of the Rhône river, 5 kilometres (3.1 mi) south of the confluence of the Isère and 15 kilometres (9.3 mi) from the Drôme.

This geographical situation is understood by the crossing of several routes of transport and communications:

- Valentia had a privileged place in north-south trade through the Rhône and at the Via Agrippa.
- Valentia was part of east-west routes since the different paths, which traversed the plain from the Isère Valley and the Drôme (Voie des Alpes), converged on the city. The Rhône was crossed at Valence on a ferry, by ford or over a bridge.

==== The ancient city ====
The city of Valence, as many Gallo-Roman cities, received an orthonormal plan. The orientation of the urban streets network successively followed cadastres "A" inclined N, 12°30'E and "B", inclined N, 23°E, in the Valence plain.

We know the decumanus of the city thanks to the discovery of a pavement and a sewer a few metres north of the city hall. The cardo of the urban network was the Via Agrippa that crossed the city in a straight line from the southern gate of the city to the old gate and Tower of Aion, north of the city, which later became "Tourdeon" (now destroyed).

It was along the Via Agrippa that a forum was located, probably surrounded by a civil basilica, curia, a temple, etc., of which the location is unknown.

To the south of the presumed forum site, between the Rue du Théâtre and Rue Vernoux the ruins of the thermae were discovered. This thermal water supply, and more generally that of the city of Valentia, was thanks to the numerous springs in the vicinity. The site of Valence still presents a dense network of streams and canals born of the overflow of water which escapes in sources at the foot of the terraces, forming, in the east, a curved line from the source of the Treuil up to the Fountain of Malcontents, and near the Rhône and the lower town, a quasi-parallel line to the river from the Saint-Pierre source until the descent of the Boulevard Gambetta. Thus, the Chony quarter (in the current commune of Bourg-lès-Valence), were found remains of pipes that belonged to the aqueduct that brought water from the source of the Treuil to Valence.

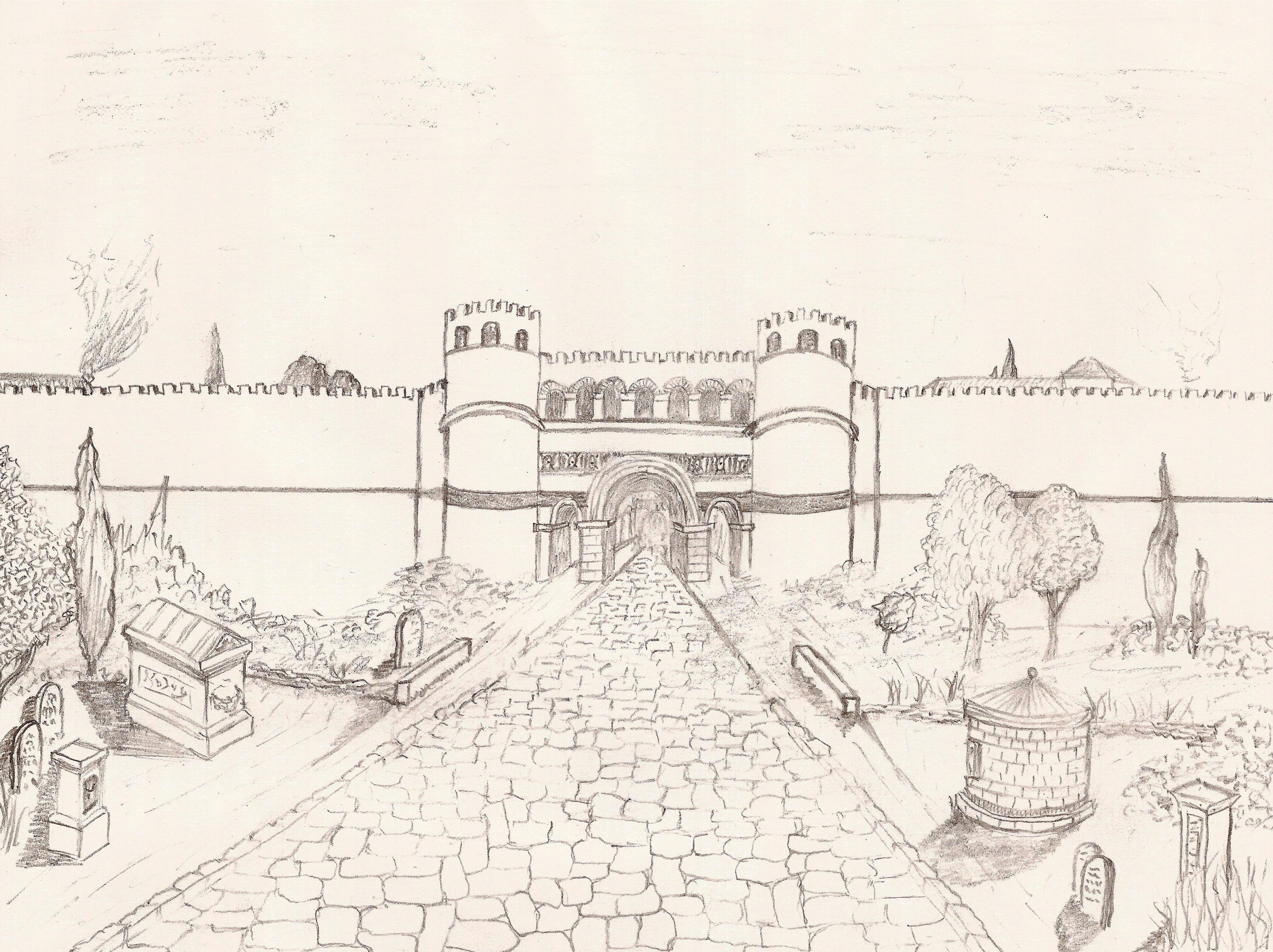
Evocation of the southern gateway to the city of Valentia under the early Roman Empire.

All around the current cathedral were discovered fragments of architecture probably belonging to a large temple.

The city had entertainment facilities:

- A circus whose memory would be preserved in the name of the Cire quarter ("Siry" in the Middle Ages).
- An amphitheatre, was on the edge of the Rhône, outside of the enclosure or near the New Gate.
- A Côte Sainte-Ursule theatre: Three surveys have revealed the orchestra, traces of large markets and large wall elements. It was located at the northern edge of the city.
- An odeon whose curvature would be materialized by the Rue du Croissant. In fact, the foundations of an odeon were found during the construction of the new museum, in the Place des Ormeaux and its outline is materialised on the ground at the entrance to the museum.

The city was surrounded by ramparts from the early Roman Empire. This was constructed between 15 BC and 15 AD. In 1869, excavations to the south of the old town revealed the existence of a monumental gate defended by two protruding towers. The façade, or at least the pillars which were observed during the excavation, was covered with a large piece of sandstone and adorned with a frieze of military trophies: shields, leggings and breastplates.

Houses settled around the city, outside the city walls.

- To the east of the city of Valentia, not far from the Voie des Alpes (in the direction of Die and Gap), in the current Rue Faventines.
- To the west, in the Nonniers quarter, in the commune of Guilherand-Granges (right bank of the Rhône, facing Valence): A bridge or a ferry connecting the banks of the river.

The ancient port was perhaps on the territory of the current commune of Bourg-les-Valence.

Numerous tombs were crowded at the exit of the city, along the tracks: Several burial grounds were discovered in the east and south of the ancient city.

==== Late antiquity ====
During the first centuries of the Christian era, Valence became an important road junction on maps and routes, and the late Roman Empire, this city retained its privileged position.

However, as early as the 4th century, Valentia faced many raids but the city within the ramparts retained its monumental adornments competing according to Ammianus Marcellinus (Histoires, XV, 11, 14), with Arles and Vienne.

At the dawn of the 5th century, the city lived in shelter of the ramparts erected under the late Roman Empire (still a visible construction in the 19th century). The Visigoths seized Valence in 413 AD; the Burgundians were masters of the Rhône basin at the end of the 5th century; the Valence people fell to the Frankish Kingdom in 533 AD. These successive invasions removed almost all traces of Romanisation.

During this troubled period, the city converted its ancient walls into stronger fortifications: Roman gates were bricked up, thus doing away with the two main axes of the city and lasting restructuring of the urban network. The rural inhabitants settled on small hills of the plain, giving rise to a large number of villages: Montoison, Montmeyran, Montélier, Montvendre, Montéléger, etc.

=== Middle Ages ===
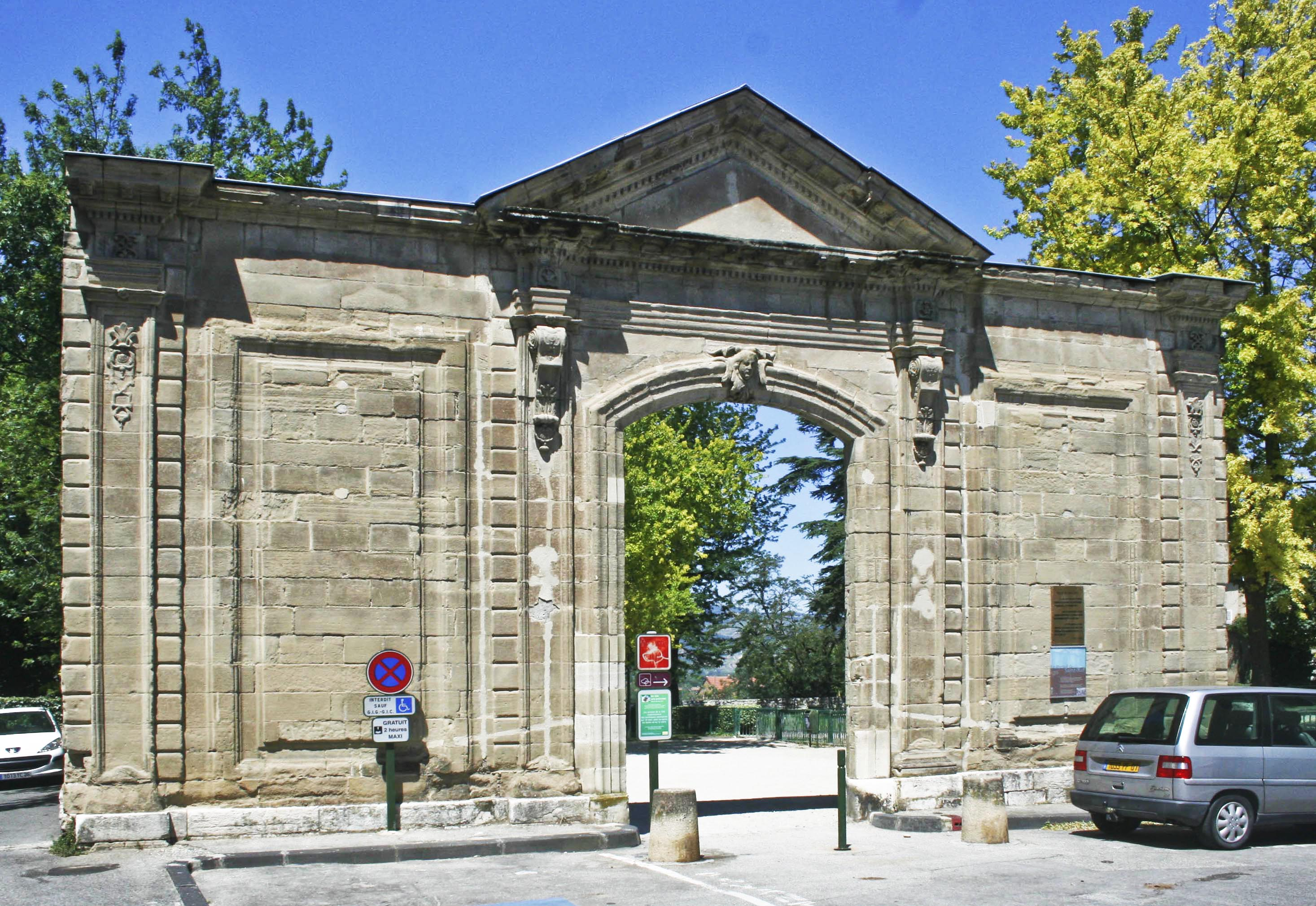
The old gate of the Saint-Ruf Abbey.

Around 800, a new Cathedral of Saint-Estève (of St. Stephen) was built instead of the baptistery, with a choir that was oriented to the west. It was constructed symmetrically to the Evangelist Church. It housed numerous relics: Those of saints Apollinaire, Cyprien, Corneille, Félix, Fortunat, Achillée and a fragment of the True Cross. The episcopal district also included housing for the canons, grouped around a court cemetery, and a round church, Notre-Dame-la-Ronde. At the beginning of the 9th century, perhaps before, the Roman wall was raised with walls constructed from pebbles. In 890, the widow of King Boso of Provence had their son, Louis III, crowned King of Provence in Valence.

In 1029, the Archbishop of Vienne invested Guigues III the Old of the County of Viennois. It belonged to the family of the Counts of Albon, which held the region for decades, frequently occupying the county and the Diocese of Valence. The region still suffered the raids of the Saracens at the end of the 9th and the 10th century.

The Rhône was sometimes presented as the border between the Kingdom of France and the Holy Roman Empire which made Valence part, until the 15th century, but it was especially a link between the countries bordering it. The Diocese of Valence, as the rival principality, the County of Valentinois and Diois, extended on both sides. It was also an important commercial axis, especially for salt, which would benefit the city which guards traces of the name of Rue "Saunière", formerly the name of one of the four gates of Valence, the one which gave access to the south. The city also benefitted from its position at a point of change in the regime of winds in the Rhône Valley: In the Middle Ages, vessels ascended the river only by being hauled to the col, by sweat (by men). North of Valence, the rise could be done under sail (but not always). At the end of the 15th century, it was even the capital of hauling along the towpath, because beside this advantage due to the wind, it was a one-day stop from Lyon, and a crossroads into the mountains. Finally, the rise of the Rhône was particularly difficult at Valence, which caused forced stops. Several Valentinois were specialised in the brokerage of haulers. The haulers pulled either a big boat or boat trains, with teams from a few dozen to several hundred men. Each man drew a mass of about a ton. This mode of hauling regressed at the end of the 15th century, to be replaced by hauling by horses, except for local hauling.

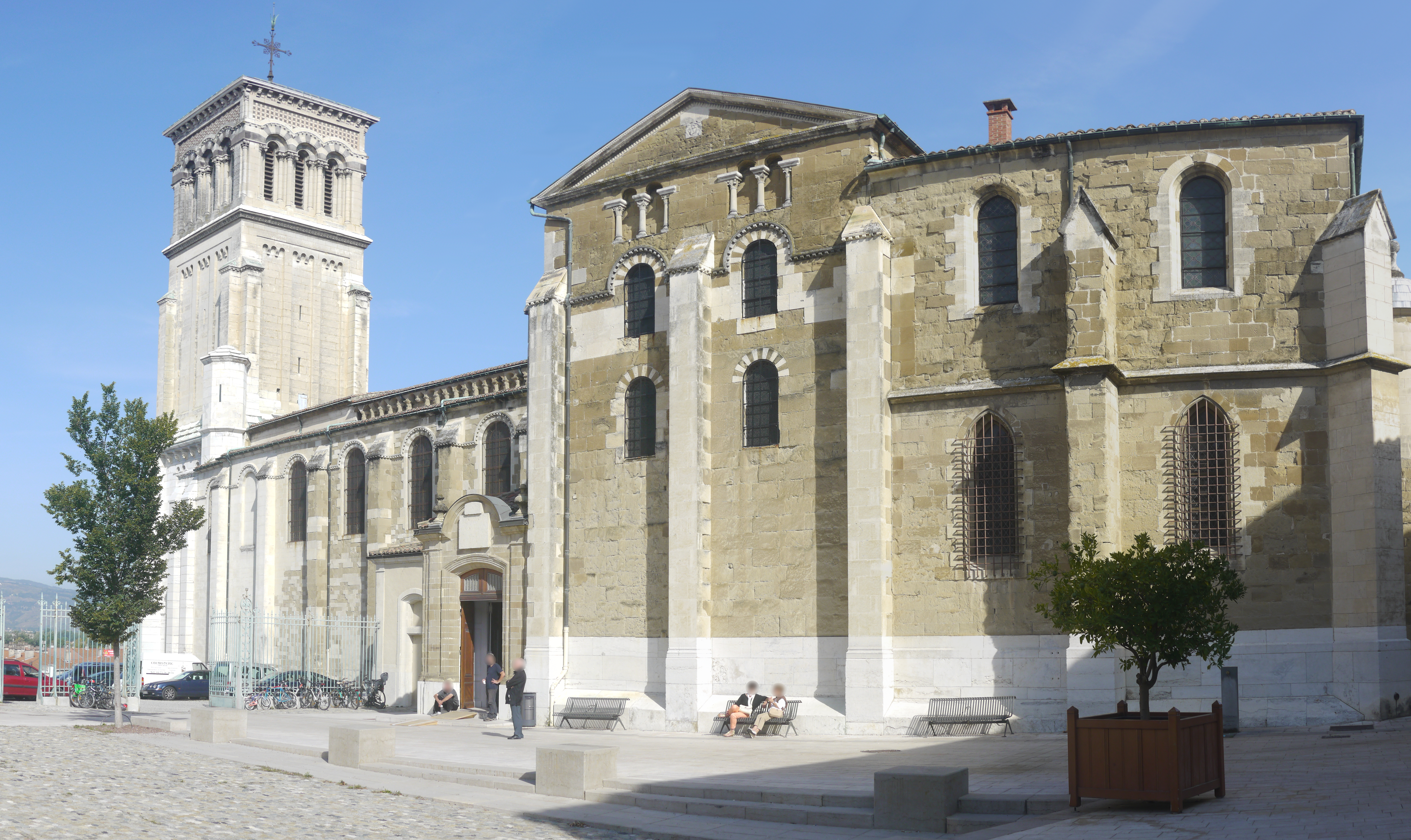
The Saint-Apollinaire Cathedral, seen from the Place des Ormeaux in Vieux Valence.

The city, safe from the flooding of the river and protected by its ramparts, was a step on the road for pilgrimages to Compostela. Religious life flourished, the Saint-Apollinaire Cathedral was built as well as the Abbey of the canons of Saint-Ruf. Two major characters vied for power over the city: The Bishop and the Count of Valentinois.

Economic growth translated into the development of towns, especially on the side of the Rhône: The Rivière (Riperia) said today, less poetically, as "Basse-Ville". The new city, north of the former Pomperi gate and Bourg-Saint-Pierre, formed around the Abbey of Saint-Pierre, which spawned the current commune of Bourg-lès-Valence. Elsewhere, on the middle terrace, habitat outside-the-walls was associated with religious foundations: The commandery of the Hospitallers, the Tourdeon gate, the Abbey of Saint-Félix, the Saint-Sulpice gate, the Faventines Templar Commandery, the Benedictine Priory of Saint-Victor in the south near the former Via Agrippa and, perhaps, further to the south, a leprosarium whose memory is retained through the channel of la Maladière.

After the disappearance of the County of Valentinois, incorporated into the Province of Dauphiné, the dauphin Louis II de Poitiers-Valentinois may have imposed homage to the Bishop and Abbot of Saint-Ruf (free abbot, with immunity from Royal taxes and so forth): Valence was therefore incorporated into the province of Dauphiné. On the death of Louis II, who was the last count, the Valentinois was sold in 1419 by his heirs, his daughter Louise de Poitiers (widow of Humbert VII de Thoire and Villars) and close relatives to Charles, dauphin and King of France (Charles VII). The County of Valentinois was attached to the Crown of France in 1424.

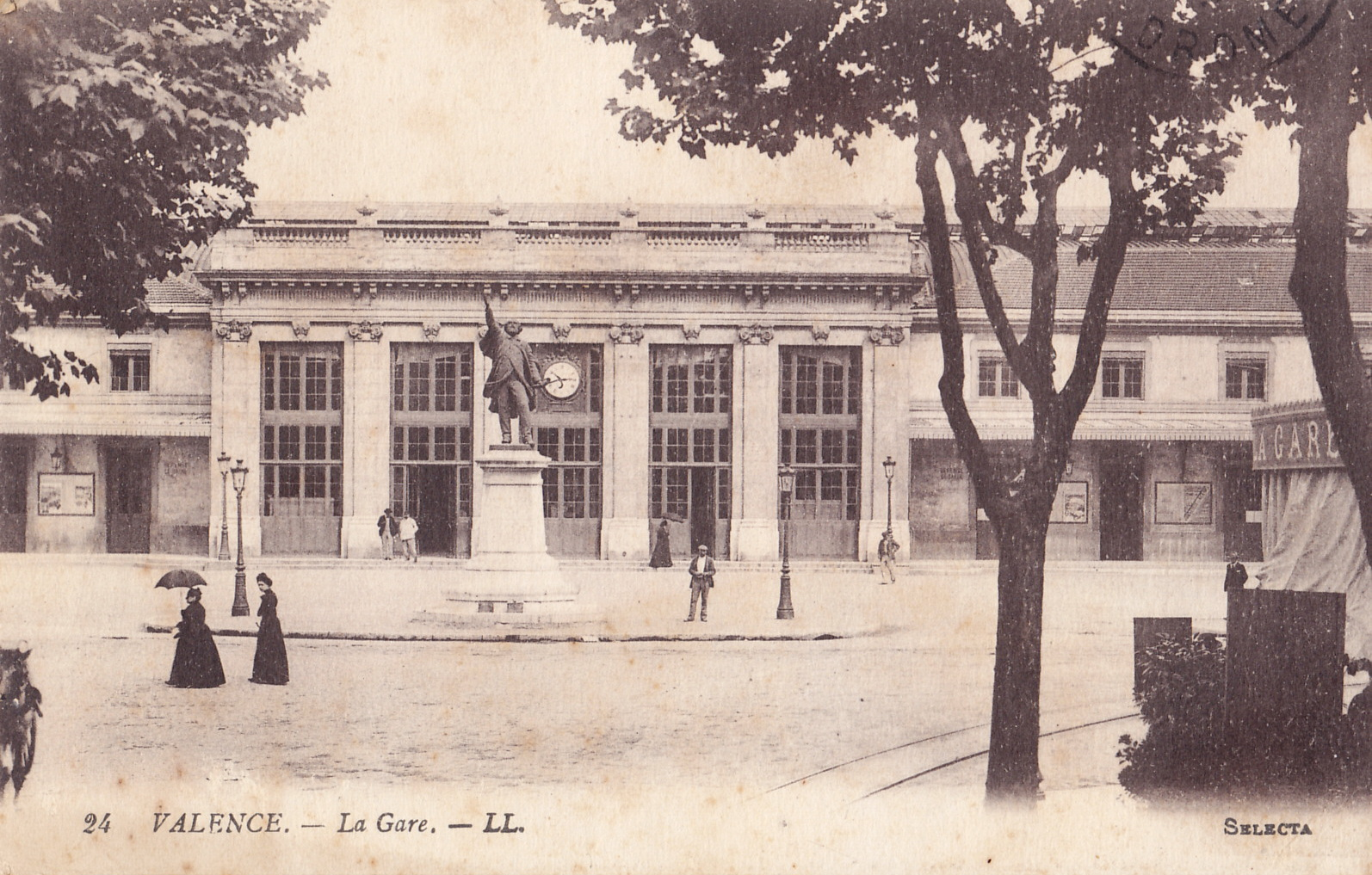
The city was connected to the railway in 1854. Valence-Ville Station is shown here with the statue of Bancel, in the 1920s.

The second half of the 15th century and the beginning of the 16th century were a golden age for the medieval city, materialised by the Maison des Têtes and the Pendentif de Valence. Founded on 26 July 1452 by the dauphin Louis, future Louis XI, the University of Valence grew quickly. Renowned professors from various countries, as Jacques Cujas forged its reputation by teaching the law, theology, medicine and arts. After his coronation, Louis XI confirmed its preference by mailing the letters patent for the university on 12 October 1461. In March 1480, the King still supported his preferred university.

The dauphin Louis made numerous stays in Valence where, as a sign of allegiance, he donated a gate to the city, the Saunière gate and a few houses nearby. It made for a "delphinal palace", later occupied by the religious order of the Recollects. As Louis XI, he allowed a market in the town of Valence, in 1476, during his stay in the city and confirmed tax privileges for the city of Valence.

This era ended abruptly in 1562 during the occupation of the city by the troops of the Protestant Baron des Adrets: All the religious buildings of Valence were partially or completely destroyed.

=== Early Modern era ===
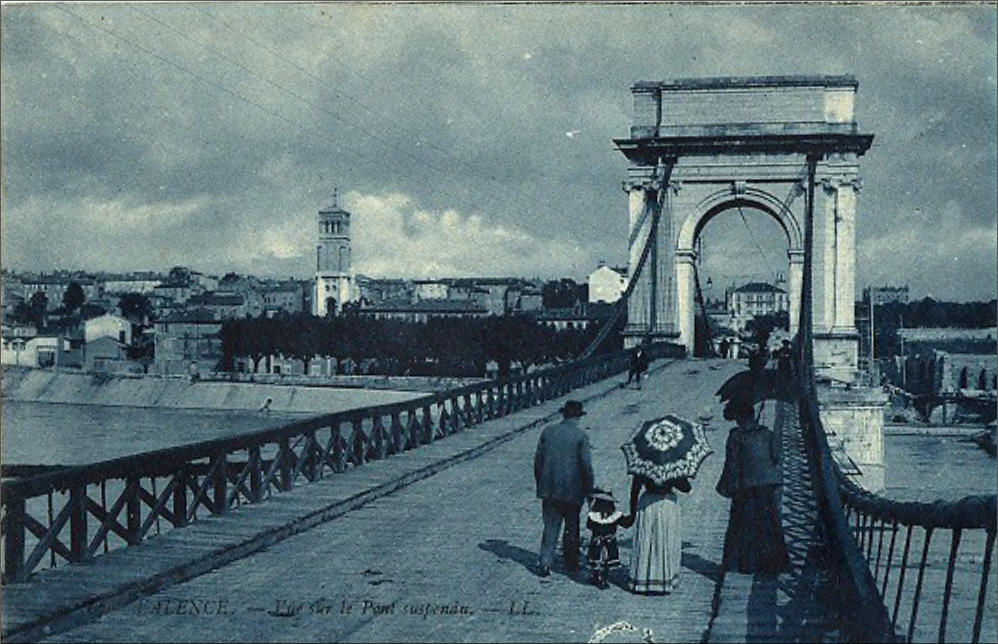
The Segiun gateway (1900), built from 1827 replaced the old stone bridge, and then by the current Frédéric Mistral Bridge.

François Rabelais studied at Valence in 1532, before settling in Lyon, a great cultural centre where the library trade blossomed.

A strategic location in the Rhône Valley, Valence had been militarised since its origin and had 7,100 inhabitants in the 1700s, who bore responsibility for housing soldiers. To reduce this burden a municipal deliberation was offered in 1714: a barracks was constructed in the current Rue Bouffier, a temporary camp which quickly became inadequate to accommodate the 12,000 men and 20,000 horses stationed there. The city invested 190,000 livres for the installation of a new barracks in the Rollin quarter, north of the Roman road.

Charles IX passed through the town during his royal tour of France (1564–1566), accompanied by the Court and the nobles of the Kingdom: His brother the Duke of Anjou, Henri de Navarre and the Cardinals of Bourbon and Lorraine.

It was in Valence that the saga of Louis Mandrin ended in May 1755, the smuggler who challenged the Ferme Générale and redistributed the proceeds of his theft from it. After spending several days in the city prison, Mandrin was sentenced to death: It was conducted on the Place des Clercs where the scaffold was erected, his death ensued on the breaking wheel. His body was exposed after his death, during three days, and many people flocked to pay him a last tribute, as his popularity increased. The death of Mandrin on the wheel of Valence marked the end of his actions, but also the beginning of a legend, as the man had marked the minds of his contemporaries.

Napoleon Bonaparte was assigned in the city from 1785 to 1786 in the La Fère artillery regiment. He made many future visits. He would indeed return repeatedly to Valence. It included crossing the city on 12 October 1799, during the return of the expedition to Egypt, and offered to his former landlady who came to welcome him at the posthouse, a cashmere of India (offered to the Sisters of the Blessed Sacrament), a compass and a powder spoon (available at the Museum of Valence in 1862). He also met the future Cardinal Spina, who would negotiate on behalf of Pope Pius VII in the Concordat of 1801, on the same day.

=== French Revolution ===
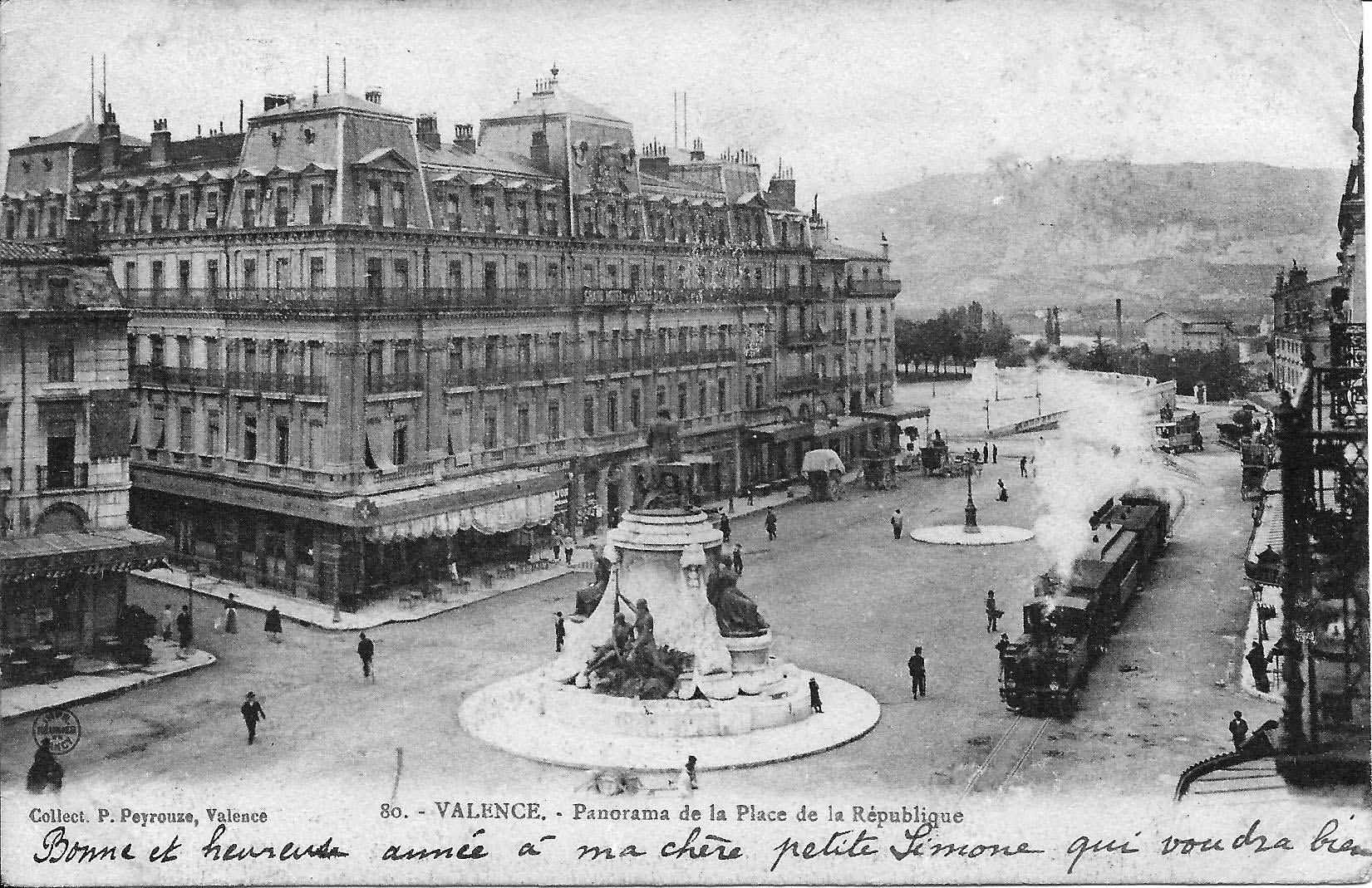
A steam train of Ardèche, in the Place de la République (in 1910)

After the convening of the Estates-General, agitation and anxiety grew until the storming of the Bastille, news of which reached the region around 20 July, causing hope but also increasing concerns of a reactionary plot of aristocrats. The Great Fear arose in the region of a rumor, and spread by degrees, at a blistering pace according to local networks, putting all the villages in motion for their defence. Once the peak of fear passed, a latent anxiety remained, the village communities realised that in an emergency, they were in fact isolated and practically reduced to their own devices. National guards were formed quickly, including in Valence, but communities found it insufficient, and they constituted local federations of mutual assistance, bypassing the old provincial divisions. In the region, it was Largentière which called for a Fête de la Fédération on 23 August, Romans-sur-Isère in September, La Voulte gathered 12,000 National Guardsmen to the Champs de l'Étoile on 29 November. Valence invited the surrounding communities on 31 January and brought together 16,000 guards of 293 communes. The region had other celebrations of federation in the winter and spring, culminating in the Fête de la Fédération of 14 July 1790, celebrated in Paris and simultaneously in 250 cities in France, including Valence.

The university disappeared in 1792 to be reborn at the end of the 20th century. It is now in the 21st Century part of the Community Grenoble Alpes University.

This community played another role during the final years of the French Revolution. On 29 August 1799, six weeks after his arrival at this community, the then longest ever reigning Roman Catholic Church's 250th Pope Pius VI died here in exile from his Vatican, then within the 754–1798 Papal States, but now within the 1st Republic of France's created 1798–1799 Roman Republic. After some political intrigue covering more than two years, it will not be until 24 December 1801, that the then late pope's body will finally leave Valence and return to the Vatican.

=== 19th century ===
During the repression of January and February 1894, the police conducted raids targeting the anarchists living there, without much success.

=== 20th century ===
==== Armenian community ====
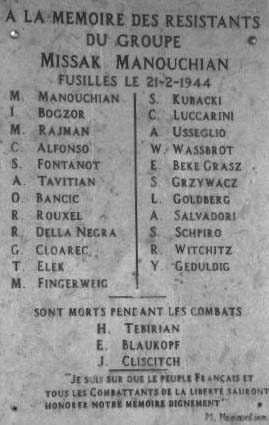
Memorial to the Manouchian group of Valence

After the Armenian genocide of 1915, many Armenians took refuge in France in the 1920s. The community remembers how Valence employers travelled to Marseille to recruit 150 of the first arrivals in 1922. By 1926 827 Armenians had settled in Valence, and 1,670 by 1931 – from Bursa, Malatya and Harput. If the Armenians were popular among their employers, they encountered the distrust of the Valence people. It was a group with a very high proportion of young adults, children and the elderly who suffered most from the genocide and from the journey into exile. They worked mainly as labourers, or founded small businesses (25% of employed persons). Very quickly, an "Armenian quarter" developed between Boulevard Vauban, Rue Farnerie, Rue Madier-Montjau, and the Boulevard d'Alsace, 40% populated by Armenians. The entire old town, with dilapidated buildings, abandoned and inexpensive, became involved in this process.

In 1956 the group had 2,500 people, or 6% of the population of Valence, and represented the fourth-largest Armenian community in France (after those of Paris, Lyon and Marseille). The community's very strong identity (with newspapers, cinemas, dance halls, Armenian Sports Union) was dispersed, with the "Armenian village" on the Rue de Fontlozier. It showed signs of rapid integration: In 1946, half of the 2,000 Armenians of Valencia opted for French citizenship.

In 1947, 200 Armenians of Valence took advantage of the offer to return to the Soviet countries, which proved to be a failure. The strong community welcomed new refugees, escaping from political turmoil in Syria during the 1950-60s, and Lebanon during the Civil war in 1970-80s. As of 1997 7,500 people in Valence belonged to this community, which makes the Armenian community of Valence one of the largest in France: the Armenian National Union is also based in Valence.

This strong presence has passed into the odonymy: a street and a square of the old Armenian quarter make reference to it: the Rue d'Arménie and the Place Missak Manouchian. The cultural life of the community is very active, with 28 associations, including the Evangelical Church, the Armenian courts, and the House of Armenian culture.

==== World War II ====
After the invasion of Poland by Germany, on 1 September 1939, France and the United Kingdom declared war on Germany on 3 September 1939. Germany invaded France, Belgium, Luxembourg and the Netherlands on 10 May 1940.

During World War II, Valence suffered several allied aerial bombardments, intended to destroy the bridge over the Rhône. On 15 August 1944, bombs destroyed several quarters and buildings in the city, including the hospital, killing 280 people. From the era of the prefecture, there remained only the gate, which has been carefully preserved since. Four days later, on 19 August 1944, a German train loaded with nitroglycerin exploded, largely destroying the quarter of La Palla and causing 335 casualties among civilians, the military and the resistance fighters. On 2 August 1944, south of Valence, bombings of the railway depot and yard of Portes-lès-Valence destroyed 51 locomotives, with 12 victims and 58 wounded among the railway workers and the population.

The northern part of Valence, almost completely razed to the ground, was rebuilt and today one finds many administrative buildings in this area such as the Hotel of prefecture of the Drôme, the general treasury, social security, the post office and the police headquarters.

Drôme was one of the departments where the Resistance was the most active. In 1943, the Resistance was organised and grew, and many Drôme people were called and committed themselves to the cause. With the introduction of the STO, young men were required to go to work in Germany. Many of them refused this situation and went into hiding in the countryside or joined the Maquis. Resistance developed throughout the entire department in small units. The Drôme terrain was conducive to the installation of camps. The population supported increasing resistance.

== Geography ==
=== Location ===
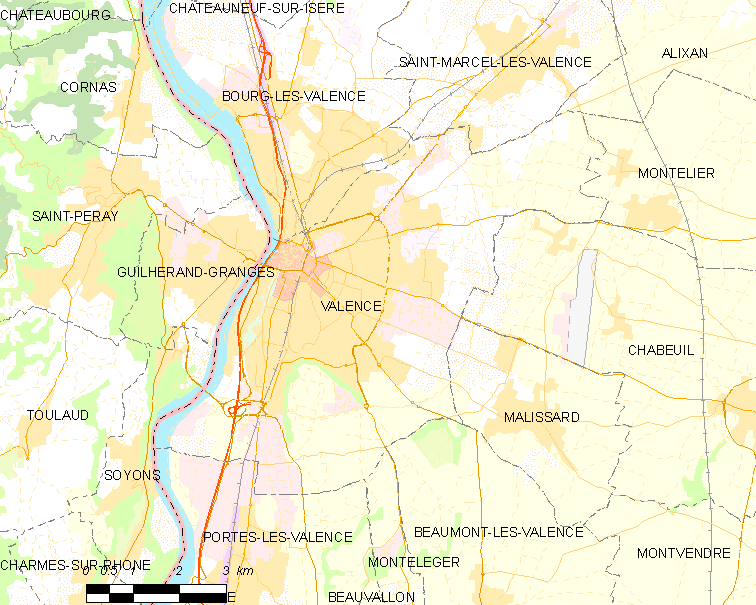
Valence and the communes of its agglomeration

By its geographical location, Valence is one of the points of compulsory passage between Paris and the Mediterranean Sea. Its position at the centre of the meridian axis of the Rhone Valley places the city at the mouth of the Valley of the Isère (path to the Alps), in the west of the historical province of Dauphiné, within the natural and historic region of the Valentinois, and the boundary of the department of Ardèche (from which it is separated by the Rhône). The city is surrounded by several mountain ranges, including the Massif Central and the Ardèche hills to the west, and the Vercors Massif in the French Prealps to the east. Valence is 561 kilometres (349 mi) to the southeast of Paris, equidistant (100 kilometres (62 mi)) south of Lyon and southwest of Grenoble, 120 kilometres (75 mi) north of Avignon, 220 kilometres (140 mi) north of Marseille, 204 kilometres (127 mi) north of Montpellier, 110 kilometres (68 mi) south-west of Saint-Étienne, 113 kilometres (70 mi) to the east of Le Puy-en-Velay, 50 kilometres (31 mi) north of Montélimar, 40 kilometres (25 mi) to the east of Privas and 65 kilometres (40 mi) to the west of Die. Located a few kilometres south of the 45th parallel, the city is often referred to as the "gateway to Southern France." "À Valence le Midi commence" [At Valence the Midi commences], say people from the north.

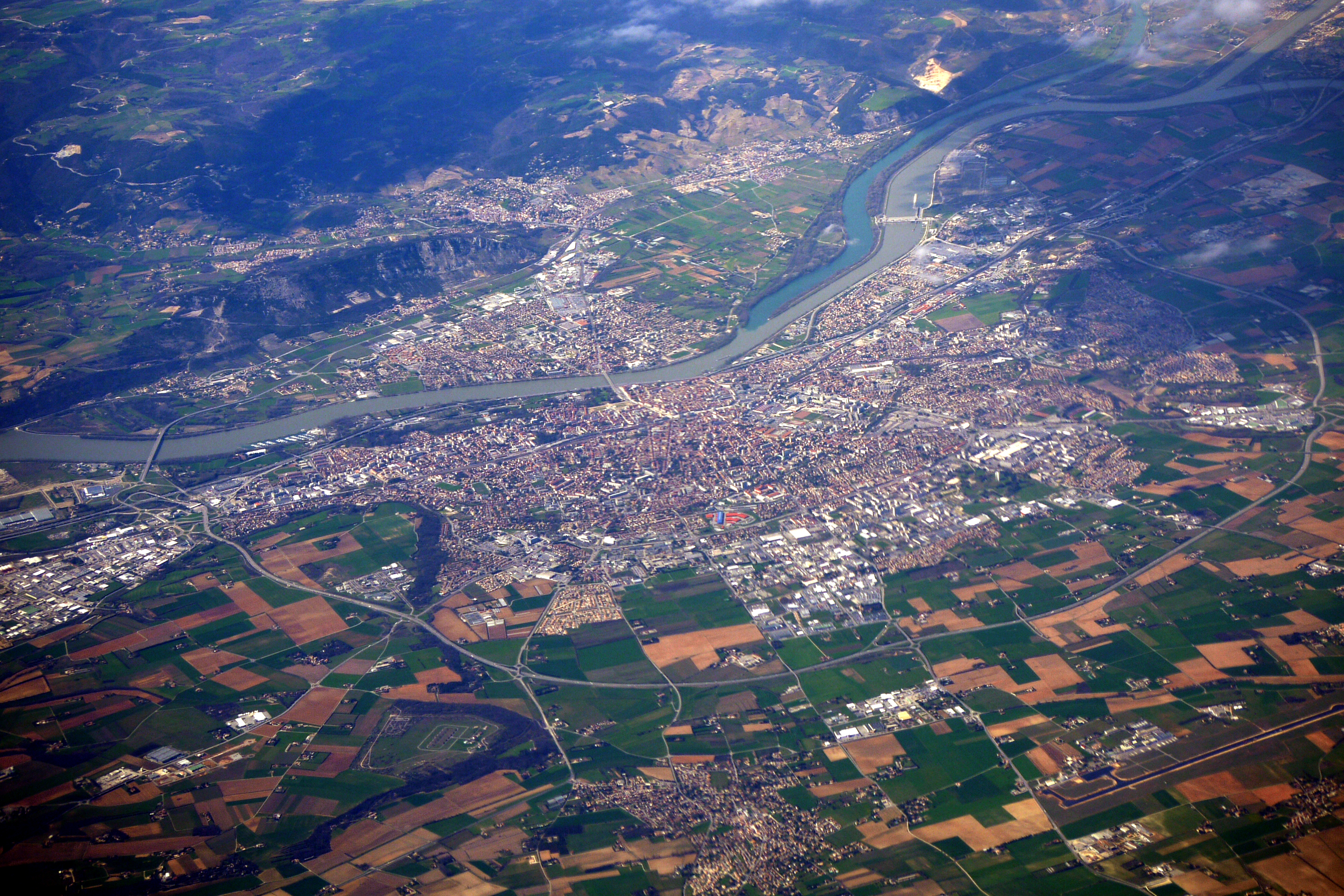
An aerial view of Valence

The agglomeration is based on four alluvial terraces ranging on the left bank of the Rhone:

- The lowest, which is closest to the river, where the districts of fishermen and sailors were.
- The intermediate terrace, safe from the floods of the river, which grew into the historic city, first within its walls, then expanded outside.
- The third terrace, highly urbanised in the second half of the 20th century.
- The highest, called the plateau of Lautagne which has developed as a centre of technological activities since the end of the 20th century on the edge of grain and vegetable farms.

Administratively, the commune is located in the south of the Auvergne-Rhône-Alpes region, in the northern half of the Drôme department (of which it is the prefecture), and in the south-west of the Arrondissement of Valence (of which it is the capital). Moreover, Valence is the chef-lieu of four cantons, Valence-1, Valence-2, Valence-3 and Valence-4, the city is therefore divided into four at the cantonal level. The commune is part of the Communauté d'agglomération Valence Romans Agglo, which includes 56 communes since its inception on 1 January 2017, and Valence is the most populous city. Valence was previously part of two intercommunalities: SISAV (Intercommunal Union of Services of the Valentinoise Agglomeration, better known under the name of "Valence Major") which includes seven Drôme and Ardèche communes (Bourg-lès-Valence, Cornas, Guilherand-Granges, Portes-lès-Valence, Saint-Marcel-lès-Valence, Saint-Péray and Valence) from 1990 to 2009, and of the agglomeration community of Valence Agglo – Sud Rhône-Alpes which consisted of eleven communes from 2009 to 2014.

=== Relief and geology ===
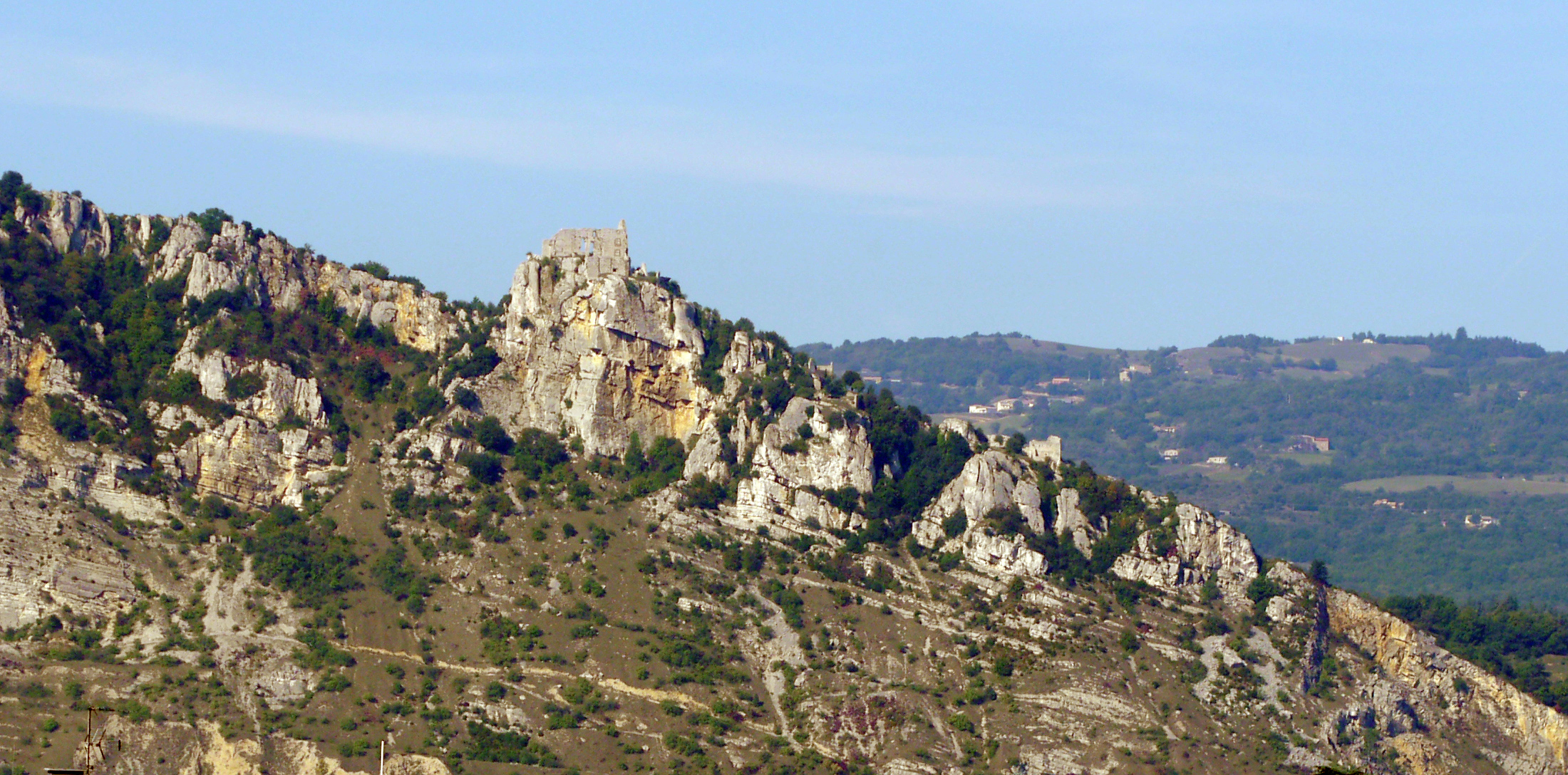
View of the ruined Château de Crussol, in Ardèche, seen from the esplanade of the Champ de Mars.

The area of the commune is 3,669 hectares (9,070 acres), representing 36.69 square kilometres (14.17 sq mi); the altitude varies between 106–191 metres (348–627 ft).

The granitic base, cut by the Rhône in the Saint-Vallier/Tain-l'Hermitage pass, is covered by 4,000 metres (13,000 ft) of sediments in the Valence trough. In the Miocene, a molasse formed of detrital rocks due to the erosion of the Alps and the Massif Central, was deposited in a shallow sea. Its thickness can reach 400–500 metres (1,300–1,600 ft). During the Pliocene, the sea was reduced into a lake, resulting in lacustrine deposits and loess formation. During the Quaternary, between glacial periods, moraines were swept away by the meltwater in the interglacial stages and were carved by the rivers. Thus, nested terraces were formed. These nested terraces of Isère and Rhône eventually filled the gap of Valence.

The Drôme des Collines, which integrates Valence, formed at the end of the Miocene. Under the effect of the Alpine thrust, the area was covered by a lake and fluvio-lacustrine molasse formed with a few ripples in the plain of Valence. The confluence of the Isère and Rhône and fluvial erosion caused by their waters, in the Quaternary, formed four superimposed terraces which are located in Valence.

=== Hydrography ===
Valence is watered by the Rhône river, the commune is on the left bank. One of its tributaries also crosses the city: The Épervière, a 2.6 kilometres (1.6 mi)-long river, formed by the joining of most of the city's channels, among others.

=== Plain of Valence ===
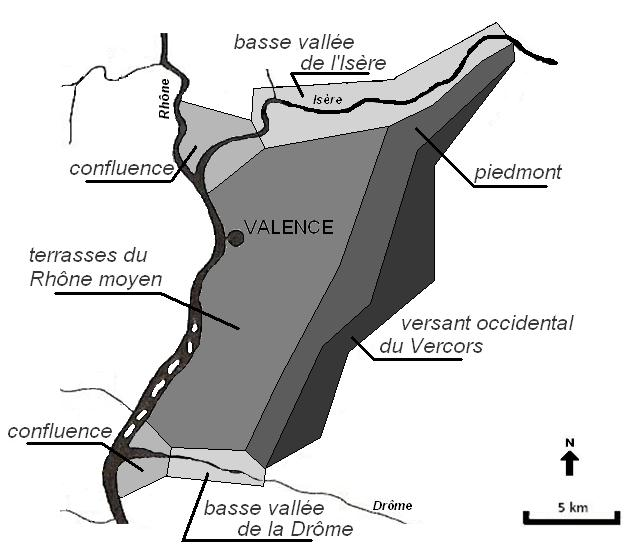
Landscape units of Valentinois

The city gave its name to a well-defined geographical region: The Valentinois. Over more than three-quarters of its territory, this region corresponds to the plain of Valence, shaped by successive beds of the Rhône which are abandoned fertile sedimentary deposits. Indeed, this plain, perfectly bounded by the Rhône Valleys to the west, the Isère in the north, and the Drome to the south, gives the appearance of a cheerful orchard with peach, apricot and cherry trees, alternating with cereal and vegetable crops. Large farms, conquered one by one by the inhabitants of Valence, punctuate this agricultural area, barely broken by rivers and canals for irrigation, with groves and woods on its margins.

To the east, the Monts du Matin extend as a long barrier of pleasant hills, dominated by the limestone prow of the Vercors. To the south, beyond the Drôme Valley, the plain ends at the foot of the massif carrying the vast forest of Marsanne, topped by wind turbines.

To the north, beyond the Isère Valley, the Romanais continues, geologically, Valence plain. The lower Miocene molasse in the north of the plain was covered by outwash alluvium of the Isère, whose terraces today still mark the shape of the Valentinois.

The view from the ruins of the Château de Crussol, in front after the first sharp turns in the road on leaving the Col des Limouches, the plain of Valence appears as it is, a large flat surface, bordered by two reliefs which are unobscured. It is also a very large area because of the same formation of physical organisation, one of successive terraces. Only the habitat and crops bring variation, due to the different nature of these terraces.

Today the plain of Valence is organised around the Valence infrastructure whose urban sprawl gradually extends across its whole area. A number of communes however retain their village identity and their rural character, protecting them from changing into dormitory towns. These are ancient agricultural villages, especially those that precede the first villages on the side of Vercors. Their names evoke an initial high placement to readily give a defensive view of the plain of Valence: Montélier, Montvendre, Montéléger, Montoison, Montmeyran and Beaumont-lès-Valence.

However, the territories corresponding to the plain of Valence and the Valentinois do not include west of the agglomeration, which is located in the neighbouring department of Ardèche.

=== Climate ===
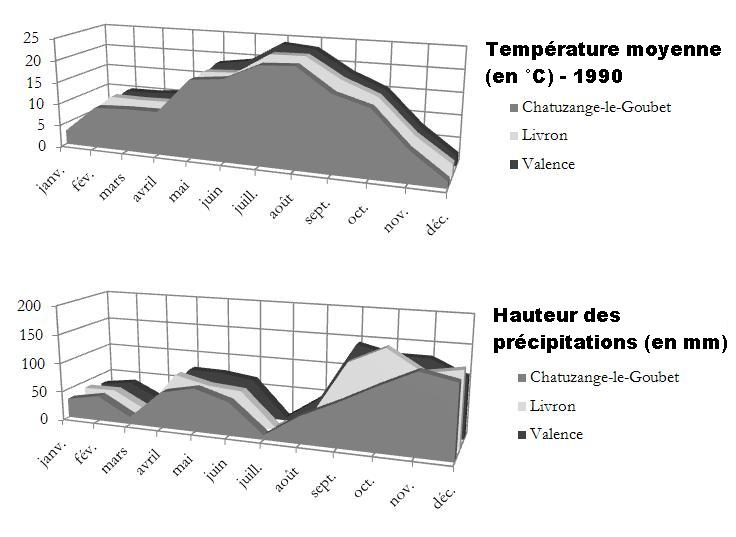
Temperature and rainfall curves of Valence in 1990

Valence enjoys a humid subtropical climate, whose main characteristic is an almost constant wind which blows and dries the Rhône corridor. Dubbed the "mistral" when it comes from the north, it brings good weather and coolness in the summer, but an impression of freezing cold in winter. When it comes from the south, it usually announces the arrival of stormy disturbances. It is then called le vent du midi ou le vent des fous [the midi wind or the uncaring wind] because, for some people, it makes the atmosphere painful to bear, especially in the summer.

The climate is semi-continental with Mediterranean influences. The Gotheron weather station of Saint-Marcel-lès-Valence, located 6 kilometres (3.7 mi) from the centre of Valence, recorded an average temperature of 12.3 °C and 886 millimetres (34.9 in) of precipitation over the period from 1966 to 2004. The annual sunshine in Valence is 2,500 hours/year (average 1970–1994). However, there are large variations from one year to another, depending on the dominant influence (in turn Mediterranean and semi-continental). During the period from 1994 to 2004, the following years were remarkable: Lack of sunshine in 1996 (1,712 hours), low precipitation (572 millimetres (22.5 in)) and high temperatures in 1997, significant rainfall in 1999 (1,049 millimetres (41.3 in)) and in 2002 (1,257 millimetres (49.5 in)). There was significant sunshine (approx. 2,500 hours) from 1999 to 2002, accompanied by higher than average temperatures. Frost in April 2003 which affected peach production, followed by a summer heatwave in 2003, with exceptional sunshine for the year (2,781 hours), and a rainfall deficit in 2004 (722 millimetres (28.4 in)).

Valence is located in the Rhône Valley where the wind regime is regular, both from the south (mistral) and north. Adding in the course of the Rhône which is linear from Lyon to Valence, this circumstance has allowed navigable sailing on the Rhône from Valence.

Climate data for Valence (1997–2020 normals, extremes 1997–present)
Month	Jan	Feb	Mar	Apr	May	Jun	Jul	Aug	Sep	Oct	Nov	Dec	Year
Record high °C (°F)	19.2 (66.6)	21.5 (70.7)	25.0 (77.0)	30.9 (87.6)	33.6 (92.5)	39.2 (102.6)	39.9 (103.8)	40.9 (105.6)	33.6 (92.5)	29.5 (85.1)	23.1 (73.6)	18.5 (65.3)	40.9 (105.6)
Mean daily maximum °C (°F)	8.0 (46.4)	9.8 (49.6)	14.6 (58.3)	18.3 (64.9)	22.2 (72.0)	27.0 (80.6)	29.4 (84.9)	28.9 (84.0)	24.4 (75.9)	18.9 (66.0)	12.3 (54.1)	8.4 (47.1)	18.5 (65.3)
Daily mean °C (°F)	4.5 (40.1)	5.5 (41.9)	9.2 (48.6)	12.5 (54.5)	16.4 (61.5)	20.5 (68.9)	22.6 (72.7)	22.2 (72.0)	18.3 (64.9)	14.1 (57.4)	8.5 (47.3)	5.0 (41.0)	13.3 (55.9)
Mean daily minimum °C (°F)	1.0 (33.8)	1.1 (34.0)	3.8 (38.8)	6.7 (44.1)	10.5 (50.9)	14.1 (57.4)	15.9 (60.6)	15.5 (59.9)	12.3 (54.1)	9.4 (48.9)	4.8 (40.6)	1.7 (35.1)	8.1 (46.6)
Record low °C (°F)	−14.7 (5.5)	−10.9 (12.4)	−11.7 (10.9)	−4.3 (24.3)	1.0 (33.8)	5.0 (41.0)	8.3 (46.9)	6.6 (43.9)	3.9 (39.0)	−4.3 (24.3)	−7.5 (18.5)	−11.6 (11.1)	−14.7 (5.5)
Average precipitation mm (inches)	56.8 (2.24)	46.6 (1.83)	53.7 (2.11)	74.3 (2.93)	88.8 (3.50)	57.2 (2.25)	54.5 (2.15)	68.3 (2.69)	82.7 (3.26)	123.7 (4.87)	109.4 (4.31)	57.9 (2.28)	873.9 (34.41)
Average precipitation days (≥ 1.0 mm)	7.5	6.5	8.1	8.4	8.7	6.1	5.9	6.3	5.5	8.3	9.1	7.8	88.0
Mean monthly sunshine hours	84.3	118.1	172.6	209.9	220.0	254.9	300.2	276.5	218.6	146.8	111.9	88.2	2,202
Source 1: Meteociel
Source 2: Infoclimate (sun at Bourg-lès-Valence 2012–2020)

=== Vegetation ===
The vegetation in the plain of Valence is mid-European with a supra-Mediterranean floor (pedunculate oak, oak found in the coldest places, and thickets of hornbeam) mingled with thermophilic species such as downy oak, or even evergreen oaks on exposed slopes with draining soils. Found also in the south of the Drôme Valley where the Mediterranean influence finally prevails (20 kilometres (12 mi) to the South) are spontaneous populations of thyme, lavender, Euphorbia characias, Spanish broom (Genista hispanica), cane of Provence (Arundo donax), as well as Aleppo pines on the western face of the massif of Crussol. Due to the exposure and the nature of the soil, the Ardèche hills offer landscapes of garrigue and Mediterranean Oak (Quercus ilex) from Tournon which is located 22 kilometres (14 mi) north of Valence (hills of Cornas, Château de Crussol and Soyons). The hills (mostly limestone) have a double vegetation: Mediterranean on the southern side and Sub-continental on the northern side.

Formerly, the cultivation of olive trees was previously on the well-exposed heights of Tain-l'Hermitage (19 kilometres (12 mi) to the north), but they were replaced by the culture of the vine at first, and then by that of apricot, peach and other fruits which are still very present in the region, even though more than 7,000 hectares (17,000 acres) of fruits (mainly apricots, cherries, peaches and kiwis) disappeared from the Drôme landscapes due to an outbreak of sharka and a bacterial infection forcing wilt since 2003.

== Transport ==
The central railway station of Valence is the Gare de Valence-Ville, located just south of the town centre. The station offers connections to Lyon, Grenoble, Avignon, Gap and several regional destinations. In 2001 the Gare de Valence TGV opened along with the LGV Méditerranée, a high-speed rail line extending south from Valence to Marseille. The station is only 1 kilometre (1 mi) south of the end of the LGV Rhône-Alpes, giving Valence much shorter journey times to northern destinations as well, with a journey to Paris taking 2h11. The TGV station is located 10 km northeast of the town.

=== Road network ===
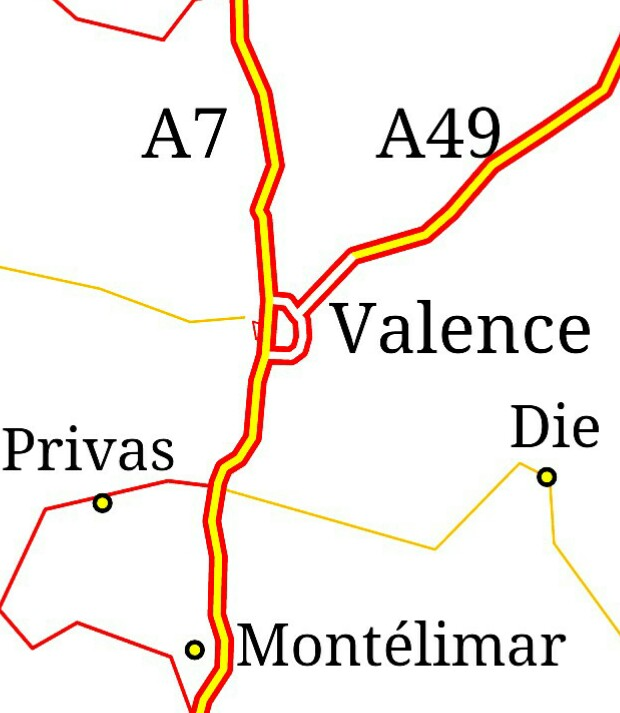
Location of the A7 and A49 autoroutes in Valence.

The city occupies a key position, at the centre of the Rhône Valley. Located on a crossroads of road networks, it is known to be a point of passage (cf. the Valence Autoroute Area) of the holidaymakers who head to the Côte d'Azur. The A7 autoroute (commonly known as the autoroute du soleil [motorway of the sun]) connects it to Lyon (100 kilometres (62 mi) to the north), Avignon (120 kilometres (75 mi) to the south), then to Marseille (220 kilometres (140 mi) south). The A49 autoroute connects it to Grenoble (95 kilometres (59 mi) to the northeast). The A41 autoroute connects it to Savoy (Chambéry and Annecy; 158 kilometres (98 mi) and 206 kilometres (128 mi) respectively) and Geneva (Switzerland) 245 kilometres (152 mi) to the northeast (via the A49).

On the other hand, relations with the cities of the Massif Central (Le Puy-en-Velay and Clermont-Ferrand) are more difficult as the roads are very winding. For example, the shortest route to reach Saint-Étienne passes through the Col de la République (ex-RN 82) at 1,161 metres (3,809 ft) altitude.

==== Underground project of the A7 ====
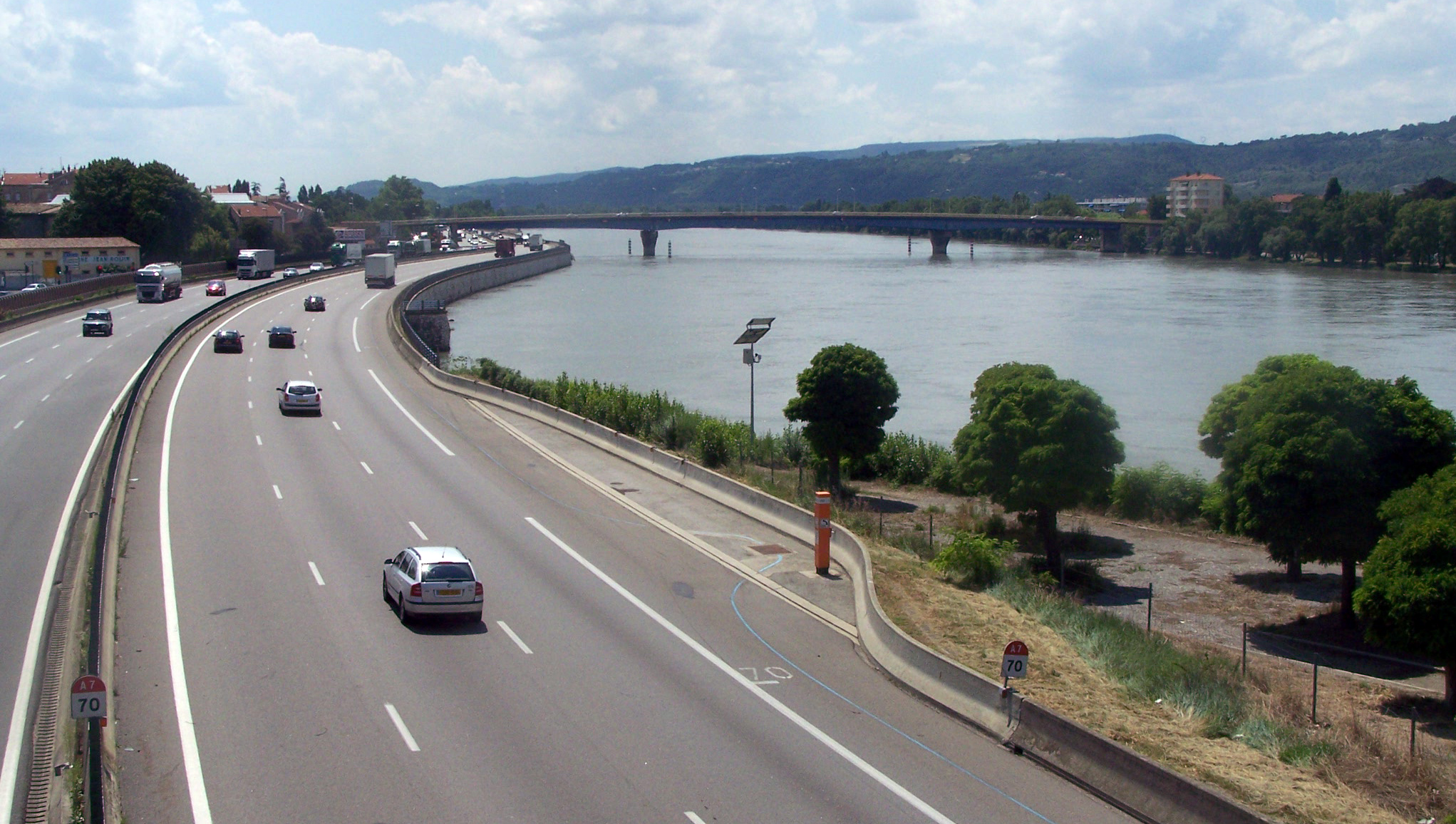
The A7 at the northern entrance to Valence, looking southbound.

In Valence, the A7 autoroute runs along the Rhône and thus crosses the city by cutting the river. An underground project of the autoroute up to the city is being studied.

The city of Valence was cut off from its river during the construction of the A7 motorway in the 1960s. The idea is born to bury the fast axis semi-covered trenches over a distance of about 1.5 kilometres (0.93 mi). This project to bury the motorway should make the banks of the Rhône available to Valence. However, the project would not be completed prior to at least 2025. The studies, which will be soon carried out, should enable a decision on the exact length of motorway involved, the technical choices and the financial cost. According to a preliminary study, the construction costs should culminate in an amount of €500 million, of which the cost will be shared between the State, the company Vinci Autoroutes, the department of Drôme and the city of Valence.

==== Valence ring road ====
The périphérique (ring road) of Valence consists of the A7 autoroute, Route nationale 7 and the Route nationale 532. It is located on the European routes E15 (A7) and E713 (RN 532).

Forming a half-loop, the Valence ring road covers a little more than 22 kilometres (14 mi) and connects the commune of Bourg-lès-Valence to the north (up to the toll of Valence Nord) in the city quarter of Fontlozier to the south (to the toll of Valence Sud exit), thus bypassing the major part of the city whilst ensuring the city is served to the east. It also allows easy access to the Valence TGV station in the north, by the RN 532. The ring road of Valence features motorway except in two singular points. The portion of the A7 autoroute in the centre is the legacy of the 1960s when the city turned back to its river. It is even doubled by urban roads, the D2007N.

Plans to form a complete loop, connecting the current ring road to a western bypass of Valence, on the right bank of the Rhône, are under consideration. The east ring road is of more recent design and it ensures the continuity of the RN 7, which offers a free alternative to the A7. This section also provides the extension of the A49 autoroute right to Valence. A road-doubling project of the A7 and A49 autoroutes was considered to relieve the ring road of its transit traffic but was abandoned, even though this axis was granted to the society of the Autoroutes du Sud de la France (ASF) and acquisitions had been completed.

The west bypass is gradually emerging and it relates directly to the department of Ardèche. It is materialised by a second bridge (Lônes Bridge) on the Rhône (D 96 and D 534) coming to relieve the Mistral Bridge located in the city centre. This bypass is to develop because it is located in the core trunk with the D86, the main axis of the right bank of the Rhône. The bypass of the communes of Guilherand-Granges, Saint-Péray and Cornas is programmed, which ensures its realisation by 2025. It will then require the construction of a third bridge over the Rhône in the north of the metropolitan area (in Bourg-lès-Valence) to complete the ring road that will then form a complete loop: This project is at the stage of preliminary studies and it seems that a passage on the present dam of the CNR is retained in order to minimise the cost.

=== The bridges of Valence ===
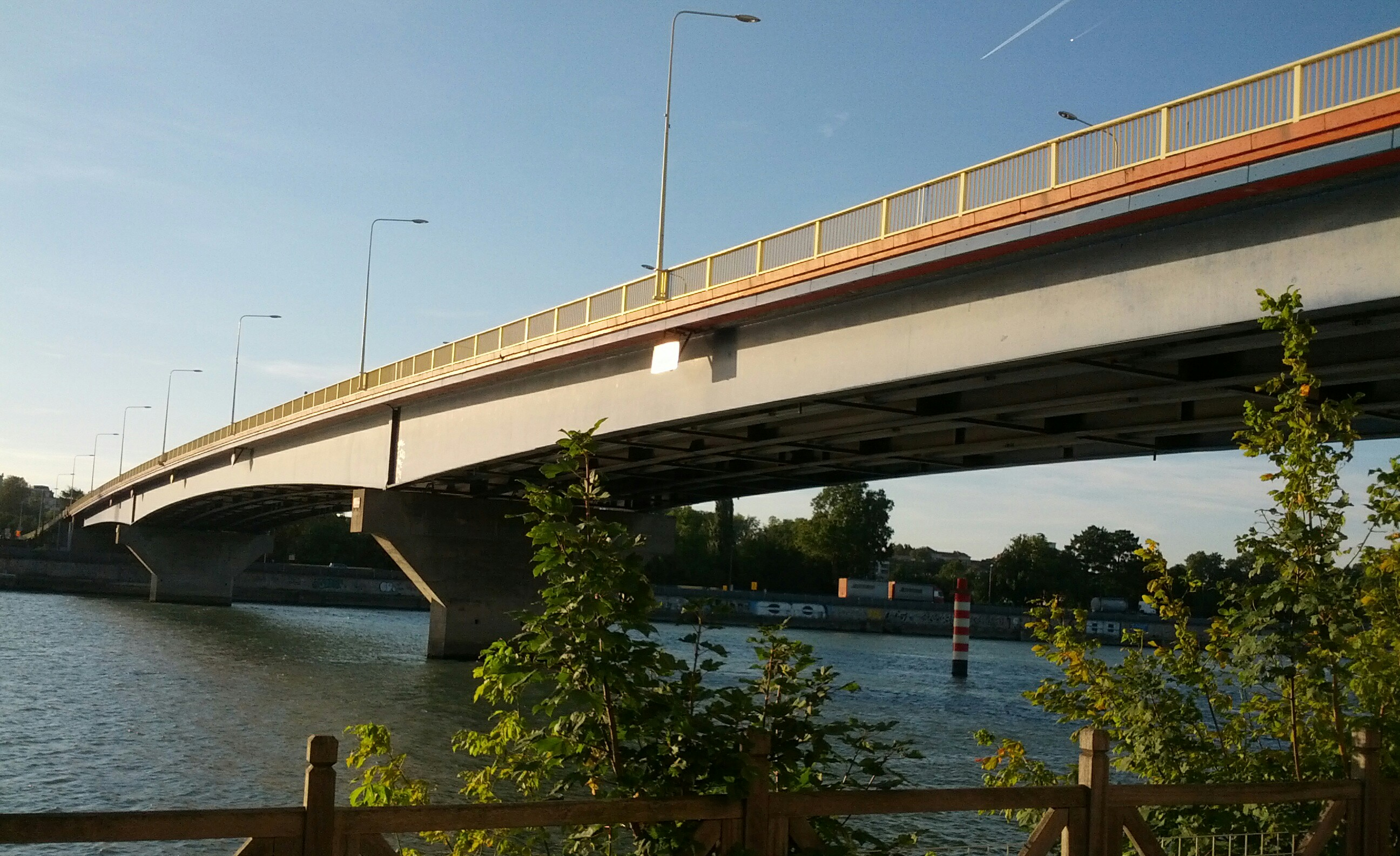
Frédéric Mistral Bridge.

During antiquity, the existence of a bridge providing, as in Vienne, the link between the two shores, is likely. Indeed, as early as 1388, the toponym "Pont Péri" [Péri Bridge] is carried by a sector of the quarter of Basse-Ville lying in the extension of the east-west axis of the ancient city. In addition, A. Blanc would have discovered, still in this same extension, piles of oak, closer perhaps to a pier. He also mentioned the "tour de Constance" [Constance Tower], on the Valence shore, a construction already known in the Middle Ages and which bore all the floods of the Rhône. In any case, the existence of a link between the two banks is in no doubt and a crossing point could even have existed at the site of Valence from the prehistoric time. Whether or not that existed, this ancient bridge was not replaced until the nineteenth century.

The different successive bridges of Valence, in chronological order, are:

- The Seguin Bridge built from 1827 (two years after that of Tain-Tournon, which was the first bridge of this type installed in France) and delivered to traffic in 1830.
- The stone bridge, dating from 1905, destroyed 19 June 1940 by French engineers to slow the advance of the German troops. In August 1940, Rhone is again passable by boat and then a ferry to traille. A temporary Pigeaud bridge was then installed by the engineers. This bridge was again damaged on 18 August 1944 during a bombing by the Allied forces.
- A temporary suspended walkway installed in 1949 and which was in use until 1967.
- The Frédéric Mistral Bridge, completed in 1967, is still in service. It joins the commune of Guilherand-Granges (Ardèche) to the city centre of Valence (Drôme).
- Finally, the Lônes Bridge was inaugurated on 18 December 2004, located at the south of the city, is the "second bridge" of Valence, long expected to alleviate the problems of movement between the two banks of the Rhone. It connects the communes of Guilherand-Granges and Soyons (Ardèche) in the southern districts of Valence.

During long periods where no bridge was available, a reaction ferry could cross the Rhone River. On the right bank, in Guilherand-Granges, an old pile used by this ferry is still erect.

=== Public transport ===
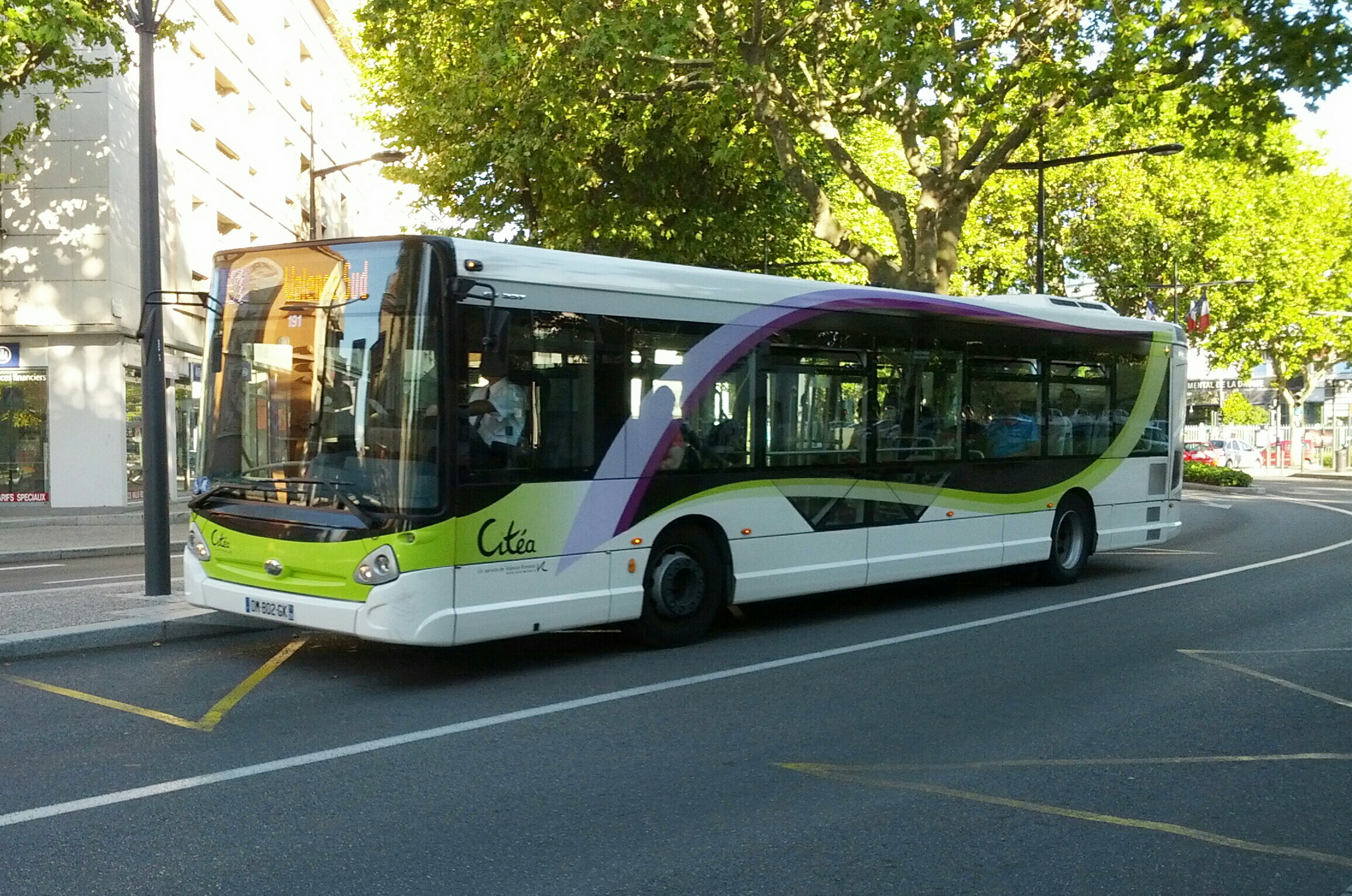
Citéa bus in Valence.

The region has a bus network called Citéa which covers the Valence agglomeration (located across the departments of Drôme and Ardèche) and the romano-peageoise town (about 20 kilometres (12 mi) north of Valence). The network is managed by Valence Romans Déplacements and controlled by the Communauté d'agglomération Valence Romans Agglo and its operation is entrusted to VTV (Véolia Transport Valence) from 2012 (the former CTAV network to July 2006). Given the large extent of the Citéa network, the latter is divided into two sectors, Valence and Romans-sur-Isère.

The territory covered by the network is 1,037 square kilometres (400 sq mi). It consists of 64 communes located in and around the towns of Valence and Romans-sur-Isère and is inhabited by nearly 220,000 people. Fourth urban network of the Rhône-Alpes region, it has 20 regular lines, over 200 stops and a fleet of 220 bus.

The Oura! card is a transport document which consists of a smartcard which allows not only to travel on any Citéa network (charging its transport tickets), but also to combine travel with other modes of transport in the region such as the TER Auvergne-Rhône-Alpes (Transport express régional), networks of transit of Saint-Étienne (STAS), Grenoble (TAG) or Lyon (TCL), or even rent-a-bike in free service.

=== Railway ===
Valence has two SNCF railway stations. (Gare)

==== Gare de Valence-Ville ====
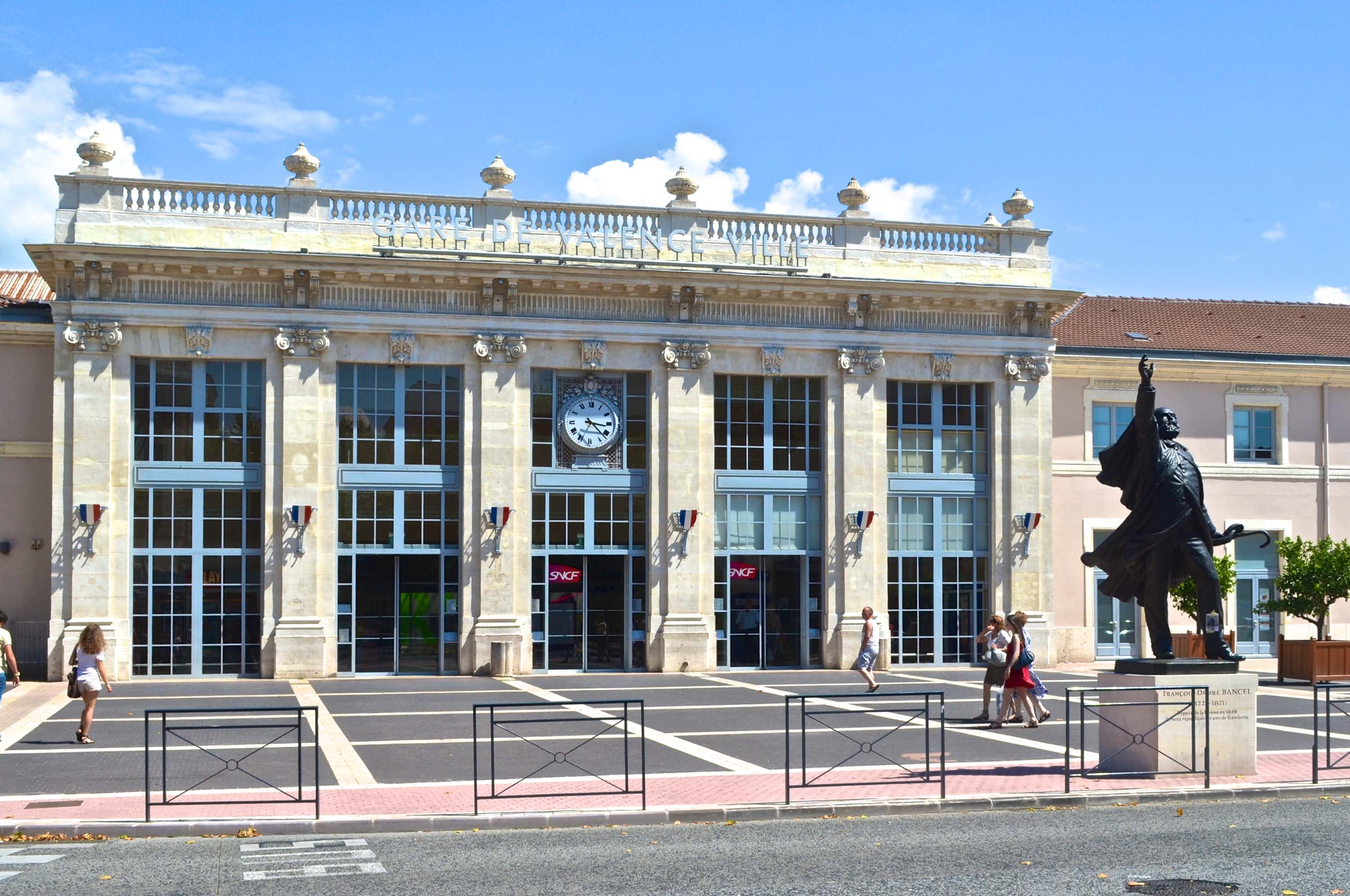
Façade of the gare de Valence-Ville. Statue of François-Désiré Bancel.

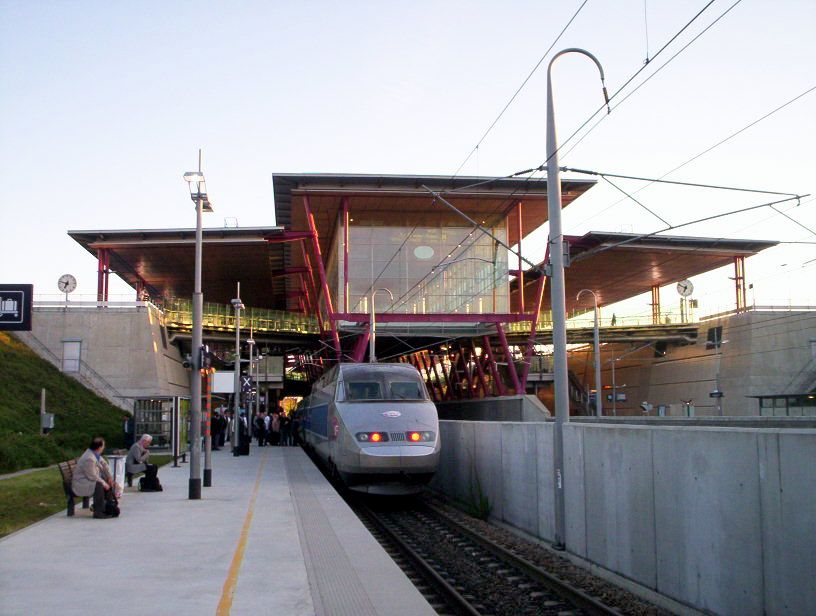
A train at the Valence-TGV railway station

Valence has two SNCF railway stations. Commissioned in 1865, the role of the Valence-Ville railway station has refocused on regional transport since the 2001 commissioning of the gare de Valence TGV, or simply Valence-TGV. It is the point of departure of the trains in the direction of Grenoble, Chambéry, Annecy and Geneva. Valence-Ville railway station was also the origin of the relationship which serves Livron, Crest, Die, Veynes-Dévoluy, Gap, Embrun and Briançon. The passenger building of Valence-Ville railway station has been in service in April 1866. It was designed by Louis-Jules Bouchot, architect of Napoleon III. The facade of the main body, in stone, is inspired by the Petit Trianon of Versailles. The main façade on the Rue du Pavilion Central has been registered as an historic monument since 11 October 1982.

==== Gare de Valence TGV ====
Valence TGV railway station, on the Lyon-Marseilles LGV Méditerranée line, is located 11 kilometres (6.8 mi) north-east of the city centre, in the commune of Alixan. Prior to its opening in 2001, the high speed TGV trains stopped in Valence-Ville railway station. Trains reached Paris in 2 hours 36 minutes. At the opening of the TGV station, a service of fifty TGVs per day was planned with eight of these TGVs continuing to serve Valence-Ville. Valence TGV station rail connections regularly connect to 35 cities, including Paris, Marseille, Lyon, Toulouse, Lille, Nice, Montpellier, Nantes, Le Havre, Reims, Avignon, Besançon, Strasbourg, Dijon, Barcelona and Brussels. In 2003, 60 daily TGVs served the station, with 1.8 million passengers. In 2008, the station was served by 58 daily TGVs, carrying 2.2 million passengers.

=== Inland waterway ===
The Port de l'Épervière contains 478 berths: It is the first river port of France. Built in 1973, at the initiative of the Chamber of commerce and industry of Drôme (CCI of Drôme), around a pool of 44,000 square metres (470,000 sq ft), it is included in a leisure park of 17 hectares (42 acres). The quality of the services offered allowed it to obtain the blue flag of Europe, in 2005.

Created in 1978 and operated by the CCI of Drôme, the river port of trade in the Drôme (more often called Port of Valence) is located for its part, on the territory of the commune of Portes-lès-Valence, just to the south of the city of Valence. It spread over 41 hectares (100 acres) and has in addition to the port itself, an industrial zone with 9 hectares (22 acres) of area of warehouses, including customs, a grain terminal, a 'wood' centre, and the storage sheds (7,600 square metres (82,000 sq ft) all products). Its strategic location on the Rhône (in the heart of the Rhône-Alpes region, close to Isère, Savoy and Switzerland) allows it to serve the countries of the Mediterranean Basin and the Middle East. As of July 2013, the Compagnie Nationale du Rhône (CNR) began a campaign of work, with a cost of €14 million, to develop the port to make it a place of exchange at the European level.

=== Air ===
Nearby airports
Name	Destinations	Distance
Valence-Chabeuil	France	5 kilometres (3.1 mi)
Grenoble-Isère	Europe	80 kilometres (50 mi)
Lyon-Saint-Exupéry	Europe, Africa, North America	114 kilometres (71 mi)

Valence-Chabeuil Airport, located in the commune of Chabeuil, is co-managed by the General Council of the Drôme and the Chamber of commerce and industry of Drôme. It is open to commercial national traffic, to private aircraft, using IFR and VFR but welcomes more regular routes since the decision of the Valence-Paris service, which has run since 1969.

The airport has three runways: one of 2,100 metres (6,900 ft) in concrete, and two smaller, 1,300 metres (4,300 ft) and 440 metres (1,440 ft). The 530 square metres (5,700 sq ft) terminal has two gateways for access to aircraft. The aircraft parking area is 16,000 square metres (170,000 sq ft). Passengers have at their disposal a 150-space car park and a hotel area. A flying club, as well as a helicopter company are installed at the airport.

Grenoble-Isère Airport is located 80 kilometres (50 mi) north-east of Valence along the A49 and offers flights to several European cities including London, Bristol, Dublin, Rotterdam and Warsaw. Lyon-Saint-Exupéry Airport is 114 kilometres (71 mi) north of Valence via the A7 motorway and offers international flights. The airport is considered to be the second airport in the province after Nice-Côte d'Azur Airport and connects Lyon with most capitals and major European cities. More than 100 cities are connected one or more times a week, some up to five times per day, such as London. In 2013, the Lyon-Saint-Exupéry airport processed more than 8.5 million passengers.

=== Self-service bicycles ===
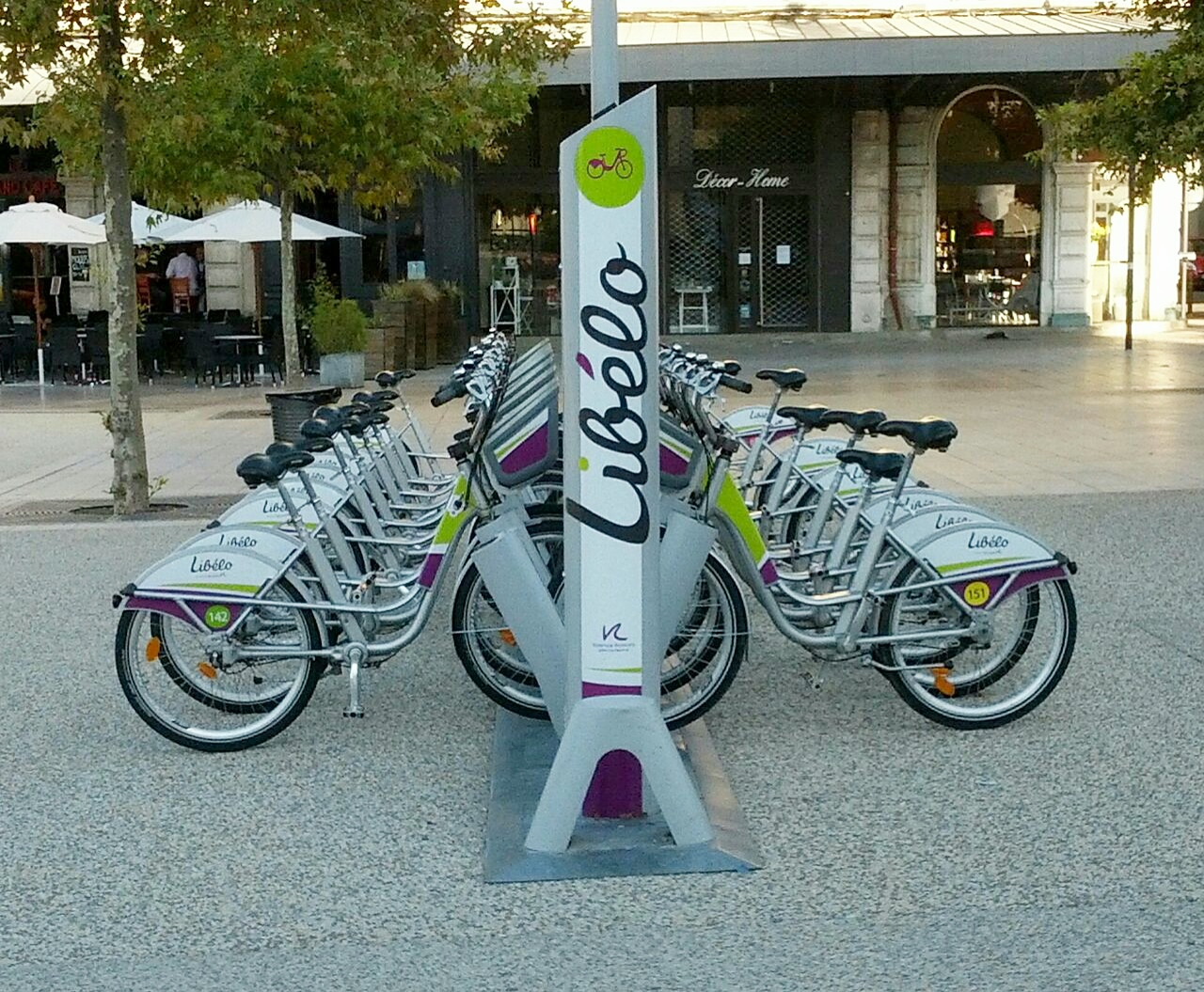
A Libélo bicycle station, in the city centre of Valence

Since 28 March 2010, the city has a system of self-service rent-a-bike and long-term hire called Libélo. It includes 160 bikes on the Smoove key concept spread over 18 then 20 stations and 200 rental bikes for long duration in Valence, Guilherand-Granges and Bourg-lès-Valence.

Unlike most other bike sharing systems, its management is not delegated to a business, or related to an advertising market but provided by the transport company of Valence (subsidiary of Transdev) in partnership with the Citéa transit network.

== Urban planning ==
=== Urban morphology ===
The old centre is based on the Roman foundation on a grid plan, occupation of the banks of the Rhone is sparse, probably because of instability. The orientation of the streets of the Roman city, orientation still quite widespread in the streets of the old town, is identical to those of the ancient cadastres of the surrounding countryside. The grid plan follows a dual orientation, varying neighbourhoods, the dual orientation which corresponds to two modules of this plan: One of about 360 Roman feet (107 metres (351 ft)), the other 420 feet, which sometimes breaks down into 120 feet spacing. This second module describes the angle of the Rue de l'Équerre; Place des Ormeaux exactly a square actus (i.e. a square with a side of 120 Roman feet); the Saint-Apollinaire Cathedral occupies two square actus. The presence of the Roman amphitheatre near the Porte Neuve (New Gate) is detectable only in the design of the streets of the cadastre from 1807.

The first alluvial terrace, at 120–125 metres (394–410 ft) altitude, was fully occupied by the western part of the communal territory in the 1960s. The city of Valence then expanded eastward, on the Riss terrace, at an altitude of approximately 150 metres (490 ft). To the south, the Lautagne plateau, at an altitude of 180 metres (590 ft), determines a narrow groove between this advance from the terrace of la Léore and the Rhône, which has limited the development of the city in that direction. At the end of the 20th century, the city was again cut off from the Rhône by the construction of the A7 autoroute. Port areas are alone in the south towards Portes-lès-Valence. The Valence agglomeration stretches on the right bank of the Rhône, but is limited by the edge of the Vivarais plateau. However, it includes the communes of Guilherand-Granges, Saint-Péray, Cornas and Soyons.

To facilitate the expansion of the town to the east, a large expressway was built (it is used by the RN7), where the Valence-Chabeuil Airport has been in operation since 1969.

=== Quarters ===
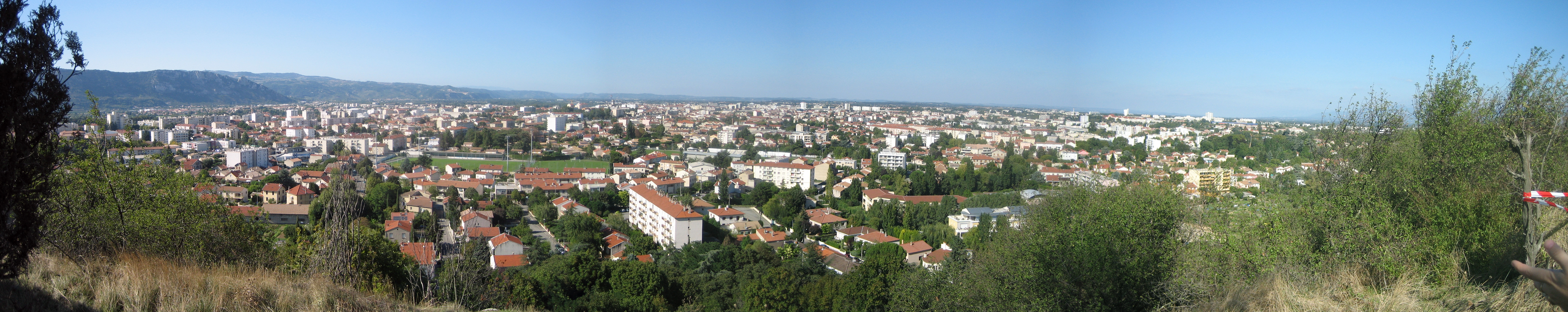
View of the southern districts of Valence from the plateau of Lautagne

The city of Valence is made of twenty quarters (with an average of 3,500 people per quarter). They are all different from the other: The northern quarters are rather popular and residential (Polygone, Fontbarlettes, le Plan and la Chamberlière) and even rural (Thodure), while the southern quarters are generally inhabited by the middle class and pensioners (Fontlozier, Hugo-Provence, Laprat, les Baumes, Mannet, Valence Sud and Lautagne), although there is a popular district (Valensolles), the central quarters are commercial and animated (Centre-ville, Gare, Victor Hugo) and also for tourists during the summer (Vieux Valence, Basse ville, l'Épervière) and the east quarters are areas with residential character (Baquet, Grand Charran, Petit Charran, Châteauvert, Danton and Briffaut), however the Martins quarter is rather rural.

Some districts are represented by a "Quarter Committee", which makes for a lively micro-local fabric. A Quarter Committee is an association of people who play a role with regard to public institutions, and who allow an exchange of information between people and municipal services. In this way, residents can participate in the direction of development projects of their quarters according to their aspirations.

To avoid a trip to the city hall, the city of Valence has created five city hall branches in outlying quarters. The mayoral branches of Fontbarlettes, le Plan, Centre-Ville, Valence Sud and the Chamberlière are placed at the disposal of the inhabitants and are in charge of certain administrative services delegated by the Central Council.

=== Housing ===
In 2009, the total number of dwellings in the municipality was 34,661, while it was 32,376 in 1999.

Among this housing, 88.4% were primary residences, 1.0% of secondary residences and 10.6% vacant housing. These dwellings were 24.1% detached houses and 74.7% of apartments.

The proportion of primary residences, as properties of their occupants, was 43.1%, up slightly from 1999 (41.1%). The share of social housing (empty rented HLM) was 16.5% against 18.8%, their number having dropped: 5,059 against 5,439.

Concerning social housing, there are several organisations which are the Public Housing Office of Valence (OPH) and Housing Development of Drôme (DAH) who construct, maintain and manage social housing throughout the city and in the Valence agglomeration, most are located in so-called working-class quarters. As for the grants of the OPH, they come from the city of Valence, the Drôme department, the region and the State. Those of DAH come mainly from the department.

=== Development projects ===
The major projects of the municipality do not yet concern the city centre, even if they have the merit of addressing the three terraces which line the city: the first terrace concerns Valence-le-Haut (quarters of le Plan and Fontbarlettes), the second concerns the centre and the south, and the third the banks of the Rhône.

One of the city's major projects is the reclamation of the banks, disfigured by the passage of the A7 motorway over 1.4 kilometres (0.87 mi). When he was Mayor of Valence, Member of Parliament Patrick Labaune had defended a bypass with an eastern route. Thus advocating the "removal the A7", when elected, specifically a burial of the motorway in semi-covered trenches. The project would have been validated by the company of the Autoroutes du Sud de la France (ASF), but the mayor refuses for now to give a price, which would be some €500 million according to experts.

Other projects will be launched to create a 24 kilometres (15 mi) green route, on the banks, through the municipalities of Valence and Bourg-lès-Valence. In addition to a renovation of the tourist facilities on the site of the l'Épervière, the city wants to transform the Îles quartier into an ecodistrict, with positive energy housing. This project could lead to the removal of family gardens there. However, there is a building plot and the gardens will be resettled on fertile lands of the plateau of Lautagne.

Like the Îfles quarter, a new quarter is planned in the south of the city on the brownfield site of the Hugo-Provence area, in place of the former Cime building (destroyed in 2013), with the construction of 200 housing units (half social, half private), shops and a hotel. The first part should be delivered before 2015.

One of the major issues of the municipality is the opening up of the Hauts-de-Valence, which is subject to a program of urban renewal of €117 million, jointly funded by the city and the National Agency for urban renewal (ANRU). It includes the demolition of 417 houses in the working-class districts of the Plan and Fontbarlettes and their reconstruction by the end of 2014 throughout the city. The project also includes an opening up and connection of these areas to the rest of the city. Shared public spaces will be created on Roosevelt and Kennedy boulevards.

At an estimated €100 million cost, the last big project supported by the city concerns the creation of a city of sports and culture on the former military wasteland of Latour-Maubourg. It will host the new Jean-Pommier pool, a municipal exhibition hall, a media hub with the headquarters of the radio station France Bleu Drôme Ardèche and the Le Dauphiné libéré newspaper, and finally a centre of higher education. The renovated buildings will house a students' halls, Maestris private school, nursing school and the regional school of fine arts of Valence, which has created a public establishment of cultural co-operation with that of Grenoble. In addition to the space of the wasteland, the city will have the land released by the relocation of the prison, in 2015. It has also launched a study to establish a new palais des congrès in the area.

== Politics and administration ==
=== Municipal administration ===
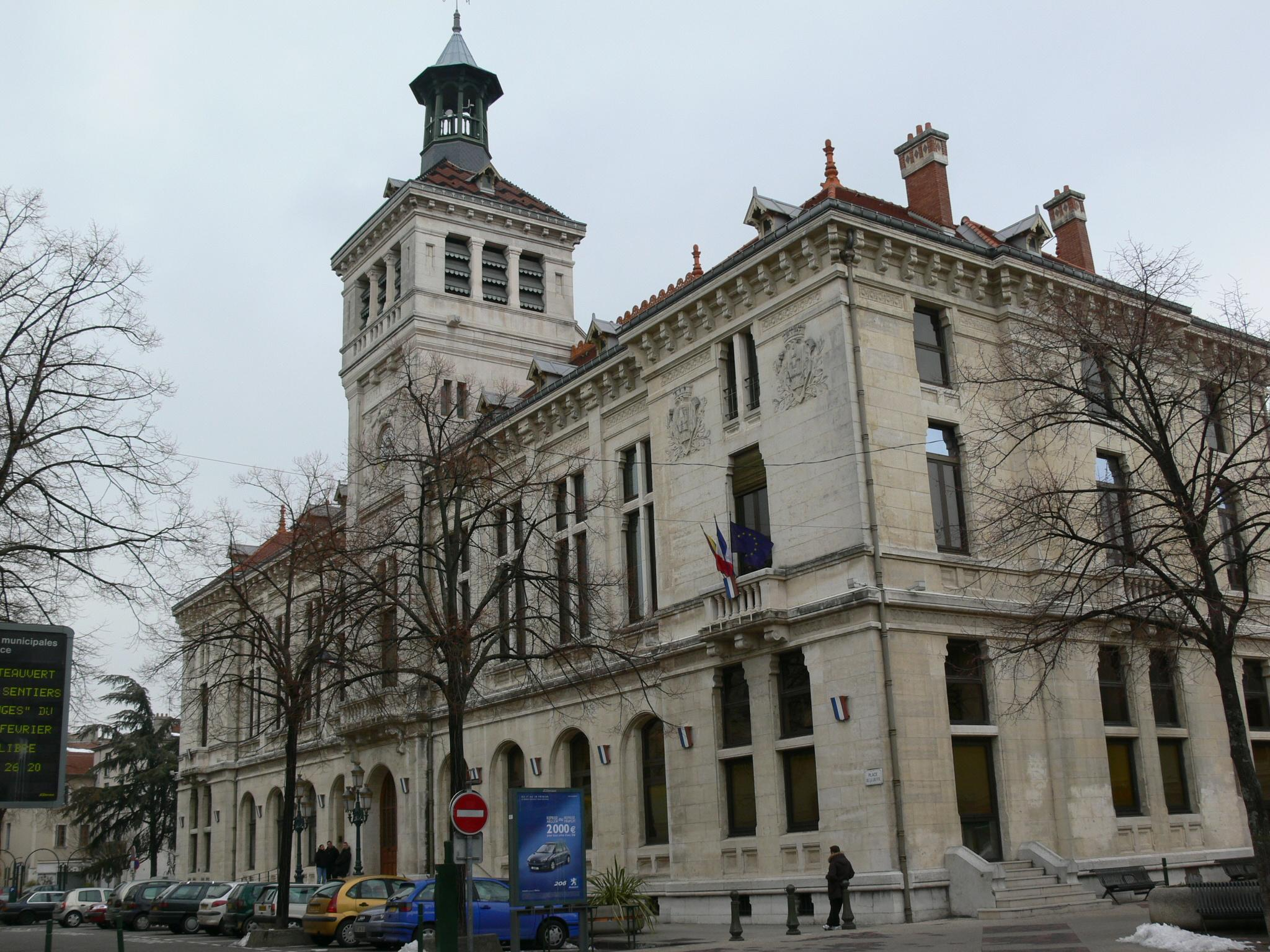
The Hôtel de Ville (city hall)

The city of Valence is a territorial collectivity administered by a municipal council which is the deliberative assembly of the commune and which aims to regulate by its deliberations the business of the municipality. The municipal council elects the mayor. As for any commune whose population is between 60,000 and 79,999 inhabitants, this council has 49 members (mayor, 14 deputies and 34 municipal councillors) elected by direct universal suffrage for a renewable term of six years.

The current mayor of Valence is Nicolas Daragon, a member of the UMP elected in 2014. The current council was elected in April 2014.

The Hôtel de Ville (city hall) was designated a monument historique by the French government in 2018.

Following the 2014 municipal elections, the composition of the municipal council of Valence is as follows:

Municipal Council of Valence (mandature 2014–2020).
List	Party	Leader	Seats	Status
"Générations Valence Demain" [Tomorrow's generations of Valence]	UMP-UDI	Nicolas Daragon	38	Majority
"J'aime Valence" [I like Valence]	PS	Alain Maurice	8	Opposition
"Réussir Ensemble Valence" [Valence succeeding together]	EELV	Patrick Royannez	2	Opposition
"Oui ! Valence Bleu Marine" [Yes! Valence Navy]	FN-RBM	Richard Fritz	1	Opposition

==== List of mayors ====
List of mayors of Valence during the Ancien Régime

List of mayors of Valence during the Ancien Régime
Start	End	Name	Party	Other details
1694		Jean-Pierre Bachasson		

List of mayors of Valence from the French Revolution to the Liberation

List of mayors of Valence from 1790 to 1944
Start	End	Name	Party	Other details
...				
...				
1795	1801	Jean-Pierre de Montalivet		Count of Montalivet
...				
...				
28 June 1815	26 July 1815	Jean-Pierre Bleizac		
27 July 1815	16 October 1816	François " Frédéric " de Plan		Marquis de Sieyès de Veynes
17 October 1816	9 July 1817	Jean-Pierre Bleizac		
10 July 1817	10 September 1830	Venance Sylvain Forcheron		
11 September 1830	7 July 1836	Nicolas Delacroix		
8 July 1836	20 September 1836	Calixte Bonnet		
21 September 1836	7 July 1843	Nicolas Delacroix		
8 July 1843	13 September 1843	Calixte Bonnet		
14 September 1843	11 November 1846	Eugène Alexandre Ithier		
12 November 1846	9 January 1849	Joseph Antoine Ferlay		Lawyer
6 March 1874	17 May 1874	Louis-Félix Dupré de Loire		
23 September 1894	9 May 1896	Jean-François Malizard		
10 May 1896	9 October 1919	Henri Chalamet	Republican Union	Lawyer
10 October 1919	22 October 1928	Henri Perdrix	Radical-socialist	Carpentry contractor General Counsel; Senator of the Drôme
23 October 1928	2 February 1934	Jules Algoud		
3 February 1934	30 August 1944	René Pècherot		
31 August 1944	25 October 1947	Jean Buclon		

List of mayors of Valence since the Liberation
Start	End	Name	Party	Other details
26 October 1947	24 September 1957	Camille Vernet	Radical-Socialist	
25 September 1957	26 March 1971	Jean Perdrix	Radical-Socialist	
27 March 1971	17 March 1977	Roger Ribadeau-Dumas	RPR	
18 March 1977	18 June 1995	Rodolphe Pesce	PS	General Counsel
19 June 1995	7 April 2004	Patrick Labaune	UMP	Regional Counsel
8 April 2004	21 March 2008	Léna Balsan	UMP	
22 March 2008	4 April 2014	Alain Maurice	PS	Lawyer
5 April 2014	In progress	Nicolas Daragon	UMP	General Counsel

=== Cantons ===
Capital of the department of Drôme, the city of Valence is divided into four cantons, of which it is chef-lieu.

The cantonal division of Valence has evolved since the creation of the departments in 1790. Established in 1801, the canton of Valence was divided into two in 1964, and then three in 1973 and finally into four in 1984. The cantonal redistricting of 2015 led to the creation of four new cantons each containing a fraction of the commune of Valence and whole communes.

The cantons of Valence
Canton of Valence-1 ~ Canton of Valence-2 ~ Canton of Valence-3 ~ Canton of Valence-4
Cantons of the Drôme department

=== Intercommunality and intercommunal trade unions ===
Valence is the largest city of Valence Romans Agglo, an agglomeration community with 51 communes of the region. It is responsible for several areas of skills, including local public transport, economic development, sanitation and environment, sports complexes and public libraries management.

== Population ==
=== Demography ===
Its inhabitants are called Valentinois in French. In 2018, the municipality had 64,726 inhabitants. Its agglomeration had 132,556 inhabitants (10 communes, of which 3 in Ardèche) and its metropolitan area had 254,254 inhabitants (71 communes across Drôme and Ardèche).

Historical population

Year	Pop.	±% p.a.
1793	6,633	—
1800	7,532	+1.83%
1806	8,212	+1.45%
1821	9,805	+1.19%
1831	10,406	+0.60%
1836	10,967	+1.06%
1841	13,407	+4.10%
1846	13,901	+0.73%
1851	16,122	+3.01%
1856	16,875	+0.92%
1861	18,711	+2.09%
1866	20,142	+1.48%
1872	20,668	+0.43%

Year	Pop.	±% p.a.
1876	23,220	+2.95%
1881	24,502	+1.08%
1886	24,761	+0.21%
1891	25,283	+0.42%
1896	26,212	+0.72%
1901	26,946	+0.55%
1906	28,112	+0.85%
1911	28,706	+0.42%
1921	28,654	−0.02%
1926	30,964	+1.56%
1931	34,275	+2.05%
1936	36,582	+1.31%
1946	40,020	+0.90%

Year	Pop.	±% p.a.
1954	41,470	+0.45%
1962	52,532	+3.00%
1968	62,358	+2.90%
1975	68,604	+1.37%
1982	66,356	−0.47%
1990	63,437	−0.56%
1999	64,260	+0.14%
2007	64,803	+0.11%
2012	62,481	−0.73%
2017	63,714	+0.39%
2023	64,458	+0.19%

From 1962 to 1999: Population without double counting; for the years following: municipal population.
Source: Ldh/EHESS/Cassini until 1999 then INSEE

== Society ==
=== Worship and humanist associations ===
Valence has two Catholic parishes, which depend on the Diocese of Valence, Deanery of Valence: Notre-Dame-des-Peuples of Valence and Saint Émilien of Valence.

The Jewish community has a synagogue in Valence.

The Armenian community, comprising over 10% of the population, has its own church, Saint Sahag (Isaac) and in November 2017 launched the construction of an Armenian-language daily-school.

Protestants also have a place of worship in Valence, through the Reformed Church of France, as well as the Evangelical Protestant Church and the Salvation Army.

=== Cultural events and festivities ===
- Valence fête le printemps [Valence spring festival]: Celebrating agricultural productions
- Boulevards de chines [Boulevard of china]: Flea markets and antiques
- Festival de Valence [Festival of Valence]: Free concerts in the city
- Les Féeries d'Hiver [Winter extravaganza]: Show and Fireworks

== Health ==
Valence has two hospitals, a public and a private. Many health professionals are installed on the commune, including 58 physicians, 67 nurses, 80 physiotherapists. Since 2009, Valence is a member of the WHO city health network, through its commitments for the promotion of good nutrition practices, Valence is also very active in the National Programme of Health and Nutrition (PNNS).

=== Central Hospital of Valence ===
The Centre Hospitalier de Valence [Central Hospital of Valence] (CHV) employed 2,570 people in 2013. It includes all clinical specialties (medicine, Oncology, surgery, obstetrics and gynaecology, paediatrics, psychiatry, care and rehabilitation, long stay, etc.). It has a maternity hospital where approximately 2,326 babies (including 20.9% deliveries by caesarean section and 60.6% deliveries under epidural) are born each year. The Central Hospital of Valence has a capacity of 740 beds. In 2011, nearly 67,000 people were presented as emergencies; the operating block has practised more than 10,000 interventions, nearly 29 interventions per day. In the maternity ward of the hospital, over 2,000 children were born. The Woman-Mother-Child Centre welcomes paediatrics, neonatology and obstetrics, infant surgery, gynaecology and the hospitalisation units for woman and child. The Medical and Tumour Pathologies Centre welcomes gastro-enterology, haematology, oncology, haemovigilance, pulmonology – infectious diseases, dermatology, alcohol addiction, and palliative care. The Geriatrics and Rehabilitation Centre brings together the geriatric mobile team, the USLD, the EHPAD, the geriatric SSR, and rehabilitation. The Surgery and Anesthesia Centre block welcomes orthopaedics, ENT, the ophthalmology, gynecological surgery, urology, neurosurgery, anesthesia, and an operating room. The Medicine and Specialties Centre includes cardiology, neurology, department of medicine, multipurpose medicine and dietetics. After the opening of the radiology building, a surgical building of 263 beds and places opened its doors in June 2011.

=== Drôme Ardèche Private Hospital ===
The Hôpital Privé Drôme Ardèche [Drôme Ardèche Private Hospital] (HPDA) is a complex created in 2005 from the joining of the Clinique Pasteur [Pasteur clinic] (located on the neighboring commune of Guilherand-Granges) and the Clinique Générale de Valence [Valence General clinic] (located in the quarter of Chaffit in Valence). It has 361 beds and places spread across the two sites. Its Emergency Department, located on the site of Pasteur, is open 7 days a week and 24 hours a day. In 2013, the Drôme Ardèche Private Hospital staff consists of 150 doctors and liberal surgeons, 180 nurses, 140 caregivers, 20 midwives, 16 childcare auxiliaries, 110 other hospital workers and porters, 45 other paramedic personnel, and 80 administrative and technical personnel.

=== Emergency services and civil security ===
The firefighters of the Drôme department (SDIS 26) includes 2,735 staff (316 professional firefighters and 2,419 volunteers); its headquarters (which also houses the board of directors) is located at 235 Route de Montélier in Valence. Under the direction of Commander Laurent Blanchard, the firefighters of the Drôme took part in 28,551 interventions in 2013. The main rescue centre (known as "CSP", commonly referred to as the sapeurs-pompiers de Valence [firefighters of Valence]) is under the responsibility of Captain Fabien Thepaut. It is the most important centre of intervention of the department and is located at 57 Rue de Chantecouriol, Hugo-Provence Quarter in Valence. There are also seven assistance intervention centres (CIS) in the Valence agglomeration (CIS of Beaumont-lès-Valence, Chabeuil, Étoile-sur-Rhône, Montélier, Portes-lès-Valence, Saint-Marcel-lès-Valence and Saint-Péray).

The SAMU 26 is an emergency medical assistance service which has the mission to receive and treat emergency calls on the territory of Drôme. Its mission is to provide pre-hospital assistance to victims of accidents or sudden illnesses in critical condition.

== Education ==
=== School education ===
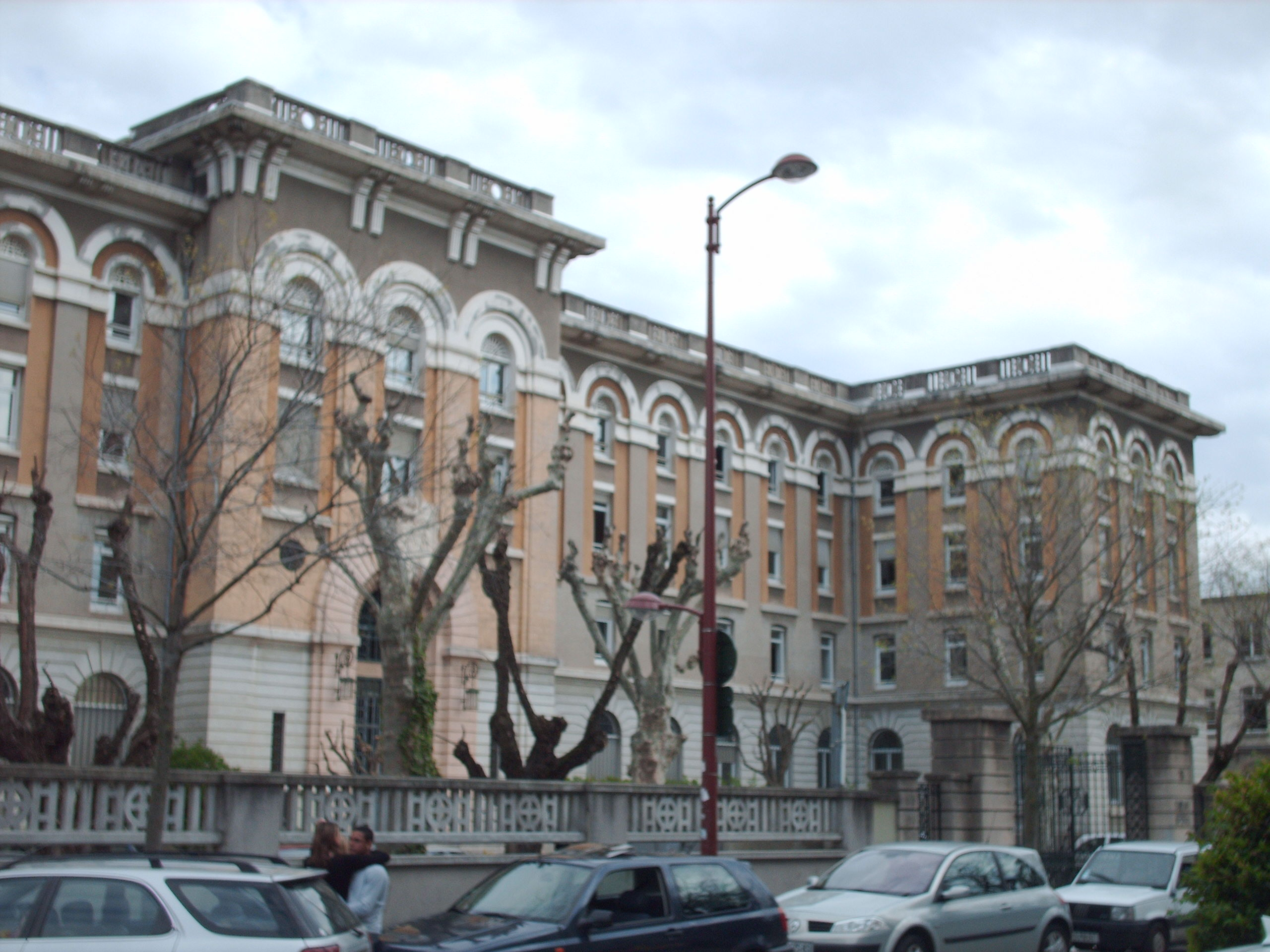
A view of the western façade of the Lycée privé catholique Montplaisir.

- 10 collèges (Paul-Valery, Camille-Vernet, Sainte-Anne, Jean-Zay, etc.)
- 4 classical lycées (Camille-Vernet [artistic options: Cinema, art, music, Russian], Institution Notre-Dame, Institution Saint-Victor, Émile Loubet [artistic options: Theatre, dance, Chinese])
- 6 vocational lycées (La Providence, Victor-Hugo, etc.)
- 1 lycée of technical training (Jules-Algoud industrial lycée)
- 1 tertiary versatile lycée
- 1 industrial technology lycée
- Montplaisir Catholic private lycée

=== Higher education ===
The city of Valence is now developing its high level educational role in the Drôme/Ardèche area. The Site de Valence is part of the Community Grenoble Alpes University (formerly UJF, UPMF, including the Institut universitaire de technologie, and Stendhal). Valence is also home to the INPG engineering school (ESISAR). Many other and more specialized schools are also located in Valence.

- Joseph Fourier University: science, technology, health, STAPS, ESPE
- Pierre Mendès-France University: IUT
- Stendhal University: letters, languages
- ESISAR (École nationale supérieure in advanced systems and networks) of Grenoble INP
- Lycée Camille-Vernet: CPGE scientific and economic
- Higher technology Institute Montplaisir: CPGE economic and trade
- Regional school of fine arts
- School of management and commerce (EGC)
- Institute for hospital nursing education
- La Poudrière – Animation film school
- Higher technology Institute Montplaisir (ISTM)

== Sport ==
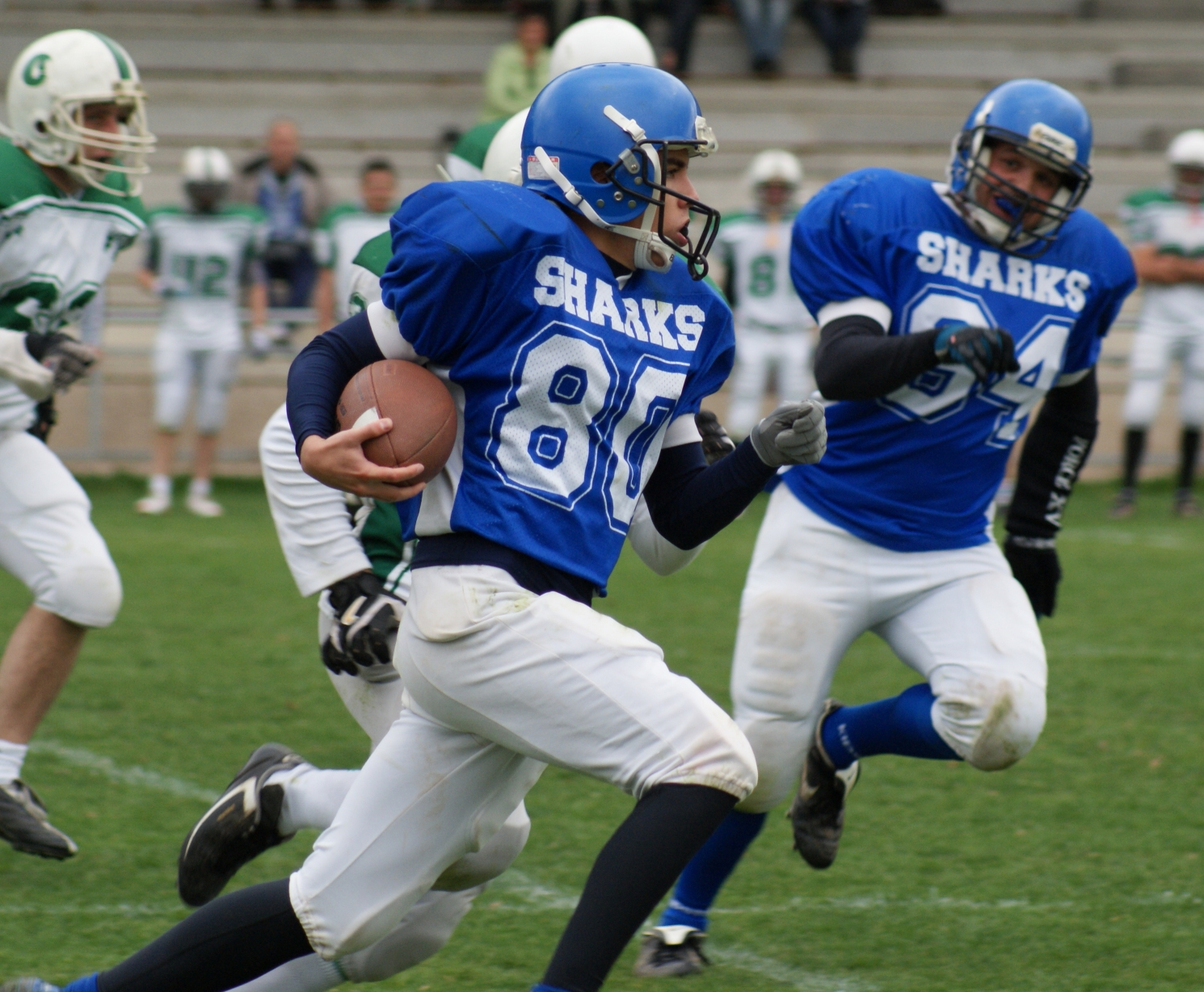
The Sharks de Valence, American football

- Basketball: Valence Bourg Basket is a basketball club created on 6 May 2011 and located in Bourg-lès-Valence.
- Cycling: Valence was finish city of the 11th stage of the 1996 Tour de France, with the victory of the Colombian José Jaime González. Valence will also be the finish for Stage 15 of the 2015 Tour de France on 19 July.
- American football: the Sharks de Valence, created in 2002, evolve in France's Division 3 Championship.
- Football: Association Sportive de Valence (ASV) replaced ASOA Valence, which went into judicial liquidation in August 2005, the new team plays in the CFA from the 2011–2012 season.
- Golf: The Golf Club de Valence covers approximately 50 hectares (120 acres) of woods and greenery in the commune of Charpey (east of the city); the place bears the name of Golf de Valence – St Didier, and offers a course of 18 holes with a length of 5,595 metres (6,119 yd), par 71. Situated in Bourg-lès-Valence, the Golf des Chanalets offers an 18-hole course, with a length of 5,893 metres (6,445 yd), par 71, and opens onto large 360° panoramas of the plain of Valence with the Rhône, Ardèche and Vercors summits.
- Handball: Valence Handball played in the Division 2 of the Championship of France from the 2012–2013 season.
- Ice hockey: The Lynx of Valence team was founded in 1976 and played in Division 2.
- Judo: The CSF Judo Valence club was established in 1950. It now has 164 licensees including 17 black belts. Three graduate teachers of state and two volunteer teachers supervise the youngest to most senior courses.
- Roller in-line hockey: Valence Roller Hockey has a team playing in the Championship of France N2 and counts an international junior among its players.
- Rugby union: Valence Romans Drôme Rugby plays in the Rugby Pro D2, the second tier professional league in France.
- Squash: The Squash Club de Valence has a team which plays in the championnat de France national 1 with flag-carrier Grégoire Marche, European champion junior and no. 79 world.
- The Georges Pompidou Stadium is the main stadium of Valence with a capacity of 14,380 places. It is also the stadium where the athletics competitions take place.
- Triathlon: Valence Triathlon has a men's team and a women's team which is in the French second division.
- Ken Shin Kan is a Japanese sword school which aims to promote and teach the techniques of Japanese sword are: naginata, iaido, chanbara, and kendo. The club has no less than 80 licensees of all disciplines.
- Valence ACE volleyball Club offers training in youth and adult recreation and competition volleyball. The club has more than 130 licensees.

== Economy ==
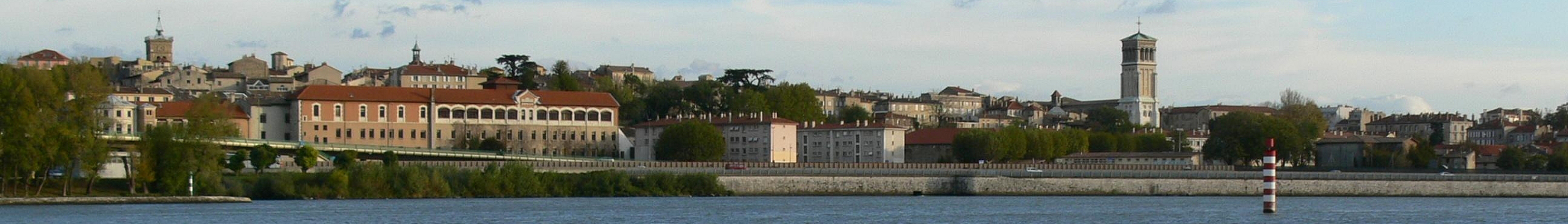
Panorama of Valence seen from the right bank of the Rhône, at Guilherand-Granges, in the territory of Ardèche.

The focal point of major north-south European routes and door to the Sillon Alpin for the east-west corridor in the direction of Italy and Switzerland, the territory of the Valence agglomeration has developed around innovative companies, offering a higher education, centres of excellence and an economic supply of land. The development of the economy of Valence is favoured by the proximity of cities such as Lyon and Geneva and, through transport routes, major European capitals.

The economic development of Valence was due to food processing, hi-tech with the presence of groups of electronics or aerospace, many SMEs and a university centre of importance of film and knowledge with the presence of animation studios internationally recognised for the quality of their productions.

The Valence agglomeration by its geographical position at the crossroads of the main European flows, contains the following infrastructure: The railway marshalling yard, the port of trade of Valence: River services and vessels along the Rhone by the canal from the Rhône to the Mediterranean and by access to the Freycinet northward, access to the A7 motorway and a branch towards the Isère and Italy (A49) a railway siding giving access to Europe-Mediterranean traffic and Italy.

Valence is the seat of the Chamber of commerce and industry of the Drôme, which manages the Port de l'Épervière, the port of Valence and Valence-Chabeuil Airport.

According to INSEE in 2005, the percentage of the distribution of the labour force by sector of activity was:

Active population by sectors
Agriculture	Industry	Construction	Services
0.9%	17.8%	4.8%	76.5%

- Food (fruits, vegetables, wines)
- Metallurgy
- Mechanical engineering
- Electronics / Electronic Banking / Automation

The industries of the city include metallurgical products, textiles, leather goods, jewelry and munitions, and it also serves as a processing and trade centre for the surrounding agricultural region.

Some of the big hi-tech companies settled here are considered leaders in their domains, among which are Thales (Former Thomson-CSF, electronic systems for avionics and defence), Crouzet/Schneider (Automatic systems), SAGEM (former Alcatel space (Aerospatial systems)), Ascom Monetel (Automatic tax payment systems), etc.

The Maison Pic is a world-renowned three Michelin star restaurant and hotel, established in 1889.

=== Areas of economic activities ===
The commercial area of the Couleures has approximately eighty public brands in the fields of equipment, the home, sport, and the individual.

The two sectors of Briffaut (east and west), in east Valence, count 320 companies (200 on the sector of Briffaut East including an automotive hub combining various concessions and associated services; and 120 businesses of Briffaut West).

The technoparks include one hundred companies.

The plateau of Lautagne, located at the south of the city, brings together 40 technology companies with high added value. An extension of 30 hectares (74 acres) was scheduled the second half of 2008.

The Auréats zone is the oldest industrial site in Valence, it covers 120 hectares (300 acres) and 180 companies (on the Valence side).

The Cime activity centre, housed in the former premises of Tézier, gathers 86 service enterprises. The site is currently undergoing conversion work.

=== Businesses and shops ===
At the end of 2015, 8,183 establishments were installed on the commune of Valence: 71% in the tertiary trade, and 16% of establishments in public administration (school, health, etc.). Industry represents only 4% of establishments in the commune. 92% of its establishments employ less than 10 employees.

=== Income and taxation of the population ===
The declared taxable average net income was €19,609, in 2009. Only 46% of households were taxed the same year.

The taxation of households and businesses in Valence in 2010
Tax	Communal	Intercommunal	Departmental	Regional
Housing Tax (TH)	17.55%	0.00%	7.80%	0.00%
Land tax on the built-up properties (TFPB)	25.17%	0.00%	11.57%	2.12%
Land tax on the non-built-up properties (TFPNB)	49.21%	0.00%	42.44%	5.28%
Property contribution of businesses (ex-TP)	0.00%*	24.27%	0.00%	0.00%

=== Employment ===
In 2017, 45,489 people had a job, of which 90.5% was salaried employment. The rate of unemployment in the city is 18.2%.

Employment by industry
Professional category	Number of jobs
Agriculture	228
Industry	4,810
Construction	2,262
Trade, transport, services	21,281
Public administration, education, health	16,229

== Local culture and heritage ==
=== Sites and monuments ===
Many monuments of Valence are protected as historical monuments. Many of these monuments are in the quarter of Vieux Valence.

The best known of Valence's monuments to its notable inhabitants include those to Émile Augier the dramatist by the duchess of Uzès (1897), and to General Championnet.

==== Vieux Valence ====
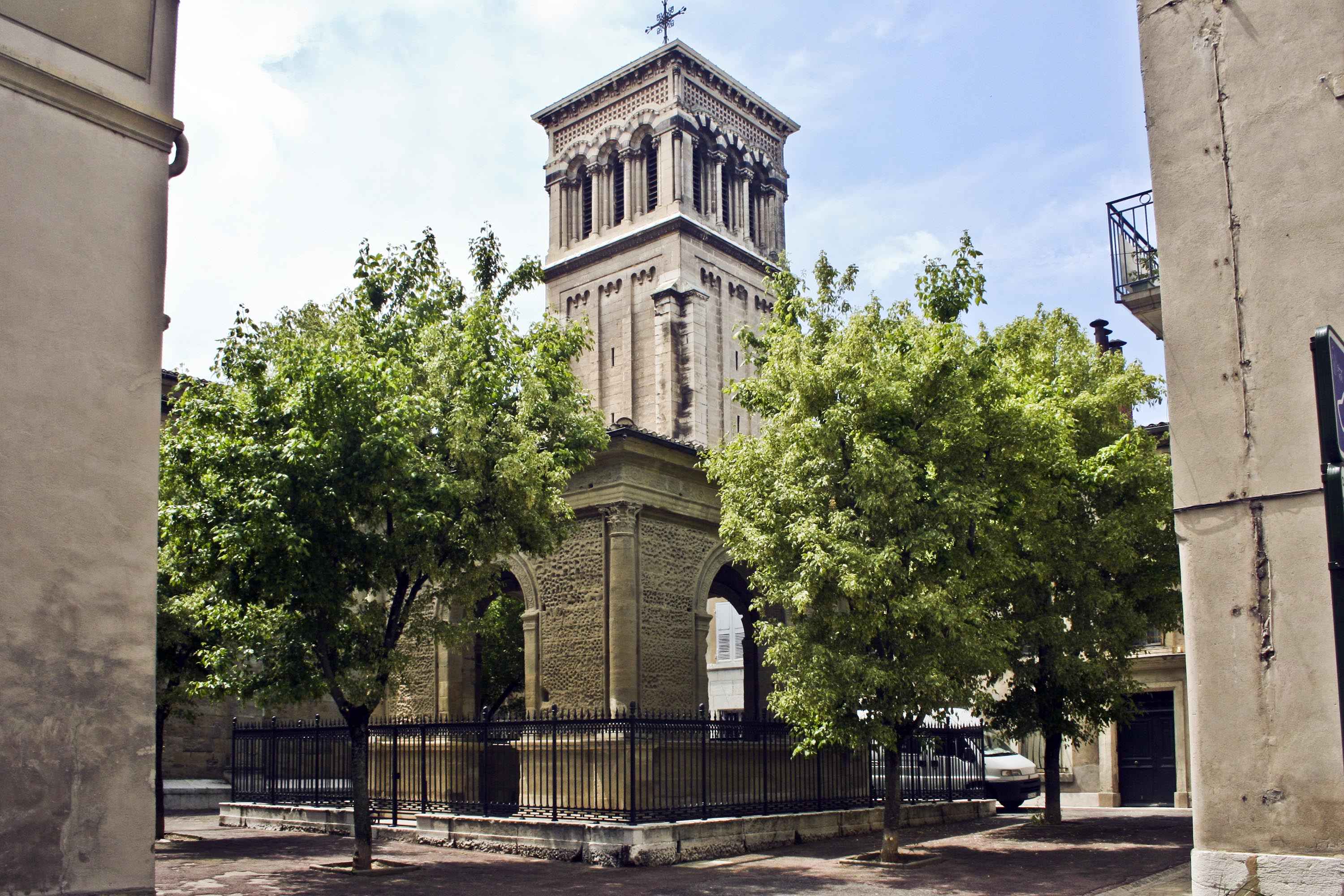
The Pendentif and the bell tower of the Saint-Apollinaire Cathedral.

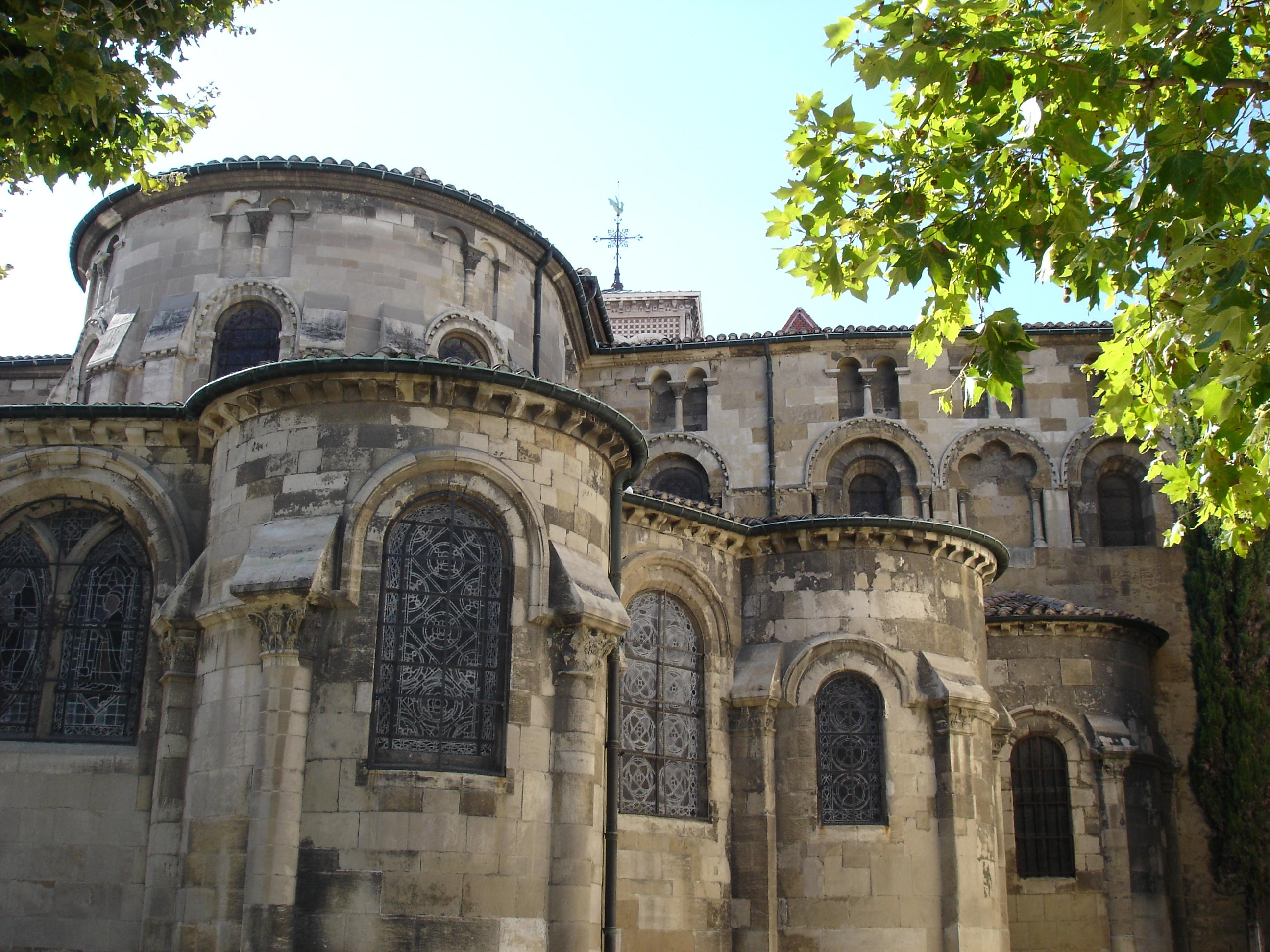
The side of Saint-Apollinaire Cathedral from the Place des Clercs.

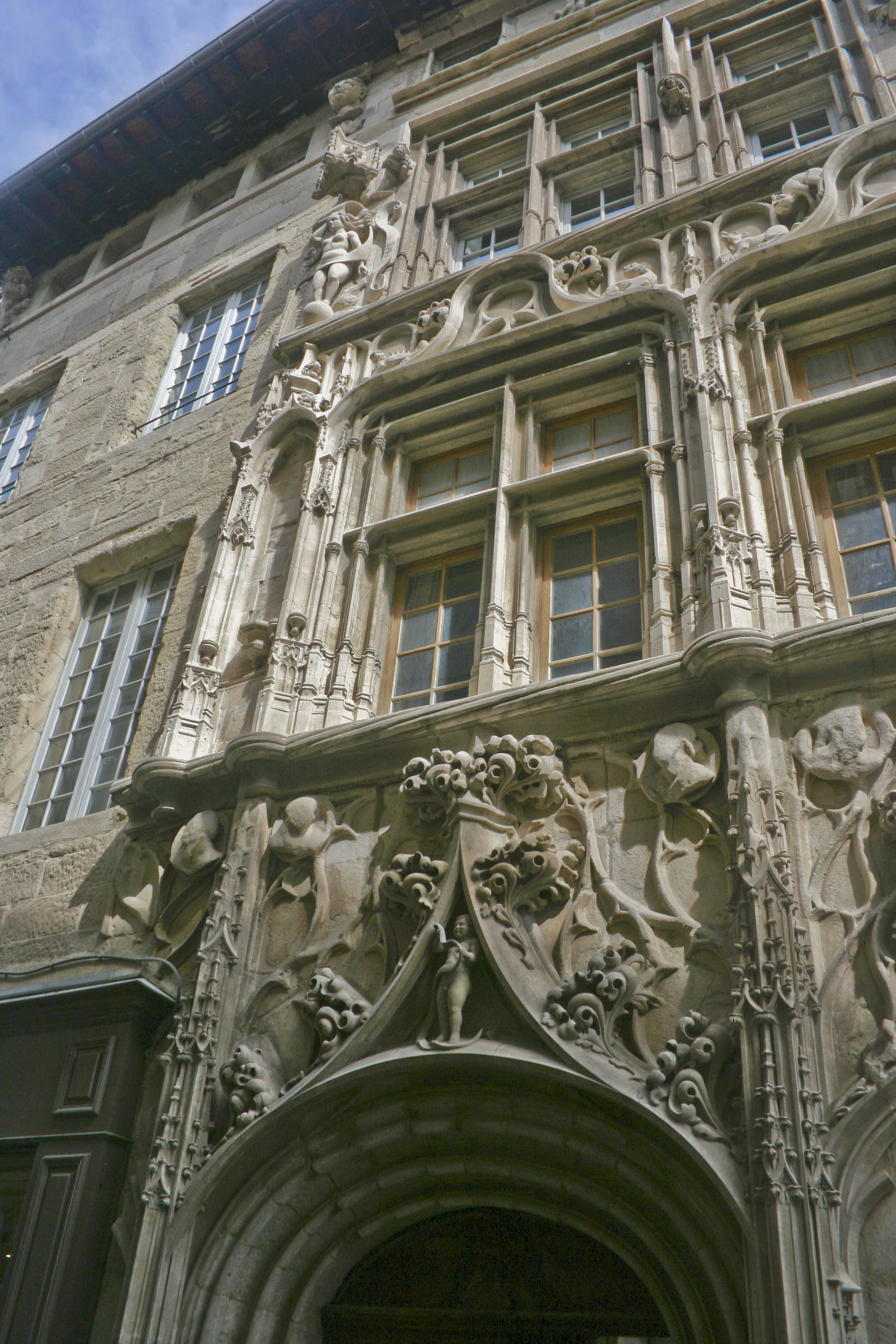
Maison des Têtes, detail of the façade.

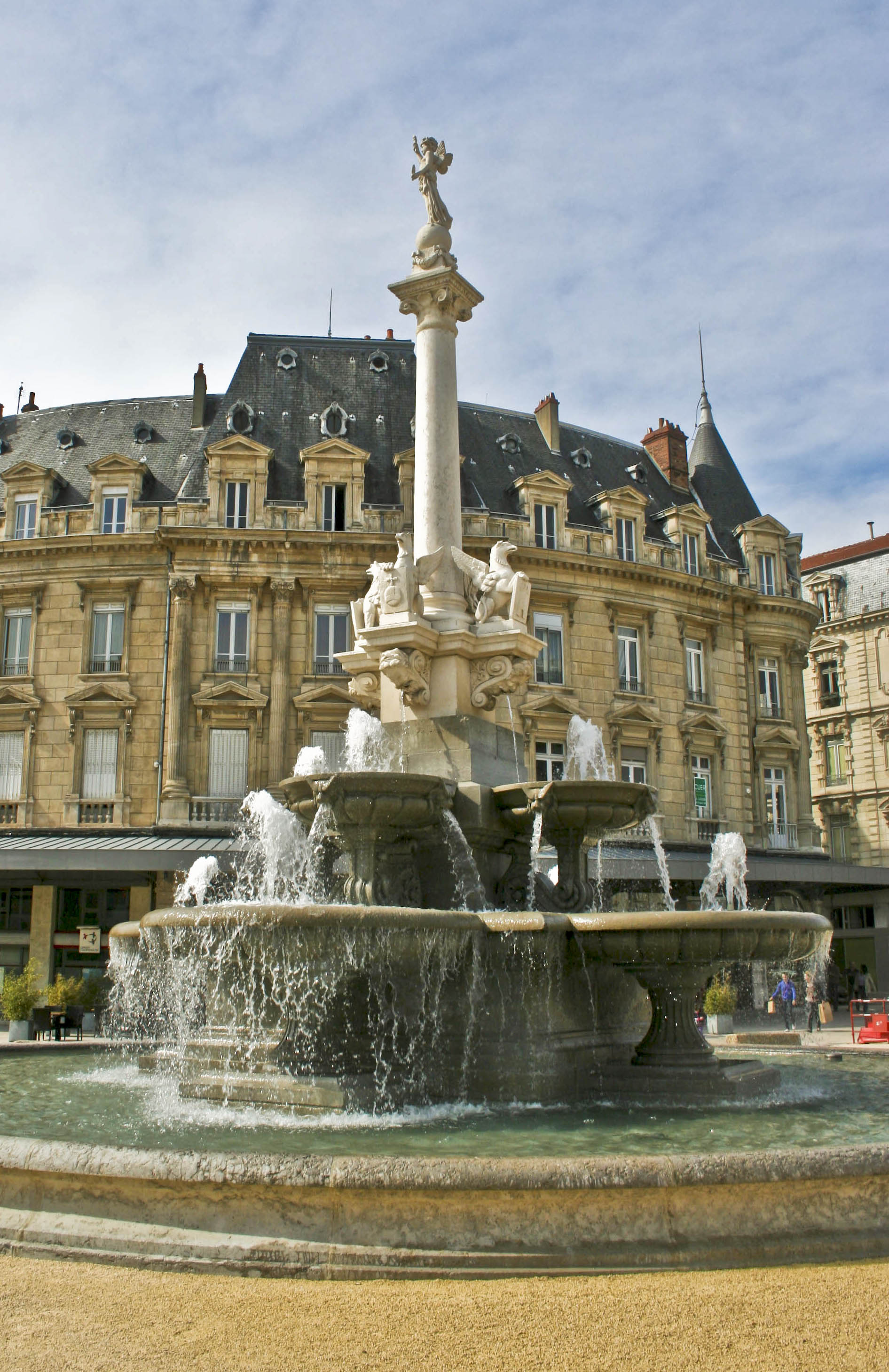
The monumental fountain.

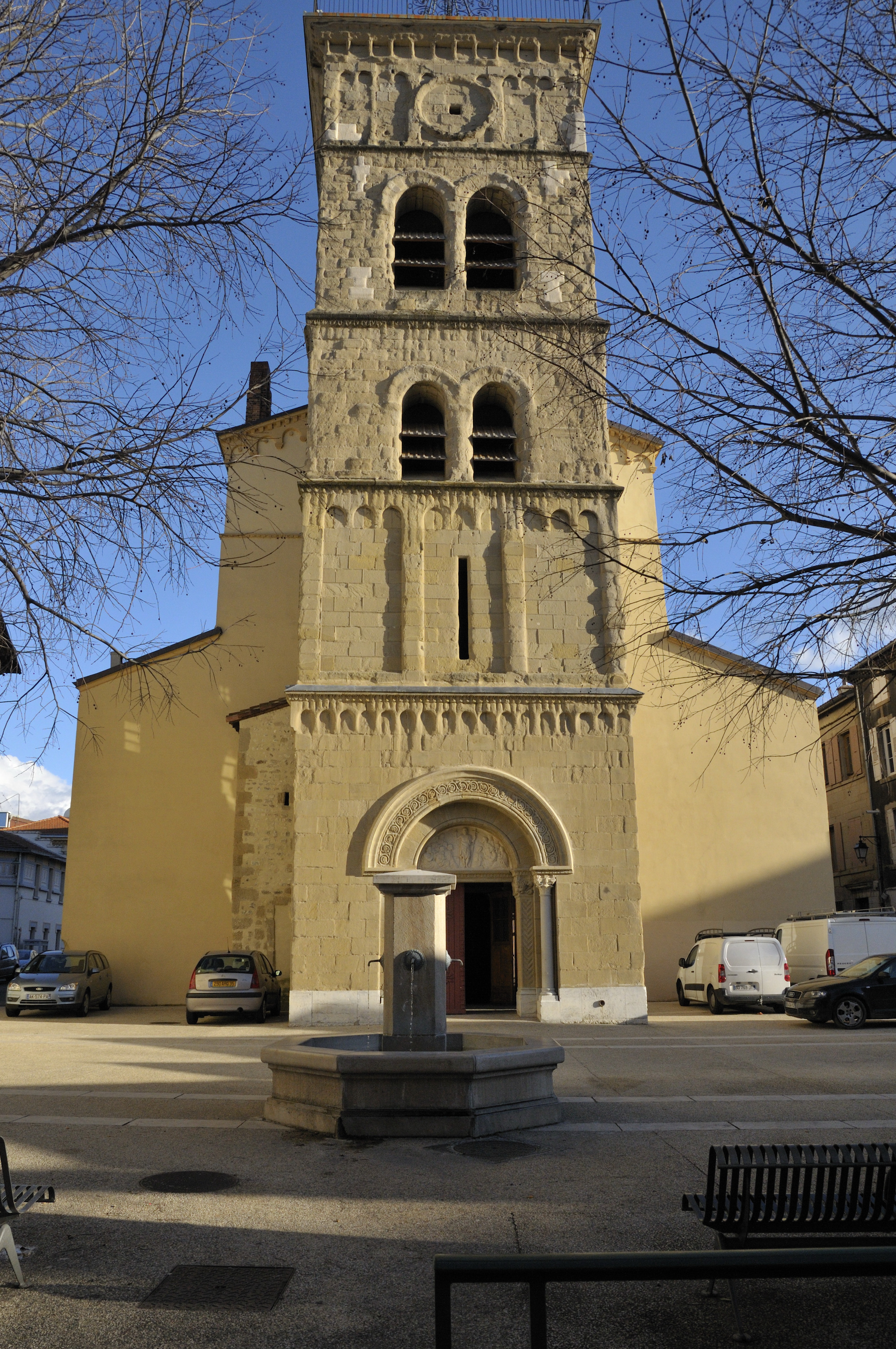
The Church of Saint-Jean-Baptiste.

Vieux Valence [Old Valence] is a quarter in the old city of Valence, based primarily around the Place des Clercs and also including the lower town district. It is expected the 19th century so that the city's ramparts, replaced by boulevards in 1860. Valencia then grows in range around its ancient centre. In this area that formerly comprised the historic centre of the city of Valencia, there are:

Saint-Apollinaire Cathedral is a Romanesque cathedral, which was built in the 11th century. It was the Bishop Gontard (1063–1099) who drove construction of this edifice which is now the oldest in the city. Several blocks of stone from the Saint-Apollinaire Cathedral were reused from the Gallo-Roman buildings of the city of Valentia. The Cathedral of St. Apollinaris, which has an architecturally notable apse, and was consecrated in 1095 by pope Urban II. It suffered extensive damage in the French Wars of Religion, but it was restored in the first decade of the 17th century. The porch and the stone tower above it were rebuilt in 1861. The church contains the monument of Pius VI, who died at Valence in 1799. The library and the museum containing Roman antiquities, sculptures, and a picture gallery are housed in the old ecclesiastical seminary.

The Maison des Têtes, built between 1528 and 1532 by Antoine de Dorne, Consul in Valence, royal professor at the university, the Renaissance façade with several heads carved representing the winds, fortune, time and even theology. This House, marking the transition from the Gothic to the Renaissance style, owes its name to the many heads that adorn its facade. The corridor is decorated with busts of Roman emperors. The building has been classified as a historical monument since 1944.

The Museum of Fine Arts of Valence is the only museum of its kind in Drôme, its collections bring together paintings, drawings, sculptures, decorative arts from the 16th century to the 20th century. Created in 1850 and installed in the former bishopric since 1911, it houses a hundred drawings by Hubert Robert with lots of sanguine. The work to expand the museum (which began in 2009) was completed in December 2013. The new layout of the museum consists of 35 rooms, spread over five floors: On the ground floor are archaeological collections which are continued on the fifth and fourth floors, then going back in time, down to the lower levels. The layout permits easy circulation by stairs and elevators, and privileged with natural lighting, opening many views over the city and the Rhône, while highlighting the architecture of the former bishopric.

The Pendentif de Valence, a building of Renaissance inspiration, which is probably the funerary monument of Nicolas Mistral, Canon of the Saint-Apollinaire Cathedral, seems to have been built in 1548, from a stone engraved with an inscription to that effect. This monument was transformed, after the Revolution, into a drinking establishment. It was bought by the city of Valence around 1830 and is part of the first monuments registered national historical monuments inventory after a visit by Prosper Mérimée in Drôme.

The Maison du Drapier, a 13th-century house, keeps a medieval aspect despite the restorations of the 19th century. It probably, belonged originally to a rich clothier. The ground floor was devoted to artisanal production and trade, while the floors sheltered the housing of the craftsman.

The Maison de la Pra, a 15th-century mansion, property of Claude Frère, a rich merchant who was first president of the Parlement du Dauphiné. The lantern of the staircase stands on the ancient walls between the Tower of the Cathedral and the belfry of Saint John, in the heart of the old town.

The Maison Dupré-Latour, dating from the 16th century, has a remarkable staircase tower. The Maison Dupré-Latour is a former mansion that was built by the Genas family, traders enriched by the salt trade. In 1760, the building was bought by François Dupré-Latour whose name would remain attached to the building and whose descendants continue to live there. In 1993, the building was transferred to the city and has been classified as an historical monument since 1927.

The moorish house known as Mauresque à Ferlin, after the name of its owner, was built in 1858 and of oriental inspiration.

The Church of Saint-Jean-Baptiste (11th century and 12th century) and its 19th-century Romanesque Revival gatehouse. This church of the old town is perched at the highest point of the city, signs of its age. It would be one of the first places of Christian worship then emerging in Valence.

The temple of the Abbey of Saint-Ruf, former chapel of a Roman priory. The Order of the Canons Regular of Saint Ruf was born in Avignon, where a small community of clerics became one of the spearheads of the reform of the clergy in the Rhone valley and beyond. The importance acquired by the canons of Saint-Ruf generated tensions with the cathedral chapter, which led to the transfer of the head of order (i.e. the mother abbey) in Valence.

The église Notre-Dame [Church of Our Lady], located on Rue Berthelot. Built in the mid-nineteenth century, offices there are now led by the Priestly Fraternity of St. Peter according to the extraordinary form of the Roman rite.

The Italian theatre dates back to 1837. The site is that of the former Saint Mary of the Visitation convent. Initially, the desire was to erect a city hall. After long drawn-out construction decisions, the city took advantage of a windfall from a private initiative for the construction of a theatre. The Italian room was built between 1886 and 1887 by the architect Ange Madona. The domed ceiling is treated in trompe-l'œil; it recalls the Temple of Arts and depicts four genres (drama, comedy, opera and vaudeville). Completely renovated in the 1990s, the theatre of the city is one of the jewels of the 19th century architecture in Valence. It has 390 seats, a rehearsal room, and a dance studio.

The Abbaye Notre-Dame de Soyons is a former abbey of Benedictine women which was founded in 1632 by the transfer of the Abbey of St. John the Evangelist, from the village of Soyons (Ardèche) as a result of the Wars of Religion. It was registered as an historical monument from 1926.

The city hall, located on the Place de la Liberté in the heart of the city centre, was inaugurated in 1894. Its architecture is special, because it has a belfry, a secular steeple symbolising the independence of the city against the Catholic Church, a classical facade and a roof of tiles of different colors. It hosts the activities of the town hall, with the offices of the mayor, city council and administrative services.

The Armenian heritage centre is a place of history and memory that addresses the original news around major themes: Migration, the memory of conflicts and the history of peoples and cultures. Indeed, Valence has one of the largest Armenian communities in France. The Armenian heritage centre is installed in the former Faculty of Law at the heart of the pedestrian centre of Valence, close to the historic Valence quarter of Armenian origin (concentrated around the Rue Bouffier, Rue Armenia and Rue Belle Image).

The ancienne préfecture, near the Place Saint-Jean, where remains only the monumental entrance gate. The rest was destroyed in a bombing raid during World War II on 15 August 1944. It has been at this place since the end of the 18th century. Previously, at the abbatial palace of Saint-Ruf.

The Place des Clercs is lined by colorful facades. It is from the 5th century, when the episcopal district was created, that the Place des Clercs began to gain importance. Shops settled, markets took place and did justice. In the Middle Ages there were two churches: The cathedral from the 11th century and Notre-Dame de la Ronde which was older (a remaining column is currently in the public toilets). The Wars of Religion significantly deteriorated these buildings.

The "côtes", picturesque mounts of the upper town. There are traces of the walls at the top of the Côte Sainte-Ursule and at the bottom of Côte Sylvante; they served to protect the city from invasions, epidemics or flooding caused by the Rhône. They were widely used in medieval times by the people (boatmen, carters, mule, etc.) who used these stairs to go to the small streets and squares of the upper town. The Côte Sainte-Ursule meanwhile was less used; it separated the properties of two monasteries. It is set at the location of the Roman theatre and probably served as an exit. One may also include the Côtes Saint-Martin, Saint-Estève, des Chapeliers and la Voûte.

==== In the city ====
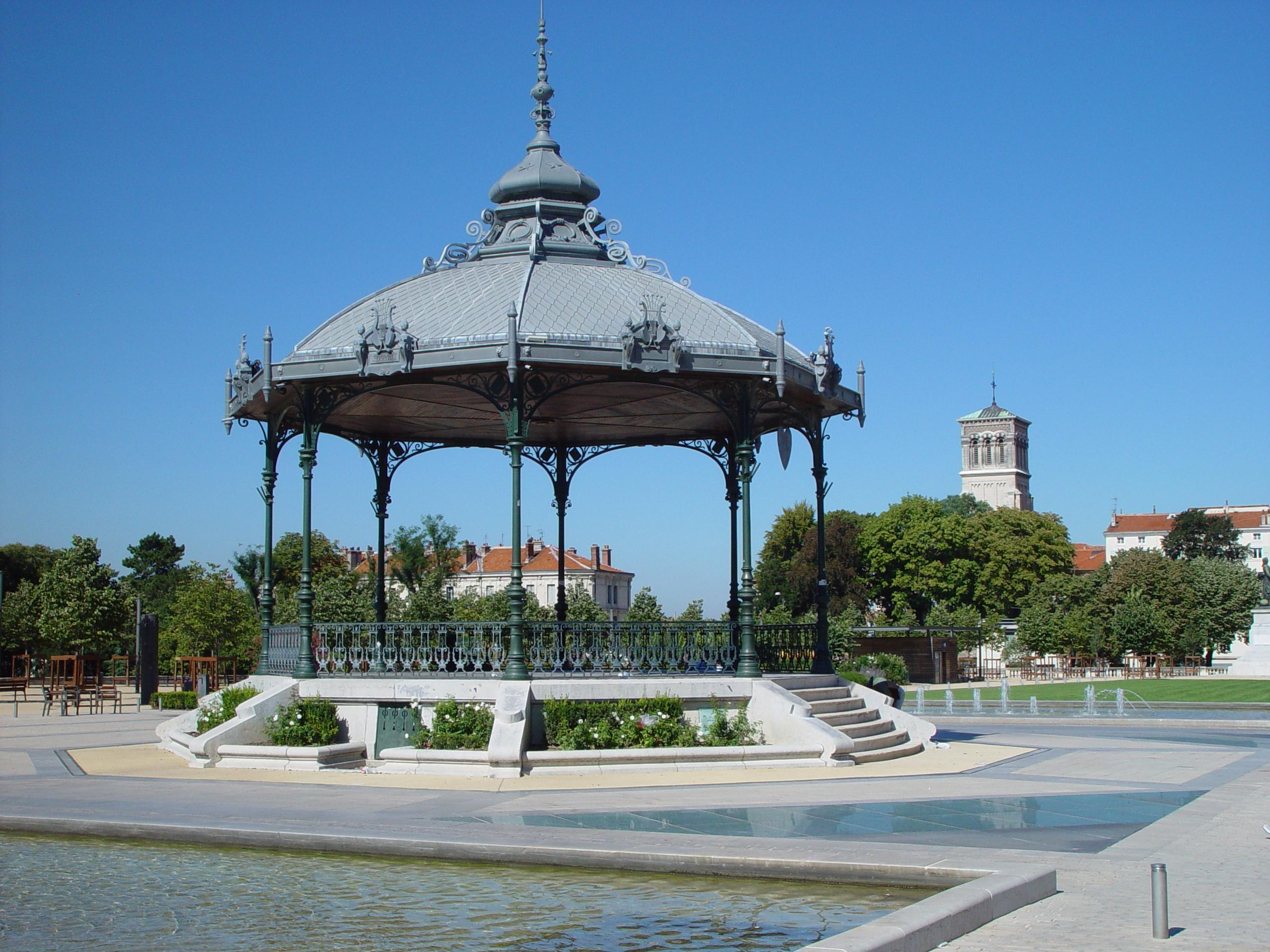
The Kiosque Peynet on the Champ de Mars, with the tower of the Saint-Apollinaire Cathedral in the background.

The "Boulevards de Valence", a wide promenade, traced on the former location of the ramparts and tree-lined with Haussmannian-style buildings, which had a renovation from 2004 to 2009.

The bandstand built in 1860 on the esplanade of the Champ de Mars served as the model the designer Raymond Peynet to immortalize his love, and which carries the name of Peynet kiosk. It is classified a historical monument since 1982.

The monumental fountain, designed by the architect Eugène Poitoux and dating from 1887, is located in the city centre, on the boulevards. In 2005, the fountain was renovated and moved a few metres, in order to better integrate into the perspective of the renovated boulevards and in 2006, a copy of the winged genius, which was destroyed in 1954 by lightning which struck the column, was replaced at the top of the column.

Jouvet Park, a public garden of 7 hectares (17 acres) created in 1905, and opened by president Émile Loubet, bears the name of Théodore Jouvet, donor of the land, and includes more than 700 trees of various species. This park also has a pet shop, a small train, and a rose garden.

Valence-Ville station, has a façade which was inspired by the Petit Trianon at Versailles. The passenger building of today, which was commissioned in April 1866, was designed by Louis-Jules Bouchot, architect of Napoleon III. The main façade on the Rue du Pavillon Central has been registered as an historic monument since 11 October 1982.

The esplanade of the Champ de Mars, which before the conversion work of 2001 was a car park dotted with plane trees, is today a wide tree-lined esplanade, where one can see beyond the Rhône to the Château de Crussol, at the forefront of the Ardèche mountains.

The Philolaus water tower (first studies of the sculptor in 1963), built between 1969 and 1971, is located in Jean-Perdrix Park, between the quarters of le Plan and Fontbarlettes, east of the city. It consists of two twisted towers with high clean lines, 52 metres (171 ft) and 57 metres (187 ft) high, which combine functionality and artistic research. In 1981, he received the "prix du quartier de l'Horloge" [prize of the quarter of the clock] for the best work of urban art in the 1970s. The water tower sculpture was distinguished by the label "20th century" in 2003 and was the subject of a stamp in 2013.

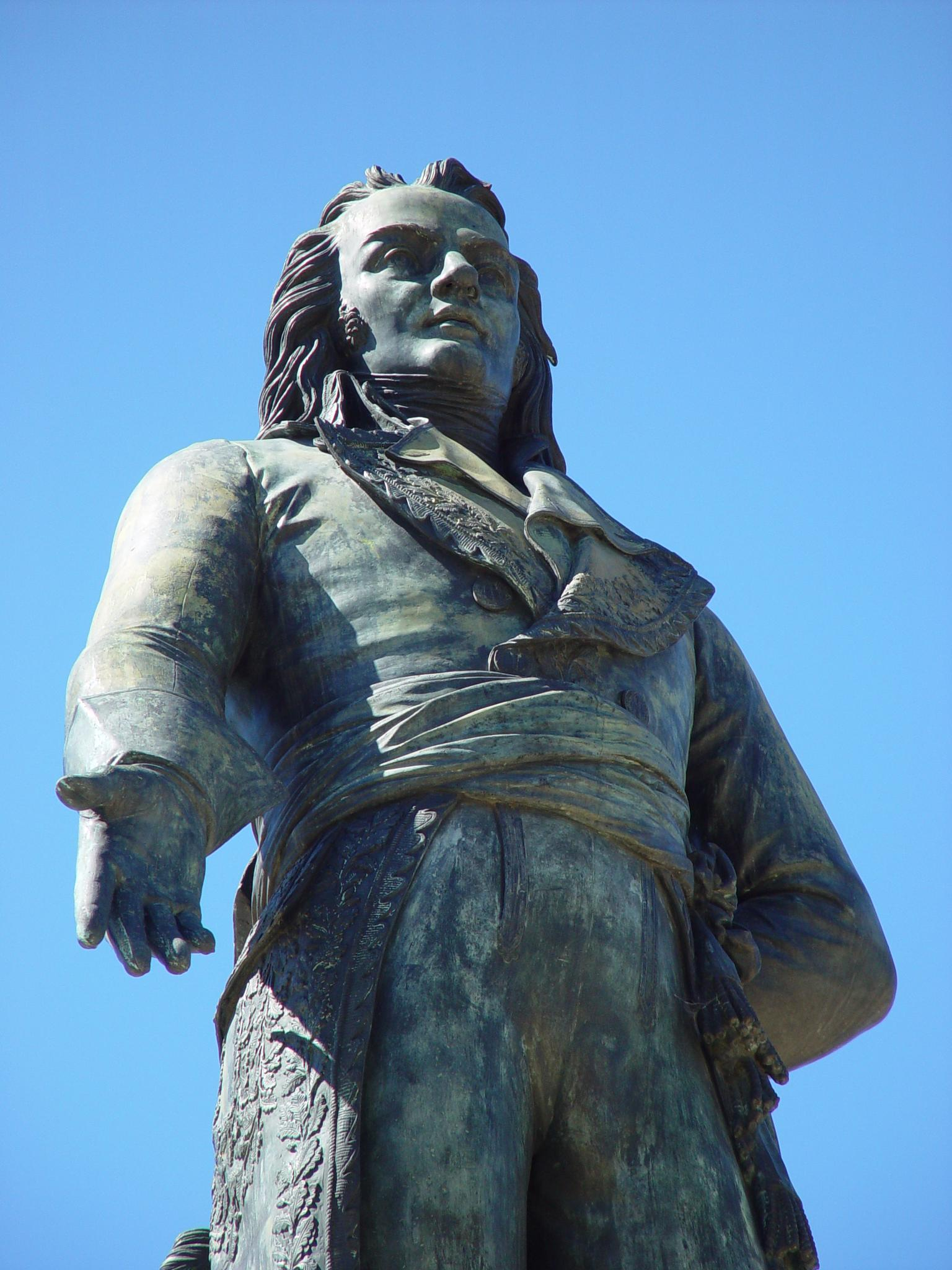
Statue of Championnet on the Champ de Mars

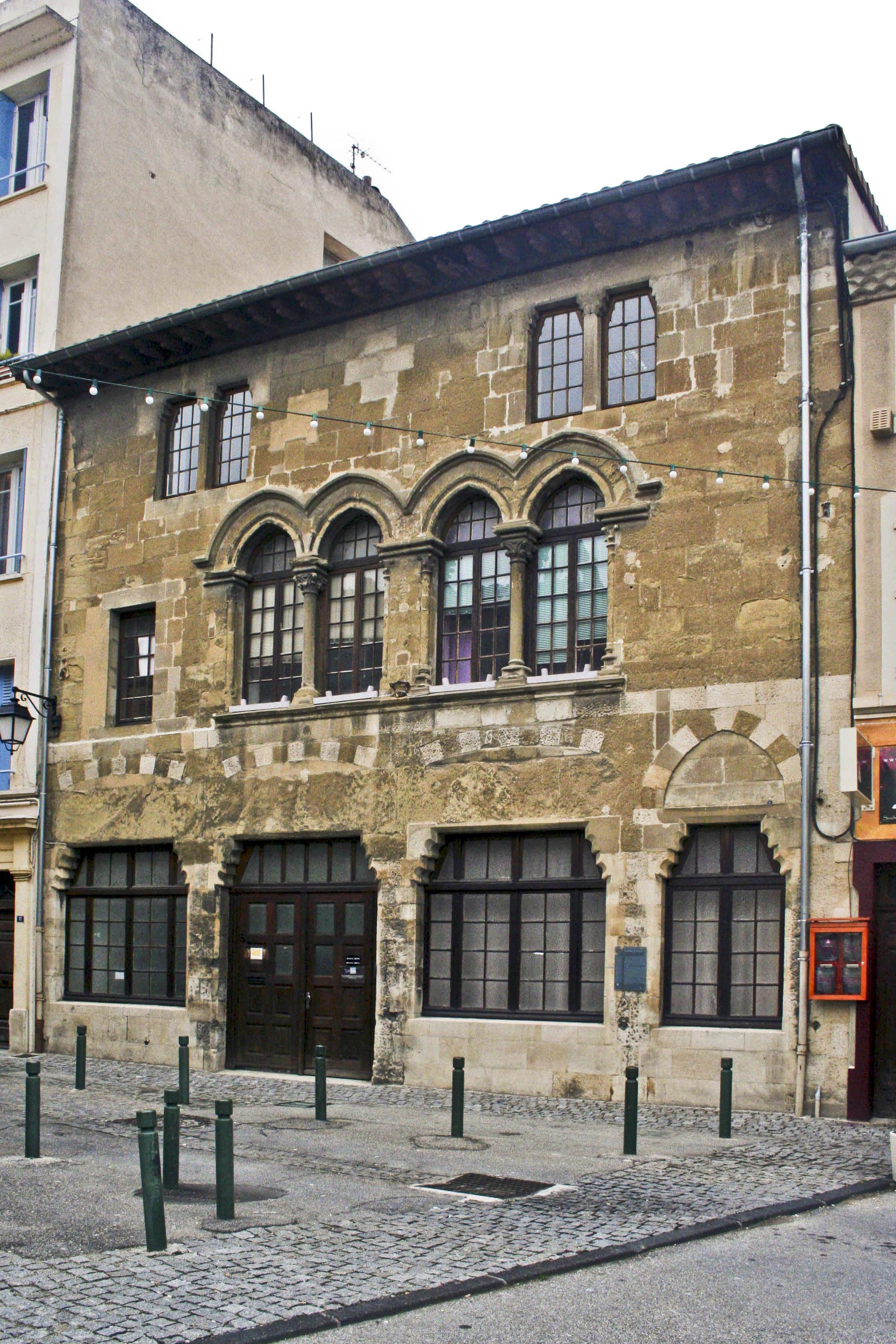
The Maison du Drapier

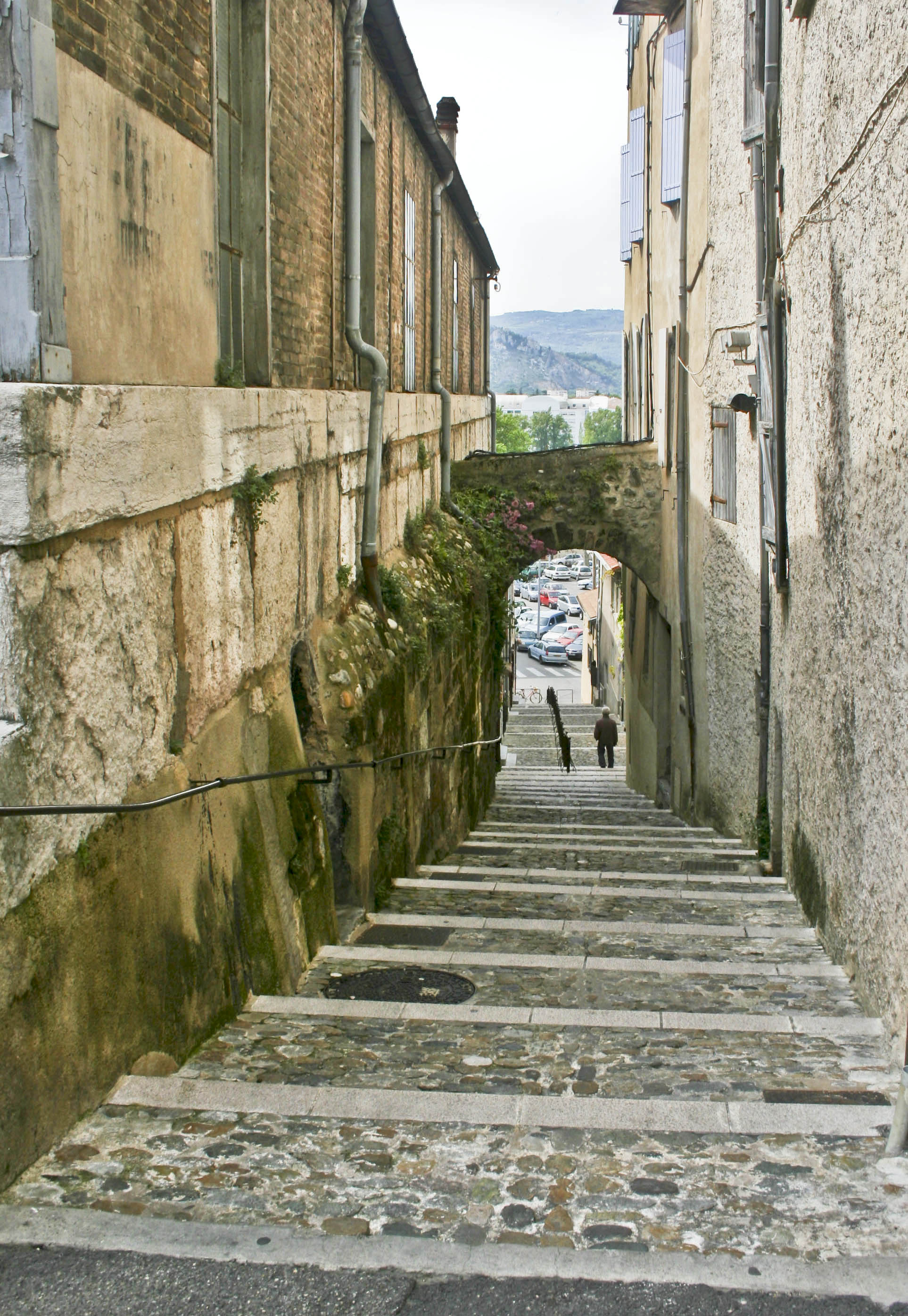
A "côte" of Valence, on leaving the place de la Pierre (Basse ville)

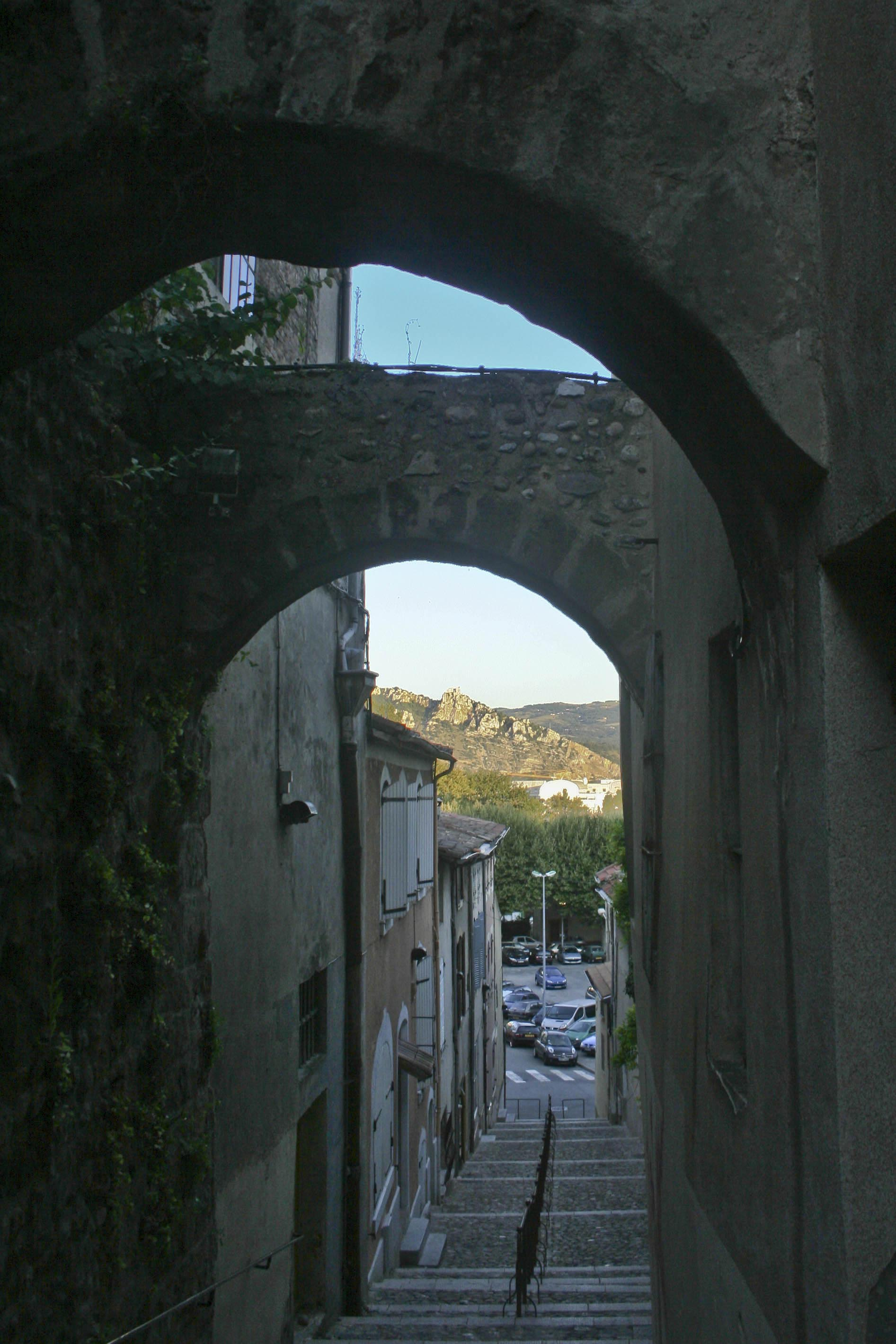
The côte Saint-Martin. In the distance, the ruins of the Château de Crussol (Ardèche)

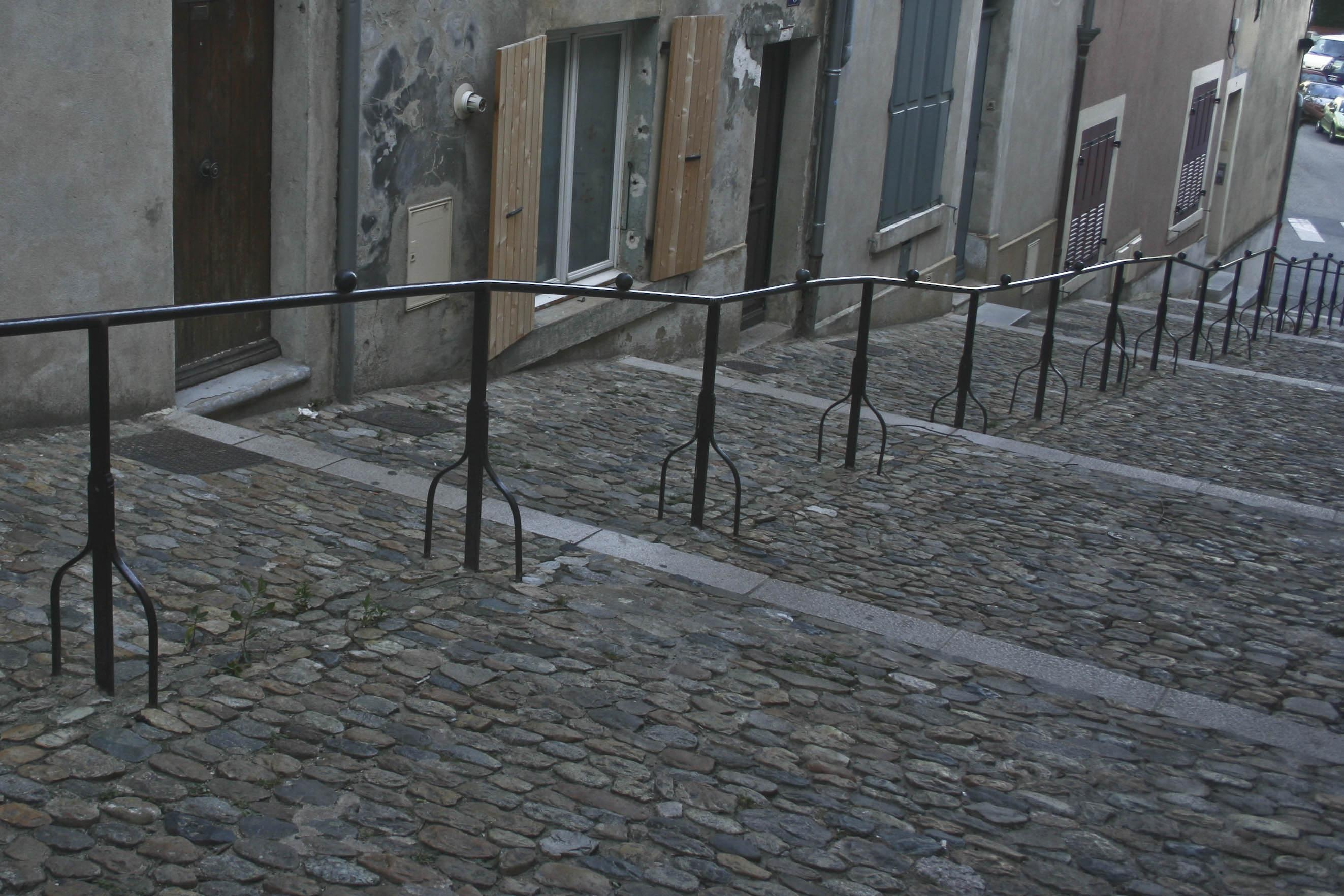
Stairs of the côte Saint-Martin

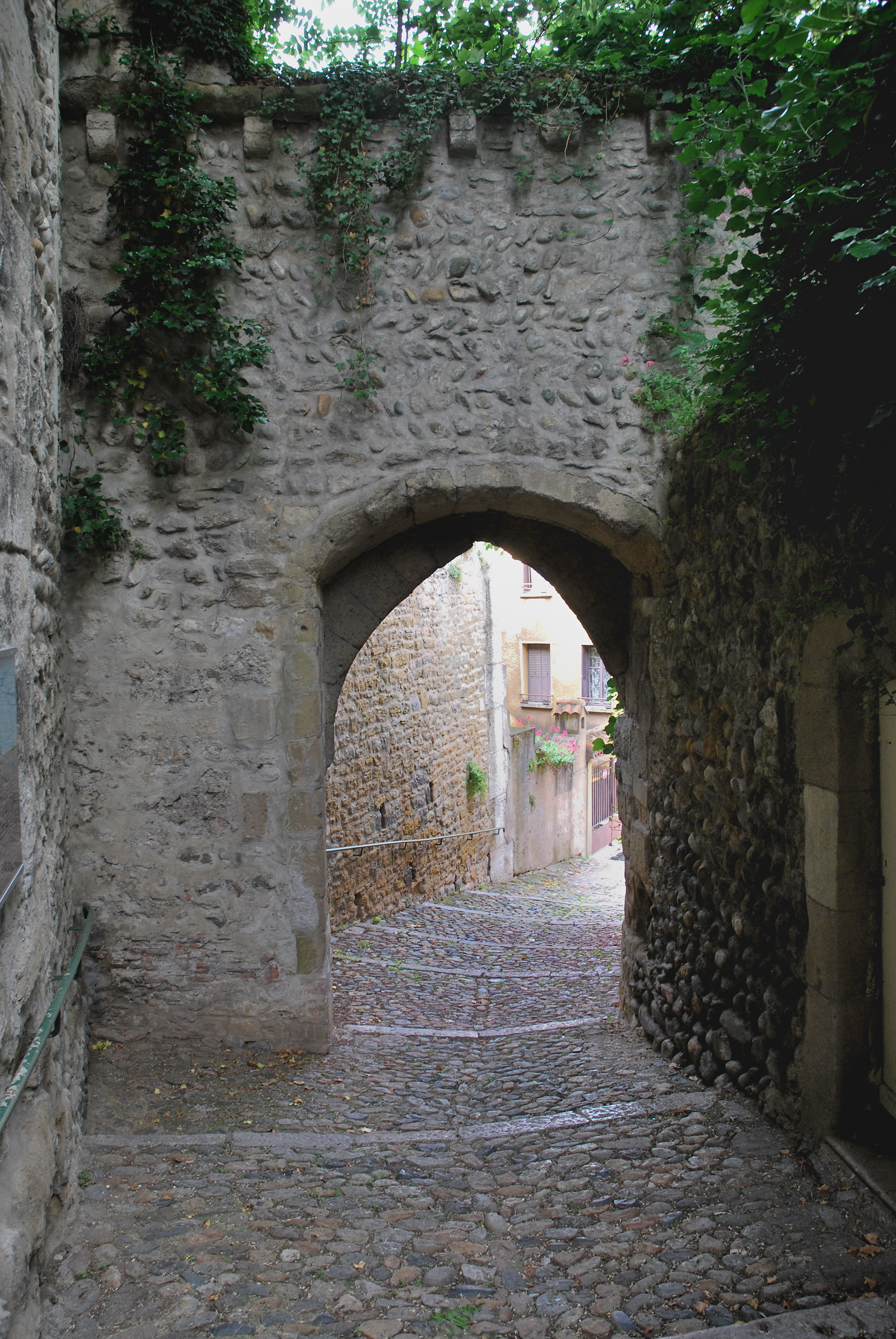
The Sylvante gate

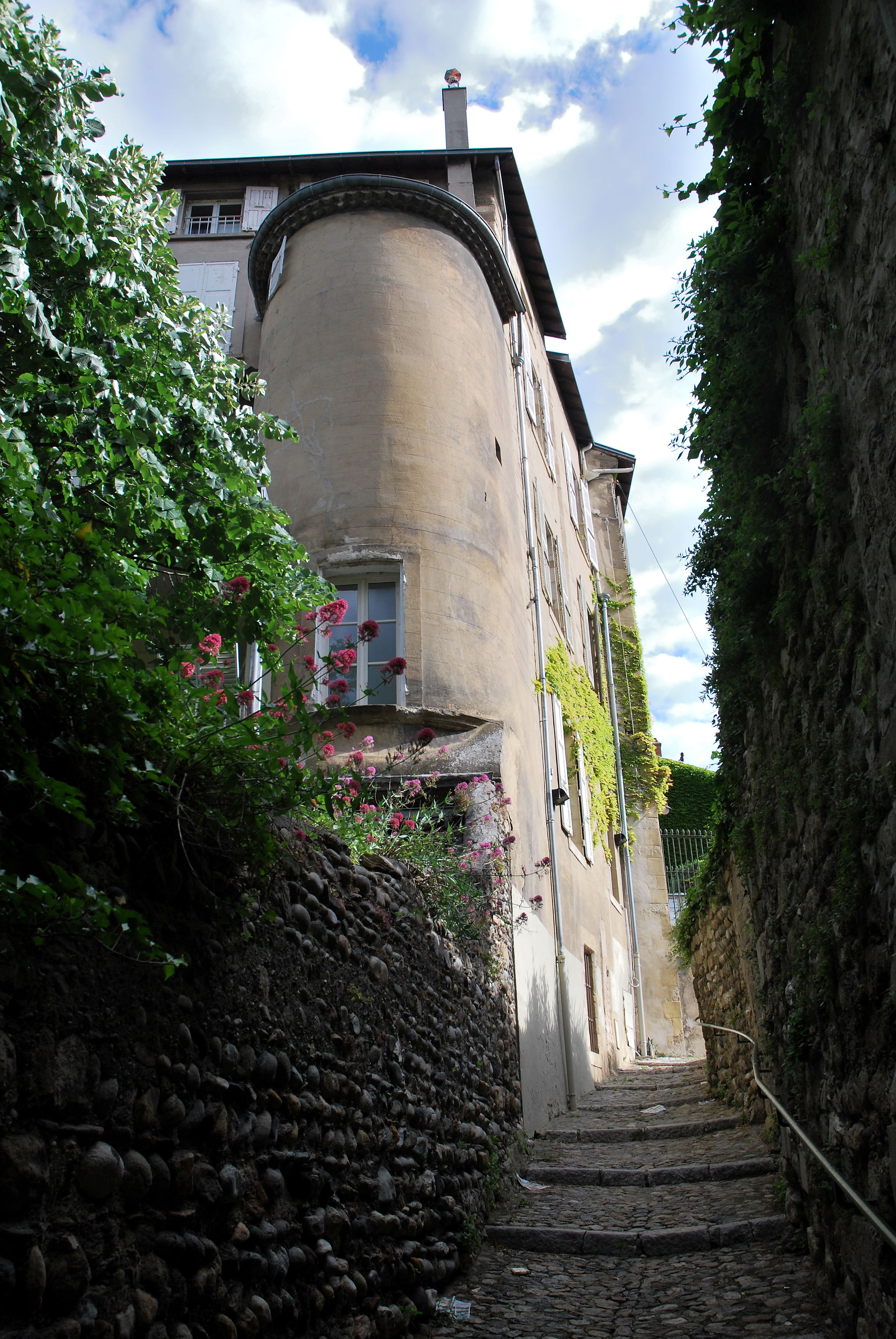
The top of the côte Sylvante.

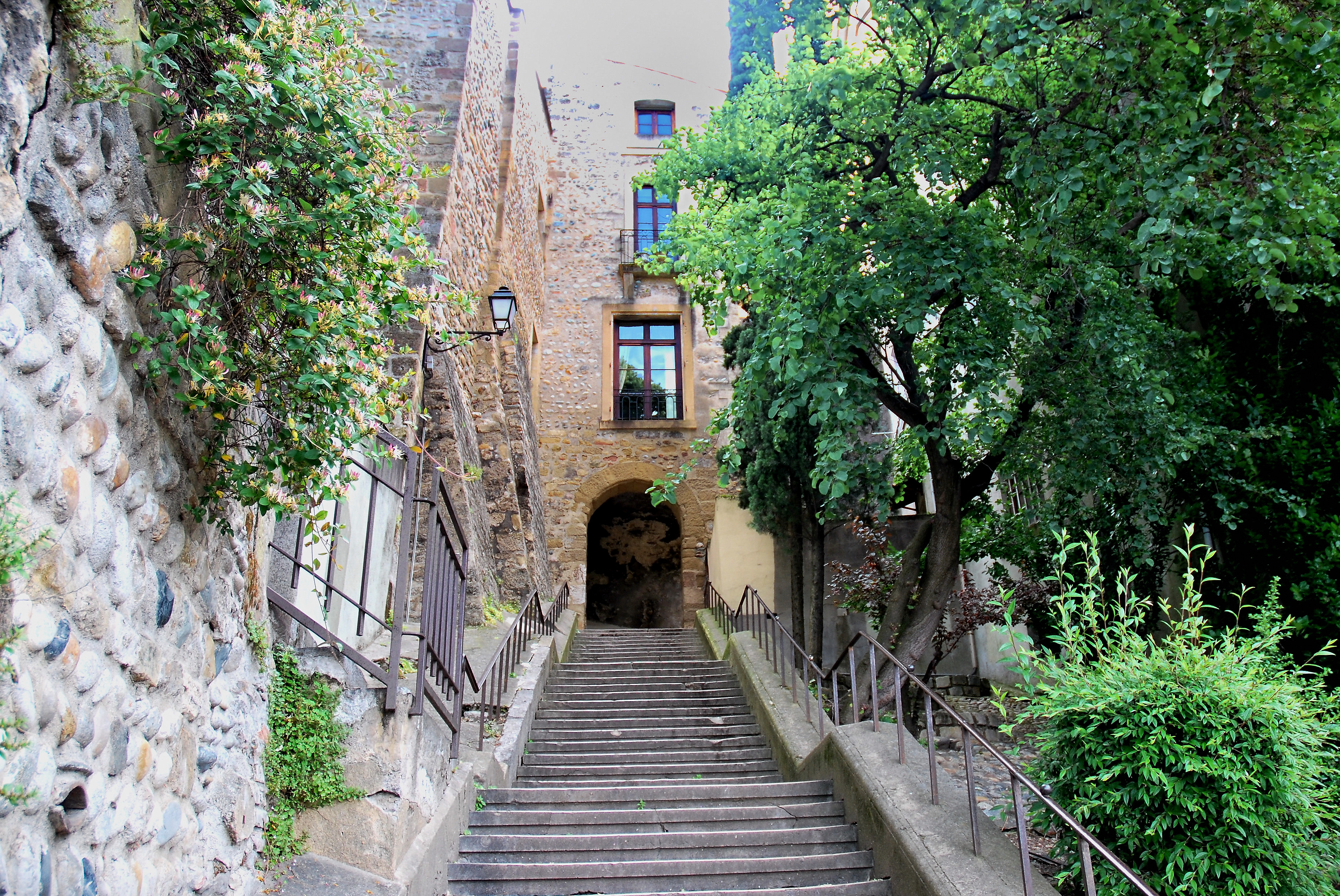
Côte Saint-Estève under the cathedral

==== The Valence channels ====
A unique ecological and natural heritage in France, channels accompany Valence since Roman times. The name of Valence comes from three Celtic words: "val" (water), "len" (plain) and "ty" (House) and would mean "water-rich inhabited place". At the time these rivers allowed the inhabitants to satisfy many needs and activities: Fishing, irrigation, washing, soaking, driving force for flour mills, oil, fuller and silk. They are now a place to walk for many inhabitants.

It is in the neighborhoods east of Valence, at the foot of a terrace, the terrasse du séminaire, that the channels (with a total length of 17 kilometres (11 mi), or 40 kilometres (25 mi) when counting secondary irrigation channels) originate. Very quickly, the Valence people strove to channel these waters forming unhealthy marshes. In the 13th century, the regulation and the use of the channels was the privilege of the monasteries of Saint-Ruf and Saint-Victor, who decided the location of the mills.

Indeed, the water used for irrigation, drinking water and washhouses, was also a valuable source of energy for the economic development of the era. The main (Charran, Thon, Moulins and Malcontents) cross the city from east to west before joining to form the Canal de l'Épervière which then flows into the Rhône. In the 19th century, the channels lost their significance and would even be a little forgotten, hidden by urbanisation, high-rise buildings and roads.

In recent years, the municipality has undertaken a development work of paths, bordered by poplars and willows, along these channels. Green routes have been signposted along the canals of des Malcontents, de la Grande Marquise, de Thibert, du Charran and de Californie. Channels which still continue to water gardens. The municipality also wants to promote gentle travel along the banks of the channels.

=== Parks and green spaces ===
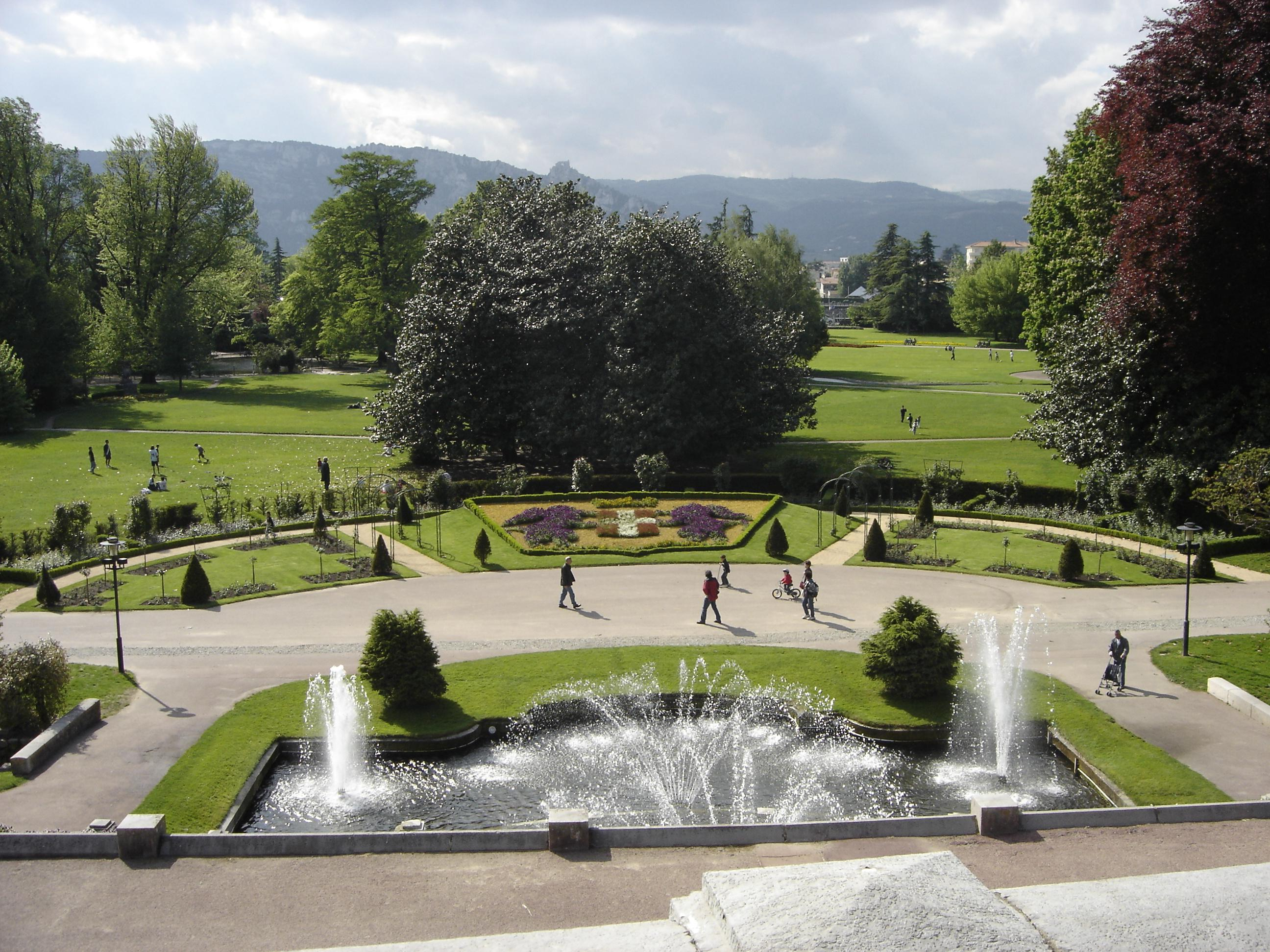
The Jouvet Park and its fountain, on the side of the Champ de Mars.

Located in the city centre between Vieux Valence and the Lycée Emile Loubet, the Champ de Mars esplanade is a large walk of 3 hectares (7.4 acres) planted with lime trees, with the Peynet kiosk in its centre.

Under this terrace lies the city garden or Jouvet Park. It bears the name of Théodore Jouvet, a generous donor who gave, to the city of Valence, the amount required for the purchase of the land and whose statue is placed near the belvedere from the Belle Époque. This garden occupies the slopes which connect the lower town and the Champ de Mars. It is crossed by small streams and adorned with statues. The central park, it is also one of the most important monumental and civic ensembles of Valence: The monument to the dead of the Valence commune, obelisk-shaped, was built after World War I; the general Championnet, a native son, also had his statue here, which was removed in May 1944 and hidden, to prevent it from being melted by the occupying Germany. The meeting of physician Gilbert Dreyfuse with Louis Aragon, his contact in the Resistance, was told by the poet after war in a small article, published in 2001.

Covering an area of 26 hectares (64 acres), Jean-Perdrix Park is the largest in the city. It lies in the quarter of Fontbarlettes. The park has many trees, including 400 cedars near a natural space in the shape of an amphitheatre. This park of Valence offers a fitness trail, playgrounds for children, and a wide body of water on which is reflected the two futuristic water towers. Built between 1969 and 1971 by the Greek sculptor Philolaus at the initiative of the urban architect André Gomis, the water tower is a sculpture-architecture labelled "heritage of the 20th century" and consists of two twisted towers, the tallest measuring 57 metres (187 ft) high.

The Saint-Ruf Park is the park of the former prefecture and is located in Vieux Valence. It offers views of Ardèche and the ruins of Crussol. It connects the historic centre to the old town. It was on this hillside, which is particularly well sited for sunset, that the Free Commune of Saint-Jean planted its vineyards. At the entrance to the park is the portal of the abbatial palace of the Abbey of Saint-Ruf.

Located in the quarter of Valensolles, Marcel-Paul Park is a landscaped park of 3.7 hectares (9.1 acres) which channels a country stream, from a natural source. It features lawns which are accessible to all, a children's playground and a space for bowling.

Not far lies the Recreation Park of l'Épervière. In addition to its marina, this park includes a body of water of 32,000 square metres (340,000 sq ft), protected by a 400 metres (1,300 ft) long breakwater. In its leisure and relaxation area, the park contains restaurants, a campsite, a hotel, a swimming pool, a tennis court, billiards, bowling, walks, and offers river cruises.

Public green areas of Valence total 230 hectares (570 acres) (more than 10% of the area of the commune). The city's main parks are:

- Jean-Perdrix Park
- Jouvet Park
- Benjamin-Delessert Park
- The Recreation Park of l'Épervière
- Marcel-Paul Park
- Park of the Trinitaires
- Park of the Polygone
- Itchevan Park
- Châteauvert Park
- Saint-Ruf Park

In 2014, the municipality of Valence has the label "flowery city" with "4 flowers" awarded by the National Council of flowery cities and villages of France to the competition of flowery cities and villages.

=== Gastronomy ===
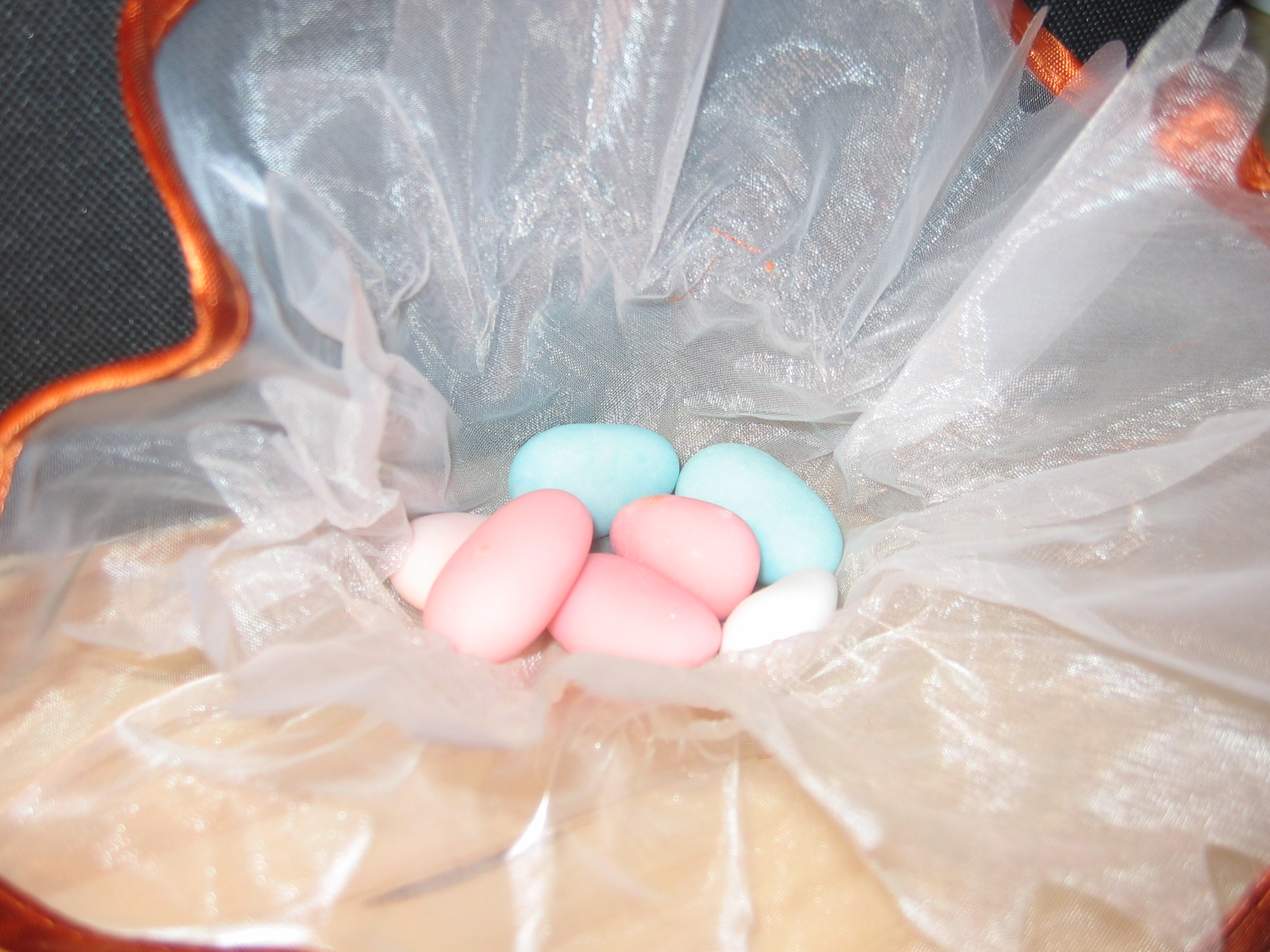
Dragées de Valence

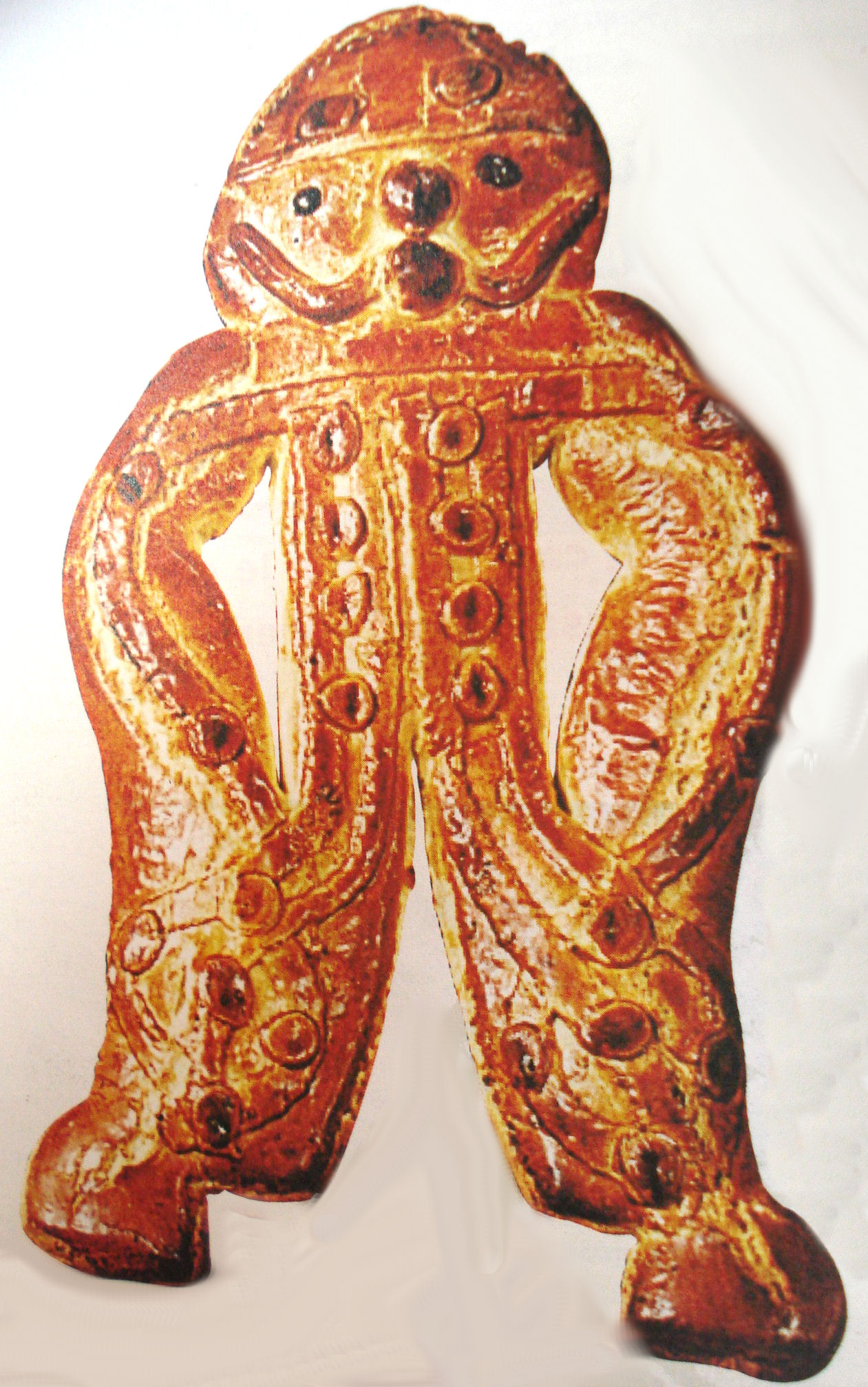
The Suisse
- The Suisse, a Valence specialty, is a shortcrust pastry biscuit shaped as a man. Sometimes improperly referred to as "Puppet", the Suisse of Valence is flavoured with orange blossom, it contains powder almond and small pieces of candied orange peel. The name, shape and decoration of this biscuit are inspired by the uniform of the Swiss Guards of Pope Pius VI who died in Valence. The Suisse is traditionally eaten during the Easter holidays and particularly during the festival of Palm Sunday.
- The Dragée de Valence is a confection of praline or of chocolate coated in sugar made in the purest tradition, to celebrate the solemn events of life such as baptisms, communions and weddings. The materials used are graded and regular almonds coming mainly from France (Ferraduelle), but also of Spain (Longuette, Planeta) or Sicily (Avola). These varieties are the only ones which allow the obtainment of a very pleasing dragée.
- The fruits which are commonly found in the Valence region include peaches, apples, pears, apricots, figs and many red fruits such as cherries, blackberries, wild cherries or raspberries.
- The renowned wines, Hermitage and Crozes-Hermitage, are found north of Valence in the Rhone Valley.

=== Garrison town ===
Since installation in 1773 an artillery regiment, the Regiment of la Fère, Valence was the place of confinement of numerous military units.

- The 75th Infantry Regiment long occupied the Bacquet barracks
- 1852–1873, a school of artillery, installed by Bonaparte under the Consulate and then abolished in 1828, since restored.
- The 6th Field Artillery Regiment, 1906–1914, was stationed in the Chareton barracks which was destroyed during World War II.
- In 1948, the 404th Anti-Aircraft Artillery Regiment moved to the La Tour-Maubourg Quarter, and then, in 1951, 477th Light Anti-Aircraft Artillery Group Bacquet barracks. In 1955, the 477th GAAL was attached to the 404th RAA, which was dissolved in 1964.
- 10th and 12th batteries of 155 of the 2nd Field Artillery Regiment, 1914
- 184th Towed Heavy Artillery Regiment, 1939–1940
- In 1879, the 5th Cavalry Regiment settled in the newly built barracks, on the Avenue de Romans.
- 1st Parachute Hussar Regiment, 1906
- 504th Tank Regiment, 1939–1940

- 10th Tank Battalion
- 11th Tank Battalion
- 12th Tank Battalion

Since 1984, the 1st Spahi Regiment has been installed at the barracks of the Bacquet Quarter.

== Twin towns – sister cities ==
Valence is twinned with:

- Asti, Italy (1966)
- Batroun, Lebanon (2005)
- Biberach an der Riss, Germany (1967)
- Gedera, Israel (1997)
- Ijevan, Armenia (1996)
- Pushkin, Russia (2017)
- Tendring, England, United Kingdom (1969)

In addition, Valence has a friendship declaration with:

- Stepanakert, Republic of Artsakh (2015)

== Notable people ==
- Saint Félix (?–212), priest, founder of the first Church of Valence, martyred here. A primary school in downtown bears his name.
- Laurent Joubert (1520–1583), physician to King Henry III of France
- Jacques Cujas (1522–1590), Professor at the University of Valence in 1557–1559 and 1567–1575
- Balthazar Baro (1596–1650), poet and playwright
- Louis Mandrin (1725–1755), smuggler, died here
- Jean-Denis de Montlovier (1733–1804), lawyer and man of letters
- Pierre Choderlos de Laclos (1741–1803), novelist, official and army general, established an artillery school here
- Alexandre Camille Taponier (1749–1831), general of division
- Napoleon (1769–1821), military and political leader, served here in the youth in the La Fère Artillery Regiment
- Pius VI (1717–1799), Pope, died here
- Jean-Étienne Championnet (1762–1800), general, his statue by Victor Sappey stands on the Champ de Mars
- Jean-Pierre Bachasson (1766–1823), Count of Montalivet, peer of France and statesman, Minister of the Interior of Napoleon and mayor of Valence. His statue stands on the Place Montalivet.
- Jean-Joseph Farre (1816–1887), general and Minister of War
- François-Désiré Bancel (1822–1871), politician, a boulevard of the city is named after him and his statue is installed in front of the station
- Louis Gallet (1835–1898), poet, novelist and librettist
- Louis Le Cardonnel (1862–1936), priest and poet
- Jules Nadi (1872–1928), politician
- René Alphonse Higonnet (1902–1983), engineer and co-inventor of the phototypesetting process
- Paul-Jacques Bonzon (1908–1978), writer, died here
- Paul Ricœur (1913–2005), philosopher
- Catherine Langeais (1923–1998), television presenter and actress
- Marc Aryan (1926–1985), French-Belgian singer-songwriter
- Jean-Claude Lamy (born 1941), writer and journalist
- Louis Nicollin (1943–2017), entrepreneur and chairman of Montpellier HSC
- Jacques Tardi (born 1946), comics artist
- Alain Robert (born 1962), urban climber, grew up here
- Éric Boisset (born 1965), children writer
- Anne-Sophie Pic (born 1969), master chef, 3 Michelin stars
- Jean-François Piège (born 1970), master chef, 2 Michelin stars
- Guillaume Gille (born 1976), handballer
- Jean-Pascal Yao (born 1977), footballer
- Sébastien Chabal (born 1977), rugby union player
- Bertrand Gille (born 1978), handballer
- Florent Peyre (born 1980), comedian and humorist
- Guillaume Bonnafond (born 1987), cyclist
- Axel Domont (born 1990), cyclist
- Dionysos (formed 1993), rock band

== In popular culture ==
=== Valence and its kiosque ===
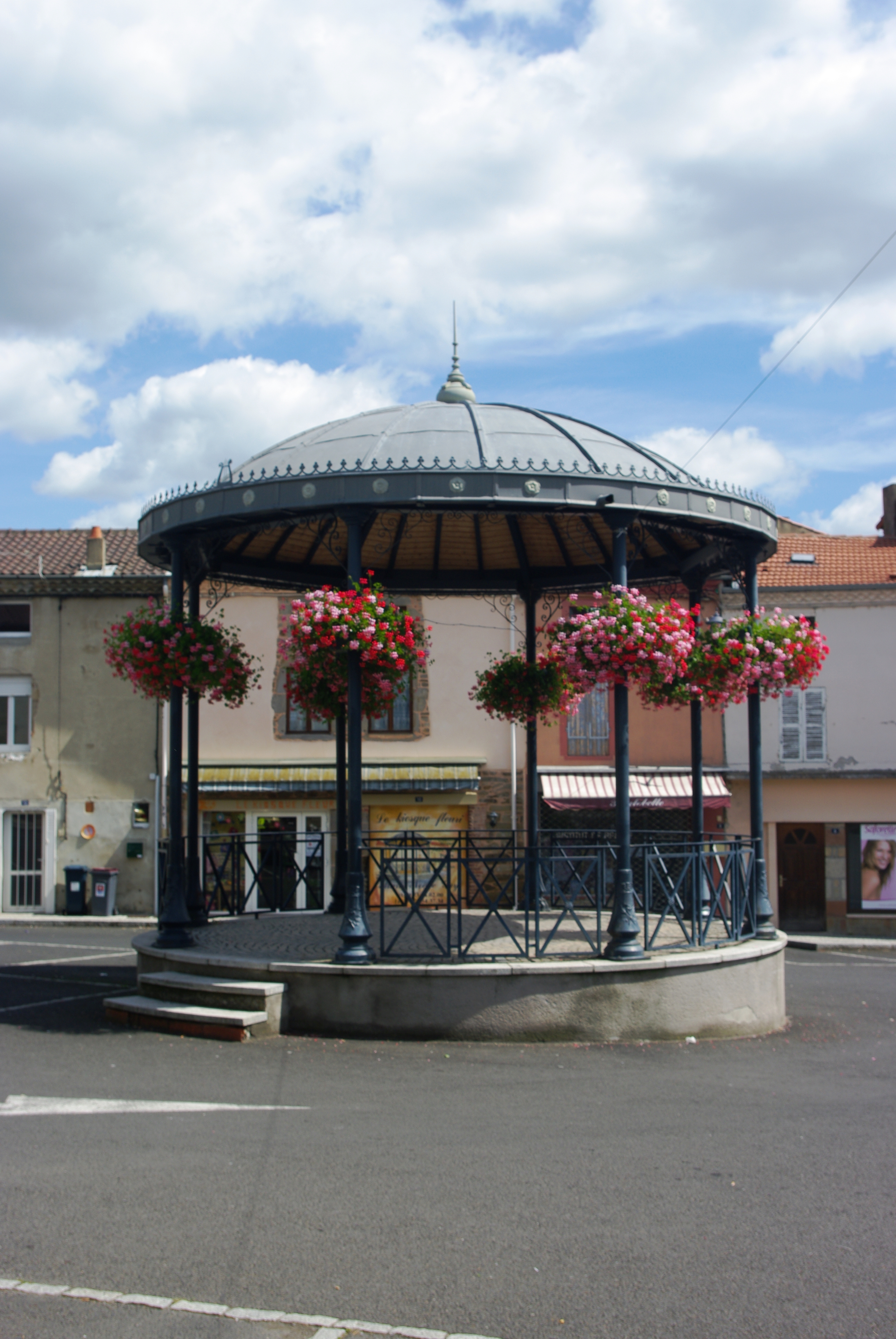
The kiosque Peynet of Brassac-les-Mines, smaller than its Valence counterpart.

A historical monument since 1982 and designed by the architect Eugène Poitoux, the Kiosque Peynet is a bandstand which inspired Raymond Peynet in 1942 with his famous "lovers". These "lovers" would travel the world and adorn many objects. Raymond Peynet worked on that momentum for many newspapers. After becoming famous, Peynet returned to Valence in April 1966, to baptise the kiosk which now bears his name.

The lovers of Peynet inspired the song Les amoureux des bancs publics of Georges Brassens. They were broken down into stamps in 1985 in France, cancelled by the post office of Saint-Valentin in Indre, each on 14 February, in postcards, dolls, in books, on medals, in statues (such as the one in Hiroshima in Japan). The little couple is sought by collectors around the world. Japan has two Peynet museums (Karuizawa and Sakuto), while in Hiroshima, a statue of the Lovers faces the memorial of the atomic bombing. There is also a kiosque and a museum dedicated to the artist in the small commune of Brassac-les-Mines. Isabelle Bard, the mother of Peynet, was born in Puy-de-Dôme.

=== Valence in film ===
The following list covers films which were fully or partially shot in Valence.

- 1968: Les Cracks directed by Alex Joffé, with Bourvil, Robert Hirsch, Monique Tarbès and Michel de Ré.
- 1974: Going Places directed by Bertrand Blier, with Gérard Depardieu, Patrick Dewaere, Miou-Miou and Jeanne Moreau.
- 1992: Riens du tout directed by Cédric Klapisch, with Fabrice Luchini, Daniel Berlioux, Marc Berman and Olivier Broche.
- 1994: Les Braqueuses directed by Jean-Paul Salomé, with Catherine Jacob, Clémentine Célarié, Alexandra Kazan and Nanou Garcia.
- 1996: Les Grands Ducs directed by Patrice Leconte, with Jean-Pierre Marielle, Philippe Noiret, Jean Rochefort and Michel Blanc.
- 1999: Une femme d'extérieur directed by Christophe Blanc, with Agnès Jaoui and Serge Riaboukine.
- 2001: Du côté des filles directed by Françoise Decaux-Thomele, with Clémentine Célarié, Sophie Guillemin, Catherine Mouchet and Édith Scob.
- 2005: Je vous trouve très beau directed by Isabelle Mergault, with Michel Blanc, Medeea Marinescu and Wladimir Yordanoff.
- 2008: Passe-passe directed by Tonie Marshall, with Nathalie Baye, Édouard Baer and Guy Marchand.
- 2009: Dans tes bras directed by Hubert Gillet, with Michèle Laroque, Martin Loizillon and Catherine Mouchet.
- 2011: All Our Desires directed by Philippe Lioret, with Vincent Lindon, Marie Gillain and Amandine Dewasmes.
- 2014: Three Hearts directed by Benoît Jacquot with Benoît Poelvoorde, Charlotte Gainsbourg, Chiara Mastroianni and Catherine Deneuve.

== Gallery ==
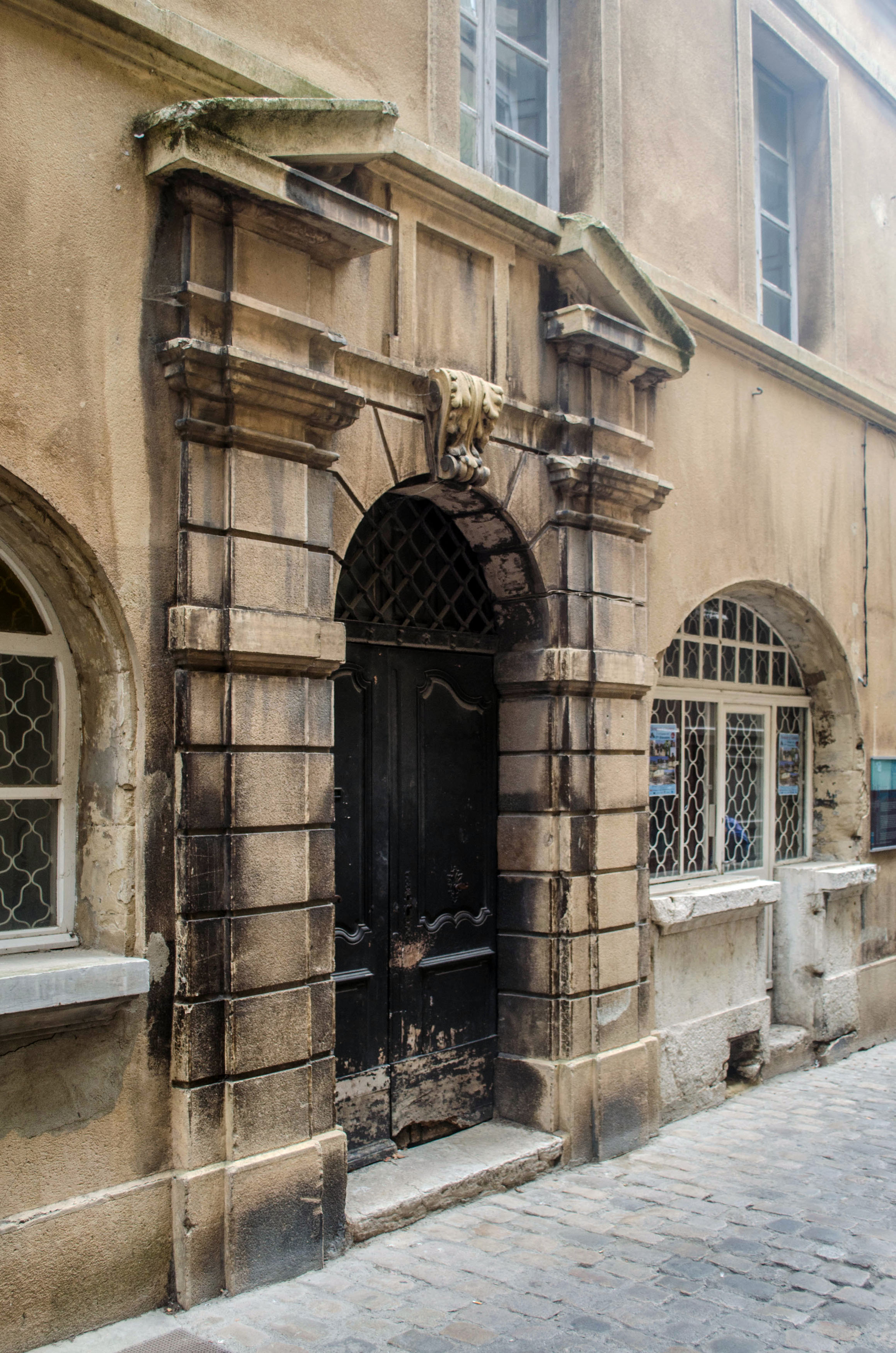
The Maison Dupré-Latour

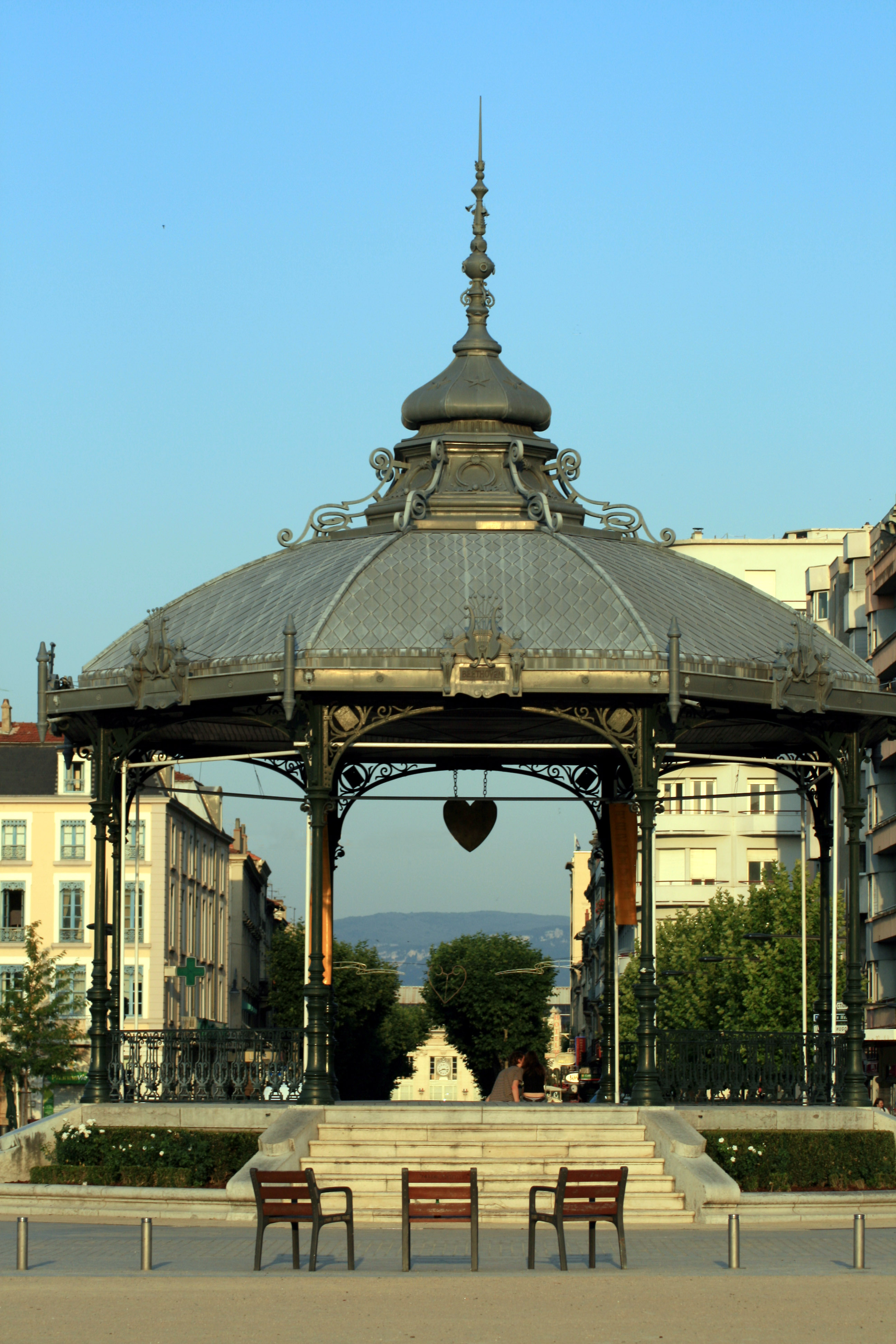
Kiosque Peynet on the Champ de Mars

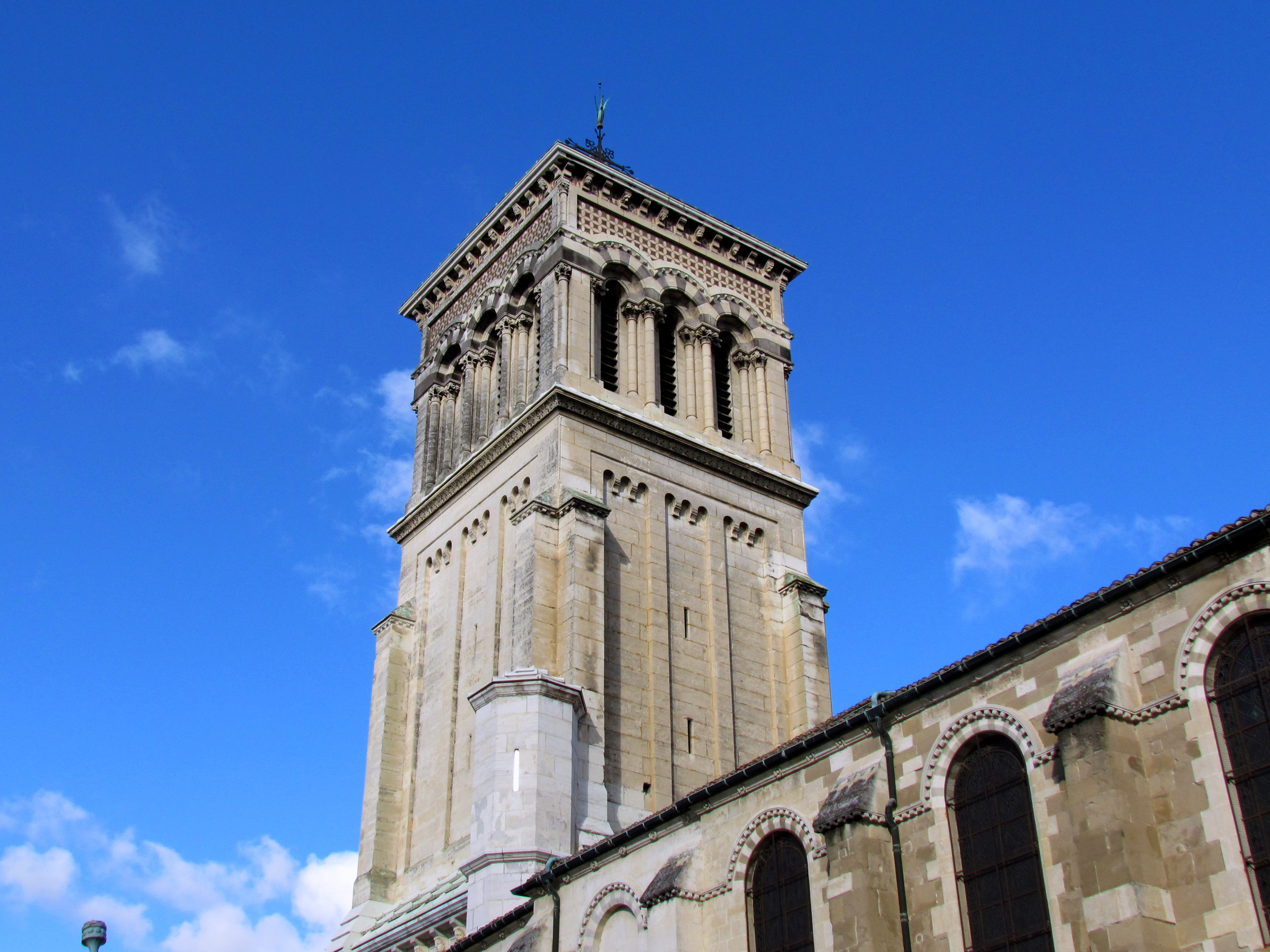
Bell tower of the Saint-Apollinaire Cathedral

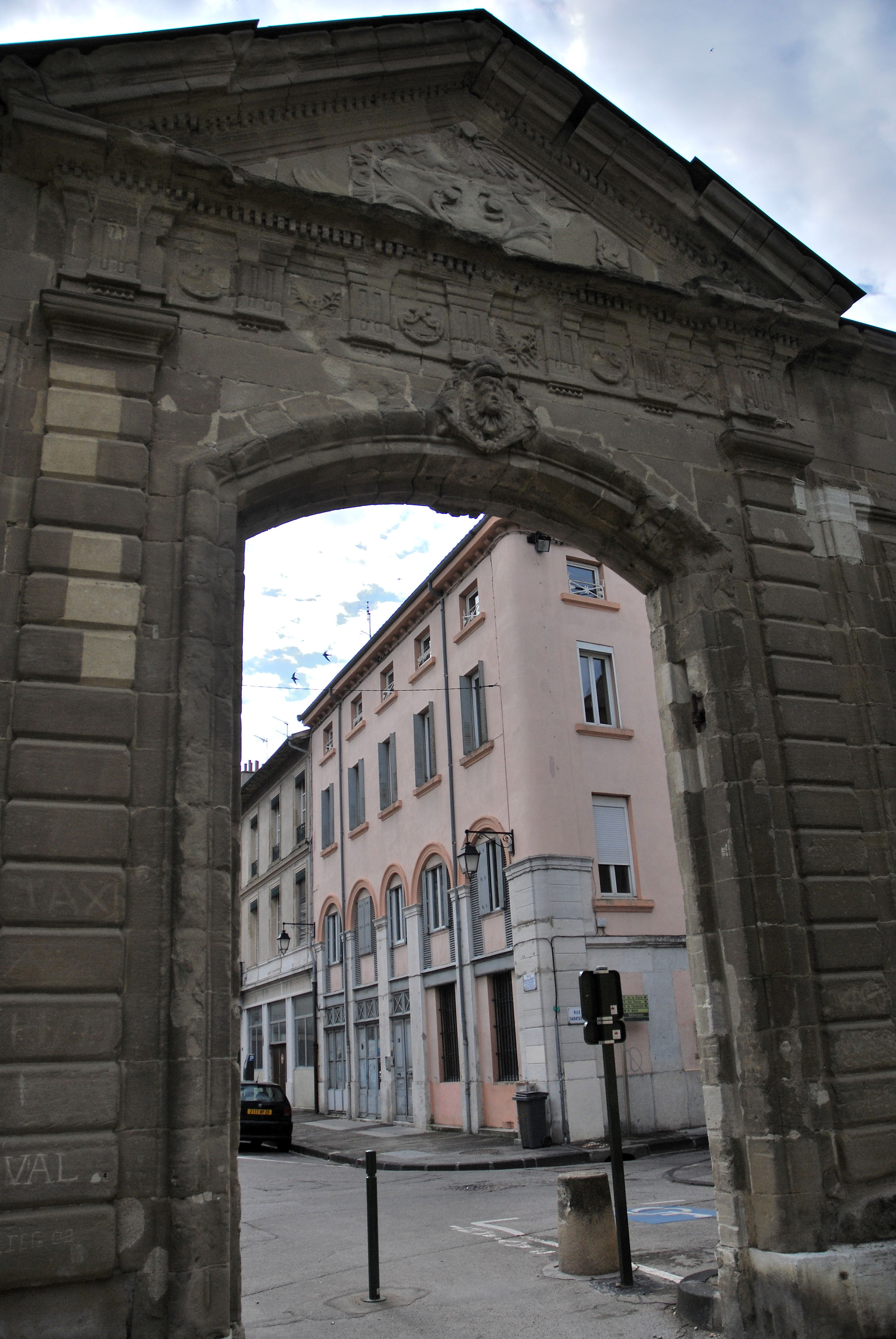
Gate of the former prefecture

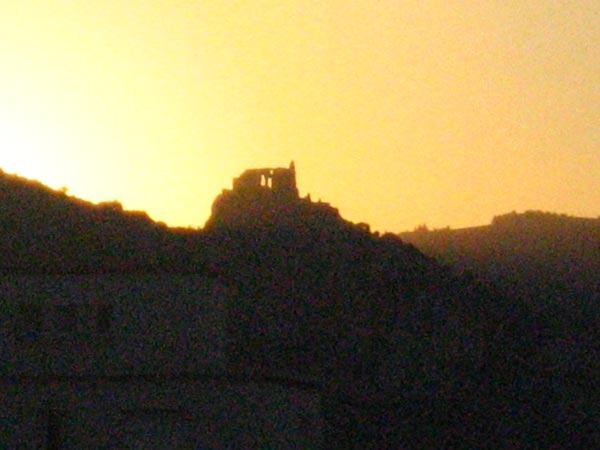
View of the Château de Crussol from the esplanade of the Champ de Mars
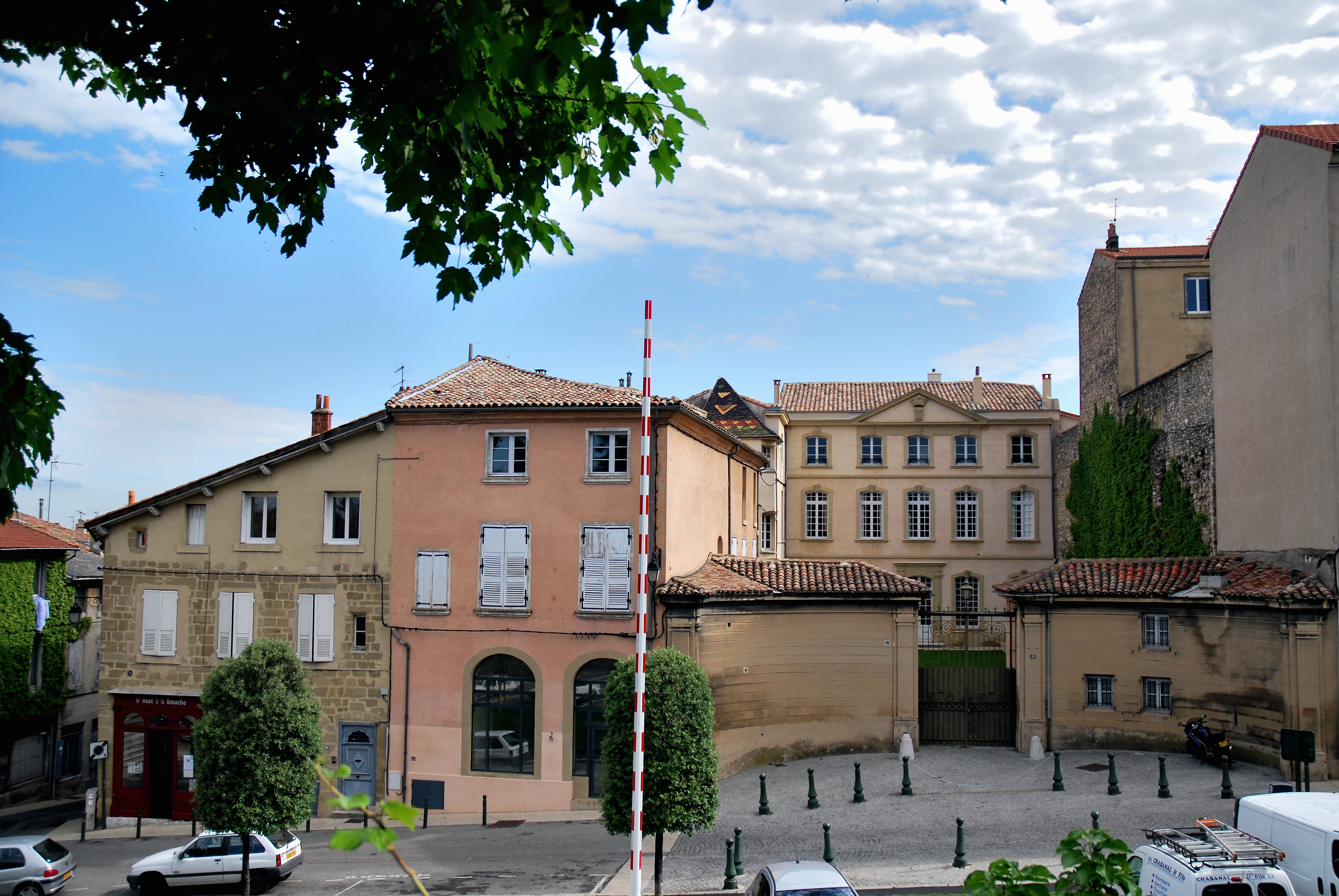
Côte des Chapeliers, home of the Marquis of Veynes.

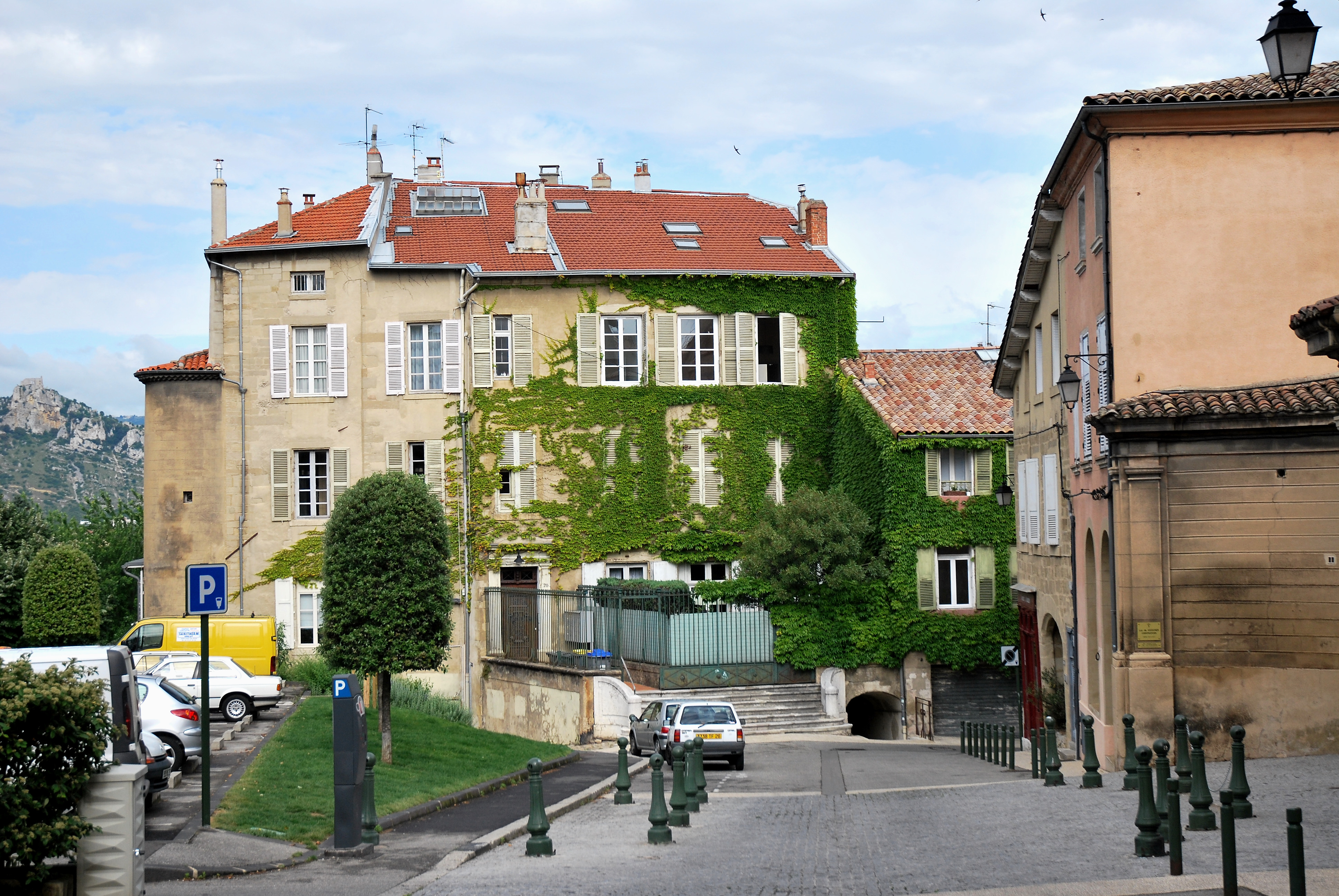
Côte des Chapeliers

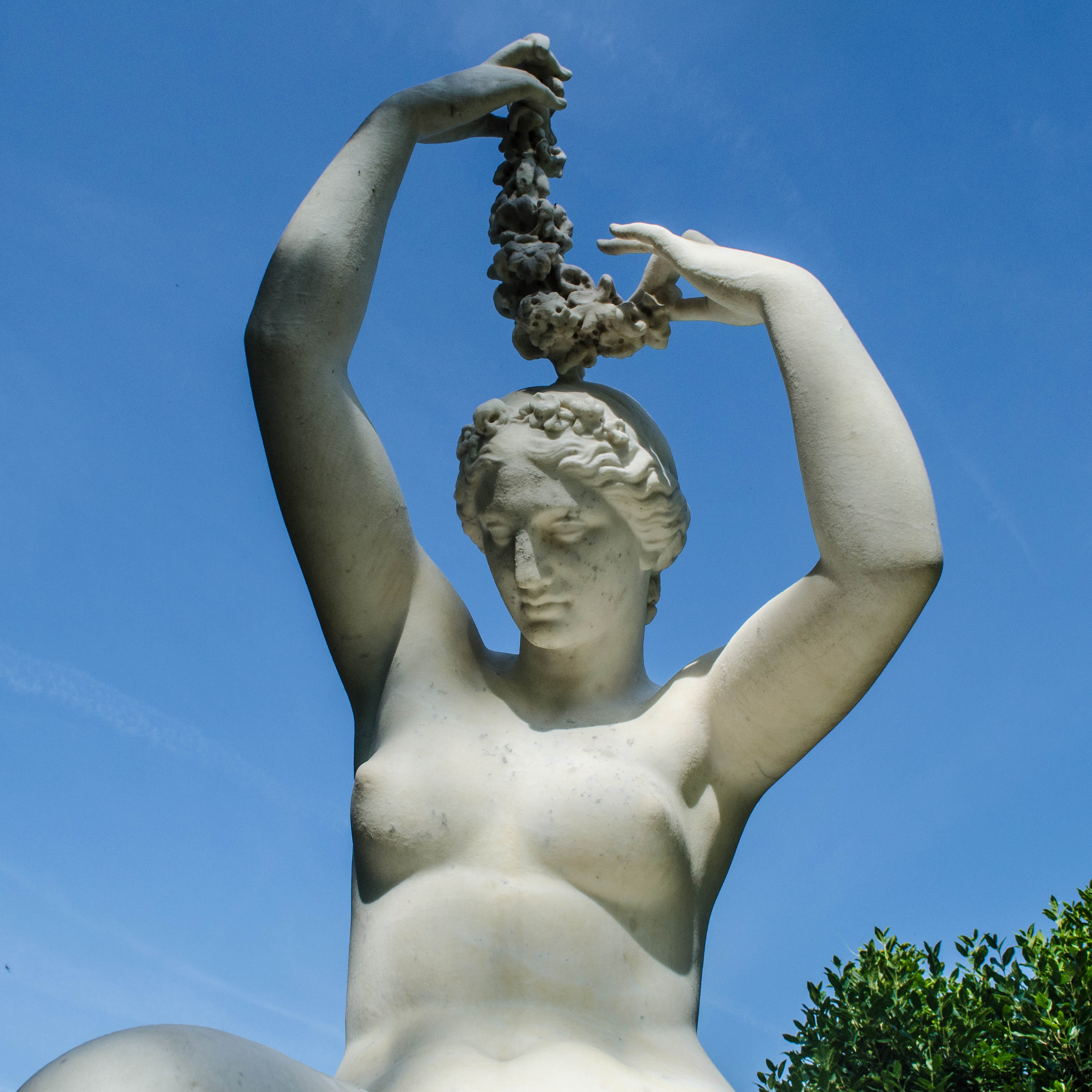
Sculpture in the garden of the Musée des beaux-arts

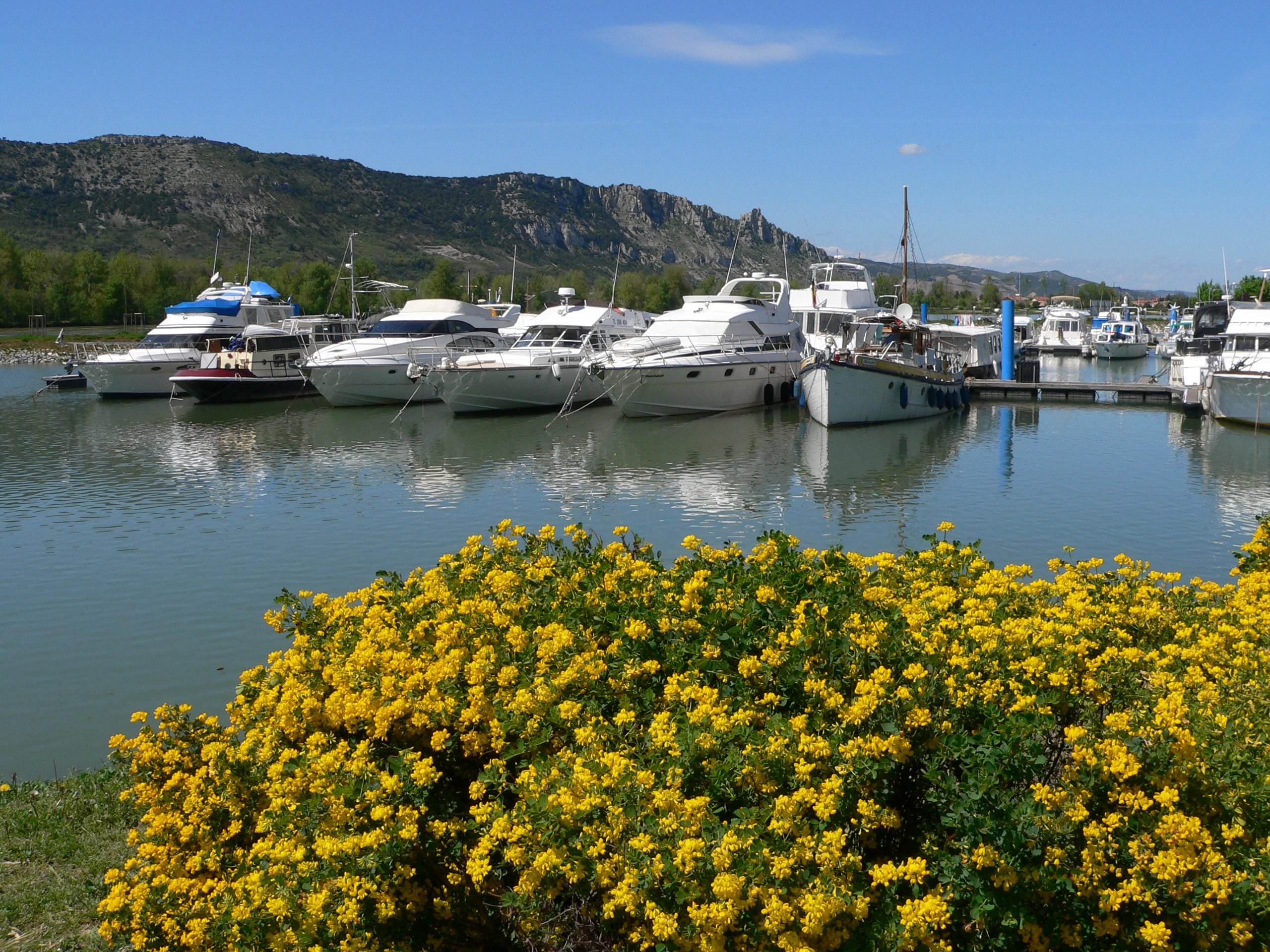
Port de l'Épervière

== See also ==
- Communes of the Drôme department
- Drôme
- List of prefectures of France
- Quarters of Valence
- List of historical monuments of Valence
- List of Bishops of Valence
- Urban area of Valence

== Bibliography ==
- Blanc, André (1973). Valence [Valence] (in French). Colmar-Ingersheim: Éditions SAEP.
- Blanc, André (1975). Valence à travers les hommes [Valence through the men] (in French). Valence: Éditions SOREPI.
- Bornecque, Robert. Histoire de Valence et de sa région: Die – Crest [History of Valence and its region: Die – Crest] (in French). Roanne: Éditions Horvath.
- Ravit, Philippe (2007). Le paysage valentinois, de la fondation de la colonie de Valentia (Valence) au 3e siecle ap J.-C [The city landscape, of the Foundation of the colony of Valentia (Valence) in the 3rd century AD] (in French). Lyon 3.
- Collective (1991). Valence [Valence] (in French). Ville de Valence et Office du tourisme.
- Despesse, Bernard-Marie (2004). Le Parc Jouvet au cœur de Valence [The Jouvet Park in the heart of Valence] (in French). Valence, Mémoire de la Drôme.
- Collective (2009). Valence, visages d'une ville [Valence faces of a city] (in French). Altal éditions.
- Despesse, Bernard-Marie (2010). Le Champ de Mars terrasse de Valence [The Champ de Mars terrace of Valence] (in French). Valence, Mémoire de la Drôme.
- Collective (2011). Il était une fois Châteauvert… [Once upon a time... Châteauvert] (in French). Valence, Mémoire de la Drôme.
- Balsan, Alain (2012). Valence 2000 ans d'histoire [Valence 2000 years of history] (in French). Valence, Mémoire de la Drôme.
- Despesse, Bernard-Marie (2013). La Sculpture-château d'eau de Philolaos à Valence [Sculpture-water tower of Philolaus in Valence] (in French). Valence, Mémoire de la Drôme.
