= Valence TGV station =

Railway station in Auvergne-Rhône-Alpes, France

Valence TGV Rhône Alpes Sud
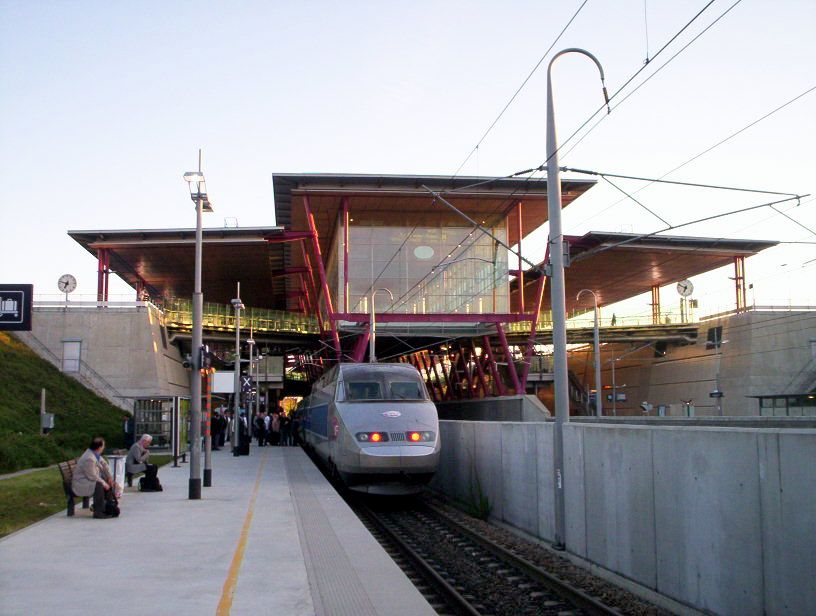

General information
- Location: Alixan, Drôme, Rhône-Alpes; France
- Coordinates: 44°59′30″N 4°58′43″E
- Owner: SNCF
- Operator: SNCF
- Lines: TGV Méditerranée; Valence–Moirans railway
- Platforms: 3 (TGV) + 2 (TER)
- Tracks: 5 (TGV) + 2 (TER)

Other information
- Station code: IATA: XHK

History
- Opened: 2001

Passengers
- 2024: 3,283,288
Services
Preceding station	SNCF	Following station
Paris-Lyon Terminus	TGV	Nîmes towards Montpellier
Paris-Lyon Terminus	TGV	Nîmes towards Barcelona Sants
Lyon-Part-Dieu Terminus	TGV	Nîmes towards Barcelona Sants
Lyon-Part-Dieu towards Brussels-South	TGV	Nîmes towards Montpellier
Lyon-Part-Dieu towards Lille-Europe	TGV	Nîmes towards Montpellier
Lyon-Part-Dieu towards Metz	TGV	Nîmes towards Montpellier
Lyon-Part-Dieu towards Luxembourg	TGV	Nîmes towards Montpellier
Lyon-Part-Dieu towards Nantes	TGV	Nîmes towards Montpellier
Lyon-Part-Dieu towards Brussels-South	TGV	Avignon TGV towards Marseille
Lyon-Part-Dieu towards Lille-Europe	TGV	Avignon TGV towards Nice-Ville
Lyon-Part-Dieu towards Paris-Lyon	TGV	Avignon TGV towards Marseille
Lyon-Part-Dieu towards Strasbourg	TGV	Avignon TGV towards Marseille
Lyon-Part-Dieu towards Rennes	TGV	Avignon TGV towards Marseille
Lyon-Part-Dieu towards Le Havre	TGV	Avignon TGV towards Marseille
Lyon-Part-Dieu towards Metz	TGV	Aix-en-Provence TGV towards Marseille
Preceding station	Ouigo	Following station
Lyon-Part-Dieu towards Tourcoing	Grande Vitesse	Nîmes-Pont-du-Gard towards Montpellier Sud de France
Paris-Lyon Terminus	Grande Vitesse	Nîmes towards Montpellier
Preceding station	TER Auvergne-Rhône-Alpes	Following station
Valence-Ville Terminus	2	Romans-Bourg-de-Péage towards Annecy or Geneva
Valence-Ville Terminus	61	Romans-Bourg-de-Péage towards Grenoble-Universités-Gières
Romans-Bourg-de-Péage Terminus	64	Valence-Ville towards Briançon
Preceding station	Eurostar	Following station
Avignon TGV towards Marseille-Saint-Charles	Eurostar (summer)	Brussels-South towards Amsterdam Centraal
Location

Valence TGV station (French: Gare de Valence TGV) IATA: XHK) is a railway station in Valence, France which offers regular TGV services. The station, located in eastern Valence (Alixan), is about ten kilometres north-east from the town centre, allowing through trains to pass at full speed. With its opening in 2001, the station has considerably shortened travel times for travellers throughout eastern France.

Valence TGV was built for and opened along with the LGV Méditerranée, which extends south from Valence to Marseille. The station is only 1 km south of the end of LGV Rhône-Alpes, which extends north from Valence to Lyon and, via the LGV Sud-Est, on to Paris in 2h11.

== Station ==
Valence TGV has some unique station architecture. Built primarily of reinforced concrete, one of the main features is the glass on all walls of the station building. The station is built on a slight incline, which makes it slightly harder for handicapped people to move around the building.

Valence TGV is a bi-level station, the top level is used for TER trains while the bottom level is used for TGV trains. The lower level, aligned roughly north–south, has 4 tracks: 2 in the centre allow through trains to pass without slowing, and 2 outer tracks are used for stopping TGV services. The upper level, aligned north-east to south-west, has 2 platforms for trains on the Valence–Moirans railway, a classic line which runs southwest to Valence city, and northeast to Moirans and Grenoble. There are regular shuttles from Valence TGV to Valence City station, in the city centre.

French highway RD 532 provides road access to the station, and two large carparks have been built at the station to allow passengers to park their car and ride the train.

== Train services ==
The station is served by the following services:

- High-speed services (TGV) Brussels Midi/Zuid – Paris-Charles de Gaulle Airport TGV – Lyon – Valence TGV – Avignon TGV – Marseille
- High-speed services (TGV) Lille – TGV Haute-Picardie – Paris-Charles de Gaulle Airport TGV – Lyon – Valence TGV – Avignon TGV – Marseille
- High-speed services (TGV) Brussels Midi/Zuid – Paris-Charles de Gaulle Airport TGV – Lyon – Valence TGV – Nîmes – Montpellier (- Béziers – Perpignan)
- High-speed services (TGV) Lille-Europe – TGV Haute-Picardie – Paris-Charles de Gaulle Airport TGV – Lyon – Valence TGV – Nîmes – Montpellier
- High-speed services (TGV) Paris-Gare de Lyon – Valence TGV – Nîmes – Montpellier (- Béziers)
- High-speed services (TGV) Paris-Gare de Lyon – Valence TGV – Nîmes – Montpellier – Perpignan – Barcelona
- High-speed services (TGV) Lyon – Nîmes – Montpellier – Perpignan – Barcelona
- High-speed services (TGV) Lyon – Valence TGV – Aix-en-Provence TGV – Marseille – Nice
- High-speed services (TGV) Lyon – Nîmes – Montpellier – Toulouse
- High-speed services (TGV) Metz/Strasbourg – Dijon – Lyon – Nîmes – Montpellier/Marseille
- High-speed services (TGV) Luxembourg – Metz – Strasbourg – Mulhouse – Besançon – Dijon – Lyon – Valence TGV – Avignon TGV – Marseille/Montpellier
- High-speed services (TGV) Rennes – Le Mans – Lyon – Valence TGV – Avignon TGV – Marseille
- High-speed services (TGV) Le Havre – Rouen – Lyon – Valence TGV – Avignon TGV – Marseille
- High-speed services (TGV) Rennes – Le Mans – Lyon – Valence TGV – Nîmes – Montpellier
- High-speed services (TGV) Nantes – Angers – Le Mans – Lyon – Valence TGV – Nîmes – Montpellier
- High-speed service (Thalys) Amsterdam – Brussels Midi/Zuid – Paris-Charles de Gaulle Airport TGV – Valence TGV – Avignon TGV – Marseille (Summer Saturdays only)
- High-speed services (Ouigo) Tourcoing – Paris-Charles de Gaulle Airport TGV – Lyon – Valence TGV – Nîmes-Pont-du-Gard – Montpellier Sud de France
- High-speed services (Ouigo) Paris-Gare de Lyon – Valence TGV – Nîmes – Montpellier
- Local services (TER Auvergne-Rhône-Alpes) Valence – Grenoble
- Local services (TER Auvergne-Rhône-Alpes) Valence – Grenoble – Chambéry – Aix-les-Bains – Annecy/Geneve

A limited number of services operate via Lyon Saint-Exupéry Airport rather than Lyon-Part-Dieu.

== Travel times ==
Travel times have been decreased dramatically using Valence TGV station.

Direct TGV services from Valence TGV, best travel time (frequencies)

- Aéroport Charles de Gaulle 2 TGV, 2h29 to 2h46 (7 per day)
- Aix-en-Provence TGV, 0h47 to 1h00 (4 per day)
- Amsterdam Centraal Thalys summer service every Saturday from end of June to end of August.
- Bordeaux, 6h01 to 6h27 (5 per day, change at Montpellier)
- Brussels, 4h06 to 4h41 (4 per day)
- Dijon, 2h16 (2 to 4 per day)
- Genève-Cornavin, 2h27 (1 per day), 3h05 via direct TER service
- Le Creusot TGV, 1h28 (4 per week)
- Le Havre, 5h11 (1 per day)
- Lille-Europe, 3h35 to 3h51 (7 per day)
- Lyon Part-Dieu, 00h34
- Lyon Saint Exupéry TGV, 00h25 (1 per day)
- Mantes-la-Jolie, 3h57 (1 per day)
- Marne la Vallée (Disneyland), 2h15 to 2h32 (7 per day)
- Marseille-Saint-Charles, 0h58 (12 per day)
- Massy TGV, 2h46 to 3h12 (3 per day)
- Montpellier, 1h09
- Nantes, 5h19 (1 per day)
- Nice-Ville, 3h49 (4 per day)
- Nîmes, 0h43
- Paris-Gare de Lyon, 2h15 (8 per day)
- Perpignan, 2h46 (4 per day)
- Rennes, 4h57 (2 per day)
- Rouen, 4h24 (1 per day)
- TGV Haute Picardie, 2h59 (3 per day)
- Toulouse, 3h23 (1 per day)
- Versailles Chantiers, 3h05 (1 per day)

== Bus services ==
- Valence TGV – Valence
- Valence TGV – Valence – Le Pouzin – Privas – Aubenas
- Valence TGV – Romans-Bourg-de-Péage
- Valence TGV – Grenoble
- Valence TGV – Montelimar – Aubenas – Les Vans
- Valence TGV – Valence – Die – Gap – Briançon
