= Avignon TGV station =

High-speed rail station in Avignon, France

Avignon
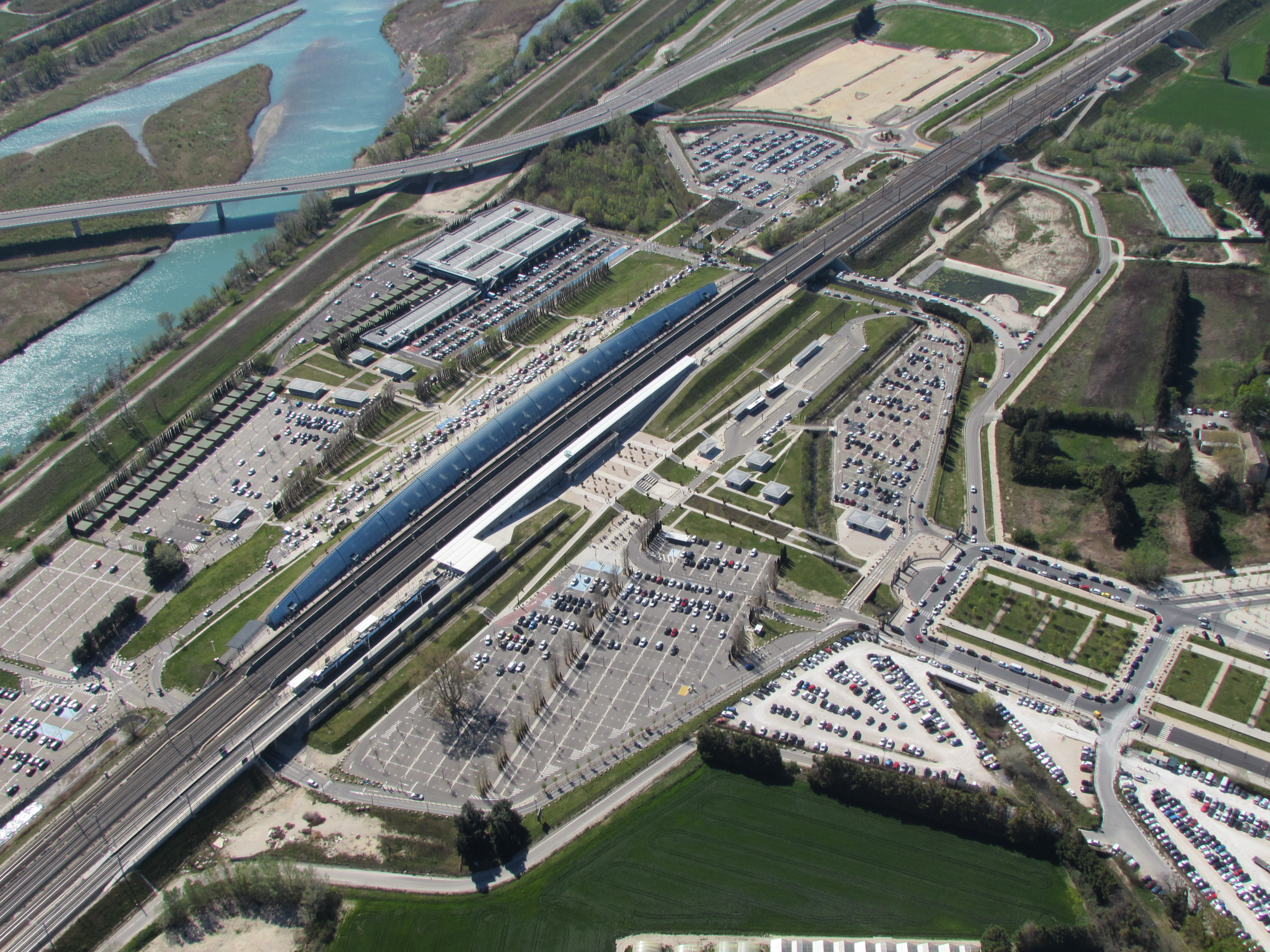
- Sky view of Avignon TGV railway station

General information
- Location: Avignon, Vaucluse, France
- Coordinates: 43°55′18″N 4°47′9″E
- Lines: LGV Méditerranée; Avignon-Centre–Avignon TGV railway
- Platforms: 4 (2 for TER and 2 for TGV)
- Tracks: 6

Construction
- Structure type: Aboveground

History
- Opened: 10 June 2001

Passengers
- 2024: 4,258,709
Services
Preceding station	SNCF	Following station
Paris-Lyon Terminus	TGV inOui	Toulon Terminus
Valence TGV towards Paris-Lyon	TGV inOui	Aix-en-Provence TGV towards Marseille
Valence TGV towards Lyon-Part-Dieu	TGV inOui	Aix-en-Provence TGV towards Nice-Ville
Lyon-Part-Dieu towards Frankfurt	TGV inOui	Aix-en-Provence TGV towards Marseille
Lyon-Part-Dieu towards Nancy-Ville	TGV inOui	Aix-en-Provence TGV towards Nice-Ville
Valence TGV towards Luxembourg	TGV inOui	Aix-en-Provence TGV towards Marseille
Valence TGV towards Le Havre	TGV inOui	Marseille Terminus
Lyon-Part-Dieu towards Lausanne	TGV Lyria Seasonal service	Aix-en-Provence TGV towards Marseille
Preceding station	Eurostar	Following station
Aix-en-Provence towards Marseille-Saint-Charles	Eurostar (summer)	Valence TGV towards Amsterdam Centraal
Preceding station	Renfe Operadora	Following station
Nîmes towards Madrid Atocha	AVE	Aix-en-Provence TGV towards Marseille-St-Charles
Preceding station	DB Fernverkehr	Following station
Aix-en-Provence TGV towards Marseille	ICE/TGV 84	Lyon-Part-Dieu towards Frankfurt (Main) Hbf
Preceding station	Ouigo	Following station
Lyon-Saint-Exupéry TGV towards Lille-Flandres	Grande Vitesse	Aix-en-Provence TGV towards Marseille
Paris-Lyon Terminus	Grande Vitesse	Aix-en-Provence TGV towards Marseille
Preceding station	TER PACA	Following station
Terminus	9	Avignon-Centre towards Marseille
Avignon-Centre towards Carpentras	9bis	Terminus
Location

Avignon TGV (IATA: XZN) is a railway station located in Avignon, France. It was opened on 10 June 2001 and is located on the LGV Méditerranée high-speed line and Avignon-Centre–Avignon TGV railway. The train services are operated by the SNCF, limited services by Spanish national operator, Renfe, and some services by the italian operator, Trenitalia. The station is located 6 km south of the city centre.

== Overview ==
This station has two platforms for trains calling at the station, with two through lines. This allows trains not stopping at Avignon to pass through at full speed, but away from passenger platforms.

This station, inaugurated in 2001, was designed by the cabinet of architecture of the SNCF under the direction of Jean-Marie Duthilleul and Jean-François Blassel. It has a 340 m (1,115 ft)-long glazed roof that has been compared to that of a cathedral.

On 15 December 2013 a link line between Avignon's city station and Avignon's high speed station opened, with a regular shuttle service operating between the two.

== Train services ==
The station is served by the following services:

From Avignon TGV train services depart to major French cities such as: Paris, Lyon, Marseille, Cannes, Nice, Dijon, Strasbourg, Montpellier, Nantes, Rennes and Lille.

International services operate to Belgium: Brussels, Antwerp (in summer), Germany: Frankfurt, Spain: Barcelona, Madrid, Switzerland: Geneva, Lausanne and The Netherlands: Amsterdam (in summer).

- High-speed services (TGV) Paris - Avignon - Marseille
- High-speed services (TGV) Paris - Avignon - Cannes - Nice
- High-speed services (TGV Ouigo) Marne-la-Vallée - Lyon Saint-Exupéry - Avignon - Marseille
- High-speed services (TGV) Lille - Aeroport CDG - Lyon - Avignon - Marseille
- High-speed services (TGV) Brussels - Lille - Aeroport CDG - Lyon - Avignon - Marseille
- High-speed services (TGV/ICE) Frankfurt - Strasbourg - Mulhouse - Belfort - Lyon - Avignon - Marseille
- High-speed services (TGV) Strasbourg - Mulhouse - Belfort - Lyon - Avignon - Marseille
- High-speed services (TGV) Nancy - Strasbourg - Besançon - Dijon - Lyon - Avignon - Marseille - Cannes - Nice
- High-speed services (TGV) Nantes - Angers - Tours - Lyon - Avignon - Marseille
- High-speed services (TGV) Rennes - Le Mans - Lyon - Avignon - Marseille
- High-speed services (TGV ) Le Havre - Rouen - Lyon - Valence - Avignon - Marseille
- High-speed services (TGV Lyria) Lausanne - Geneva - Lyon - Avignon - Marseille (Summer)
- High-speed services (AVE) Madrid - Barcelona - Perpignan - Montpellier - Avignon - Marseille
- High-speed services (Eurostar) Amsterdam - Rotterdam - Antwerp - Brussels - Avignon - Aix-en-Provence - Marseille (Summer Saturdays)
- Shuttle services (TER PACA) Avignon - Avignon TGV
- Local services (TER PACA) Marseille - Miramas - Cavaillon - Avignon - Avignon TGV
- Local services (TER PACA) Carpentras - Avignon - Avignon TGV

Additionally in the summer months Thalys provide services between Amsterdam and Brussels.

== Trivia ==
Parts of the 2007 film "Mr Bean's Holiday" were shot at the Avignon station.

== Gallery ==
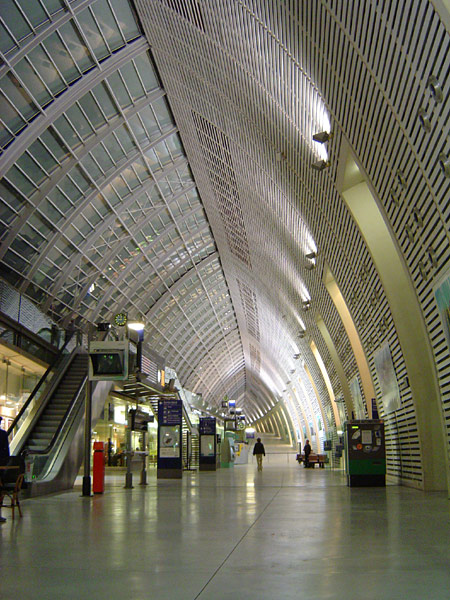
The inside of the station.

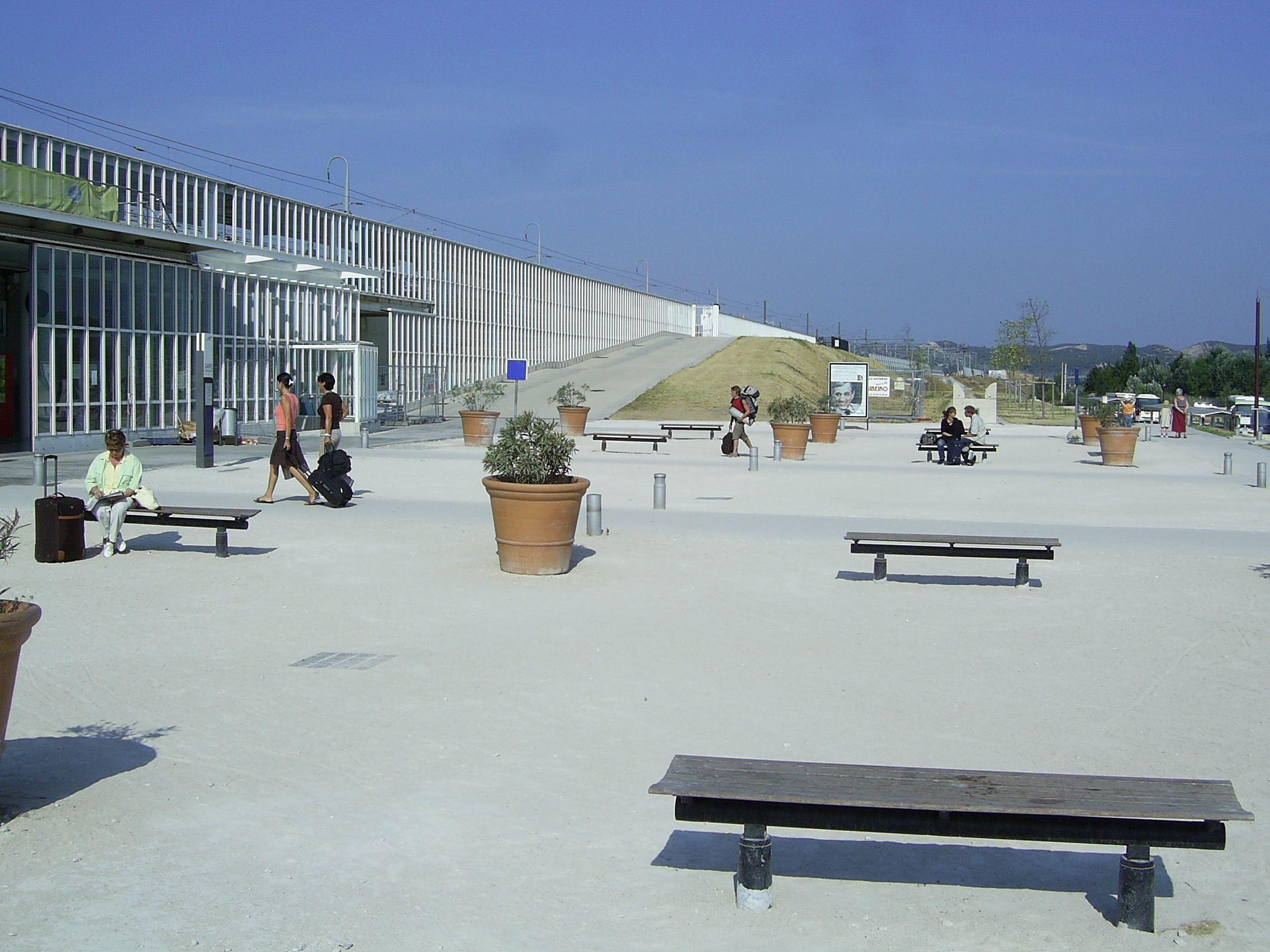
The entrance of the station.

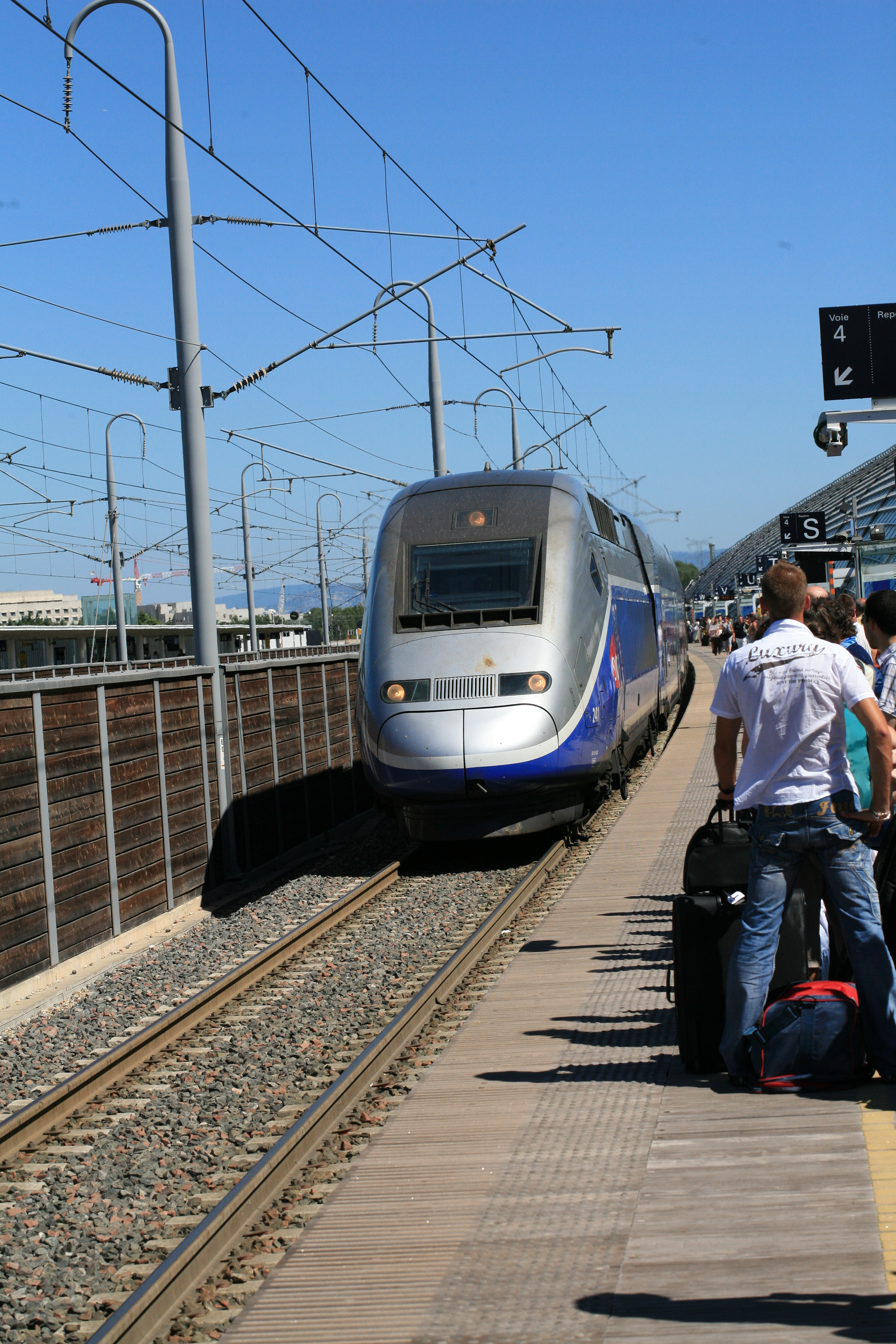
A TGV at the station

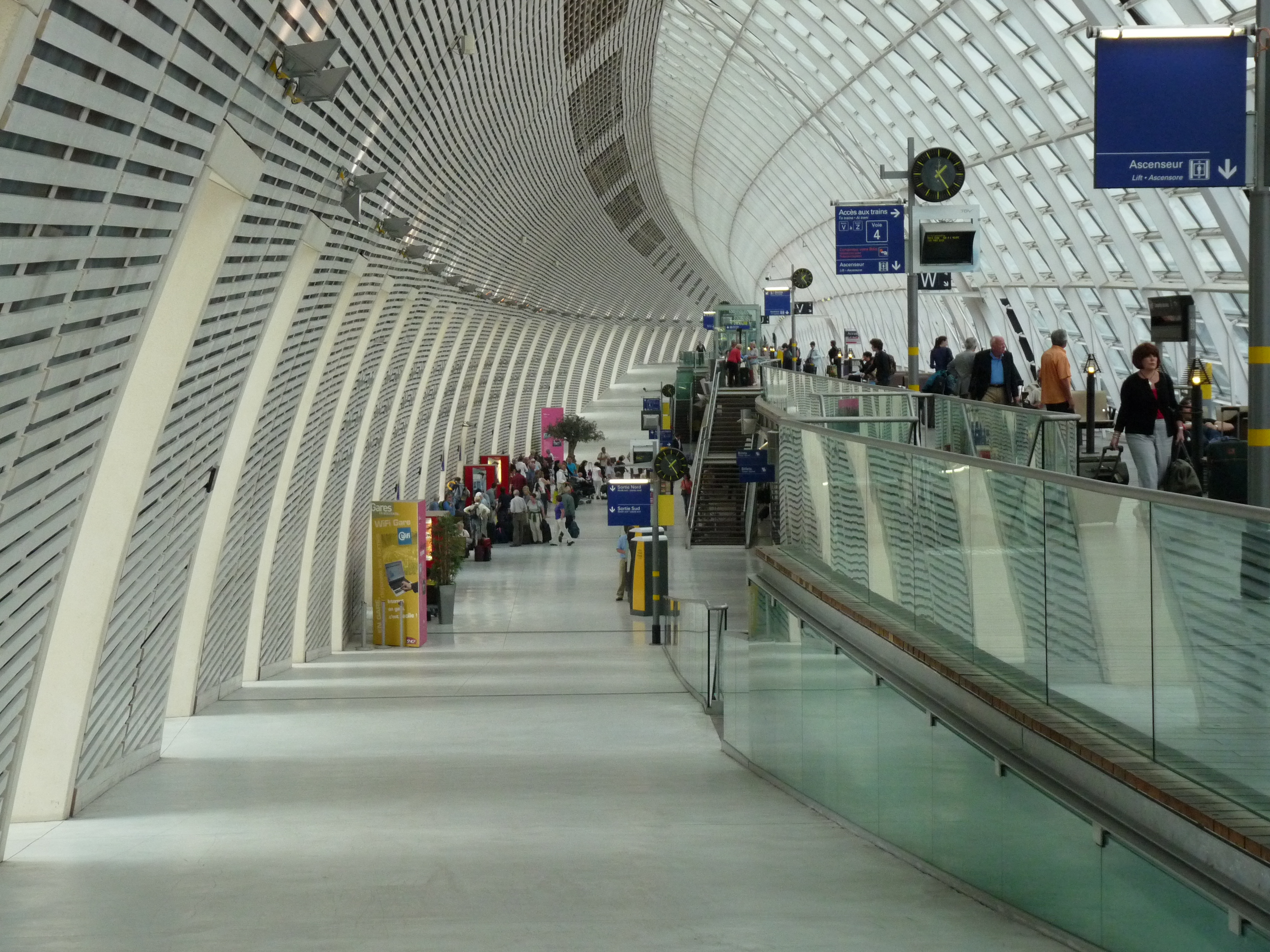
Main concourse

== See also ==
- List of TGV stations
