= LGV Méditerranée =

French high-speed railway

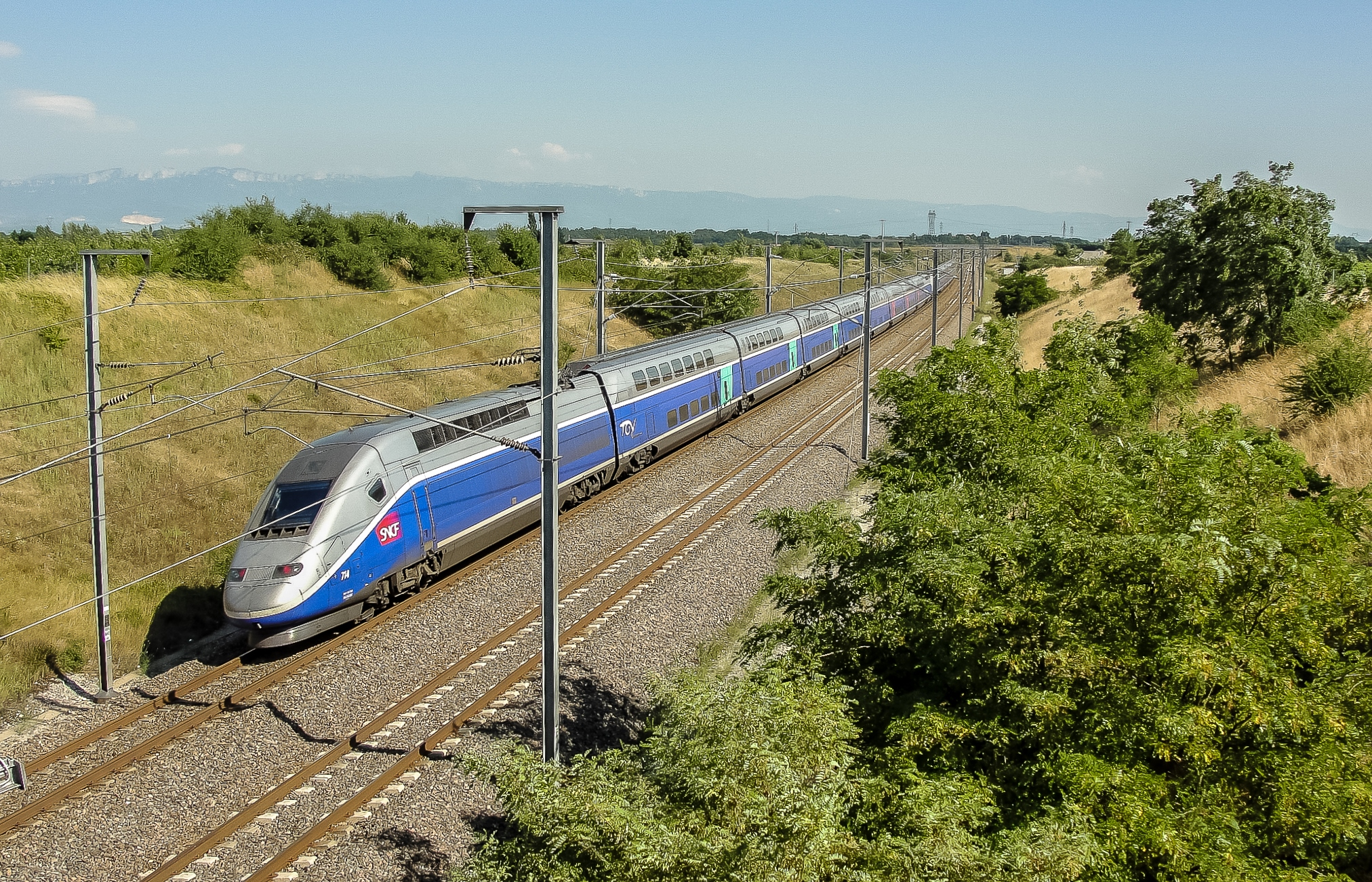
- SNCF TGV Duplex near Valence, Drôme

Overview
- Status: Operational
- Owner: SNCF Réseau
- Locale: Auvergne-Rhône-Alpes, Occitanie, Provence-Alpes-Côte d'Azur, France
- Termini: Valence TGV station; Eastern branch: Marseille Western branch: Nîmes

Service
- System: SNCF
- Operator(s): SNCF; Eurostar

History
- Opened: 7 June 2001

Technical
- Line length: 216 km (134 mi) + 28 km (17 mi) (western branch)
- Num of tracks: Double track
- Track gauge: 1,435 mm (4 ft 8 1/2 in) standard gauge
- Electrification: 25 kV 50 Hz
- Operating speed: 320 km/h (200 mph)
- Signalling: TVM 430

The LGV Méditerranée (French: Ligne à Grande Vitesse; English: Mediterranean high-speed line) is a 250-kilometre-long (160-mile) French high-speed rail line running from north to south between Saint-Marcel-lès-Valence, Drôme and Marseille, Bouches-du-Rhône, also featuring a connection to Nîmes, Gard to the west.

It connects the regions of Provence-Alpes-Côte d'Azur and Occitanie to the LGV Rhône-Alpes and from there onto Lyon and the north of France. Construction costs rose to €3.8 billion; the line entered service in 2001 following an official opening by President Jacques Chirac. The commencement of service on the line has led to a reversal of the respective airplane and train markets: by making Marseille reachable in three hours from Paris—a distance of over 750 kilometres (470 mi)—the train now handles two-thirds of all journeys on that route. LGVs Méditerranée, Rhône-Alpes and Sud-Est, when completed, also received their official nickname, the City To Coast (C2C) Highway ("Ville à la Mer").

The line features the Tunnel de Marseille, allowing it to enter Marseille underground, the longest railway tunnel wholly located in France, at 7.8 km (4.8 mi).

== Route ==
The LGV Méditerranée begins in the southeast at Saint-Marcel-lès-Valence, as the extension of the LGV Rhône-Alpes. The new Valence TGV station lies at the interchange with the regular Valence–Grenoble line, allowing rapid connections towards Valence, Romans-sur-Isère and Grenoble. At Crest, an emergency link is provided to the Briançon–Loriol line. The LGV then approaches the Rhône, rejoining the A7 autoroute at Montélimar. After crossing the Canal de Donzère-Mondragon, the line connects to the regular network by an emergency link situated between Pierrelatte and Lapalud.

Spanning the Rhône three times (twice at Mornas, once north of Roquemaure), the LGV continues to Les Angles, where a triangle allows access to the southwest and southeast. The southwest branch is generally thought of as the beginning of a future LGV Languedoc-Roussillon, joining the regular Avignon–Nîmes line 25 kilometres (16 mi) later at Redessan and since 2017 the LGV Nîmes–Montpellier. The southeast branch crosses the Rhône again on two parallel viaducts and serves the new Avignon TGV station, then follows the Durance which it crosses at Orgon.

At Ventabren, a 1.73 kilometres (1.07 mi) viaduct extends across the A8 autoroute, the D10 and the Canal de Provence. The line then dives southward, serving the new Aix-en-Provence TGV station, traverses the 8 kilometres (5.0 mi) long Tunnel de Marseille and re-joins the regular network at the entry to Marseille.

== Stations ==
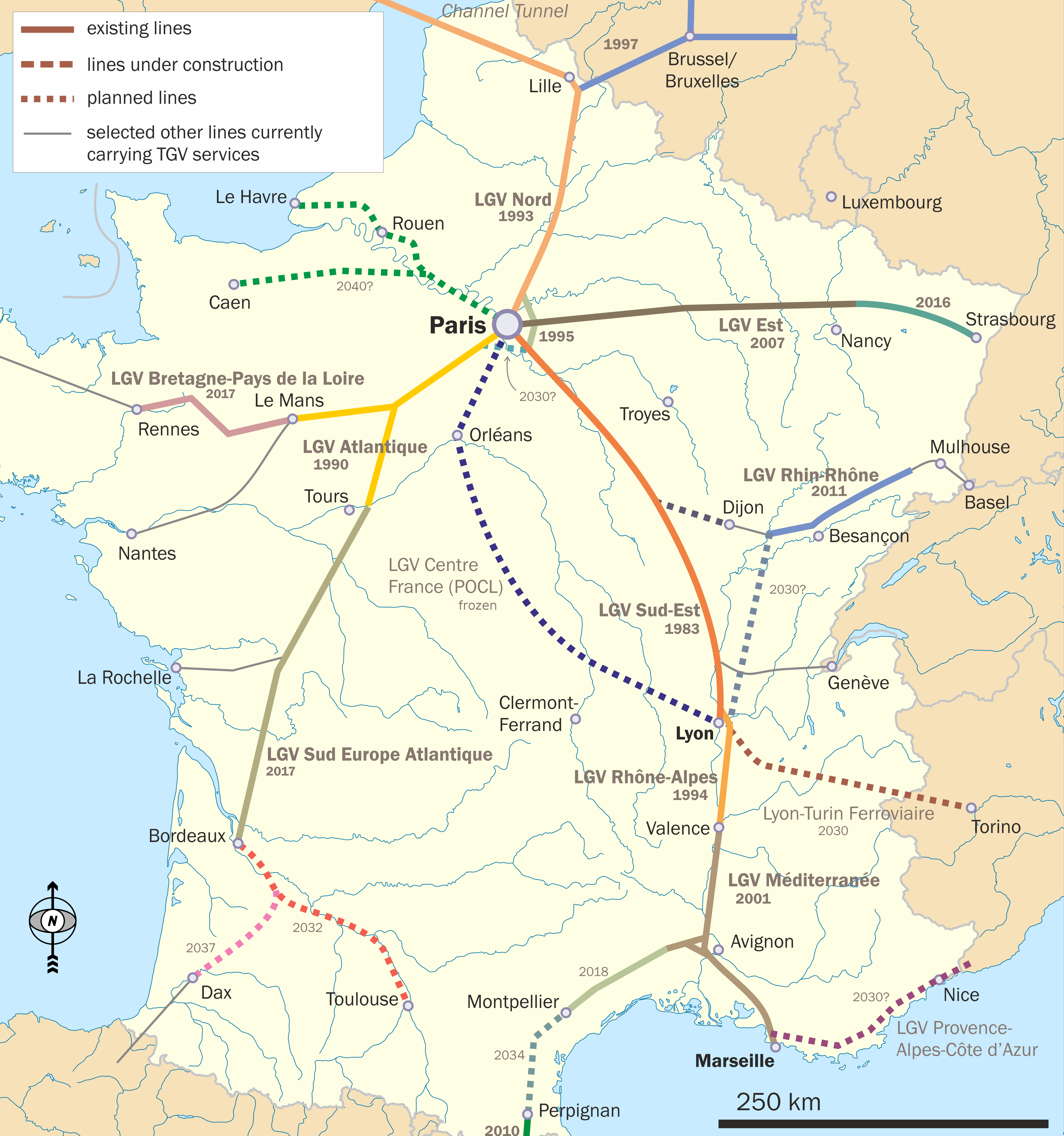
Overall TGV system map showing the route of the LGV Méditerranée and connections with other lines.

- Gare de Valence TGV at Saint-Marcel-lès-Valence; a unique two-level station (below, TGVs; above, TERs) which allows rapid connections towards Valence, Grenoble and Romans-sur-Isère
- Gare d'Avignon TGV south of Avignon; its proximity to the city centre has ensured its popularity. An enhancement to the station allowed it to be served by local services connecting to Avignon's central station, amongst others.
- Gare d'Aix-en-Provence TGV near the Réaltor reservoir, halfway between Aix-en-Provence and Marseille Airport; this station has proved more popular than expected and serves the north of the Marseille area. It is also recommended by agents for rail travellors planning to go further by ship from the harbours in the area of Fos-Lavera-Port de Bouc, in preference to the TGV station in Marseille. Gare d'Aix TGV has a road connection to Aix-en-Provence, but no classic rail connection as with Valence TGV.

== Controversies ==
- Numerous protests, particularly from well connected wine growers of the Rhône Valley, made President Mitterrand force alterations to the route; the original path would have kept to the left bank of the river, while the final route ended up skirting the river, crossing it back and forth four times, at a higher construction cost.
- The nearly 250 kilometres (160 mi) long line currently has no regularly used connection to the classic train network (unless one considers the southwest branch as a connector). Numerous connections had however been proposed:
  - a link at Saint-Marcel-lès-Valence between the LGV (southwards) and the regular line (eastwards), accompanied by the electrification of the Valence-Grenoble line. This would permit direct connections between Grenoble and the Mediterranean; instead, passengers traveling between Marseille and Grenoble must change at Valence-TGV; with the Valence to Geneva line through Grenoble now electrified, this link becomes more attractive and a connection is considered for the near-future; another link from the LGV (southwards) to the regular line (towards Valence) would have enabled service to Valence central station from the south;
  - a link at Roquemaure from the north towards Avignon would not only have enabled service to Avignon central station, but would have enabled faster service for Arles. A link south of Avignon would equally have permitted the linking of Avignon central station with Marseille in 25 minutes
  - the regular use of the existing link at Pierrelatte would have enabled rapid service to Orange from the north, as well as Avignon and Arles, given that no link was created at Roquemaure
  - a link at Orgon with the Avignon-Miramas line via Cavaillon would have enabled service to Salon-de-Provence, Miramas and Istres from the north

== Journey times ==
=== From Paris ===
- Paris–Lyon-Saint Exupéry: 1:50
- Paris–Valence TGV: 2:16

==== Towards Nice ====
- Paris–Avignon TGV: 2:40
- Paris–Aix-en-Provence TGV: 2:55
- Paris–Marseille: 3:07
- Paris–Toulon: 3:55
- Paris–Toulon: 4:15
- Paris–Saint-Raphaël: 5:00
- Paris–Cannes: 5:00
- Paris–Nice: 5:35–6:00

==== Towards Perpignan ====
- Paris–Nîmes-Centre or Nimes Pont du Gard: 3:00
- Paris–Montpellier-Saint-Roch or Montpellier Sud de France: 3:15–3:30
- Paris–Béziers: 4:00
- Paris–Perpignan: 5:00

=== Interregional ===
==== From Lyon ====
- Lyon–Marseille: 1:40
- Lyon–Toulouse: 4:30
- Lille–Nice: 7:09
- Metz–Nice: 9:15

=== From other countries ===
==== Switzerland ====
- Geneva–Marseille: 3:30

== See also ==
- TGV
- High-speed rail in France
