= Cimalp =

Sportswear and outdoor equipment brand

- Company type: Private
- Founded: 1964; 62 years ago
- Founder: Paul Sailler
- Headquarters: Saint-Marcel-lès-Valence, France
- Key people: Raymond Marsanne; Lionel Marsanne
- Owner: Manufacture Drômoise de Confection
- Website: www.cimalp.com

Cimalp is a French brand of sportswear and outdoor equipment founded in 1964. In 2025, the company became the official supplier of the French Federation of Mountaineering and Climbing.

== History ==
Cimalp was founded in 1964 by Paul Sailler, a mountaineer from the Isère region. The brand introduced its first stretchable alpine pants in collaboration with Nemours textiles.

In the 1970s, Cimalp became known for its stretch corduroy knickers, which were used in various expeditions. In 1991, Cimalp was acquired by Manufacture Drômoise de Confection, a company led by Raymond Marsanne at the time. In 2008, Lionel Marsanne, Raymond Marsanne's son, took over the company.

In 2016, Cimalp launched its first Trail team, featuring 12 athletes, including Marie Dorin-Habert and Muriel Hurtis.

In early 2023, Cimalp announced plans to establish a new facility in Saint-Marcel-lès-Valence, Drôme. The facility will house offices, a retail store, and a logistics center.

== Sponsorships ==
Teams and athletes using Cimalp equipment are:

=== Trail running ===
- (Republic of Ireland) Laura O'Driscoll
- (Republic of Ireland) Sean Clifford

=== Adventure ===
- (France) Thierry Corbarieu
- (Germany) Rico Gumpinger

=== Mountaineering ===
- (France) Frédéric Souchon
- (France) Kilian Moni
- (France) Ilona Serrar
- (France) Hubert Boixeda

=== Ski ===
- (Italy) Matteo Eydallin
