= Aix-en-Provence station =

Railway station in Aix-en-Provence, France

Coordinates: 43°31′23″N 5°26′42″E

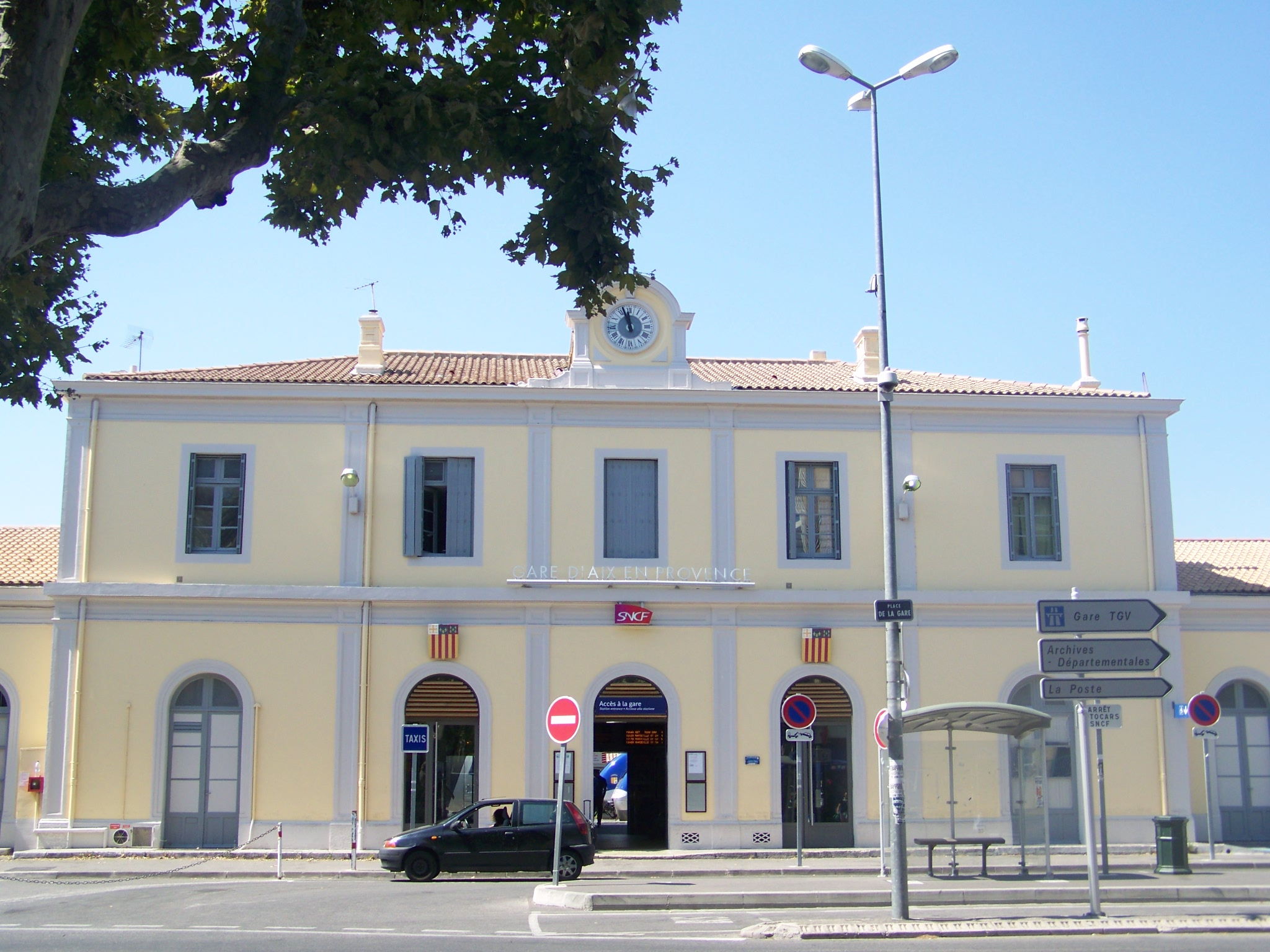
Gare d'Aix-en-Provence

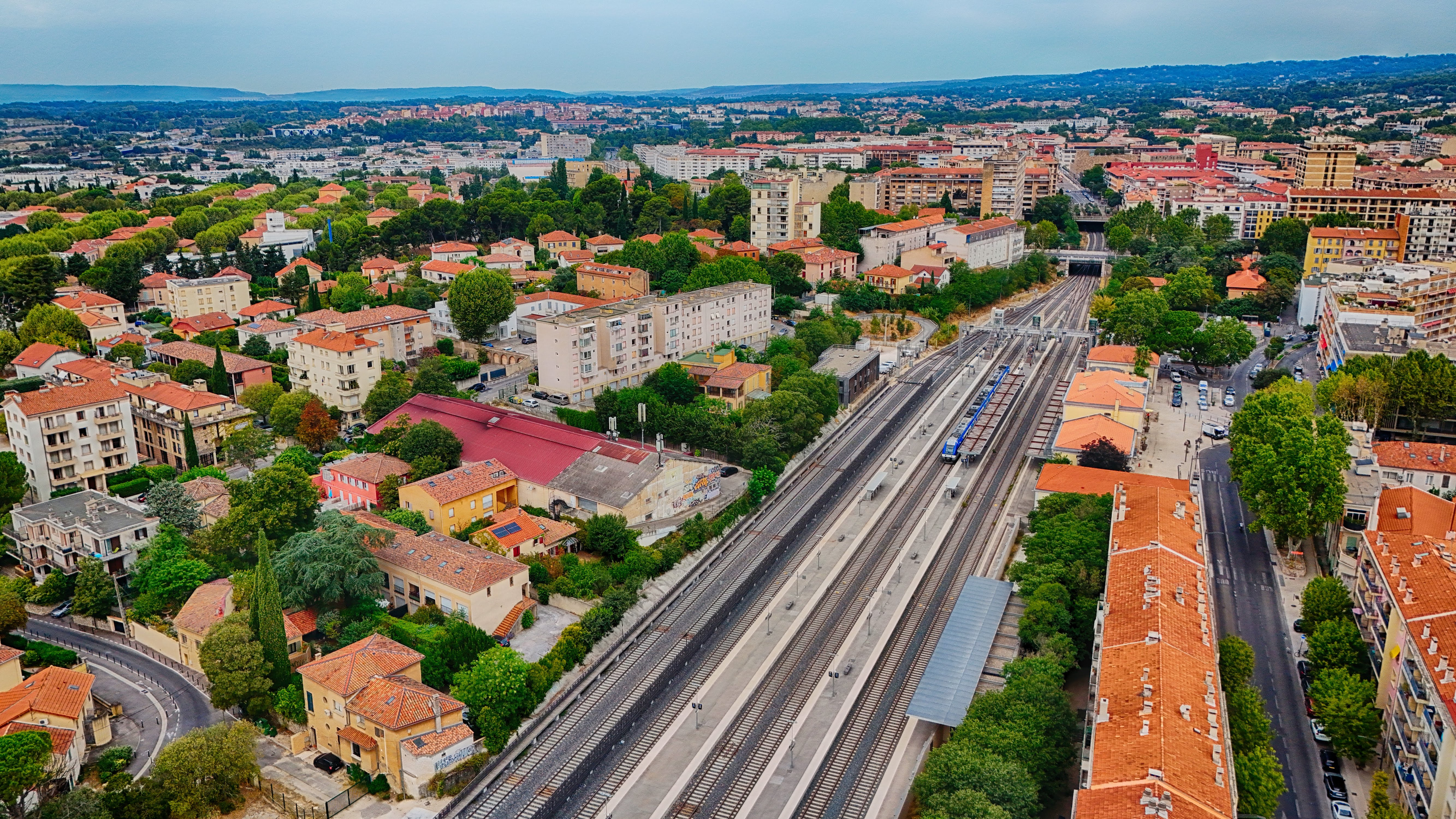
Aix-en-Provence station from the air

Aix-en-Provence railway station is one of two serving the city of Aix-en-Provence in the Bouches-du-Rhône department of southeastern France. The other station, served by long-distance high-speed TGV trains on the LGV Méditerranée line, is Aix-en-Provence TGV, and lies about 12 km southwest of the city centre.

== Services ==
The station is served by regional trains (TER Provence-Alpes-Côte d'Azur) to Marseille, Pertuis, Gap and Briançon.

Preceding station	TER PACA	Following station
Meyrargues towards Pertuis	12	Gardanne towards Marseille
Meyrargues towards Briançon	13	Gardanne towards Marseille
