= Carpentras station =

Railway station in Carpentras, France

Coordinates: 44°2′53″N 5°2′41″E

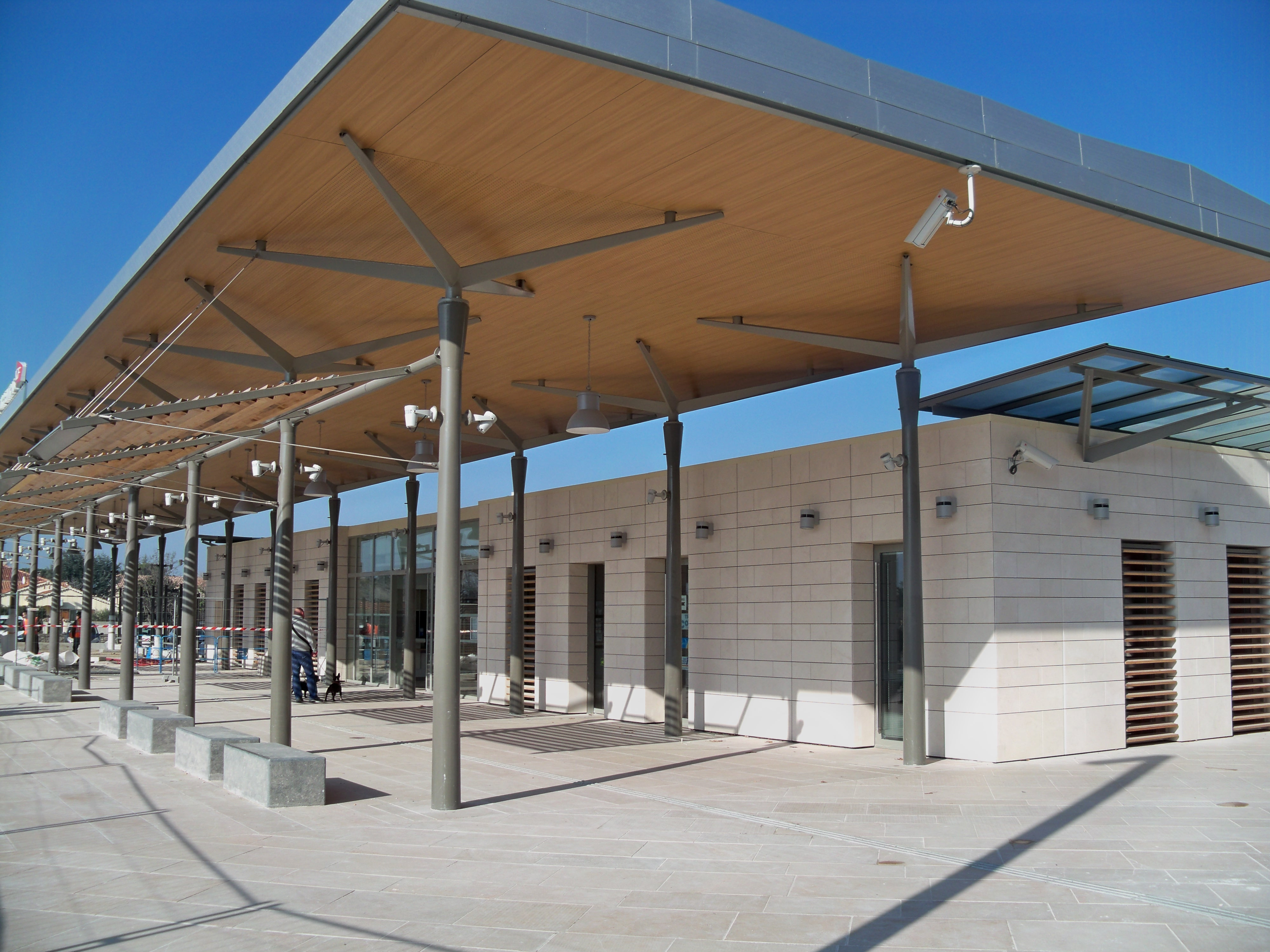
Carpentras station

Carpentras station is a railway station serving the town Carpentras, Vaucluse department, southeastern France. It is the terminus of the railway line from Sorgues to Carpentras, which was closed for passenger traffic in 1938, but reopened after renovation in 2015. Additionally, Carpentras station was on the railway line from Orange to L'Isle-sur-la-Sorgue which also lost its passenger service in 1938 and freight service in stages between 1955 and 1988.

Today, Carpentras station is served by regional passenger trains to Sorgues and Avignon. Freight traffic ended in February 2013 prior to the rehabilitation of the infrastructure for the restart of passenger traffic, although some freight tracks were retained in Carpentras.

Preceding station	TER PACA	Following station
Terminus	9bis	Monteux towards Avignon TGV

== See also ==
- List of SNCF stations in Provence-Alpes-Côte d'Azur
