= Jean-François Blassel =

French architect

Jean-François Blassel (born April 18, 1956), is a French architect of bridges, Viaducts, and railway bridges.

== Places of activity ==
- Renzo Piano Building Workshop
- RFR Engineers

== Works and achievements ==
Non exhaustive list

- Hell jernbanebru, railway bridge, Hell, Norway (2016).

== See also ==
=== Bibliography ===
- "Viaducts on the Rhone at Avignon" in "Forms and Structure", No. 127, p. 41
- "Design and Construction of St. Patrick's Pedestrian Bridge in Calgary" presented during "Footbridge 2014 - Past, Present & Future", London, July 16–18, 2014.
- 'Glas - Haut und Oberfläche' in Detail - Zeitschrift für Architektur + Baudetail , n ° 3, vol. 38, p. 320, 1998
- "The station of Strasbourg" in "Metal Construction", n ° 1, pp. 15–36, 2008

=== Related Articles ===
- Gare d'Avignon TGV
- Gare de Belfort - Montbéliard TGV
- Léon-Blum Viaduct
