= Lyon-Part-Dieu station =

Main railway station of Lyon, France

Coordinates: 45°45′38″N 4°51′34″E

Lyon-Part-Dieu
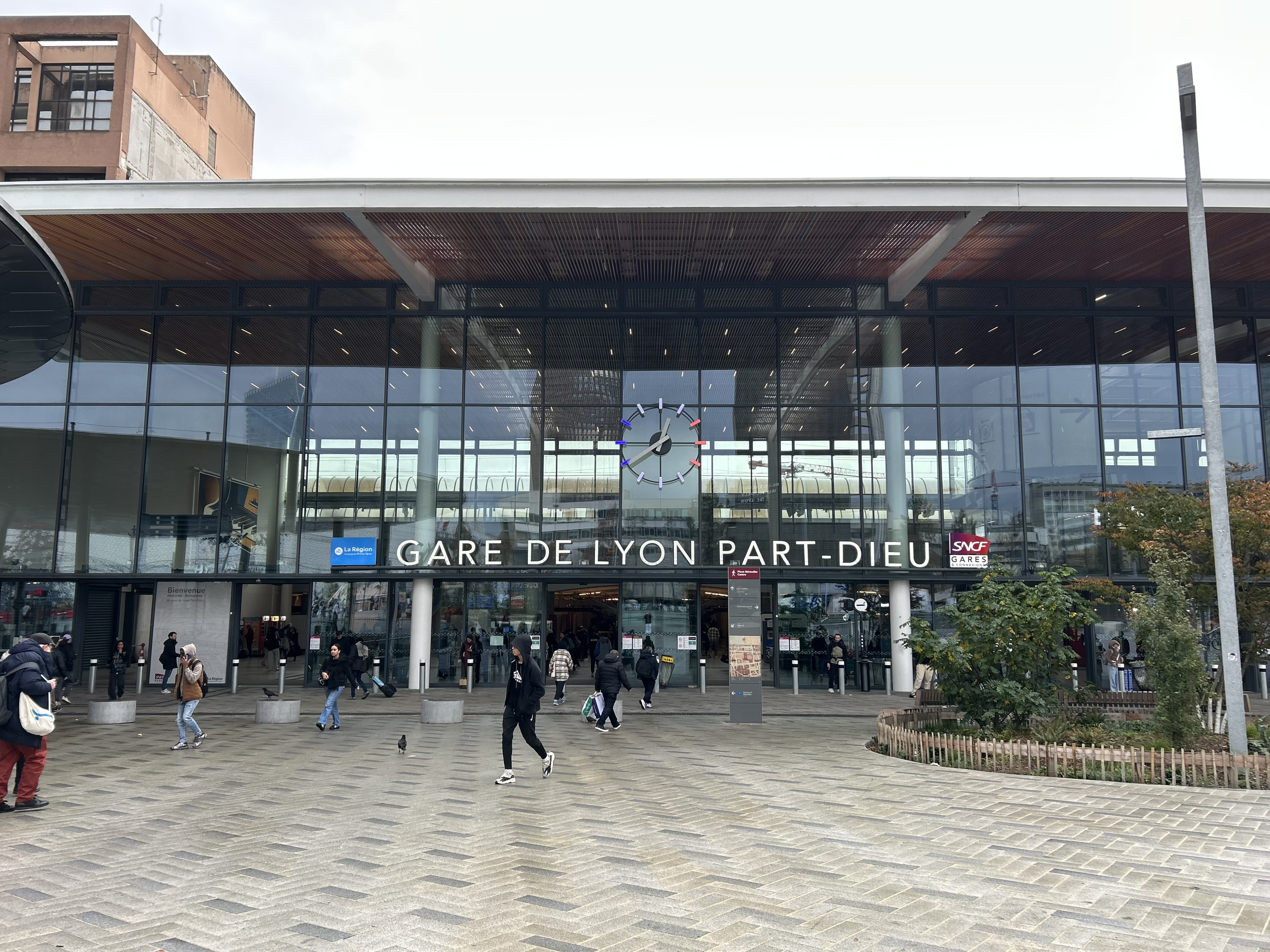
- The main entrance of the station in 2025.

General information
- Location: 3rd arrondissement of Lyon, Auvergne-Rhône-Alpes; France
- Lines: Paris-Marseille railway Lyon–Geneva railway
- Platforms: 12
- Tracks: 12
- Connections: Lyon Metro Lyon Metro Line B Lyon tramway Lyon tramway#Line T1 Lyon tramway#Line T3 Lyon tramway#Line T4

Other information
- Station code: 87723197

History
- Opened: 1983; 43 years ago

Passengers
- 2024: 42,434,779
- Rank: 6th busiest in France (1st out of Paris)
Services
Preceding station	Renfe Operadora	Following station
Terminus	AVE	Valence TGV towards Barcelona Sants
Preceding station	SNCF	Following station
Paris-Lyon Terminus	TGV inOui	Chambéry-Challes-les-Eaux towards Milan
Le Creusot TGV towards Paris-Lyon	TGV inOui	Saint-Étienne-Châteaucreux Terminus
Mâcon-Loché TGV towards Paris-Lyon	TGV inOui	Lyon-Perrache Terminus
Mâcon-Ville towards Luxembourg	TGV inOui	Valence TGV towards Montpellier Sud de France
Massy-Palaiseau towards Le Havre	TGV inOui	Marseille-Saint-Charles towards Marseille
Le Creusot TGV towards Brussels-South	TGV inOui	Lyon-Perrache Terminus
Marne-la-Vallée–Chessy towards Lille-Flandres	TGV inOui	Terminus
Bellegarde towards Lausanne	TGV Lyria Seasonal service	Avignon TGV towards Marseille
Roanne towards Nantes	Intercités	Lyon-Perrache Terminus
Preceding station	DB Fernverkehr	Following station
Avignon TGV towards Marseille	ICE/TGV 84	Mâcon-Ville towards Frankfurt (Main) Hbf
Preceding station	Trenitalia	Following station
Paris-Lyon Terminus	Frecciarossa	Chambéry-Challes-les-Eaux towards Milano Centrale
Paris-Lyon Terminus	Frecciarossa	Lyon-Perrache Terminus
Preceding station	Ouigo	Following station
Marne-la-Vallée–Chessy towards Tourcoing	Grande Vitesse	Valence TGV towards Montpellier Sud de France
Mâcon-Ville towards Paris-Bercy	Train Classique	Lyon-Perrache Terminus
Preceding station	TER Auvergne-Rhône-Alpes	Following station
Terminus	1	La Verpillière towards Grenoble
Terminus	3	Ambérieu towards Saint-Gervais, Geneva or Évian-les-Bains
Terminus	4	Ambérieu towards Annecy
Albigny-Neuville towards Clermont-Ferrand	6	Lyon-Perrache Terminus
Givors-Ville towards Saint-Étienne	10	Terminus
Sathonay-Rillieux towards Bourg-en-Bresse	32	Lyon-Perrache towards Lyon-Vaise
Terminus	35	Crépieux-la-Pape towards Chambéry
Terminus	54	Bourgoin-Jallieu towards Chambéry
Preceding station	TER Bourgogne-Franche-Comté	Following station
Saint-Germain-au-Mont-d'Or towards Dijon	TER	Terminus
Preceding station	TER PACA	Following station
Terminus	10	Vienne towards Marseille
Connections to other stations
Preceding station	Lyon Metro	Following station
Brotteaux towards Charpennes–Charles Hernu	Line B transfer at Gare Part-Dieu–Vivier Merle	Place Guichard–Bourse du Travail towards Saint-Genis-Laval–Hôpital Lyon Sud
Preceding station	Lyon tramway	Following station
Part-Dieu–Auditorium towards Debourg	Line T1 transfer at Gare Part-Dieu–Vivier Merle	Thiers–Lafayette towards La Doua–IUT Feyssine
Terminus	Line T3 transfer at Gare Part-Dieu–Villette	Dauphiné–Lacassagne towards Meyzieu–Les Panettes
Archives–Parc Mandela towards Hôpital Feyzin Vénissieux	Line T4 transfer at Gare Part-Dieu–Villette	Thiers–Lafayette towards La Doua–Gaston Berger
Terminus	Rhônexpress transfer at Gare Part-Dieu–Villette	Vaulx-en-Velin–La Soie towards Lyon Saint-Exupéry Airport
Location
- Location within France Location within Europe

The Gare de la Part-Dieu (French pronunciation: [ɡaʁ d(ə) la paʁdjø]; lit. "God's share railway station") or Lyon-Part-Dieu is the primary railway station of Lyon, France, located in its La Part-Dieu business district. It is on the historical Paris–Marseille railway. Train services are mainly operated by the SNCF with frequent TGV high-speed and TER regional services as well as Intercités, Frecciarossa, AVE and Lyria services. Lyon's second railway station, Perrache station, is located in the south of the historical centre.

== History ==
Originally opened in 1859 as a freight station, the station was constructed in 1978 as part of the new Part-Dieu urban neighborhood project. As the planners intended Part-Dieu to act as a second city center for Lyon, the large train station was built in conjunction with a shopping center (the largest in France), a major government office complex, and the tallest skyscraper in the region, nicknamed Le Crayon (The Pencil) due to its shape. Before the construction of the Gare de la Part-Dieu, the neighborhood was served by the Gare des Brotteaux. It closed in 1982 and its operations were absorbed into this station.

In spring 2018, major reconstruction and refurbishment works began to rebuild the entire station and its near surroundings. The original main entrance building located on the western side was torn down starting that year. 2022 saw the entry into service of a new Platform L and an additional transverse hall (Galerie Pompidou / Hall 2) to access the platforms. Then followed the openings of a number of spaces on the western side: A new entrance building and hall, Galerie Béraudier, in June 2024; an underground interchange plaza in April 2025; and a renewed surface forecourt in September 2025.

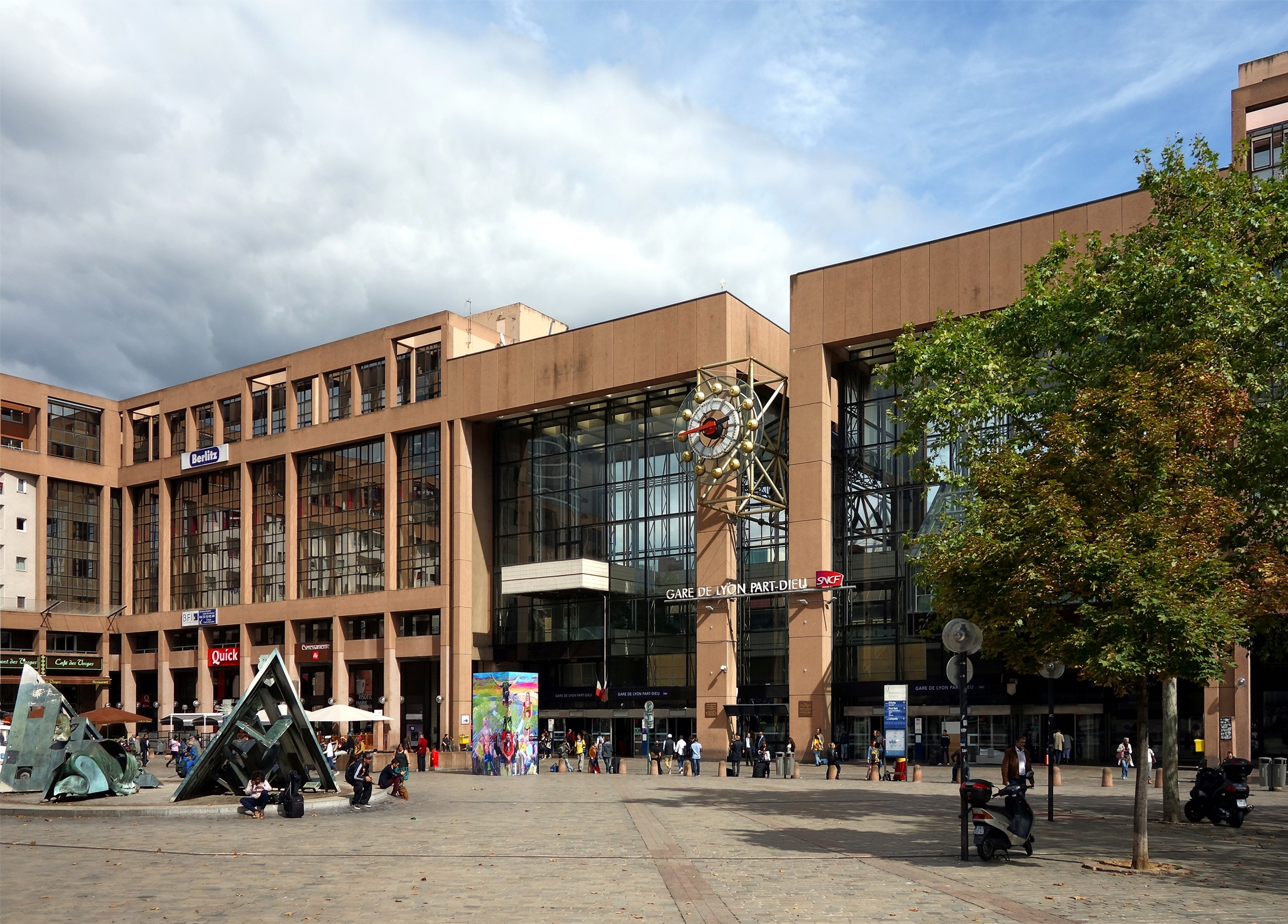
The original (1983–2018) main entrance, in 2013

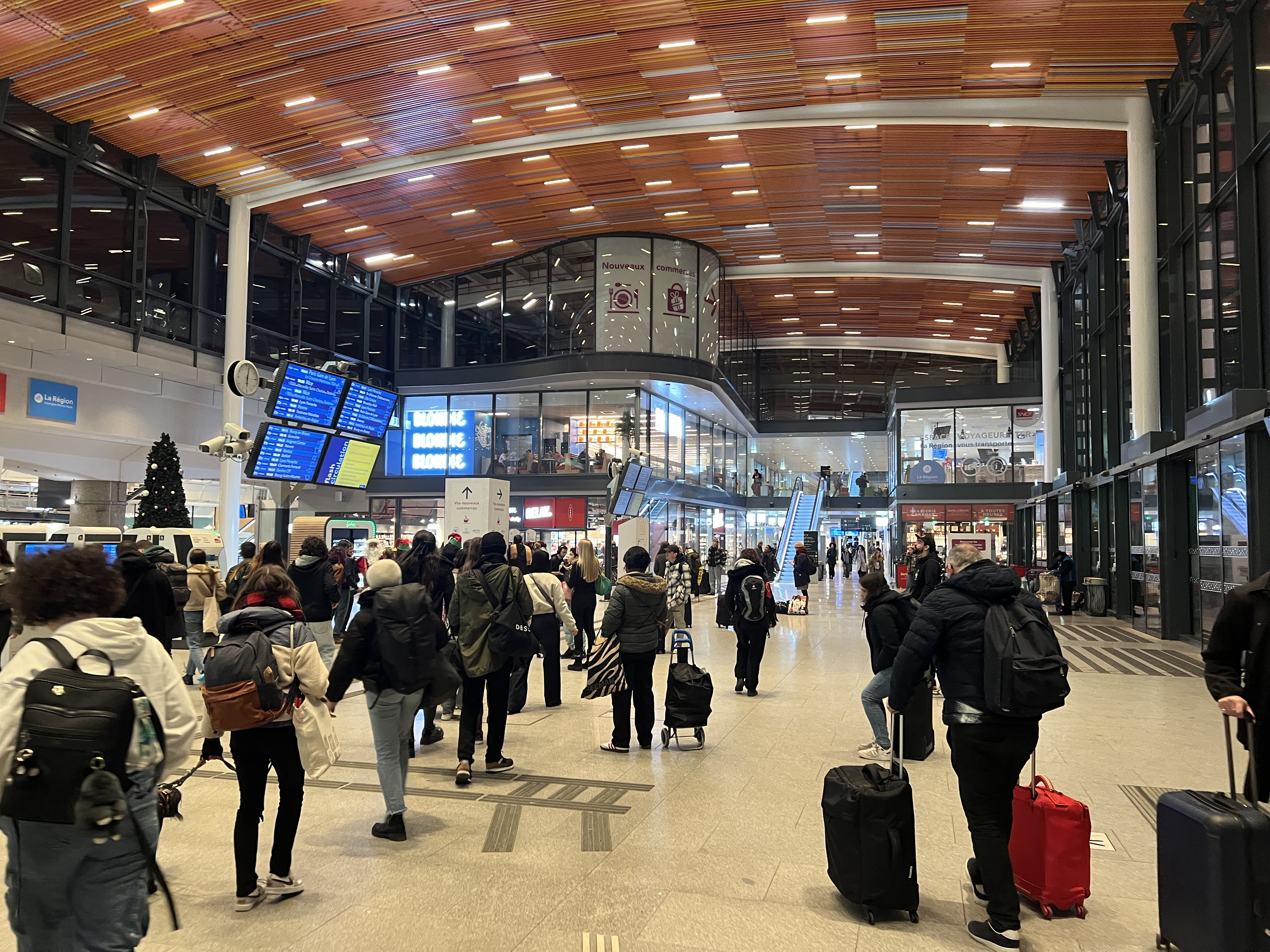
New western entrance hall, in December 2024

== Traffic ==
Lyon-Part-Dieu is the busiest French train station outside of Île-de-France and according to the SNCF, the leading European station in terms of the number of connecting passengers. The station has significantly surpassed its initial traffic expectations, from a moderate 35,000 passengers a day in 1983 to 80,000 passengers on 500 trains a day in 2001. Because of the increased traffic, the station was renovated from 1995–2001 to increase the number of platforms and alter the exterior. In 2010, the station served roughly 51.1 million passengers, approaching 140,000 for an average weekday.

== Local transportation ==
Lyon Part-Dieu has direct access to the Lyon Metro (line B) and tramways T1, T3, and T4. Part-Dieu is also connected to Lyon Saint-Exupéry Airport and TGV station via the dedicated Rhônexpress airport rail link.

== Rail connections ==
Part-Dieu is a significant railway hub, connected to the French (SNCF) and international rail networks. From the many lines that run through Lyon, Part-Dieu is directly connected to Paris, Marseille, Valence, Saint-Étienne, Nice, Montpellier, Perpignan, Barcelona, Rouen, Roissy, Lille, Brussels, Geneva, Tours, Mulhouse, Belfort, Metz, Strasbourg, Nantes, Rennes, Grenoble, Avignon, Aix-en-Provence, Le Havre, Le Mans, Karlsruhe, Frankfurt, Milan, Turin, London. Part-Dieu also has connections to Paris Charles de Gaulle Airport (CDG) by TGV and has been assigned the "XYD" airport code. The SNCF offers connection services to CDG called TGV Air, under code sharing agreements with many airlines.

=== Current international services ===
- High speed services (TGV) Brussels—Lille—Marne-la-Vallée—Lyon—Marseille
- High speed services (TGV) Brussels—Lille—Marne-la-Vallée—Lyon—Nîmes—Montpellier-Perpignan
- High speed services (TGV) Frankfurt—Karlsruhe—Strasbourg—Mulhouse—Besançon—Lyon—Marseille
- High speed services (TGV) Luxembourg/Metz-Strasbourg—Mulhouse—Dijon—Lyon—Marseille/Montpellier
- High speed services (Milan–Paris Frecciarossa) Paris—Lyon—Chambéry—Turin—Milan.
- High speed services (AVE) Lyon—Nîmes—Montpellier—Perpignan—Barcelona
- Local service (TER Auvergne-Rhône-Alpes) Lyon-Part-Dieu—Ambérieu—Culoz—Bellegarde—Genève(Cornavin)

=== Current national services ===
The station is served by France's high-speed rail service, TGV, and Intercités:

- High speed services (TGV) Paris—Lyon/Saint-Étienne
- High speed services (FRECCIAROSSA) Paris—Lyon
- High speed services (TGV) Lyon—Marseille-Nice
- High speed services (TGV) Lille—Marne-la-Vallée—Lyon—Nîmes—Montpellier
- High speed services (TGV) Lille—Arras—Marne-la-Vallée—Lyon—Nîmes—Montpellier
- High speed services (TGV) Lille—Arras—Marne-la-Vallée—Lyon—Marseille
- High speed services (TGV) Nancy—Strasbourg—Besançon—Dijon—Lyon—Marseille—Nice
- High speed services (TGV) Toulouse—Montpellier—Lyon
- High speed services (TGV) Rennes/Nantes—Massy TGV—Lyon/Marseille/Montpellier
- High speed services (TGV) Le Havre—Rouen—Massy TGV—Lyon—Marseille
- Intercity services (Intercités) Nancy—Neufchâteau—Dijon—Mâcon-Ville—Lyon
- Intercity services (Intercités) Nantes—Tours—Bourges—Nevers—Moulins—Lyon

=== Current local services ===
Regional services offered by TER Auvergne-Rhône-Alpes:

- Local service (TER Auvergne-Rhône-Alpes) Lyon—Mâcon—Chalon-sur-Saône—Dijon—Laroche-Migennes—Sens—Paris
- Local service (TER Auvergne-Rhône-Alpes) Lyon—Ambérieu—Bellegarde—Genève/St Gervais-les-Bains/Evian-les-Bains
- Local service (TER Auvergne-Rhône-Alpes) Lyon—Ambérieu—Bourg-en-Bresse—Lons-le-Saunier—Besançon—Belfort
- Local service (TER Auvergne-Rhône-Alpes) Lyon—Chambéry—Bourg-Saint-Maurice/Modane
- Local service (TER Auvergne-Rhône-Alpes) Lyon—Vienne—Valence—Montélimar—Orange—Avignon—Miramas—Marseille
- Local service (TER Auvergne-Rhône-Alpes) Lyon—Tarare—Roanne—Vichy—Clermont-Ferrand
- Local service (TER Auvergne-Rhône-Alpes) Lyon—Givors—Saint-Étienne—Firminy
- Local service (TER Auvergne-Rhône-Alpes) Lyon—Lozanne—Paray-le-Monial—Saincaize—Bourges—Tours
- Local service (TER Auvergne-Rhône-Alpes) Lyon—Villars-les-Dombes—Bourg-en-Bresse

Line	Route
3	Lyon-Part-Dieu ... Ambérieu ... Bellegarde ... Annemasse ... La Roche-sur-Foron ... Saint-Gervais-les-Bains-Le Fayet branch line Bellegarde – Genève-Cornavin branch line Annemasse ... Évian-les-Bains
4	Lyon-Part-Dieu – Ambérieu – Aix-les-Bains-Le Revard – Rumilly – Annecy
35	Lyon-Part-Dieu ... Ambérieu ... Culoz ... Chambéry-Challes-les-Eaux
54	Lyon-Part-Dieu ... Bourgoin-Jallieu ... Chambéry-Challes-les-Eaux
† Not all trains call at this station

=== Projected services ===
- Intercity service Bordeaux-Lyon with new cooperative operator Railcoop, planned for mid-2022 but postponed several times then cancelled as the operator went into liquidation in 2024.

== See also ==
- Transport in Rhône-Alpes
- TER Auvergne-Rhône-Alpes
