= Aix-en-Provence TGV station =

High-speed rail station in Southern France

Aix-en-Provence TGV
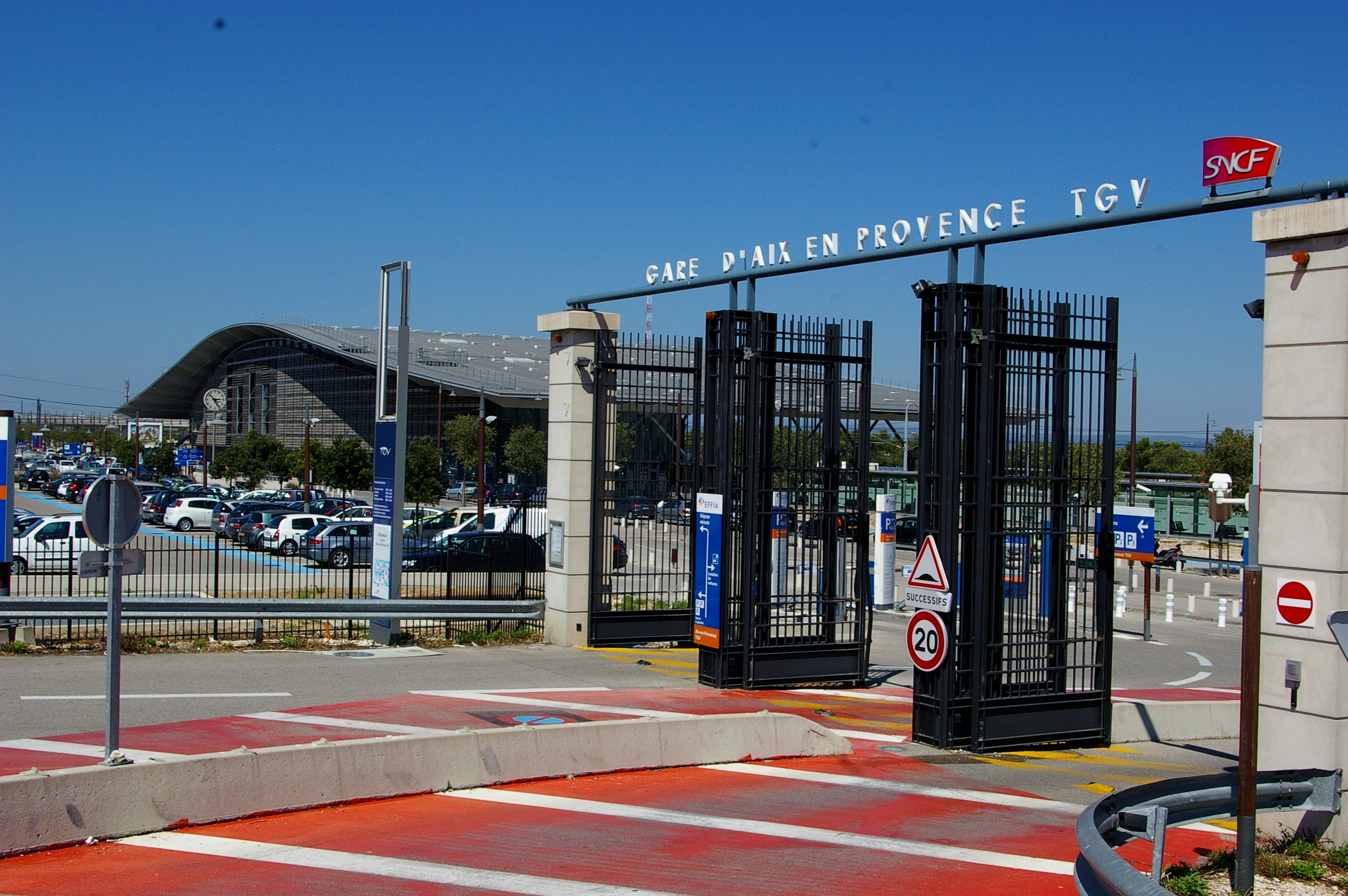
- Aix-en-Provence TGV railway station

General information
- Location: Aix-en-Provence and Cabriès; Bouches-du-Rhône, Provence-Alpes-Côte d'Azur, France
- Coordinates: 43°27′18″N 5°19′2″E
- Line: LGV Méditerranée
- Platforms: 2
- Tracks: 4

Other information
- Station code: 87319012
- IATA code: QXB

History
- Opened: 10 June 2001

Passengers
- 2024: 3,895,541

Services
Preceding station	SNCF	Following station
Paris-Lyon Terminus	TGV	Toulon towards Nice-Ville
Lyon Saint-Exupéry towards Marne-la-Vallée–Chessy	TGV	Marseille Terminus
Avignon TGV towards Paris-Lyon	TGV	Marseille Terminus
Avignon TGV towards Lille-Europe	TGV	Marseille Terminus
Avignon TGV towards Brussels-South	TGV	Marseille Terminus
Avignon TGV towards Northern France	TGV	Marseille Terminus
Avignon TGV towards Bordeaux	TGV	Marseille Terminus
Avignon TGV towards Lausanne	TGV Lyria Seasonal service	Marseille Terminus
Preceding station	Ouigo	Following station
Avignon TGV towards Lille-Flandres	Grande Vitesse	Marseille Terminus
Avignon TGV towards Paris-Lyon	Grande Vitesse	Marseille Terminus
Lyon-Saint-Exupéry TGV towards Paris-Lyon	Grande Vitesse	Toulon towards Nice
Preceding station	DB Fernverkehr	Following station
Marseille Terminus	ICE/TGV 84	Avignon TGV towards Frankfurt (Main) Hbf
Preceding station	Eurostar	Following station
Marseille-Saint-Charles Terminus	Eurostar (summer)	Avignon TGV towards Amsterdam Centraal or Bruxelles-Midi
Location
- Location within France Location within Europe

Aix-en-Provence TGV or simply Aix TGV (French: Gare d'Aix-en-Provence TGV) is a high-speed railway station on the LGV Méditerranée located on the municipal border between Aix-en-Provence and Cabriès, Bouches-du-Rhône, Southern France. Opened in 2001, the station is served by SNCF services. It serves the city of Aix-en-Provence, 15 km (9.3 mi) northeast of the station, the northernmost parts of Marseille, some 20 km (12.4 mi) to the south, as well as Marseille Provence Airport and the town of Vitrolles to the west-southwest.

== Train services ==
From Aix-en-Provence TGV train services depart to major French cities such as: Paris, Lyon, Cannes, Nice, Dijon, Strasbourg, Montpellier, Nantes, Rennes and Lille.

International services operate to Belgium: Brussels, Antwerp (in summer); Germany: Frankfurt; Switzerland: Geneva, Lausanne; The Netherlands: Amsterdam, Rotterdam (in summer); and Spain: Barcelona.

- High speed services (TGV) Paris - Lyon - Avignon - Aix-en-Provence - Marseille
- High speed services (TGV) Paris - Aix-en-Provence - Cannes - Nice
- High speed services (TGV Ouigo) Marne-la-Vallée - Lyon Saint-Exupéry - Aix-en-Provence - Marseille
- High speed services (TGV) Lille - Aeroport CDG - Lyon - Aix-en-Provence - Marseille
- High speed services (TGV) Brussels - Lille - Aeroport CDG - Lyon - Aix-en-Provence - Marseille
- High speed services (TGV/ICE) Frankfurt - Strasbourg - Mulhouse - Belfort - Lyon - Avignon - Aix-en-Provence - Marseille
- High speed services (TGV) Strasbourg - Lyon - Aix-en-Provence - Marseille
- High speed services (TGV) Nantes - Angers - Tours - Lyon - Avignon - Aix-en-Provence - Marseille
- High speed services (TGV) Rennes - Le Mans - Lyon - Avignon - Aix-en-Provence - Marseille
- High speed services (TGV Lyria) Lausanne - Geneva - Lyon - Aix-en-Provence - Marseille
- High speed services (Thalys) Amsterdam - Rotterdam - Antwerp - Brussels - Avignon - Aix-en-Provence - Marseille (Summer Saturdays)

Trains in the direction of Marseille depart from platform 3; those for all other destinations from platform 4.

A summer Saturday only service from London, UK also terminated briefly at the station in 2013.

== Bus services ==
The bus service L40 operates on the following routes:

- Aix-en-Provence TGV - Aix-en-Provence at a 15 minute frequency
- Aix-en-Provence TGV - Marseille Airport, half hourly

Other bus services operate to:

- Digne-les-Bains, Saint-Maximin-la-Sainte-Baume and Le Luc.
