= Marseille-Saint-Charles station =

Main railway and bus station of Marseille, France

Coordinates: 43°18′11″N 5°22′52″E

Marseille Saint-Charles
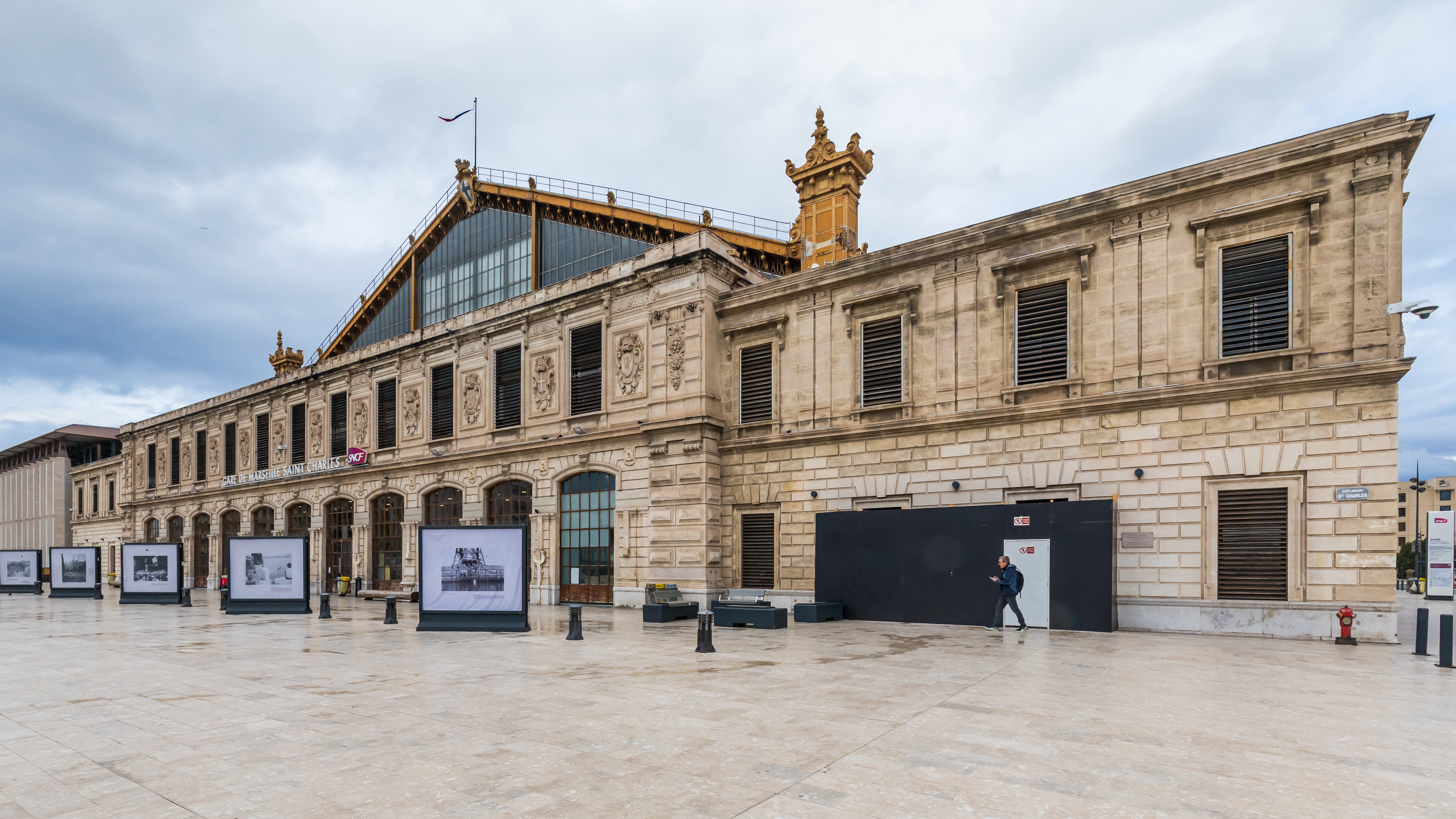
- Main entrance

General information
- Location: Square Narvik; 13232 Marseille Cedex 1
- Owner: SNCF
- Lines: Paris–Marseille railway Marseille–Ventimiglia railway
- Tracks: 16
- Connections: Bus terminal

Construction
- Structure type: At-grade

Other information
- Station code: 87751008
- IATA code: XRF

Passengers
- 2024: 17,863,802
Services
Preceding station	SNCF	Following station
Aix-en-Provence TGV towards Paris-Lyon	TGV inOui	Terminus
Avignon TGV towards Brussels-South	TGV inOui	Terminus
Aix-en-Provence TGV towards Frankfurt	TGV inOui	Terminus
Avignon TGV towards Le Havre	TGV inOui	Terminus
Avignon TGV towards Rennes	TGV inOui	Terminus
Aix-en-Provence TGV towards Luxembourg	TGV inOui	Terminus
Aix-en-Provence TGV towards Nantes	TGV inOui	Terminus
Paris-Lyon Terminus	TGV inOui Seasonal service	Terminus
Avignon TGV towards Nancy-Ville	TGV inOui	Toulon towards Nice-Ville
Avignon TGV towards Lyon-Part-Dieu	TGV inOui	Toulon towards Nice-Ville
Aix-en-Provence TGV towards Lausanne	TGV Lyria Seasonal service	Terminus
Arles towards Bordeaux	Intercités	Terminus
Preceding station	DB Fernverkehr	Following station
Terminus	ICE/TGV 84	Aix-en-Provence TGV towards Frankfurt (Main) Hbf
Preceding station	Renfe Operadora	Following station
Aix-en-Provence TGV towards Madrid Atocha	AVE	Terminus
Preceding station	Ouigo	Following station
Aix-en-Provence TGV towards Lille-Flandres	Grande Vitesse	Terminus
Aix-en-Provence TGV towards Paris-Lyon	Grande Vitesse	Terminus
Preceding station	TER PACA	Following station
Terminus	1	Marseille-Blancarde towards Hyères
Terminus	6	Toulon towards Nice
Arenc-Euroméditerranée towards Miramas	7bis	Terminus
L'Estaque towards Avignon	8	Terminus
Vitrolles-Aéroport towards Avignon TGV	9	Terminus
Vitrolles-Aéroport towards Lyon-Part-Dieu	10	Terminus
Picon-Busserine towards Pertuis	12	Terminus
Saint-Antoine towards Briançon	13	Terminus
Preceding station	TER Occitanie	Following station
Vitrolles-Aéroport towards Narbonne	6	Terminus
Preceding station	Eurostar	Following station
Terminus	Eurostar (summer)	Aix-en-Provence towards Amsterdam Centraal
Location
- Location within France Location within Europe

Marseille-Saint-Charles (French: Gare de Marseille-Saint-Charles; Occitan: Estacion de Marselha-Santa Carles) is the main railway station and intercity bus station of Marseille, France. It is the southern terminus of the Paris–Marseille railway and the western terminus of the Marseille–Ventimiglia railway.

It opened on 8 January 1848, having been built for the Chemins de fer de Paris à Lyon et à la Méditerranée (PLM) on the land of the former Saint Charles Cemetery. The station is perched on top of a small hill and is linked to the city centre by a monumental set of stairs. Since 2001, the TGV has dramatically reduced the travel time between Marseille and Northern France; traffic has increased from 7.1 million annual passengers in 2000 to 17.9 million in 2024. This makes the station the 27th busiest in France.

== History ==
=== Construction of the Saint-Charles Grand Staircase ===
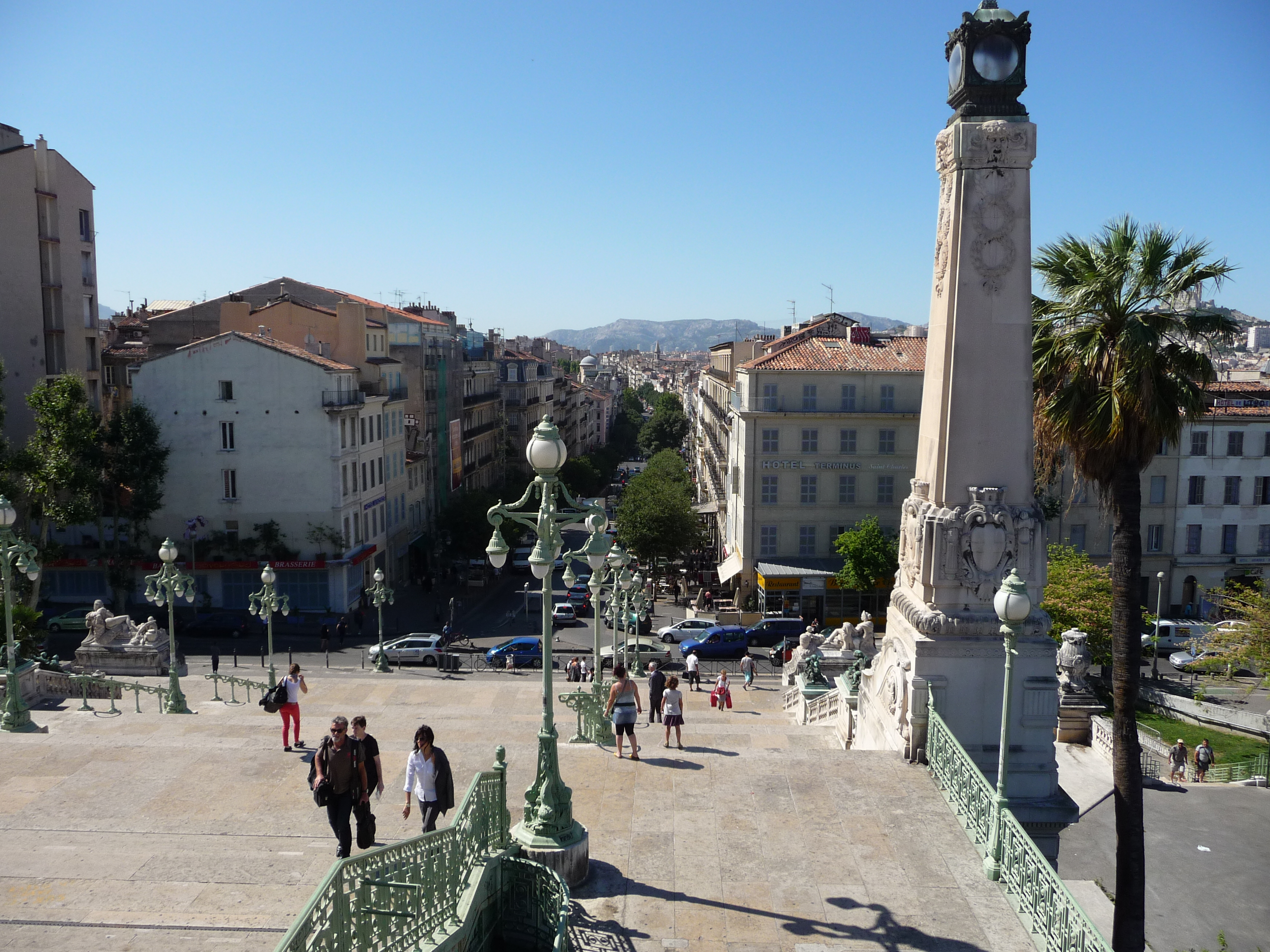
Saint-Charles grand staircase towards the city centre

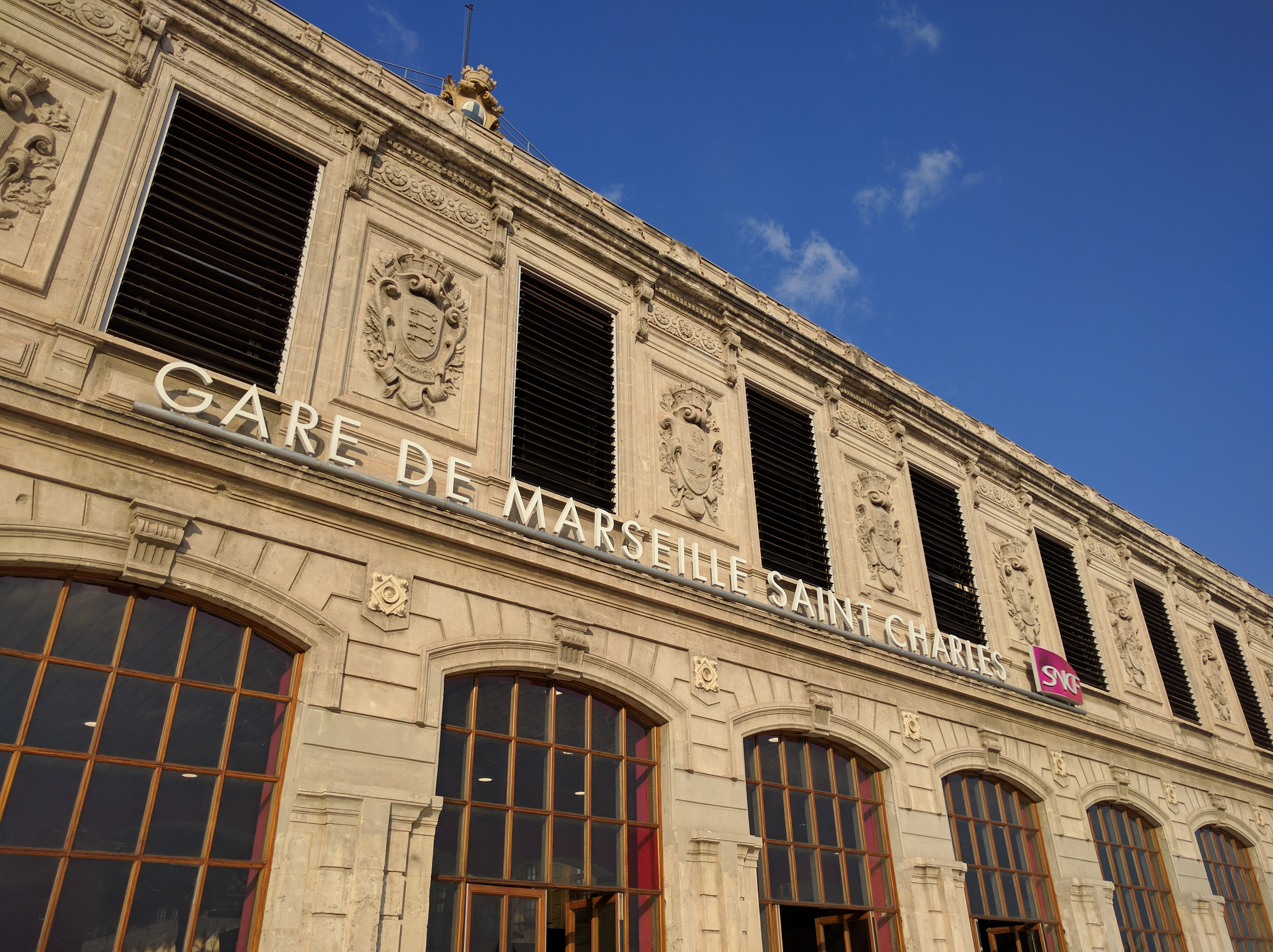
Gare du Marseille St Charles station in France

Marseille-Saint-Charles was once a key stage on the sea voyage to Africa, the Middle East, and the Far East, before the popularisation of flying. The station, originally isolated from the city, was equipped with a grand staircase, envisioned by Eugène Senès. His proposal was approved by the municipality on 3 July 1911, but delayed by World War I. Construction work started on 17 July 1923; the grand staircase was opened on 22 December 1925, before being formally inaugurated by President Gaston Doumergue on 24 April 1927. It is bordered by statues inspired by all the distant locations to which people sailed from Marseille's port.

=== Further expansion after World War II ===
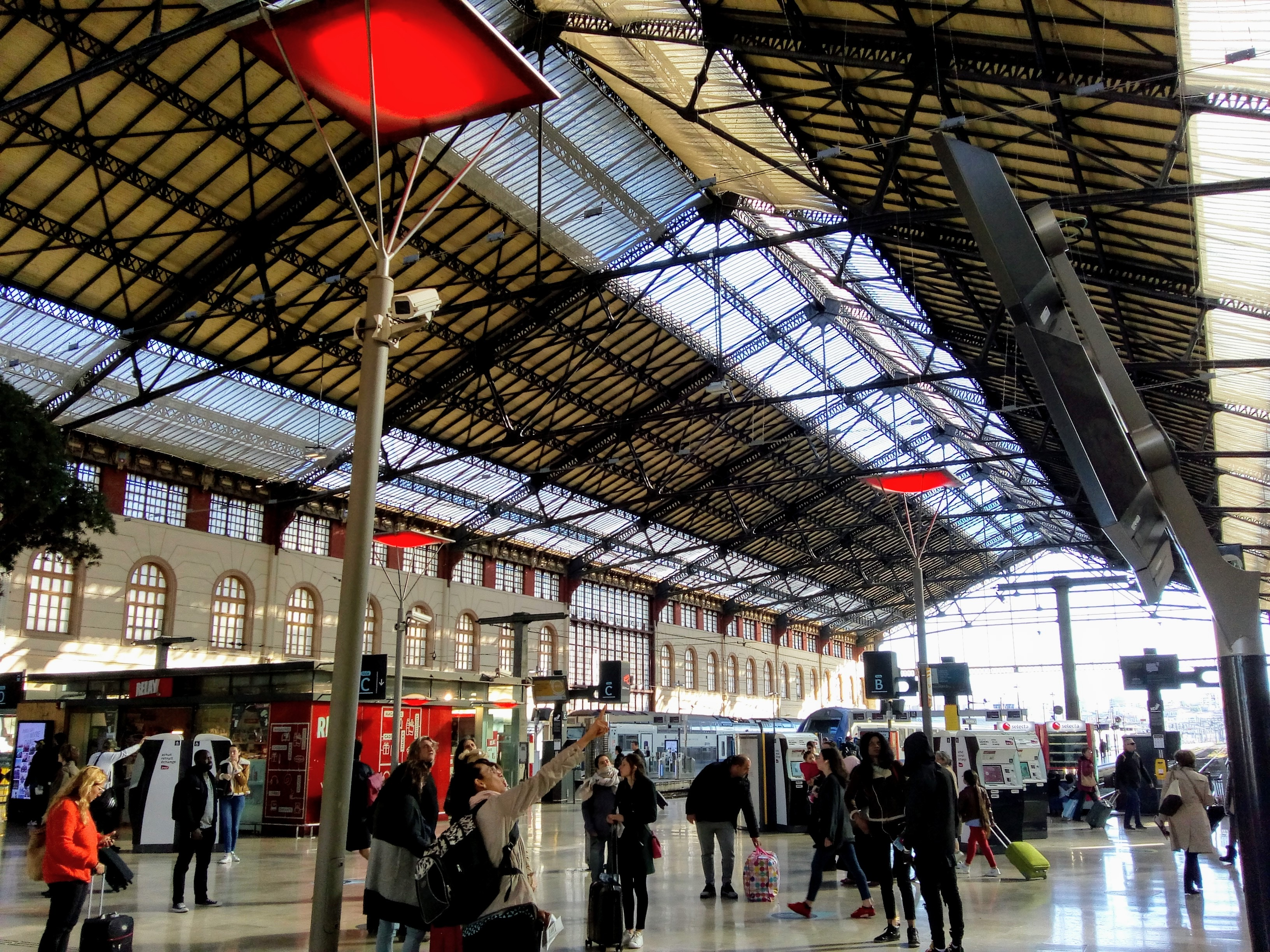
Concourse of Saint-Charles

Saint-Charles currently has 14 terminal platforms and four tracks which run through, all equipped with 1500 V DC overhead wire. Tracks run in various directions, towards Ventimiglia, Italy, the north, Briançon, as well as the harbour station of La Joliette. The first extension was opened after World War II. The buildings on the north side had been destroyed and were rebuilt to house the administration offices of the SNCF. A new between level was opened to enhance the flow of passengers. To the rear of the station along Boulevard Voltaire was the goods yard which was used up until the end of the 1990s by the SNCF's road freight operations, Sernam.

On New Year's Eve 1983, a bomb at the station killed two people; Ilich Ramírez Sánchez, known as Carlos the Jackal, was later convicted for what was classified as a terrorist attack. At the end of the 1990s, a redevelopment project began with the opening of the Marseille Metro and bus interchange as well as the arrival of the LGV Méditerranée.

=== Arrival of the TGV ===
Since 2001, new underground parking lots and a tunnel have allowed the station to be renewed. A new hall, the Halle Honnorat, was created housing shops and services. The displacement of the regional coach station on the other side of the station allowed a new pedestrian square to be created, between the station and the Aix-Marseille University site of Saint-Charles. New pedestrian spaces with cafe terraces have also been created atop the grand stairs. In December 2007, a €230 million modernisation was completed.

On 1 October 2017, two women were killed in a knife attack at the train station before the perpetrator, an illegal immigrant from Tunisia, was shot dead by soldiers on patrol. His act was classified as jihadist terrorism by Europol.

== Train services ==
The station is served by the following services:

- High-speed services (TGV) Paris-Lyon Station - Valence TGV - Avignon TGV - Marseille Saint Charles
- High-speed services (TGV Bruxelles-France) Brussels-Midi - Lille Europe / Lille-Flandres - Charles de Gaulle Airport 2 TGV - Lyon Part-Dieu - Avignon TGV - Marseille Saint Charles
- High-speed services (AVE) Madrid-Atocha - Zaragoza - Barcelona-Sants - Perpignan - Montpellier Saint Roch - Avignon TGV - Aix-en-Provence TGV mp airport - Marseille Saint Charles
- High-speed services (TGV/ICE) Frankfurt (Main) Hauptbahnhof - Mannheim Hauptbahnhof - Karlsruhe Hauptbahnhof - Baden-Baden - Strasbourg-Ville - Mulhouse-Ville - Lyon Part-Dieu - Avignon TGV - Aix-en-Provence TGV mp airport - Marseille Saint Charles
- High-speed services (TGV) Nancy - Strasbourg - Besançon-Franche-Comté-TGV - Dijon-Ville - Lyon Part-Dieu - Avignon TGV - Marseille Saint Charles - Cannes - Nice-Ville
- High-speed services (TGV Lyria) Lausanne - Geneva-Cornavin - Marseille Saint Charles
- High-speed services (TGV) Lyon Part-Dieu - Valence TGV Southern Rhône-Alps - Avignon TGV - Aix en Provence TGV mp airport - Marseille Saint Charles - Toulon - Les Arcs-Draguignan - Cannes - Nice-Ville
- High-speed services (TGV) Le Havre - Rouen-Rive Droite - Versailles-Chantiers - Lyon Part-Dieu - Avignon TGV - Marseille Saint Charles
- High-speed services (TGV) Rennes / Nantes - Le Mans - Lyon Part-Dieu - Avignon TGV - Marseille Saint Charles
- High-speed services (Thalys) Amsterdam Centraal - Rotterdam Centraal - Antwerpen-Central - Bruxelles-Midi/Brussel-Zuid - Avignon TGV - Marseille Saint Charles (Summer Saturdays)
- Intercity services (Intercités) Bordeaux Saint Jean - Toulouse-Matabiau - Narbonne - Béziers - Montpellier Saint Roch - Nîmes - Arles - Marseille Saint Charles
- High-speed services (TGV Ouigo) Marne-la-Vallée / Lyon-Perrache - Lyon Saint-Exupéry - Avignon TGV - Marseille Saint Charles
- Regional intercity services Lyon Part-Dieu - Montelimar - Orange - Avignon-Centre - Arles - Miramas - Marseille Saint Charles
- Regional intercity services Portbou (Spain) - Perpignan - Béziers - Montpellier Saint Roch - Miramas - Vitrolles mp airport - Marseille Saint Charles
- Regional intercity services Briançon - Gap - Sisteron - Aix en Provence Ville - Marseille Saint Charles
- Regional intercity services Marseille Saint Charles - Toulon - Les Arcs-Draguignan St Raphael- Cannes - Antibes - Nice-Ville
- Regional services Avignon-Centre - Arles - Miramas - Vitrolles mp airport - Marseille Euromediterranee - Marseille Saint Charles
- Regional services Avignon TGV - Avignon Centre - Salon - Miramas - Vitrolles mp airport - Marseille Euromediterranee - Marseille Saint Charles
- Local services Miramas - Fos-sur-Mer - Carry-le-Rouet - Séon St Henry - Marseille Saint Charles
- Local services Pertuis - Aix-en-Provence Ville - Gardanne - Saint Antoine - Marseille Saint Charles
- Local services Marseille Saint Antoine - Marseille Saint Charles
- Local services Marseille Saint Charles - Marseille Blancarde - Aubagne - Toulon - (Hyères)
- Local services Marseille Saint Charles - Marseille Blancarde - La Barasse - Aubagne
