= Lyon-Saint-Exupéry TGV station =

High-speed rail station near Lyon, France

Lyon Saint-Exupéry TGV
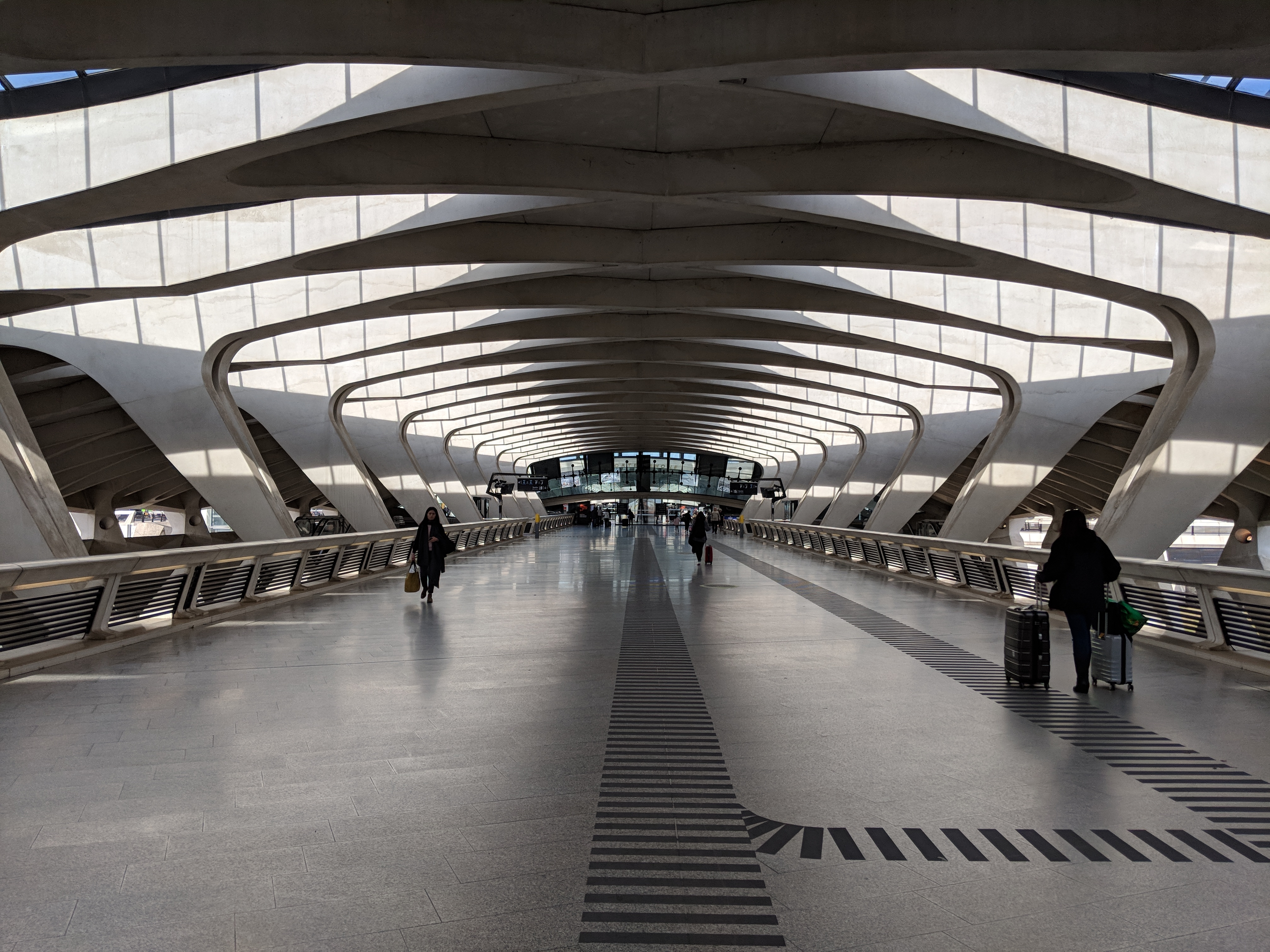
- Access to the platforms in the station

General information
- Location: BP 176; 69125 Colombier-Saugnieu; Rhône; France
- Coordinates: 45°43′16″N 5°4′34″E
- Line: LGV Rhône-Alpes
- Platforms: 3 (TGV) + 2 (Rhônexpress)
- Tracks: 5 (TGV) + 2 (Rhônexpress)
- Connections: Lyon tramway Lyon–Saint-Exupéry Airport

Construction
- Architect: Santiago Calatrava

Other information
- Station code: 87762906

History
- Opened: 3 July 1994

Passengers
- 2024: 2,251,500

Services
Preceding station	Lyon tramway	Following station
Meyzieu–ZI towards Gare Part-Dieu–Villette	Rhônexpress	Terminus
Location

Lyon Saint-Exupéry TGV station (formerly Gare de Satolas TGV) is a railway station near Lyon, France, directly attached to Lyon–Saint-Exupéry Airport. The station was built as an addition to the airport to serve TGV trains on the LGV Rhône-Alpes, part of the main line running from Paris Gare de Lyon to Marseille Saint-Charles. It is situated about 20 km east of Lyon city centre.

A rail link to La Part-Dieu (main railway station and business district) in central Lyon is provided by the Rhônexpress tram-train line with a 30-minute journey.

== Overview ==
Saint-Exupéry station was designed by Santiago Calatrava, cost 750 million Francs and opened on 3 July 1994, at the same time as the high-speed line to Saint-Marcel-lès-Valence. The building is mostly a combination of concrete and steel. The station has six tracks laid in a cutting. The two central tracks are isolated to permit trains to traverse the station at full speed (300 km/h) and have no platforms. The two external sets of tracks have 500 m-long (1,600 ft) platforms. A small piece of land to the west is put aside for future expansion. Above the tracks, a 300 m-long (980 ft) passenger concourse gives easy access to the platforms and is equipped with several travelators.

The railway station is linked to Lyon-Saint Exupéry Airport by a footbridge equipped with a travelator. This airport is historically the first to be served by a high-speed station. This proximity to the airport has not helped the station and it sees little use as passengers mainly use Lyon-Perrache and Lyon Part-Dieu.

=== Criticism ===
Lack of interconnection with Lyon's urban transport network is frequently cited for the station's low usage. The arrival of the Rhônexpress express tram (opened August 2010) is unlikely to change this as Lyon residents will still find it easier (and cheaper) to use the stations within the city. The main "advantage" of the station is for travellers, arriving by plane, who are travelling onwards to the east. The underutilisation of the station has led to lower access charges than for the busier downtown stations, leading to low-cost operator Ouigo making it part of its network.

== Train services ==
The station is served by the following services:

- High speed services (TGV) from Paris to Grenoble
- High speed services (TGV) from Paris to Valence, Montélimar and Avignon
- High speed services (TGV) from Paris to Valence, Montélimar, Avignon and Miramas
- High speed services (TGV Ouigo) from Marne-la-Vallée to Lyon Saint-Exupéry, Avignon and Marseille Saint-Charles
- High speed services (TGV Ouigo) from Marne-la-Vallée to Lyon Saint-Exupéry, Nîmes and Montpellier
- High speed services (TGV Ouigo) from Paris to Grenoble, Albertville and Bourg-Saint-Maurice (seasonal)

== Gallery ==
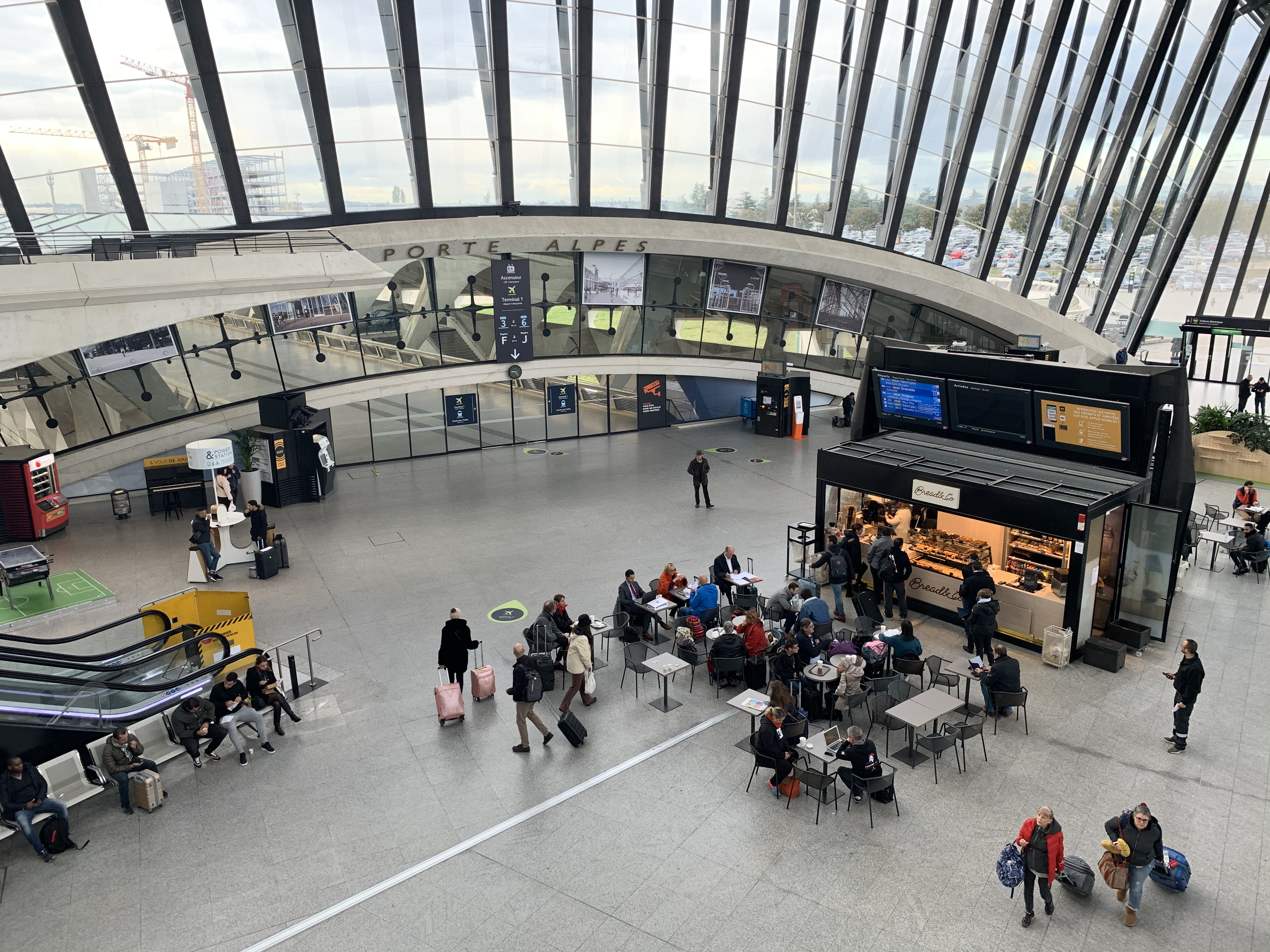
Station hall (2019)

Escalators heading to the airport (2015)

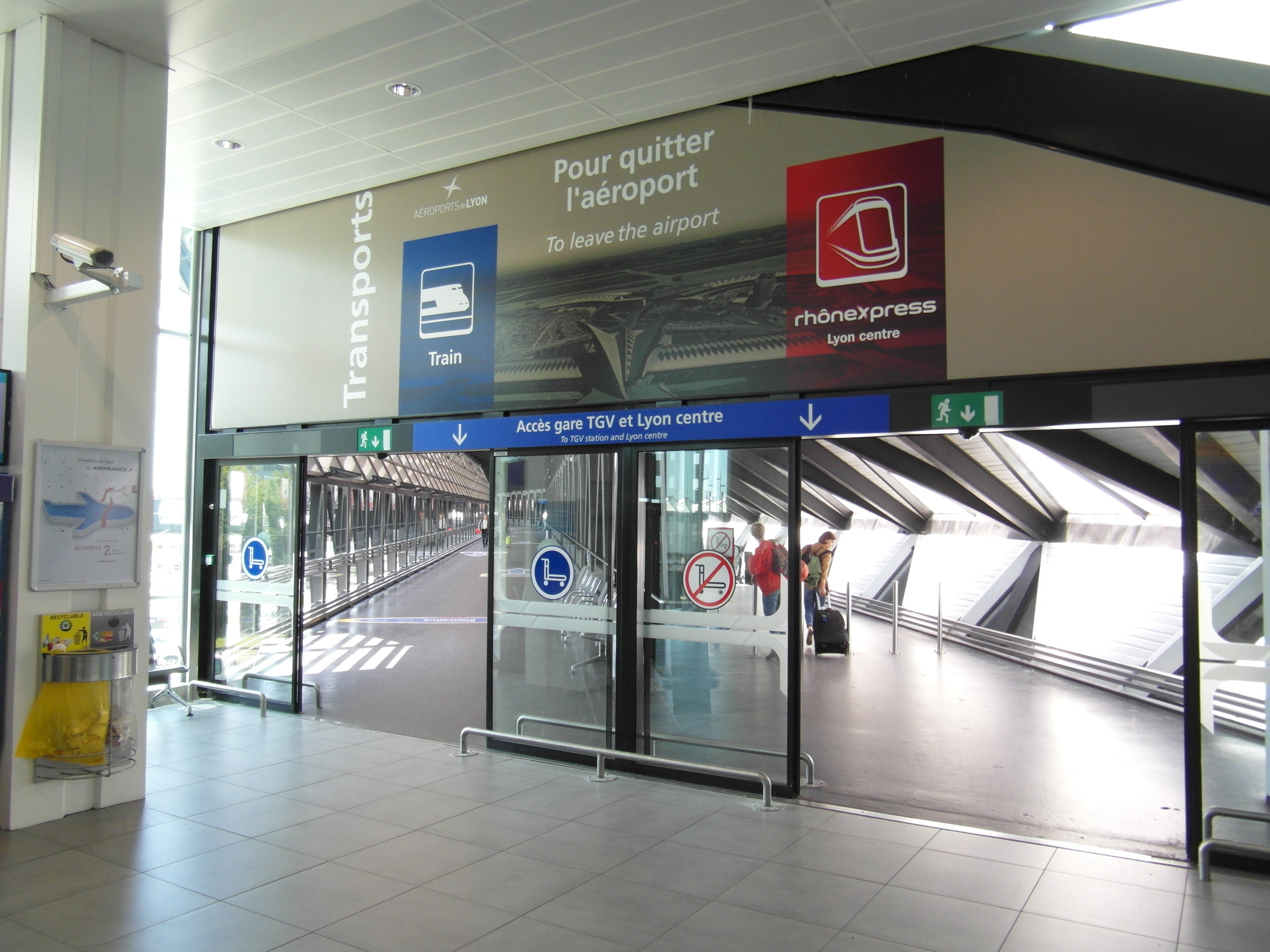
Station entrance from the airport by travelator (2012)

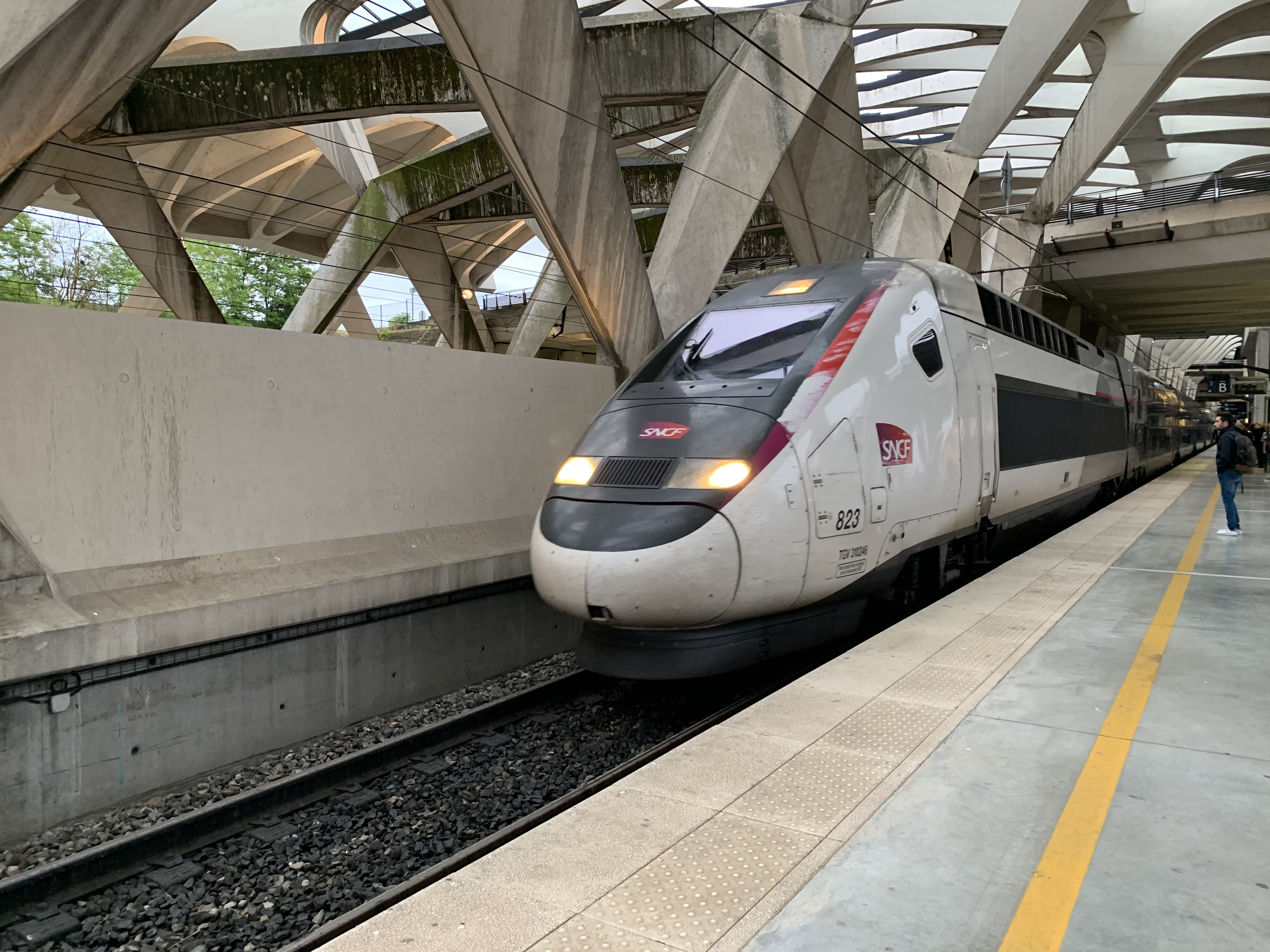
A TGV inOui in the station (2019)

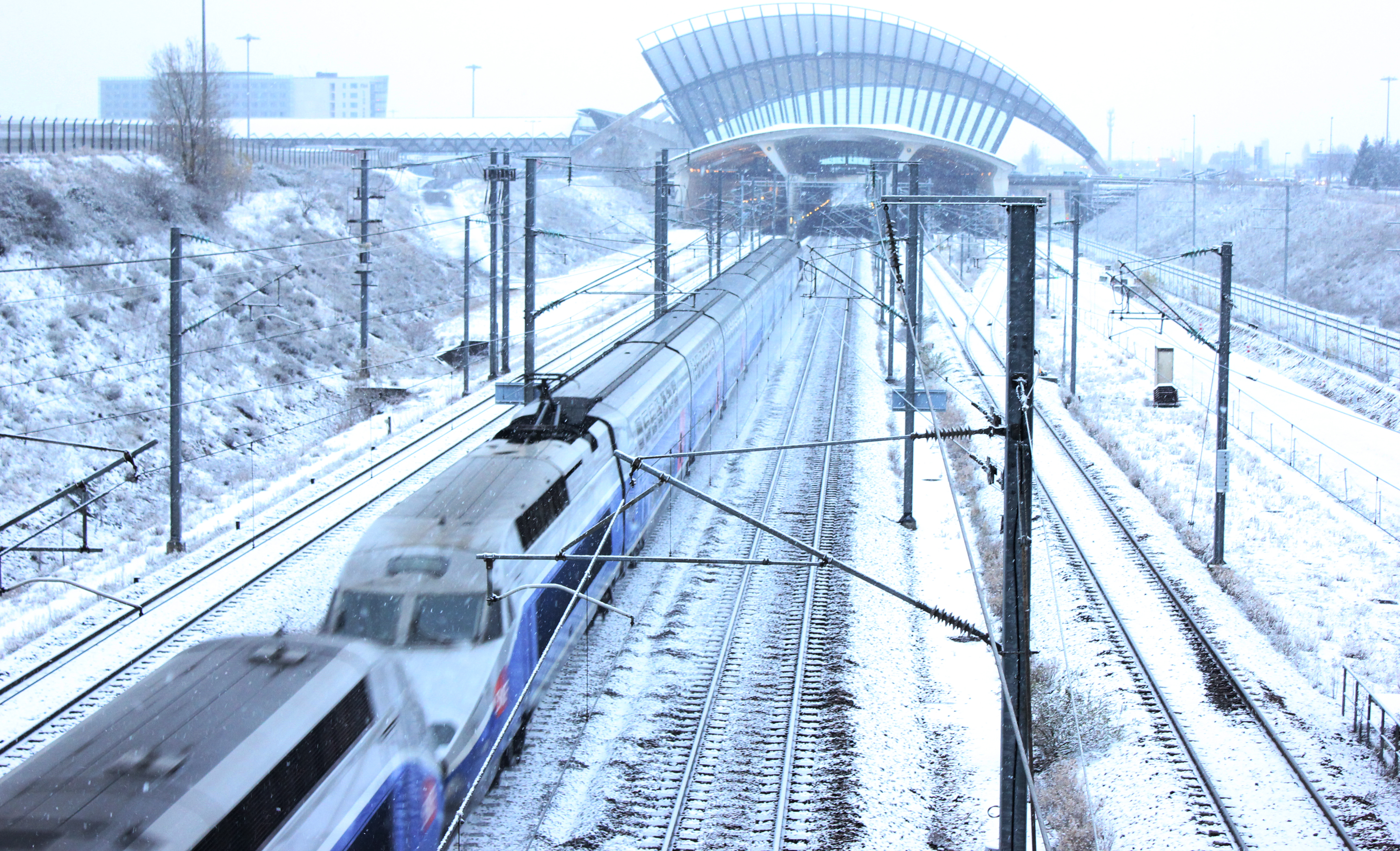
High-speed trains can pass through the station at 300km/h in a dedicated tube

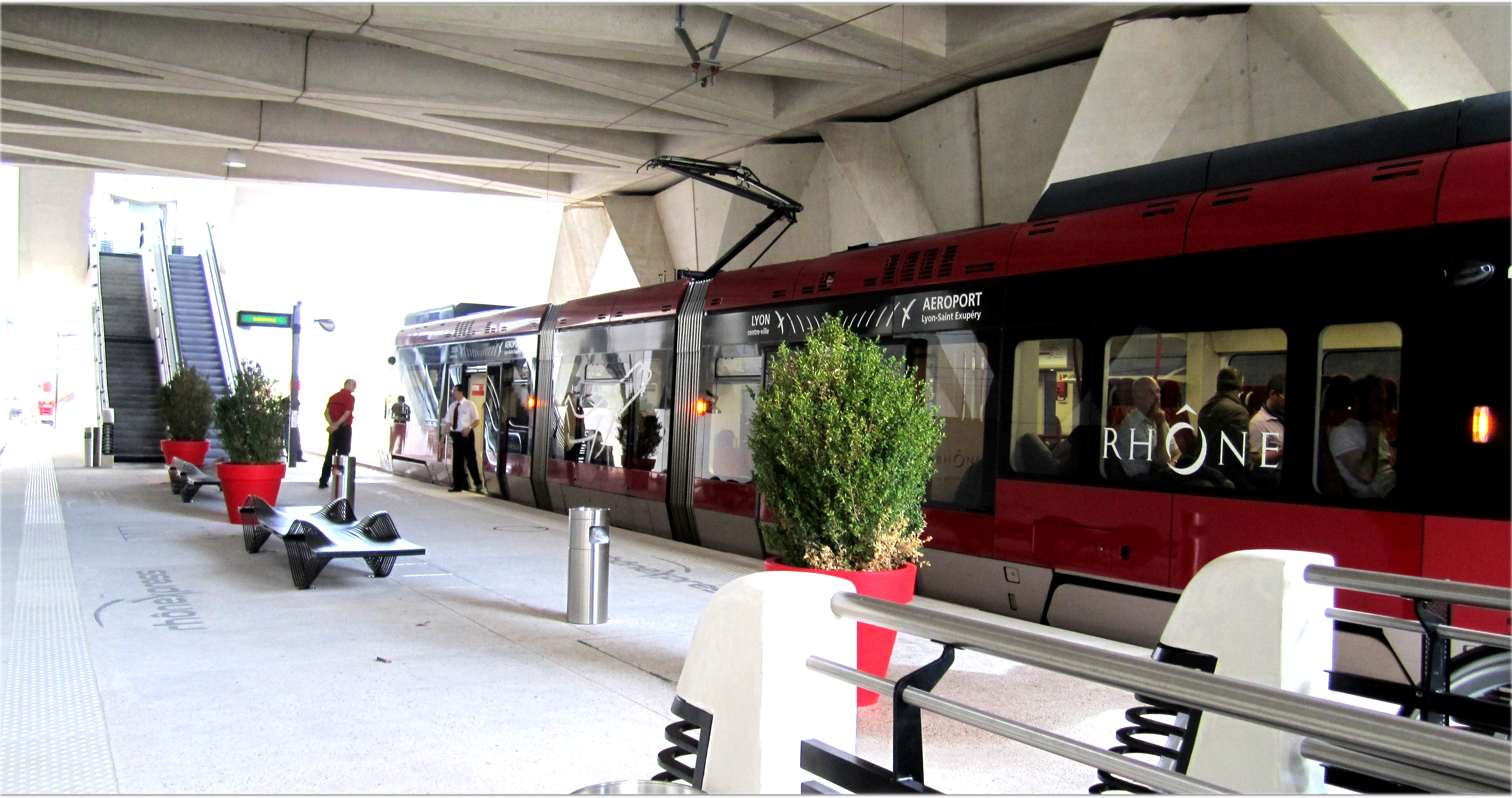
Rhônexpress station (2011)

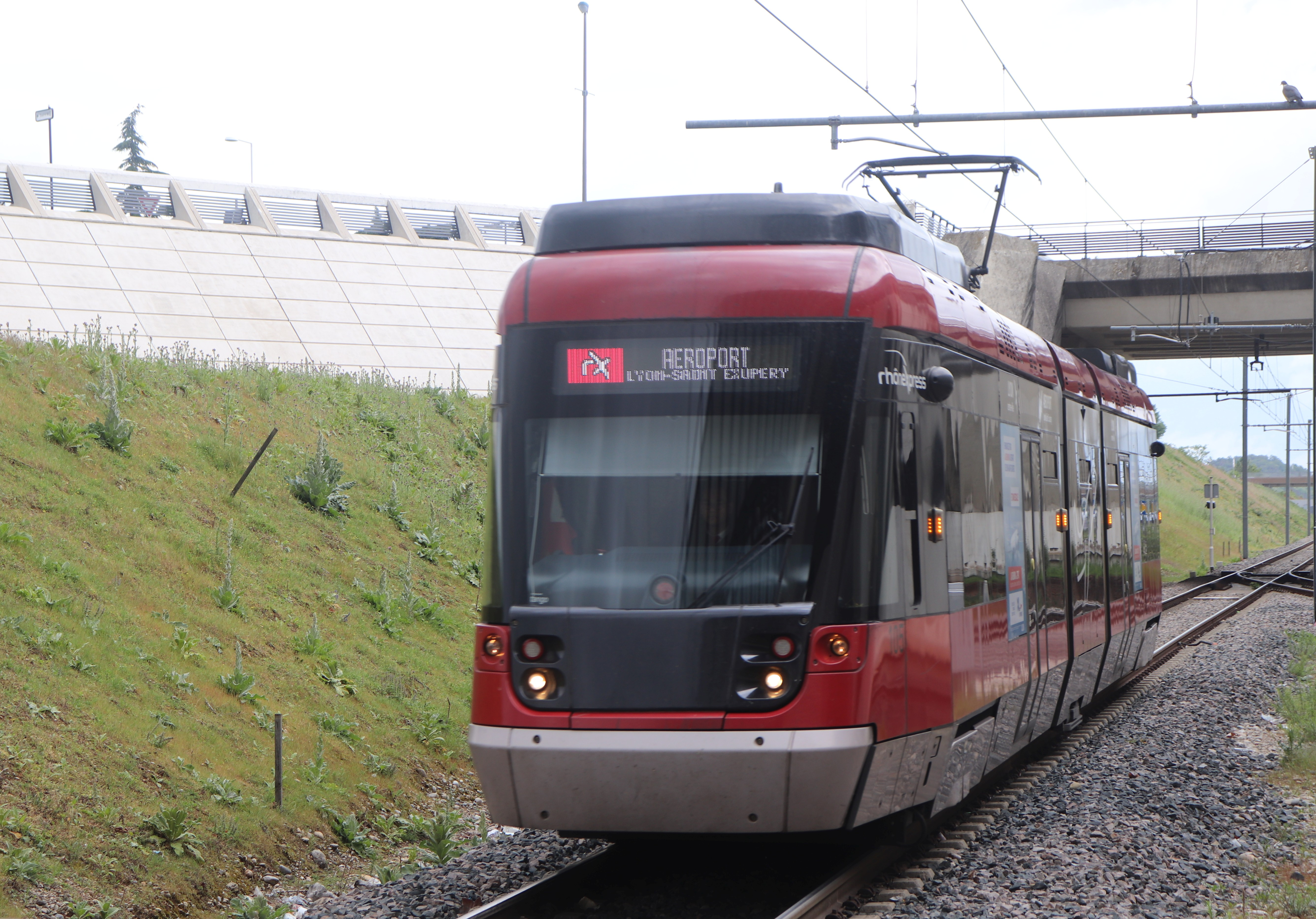
A Rhônexpress tram-train arriving at Saint-Exupéry (2019)
