= Saint-Marcel-lès-Valence =

- Commune
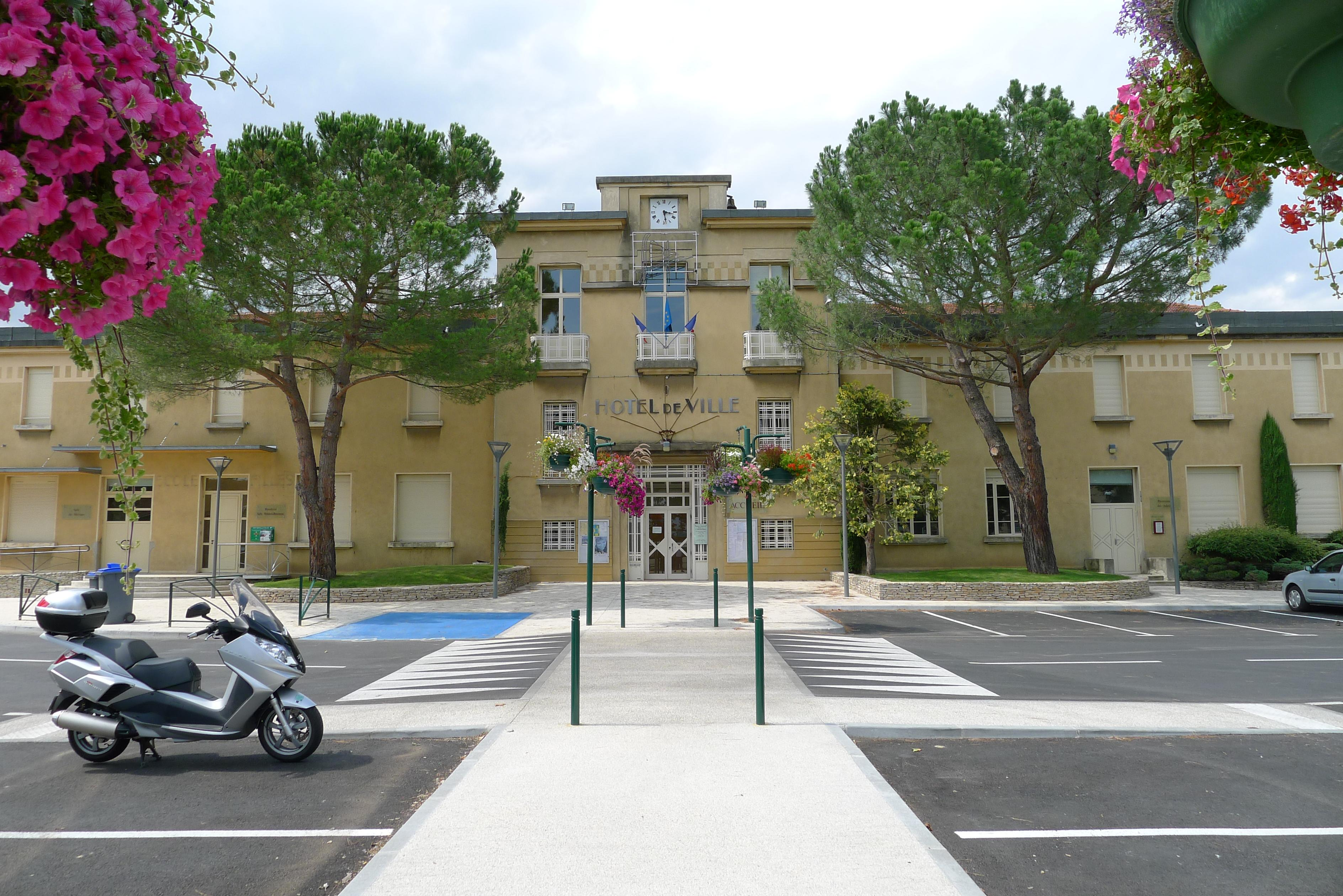
- Town hall

- Coat of arms
- Location of Saint-Marcel-lès-Valence
- Location within France Location within Auvergne-Rhône-Alpes
- Coordinates: 44°58′18″N 4°57′27″E
- Country: France
- Region: Auvergne-Rhône-Alpes
- Department: Drôme
- Arrondissement: Valence
- Canton: Valence-1
- Intercommunality: CA Valence Romans Agglo

Government
  - Mayor (2020–2026): Jean-Michel Valla
- Area^{1}: 15.05 km^{2} (5.81 sq mi)
- Elevation: 286 m (938 ft)
- Highest elevation: 201 m (659 ft)
- Lowest elevation: 178 m (584 ft)
- Population (2023): 6,176
  - Density: 410.4/km^{2} (1,063/sq mi)
- Time zone: UTC+01:00 (CET)
  - Summer (DST): UTC+02:00 (CEST)
- INSEE/Postal code: 26313 /26320
- ^{1} French Land Register data, which excludes lakes, ponds, glaciers > 1 km^{2} (0.386 sq mi or 247 acres) and river estuaries.

Saint-Marcel-lès-Valence (French pronunciation: [sɛ̃ maʁsɛl lɛ valɑ̃s], literally Saint-Marcel near Valence; Occitan: Sant Marçau de Valença) is a commune in the Drôme department in southeastern France.

== Population ==
Historical population

Year	Pop.	±% p.a.
1911	982	—
1962	1,256	+0.48%
1968	1,457	+2.50%
1975	2,652	+8.93%
1982	3,342	+3.36%
1990	3,719	+1.35%

Year	Pop.	±% p.a.
1999	4,114	+1.13%
2007	4,762	+1.85%
2012	5,746	+3.83%
2017	6,236	+1.65%
2023	6,176	−0.16%

Source: EHESS and INSEE (1968–2023)

== Geography ==
The commune of Saint-Marcel-lès-Valence borders the city of Valence, the prefecture of Drôme.

== See also ==
- Communes of the Drôme department
