= Régiolis =

Type of electric/diesel train for passenger transportation

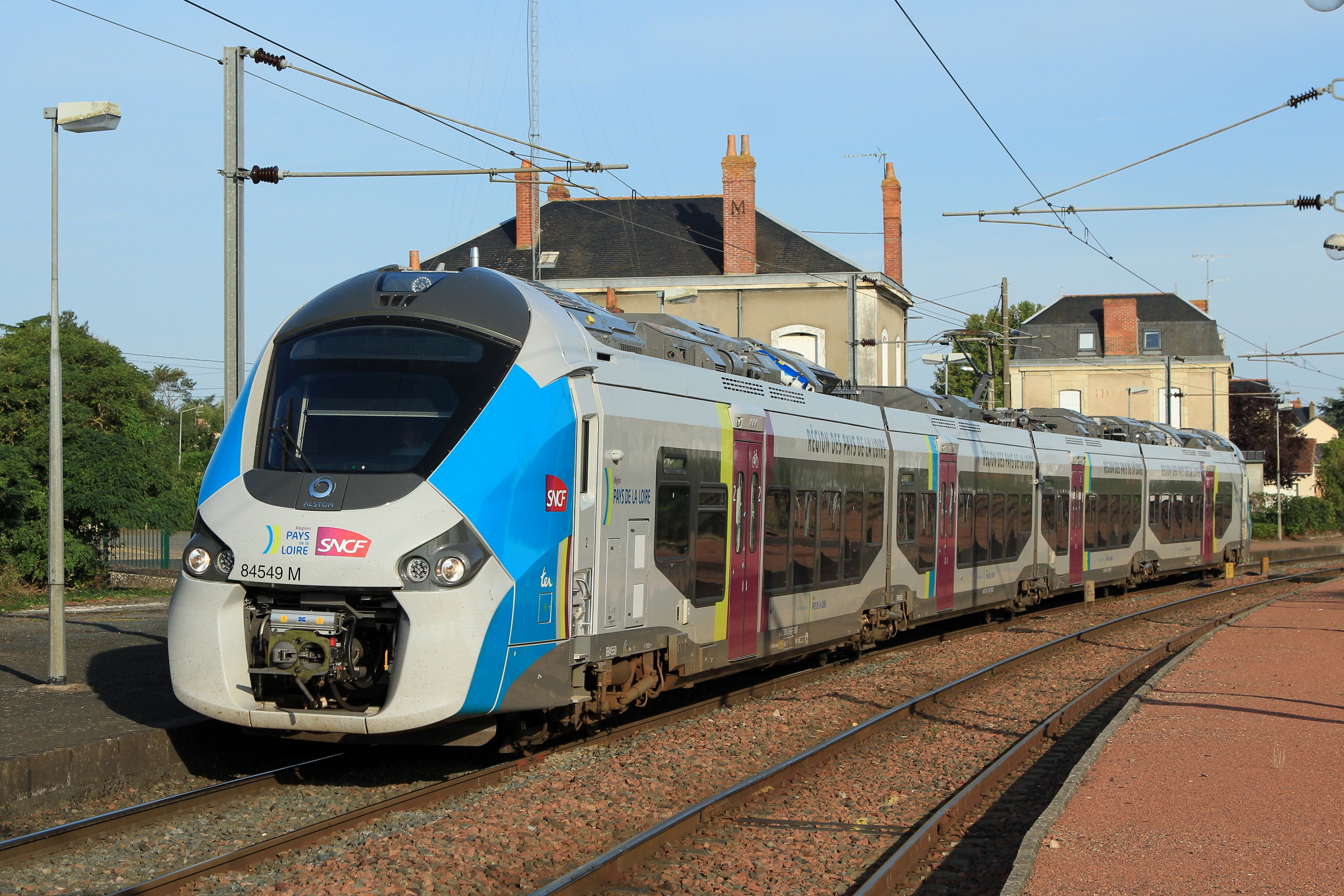
- Régiolis at Montreuil-Bellay station.

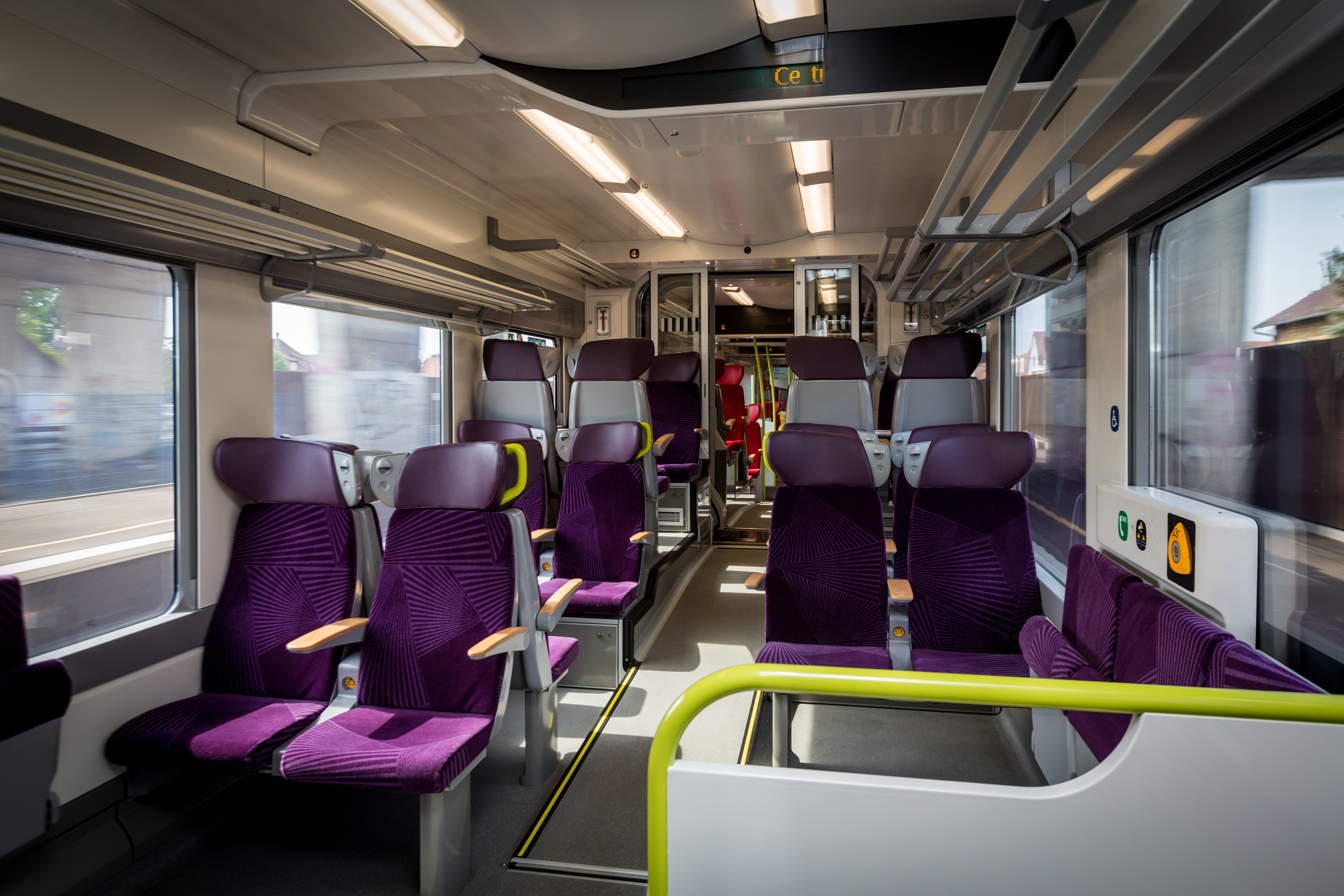
- Interior of a B 83511 Régiolis of TER Alsace
- Manufacturers: Alstom, Construcciones y Auxiliar de Ferrocarriles
- Family name: Coradia
- Entered service: 2013
- Number in service: 242
- Operators: SNCF (TER, Intercités); SNTF; SWEG

Specifications
- Car length: 56–110 m (184–361 ft)
- Width: 2.85 m (9 ft 4 in)
- Height: 4.29 m (14 ft 1 in)
- Prime mover: 4 or 6 × MAN D2676LE62X
- Traction motors: 4 or 6 × Alstom 12 LCS 2939 C 450 kW (600 hp) permanent magnet synchronous motor
- Power output: 4-car sets: 1,800 kW (2,400 hp); 6-car sets: 2,700 kW (3,600 hp)
- Electric systems: Overhead line: 25 kV 50 Hz AC; 15 kV 16.7 Hz AC; 1,500 V DC
- UIC classification: 4-car sets: Bo′+2′+2′+2′+Bo′; 6-car sets: Bo′+2′+2′+2′+Bo′+2′+2′+Bo′
- Track gauge: 1,435 mm (4 ft 8 1/2 in) standard gauge

The Régiolis is a category of multiple unit train mainly for the French regional rail market, originally developed by Alstom as part of the Coradia family.

Since 2022, the Régiolis platform has been part of Construcciones y Auxiliar de Ferrocarriles (CAF)'s portfolio. The platform had to be sold by Alstom as part of their acquisition of Bombardier Transportation. Bombardier was Alstom's main rival in French regional train manufacturing with its Regio 2N/Omnéo platform, which continues to be produced by Alstom now.

The first train was presented on July 4, 2013, in Aquitaine, and the first commissioning took place on April 22, 2014, on the TER Aquitaine network, more than a year behind the initial schedule.

== History ==
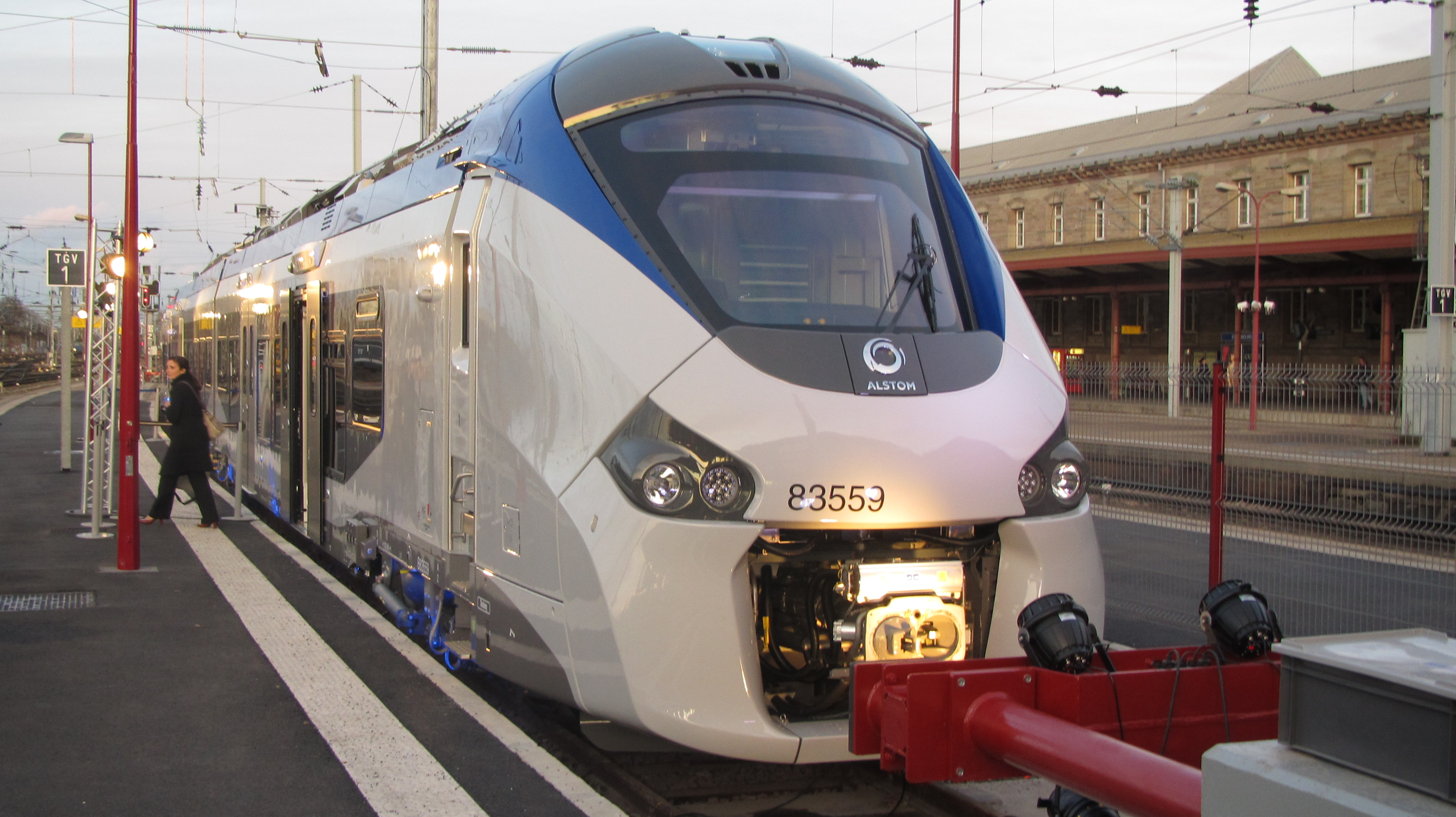
Presentation of the first Regiolis trainset, in Strasbourg on December 5, 2011

In the 2000s, the delivery of several hundred new trains, X TER, A TER, AGC, or TER 2N NG provided significant modernizations of the regional electrical and diesel fleet. However, in the early 2010s, old types of rolling stock dating from the 1970s and 1980s continued to operate, it became necessary to continue the renewal and growth of the fleet during the period 2013–2022 due increasing TER network usage. This desire manifested itself with a call for tenders from SNCF, for the design of a new type of train, the "versatile carrier" ("porteur polyvalent" in French). Following the Grenelle Environnement and the successful usage of AGC dual-mode equipment, this equipment must not only have a diesel version, but electrical and dual-mode versions, to avoid any usage of the diesel engines where overhead catenary is available.

While Bombardier Transportation won a few years ago the contract for 700 AGC trains for the TER, Alstom won the contract this time, allowing the manufacturer to manufacture new equipment for French regional traffic. The imagined train, the Régiolis, is offered in electric and dual-mode-bicurrent version, allowing these trains to run on the entire French normal-gauge network, like the B 82500 of the competing manufacturer Bombardier. In addition, a tricurrent version with 15 kV at a frequency of 16.7 Hz is also available, allowing cross-border services to Germany and Switzerland. The Régiolis is presented as "a modular train that knows how to do everything" and proposed in three versions with three, four or six coaches, and three types of development, peri-urban, regional or intercity. Like the manufacturer's AGV, or Bombardier Z 50000 and Regio 2N, the train is designed with an articulated architecture, with the bogies arranged between the cars.

List of orders
Region	Cars	Series	Type	Service	Ordered
Auvergne-Rhône-Alpes	4	B 84500	Bi-mode, dual-voltage	Régional	12
Auvergne-Rhône-Alpes	4	Z 31500	Electric, tri-voltage	Régional	27
Bourgogne-Franche-Comté	4	Z 51500	Electric	Régional	24
Bourgogne-Franche-Comté	6	Z 5xxxx	Electric	Interville	16
Center-Loire Valley	4	B 84500	Bi-mode, dual-voltage	Régional	3
Grand Est	4	B 83500	Bi-mode, dual-voltage	Suburban	6
Grand Est	6	B 83500	Bi-mode, dual-voltage	Suburban	19
Grand Est	4	B 84500	Bi-mode, dual-voltage	Régional	10
Grand Est	6	B 85000	Bi-mode, dual-voltage	Intercités	24
Hauts-de-France	6	B 84500	Bi-mode, dual-voltage	Régional	17
Hauts-de-France	6	B 84500	Bi-mode, dual-voltage	Intercités	10
Hello Paris	6	-	-	-	13
Intercités	6	B 85000	Bi-mode, dual-voltage	Intercités	15
Intercités	4	Z 51500	Electric	Intercités	9
Normandy	6	B 84500	Bi-mode, dual-voltage	Interville	15
Normandy	4	B 84900	Bi-mode, dual-voltage	Régional	10
Nouvelle-Aquitaine	4	Z 51500	Electric	Régional	22
Nouvelle-Aquitaine	4	B 84500	Bi-mode, dual-voltage	Régional	20
Occitanie	4	B 83500	Bi-mode, dual-voltage	Suburban	25
Occitanie	4	B 84500	Bi-mode, dual-voltage	Régional	3
Occitanie	4	Z 54900	Electric	Suburban	26
Provence-Alpes-Côte d'Azur	4	B 84500	Bi-mode, dual-voltage	Régional	15
Pays de la Loire	4	B 84500	Bi-mode, dual-voltage	Régional	10
Pays de la Loire	4	Z 51500	Electric	Régional	10
					361

== Operators and routes ==
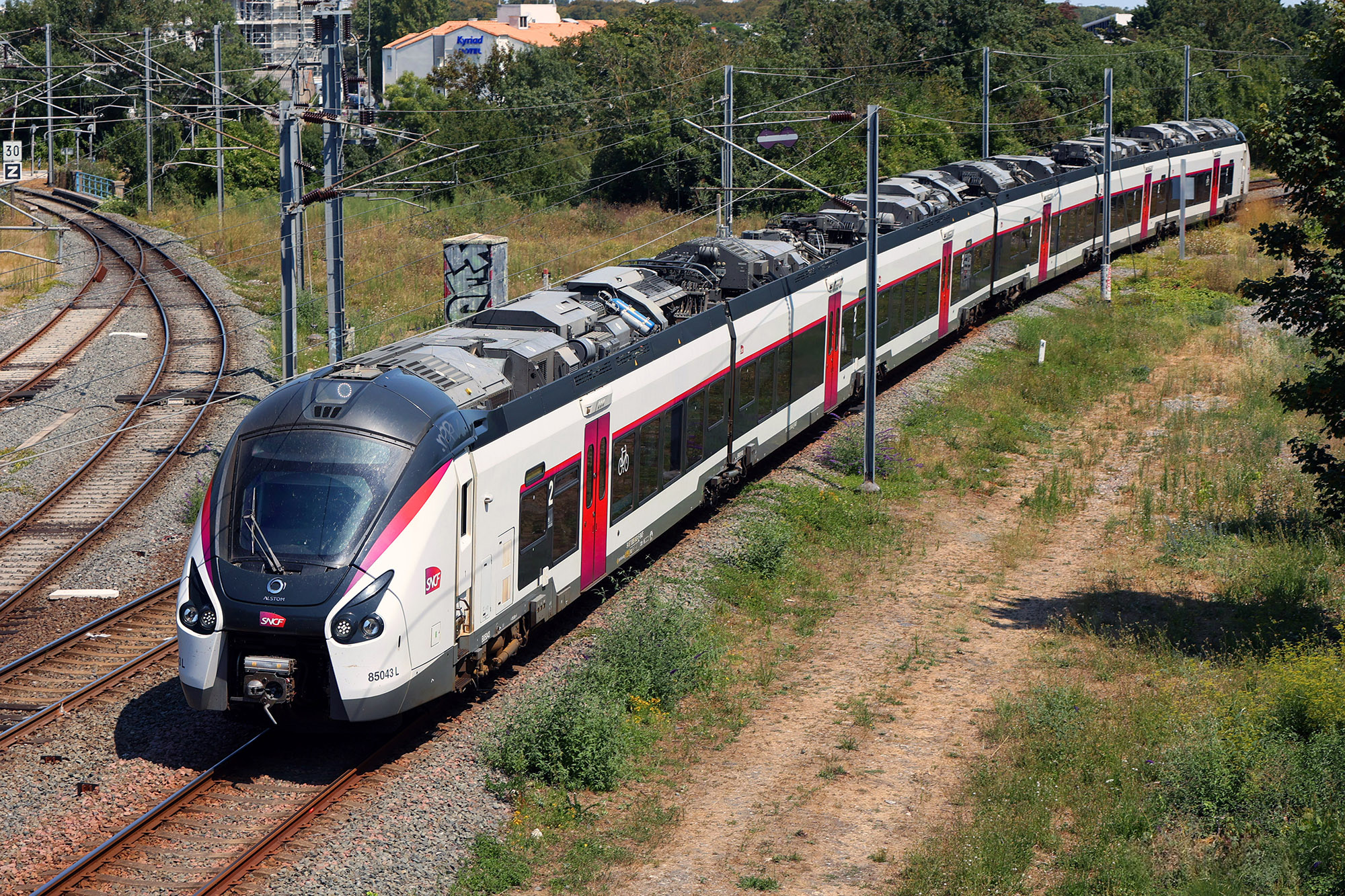
A Coradia Liner IC Class B 85000

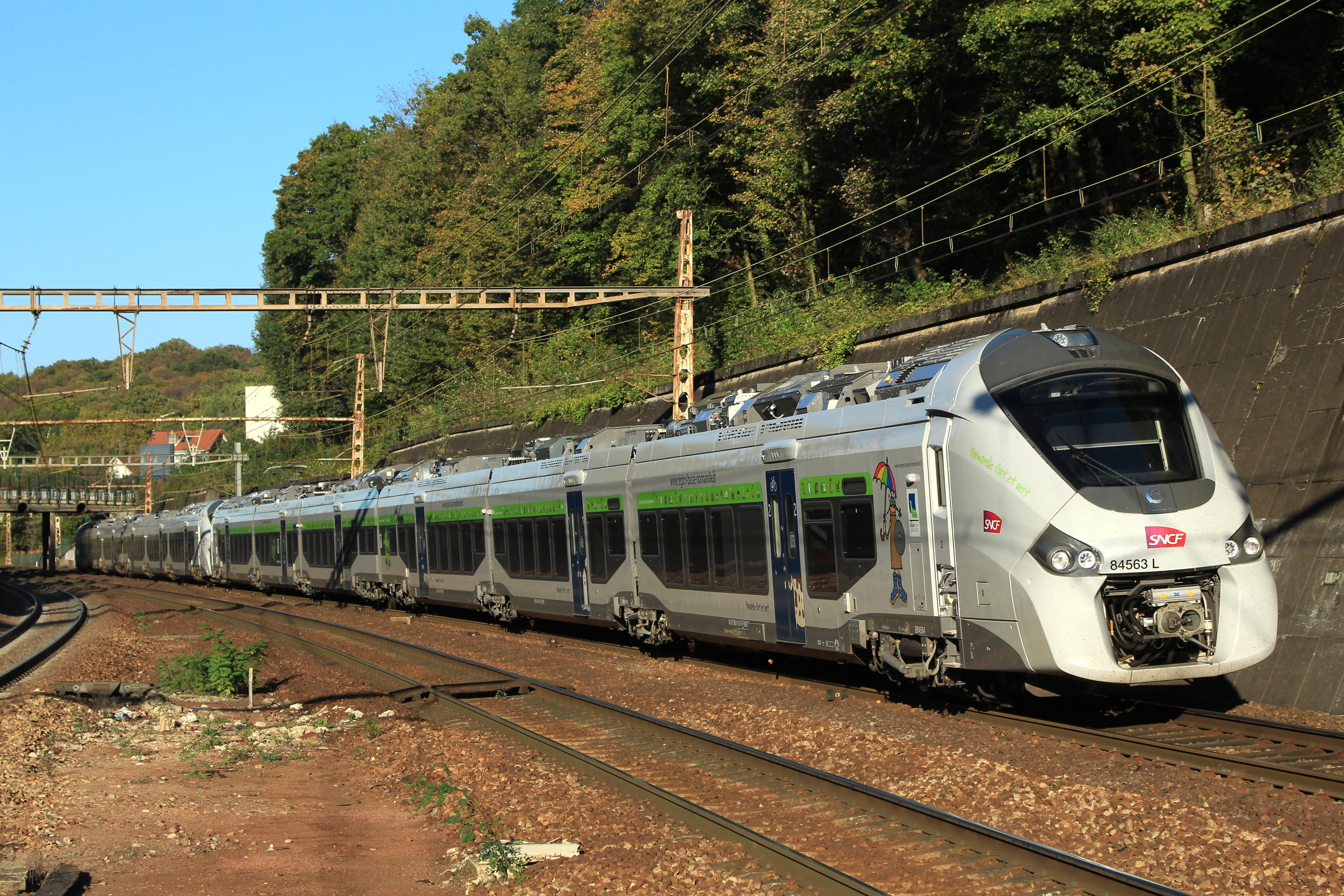
A double Coradia Régiolis Class B 84500 in TER Basse-Normandy livery passing through Chaville-Rive-Gauche

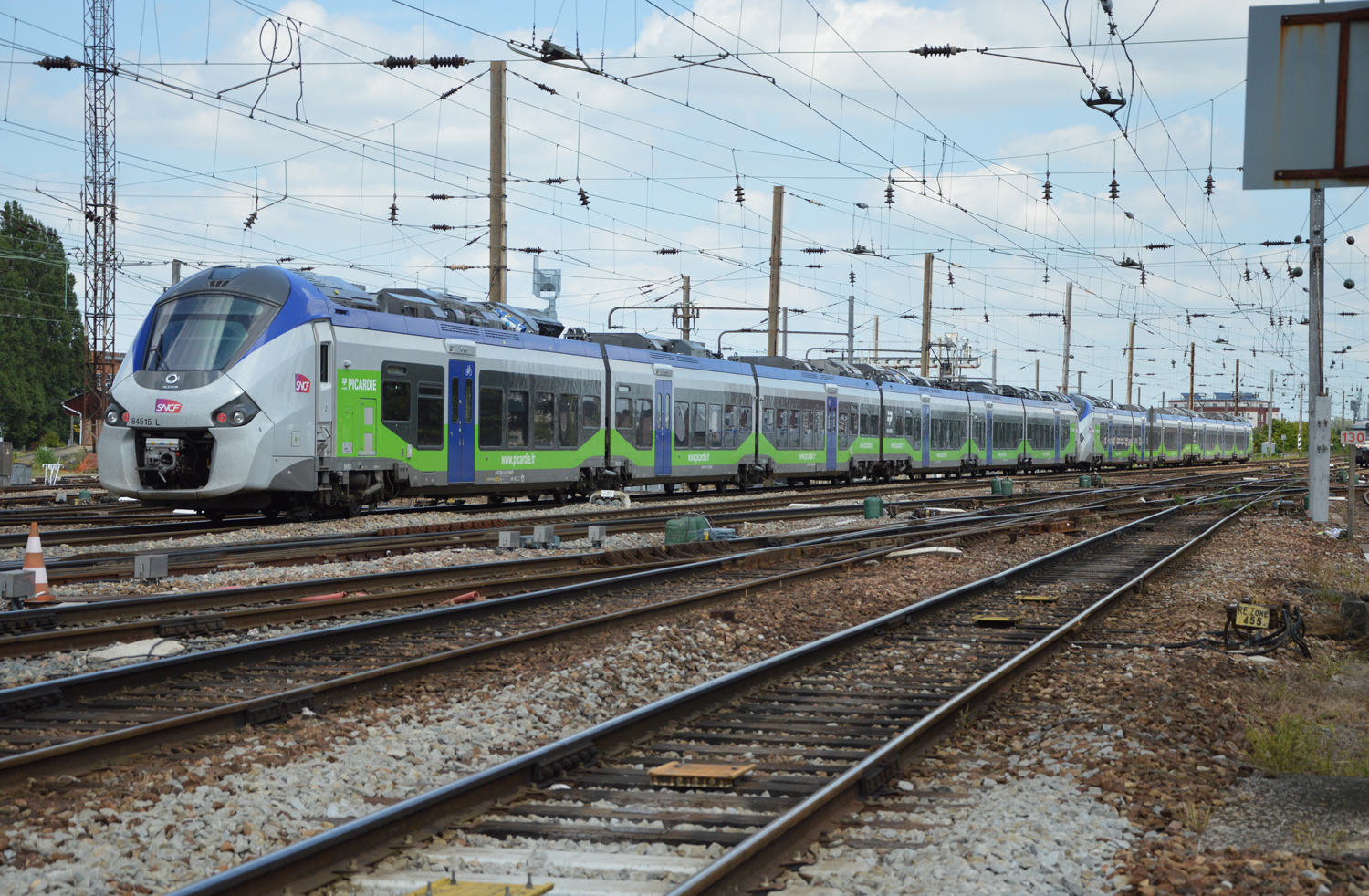
A double Coradia Régiolis Class B 84500 in TER Hauts-de-France livery on approach Lille-Flanders

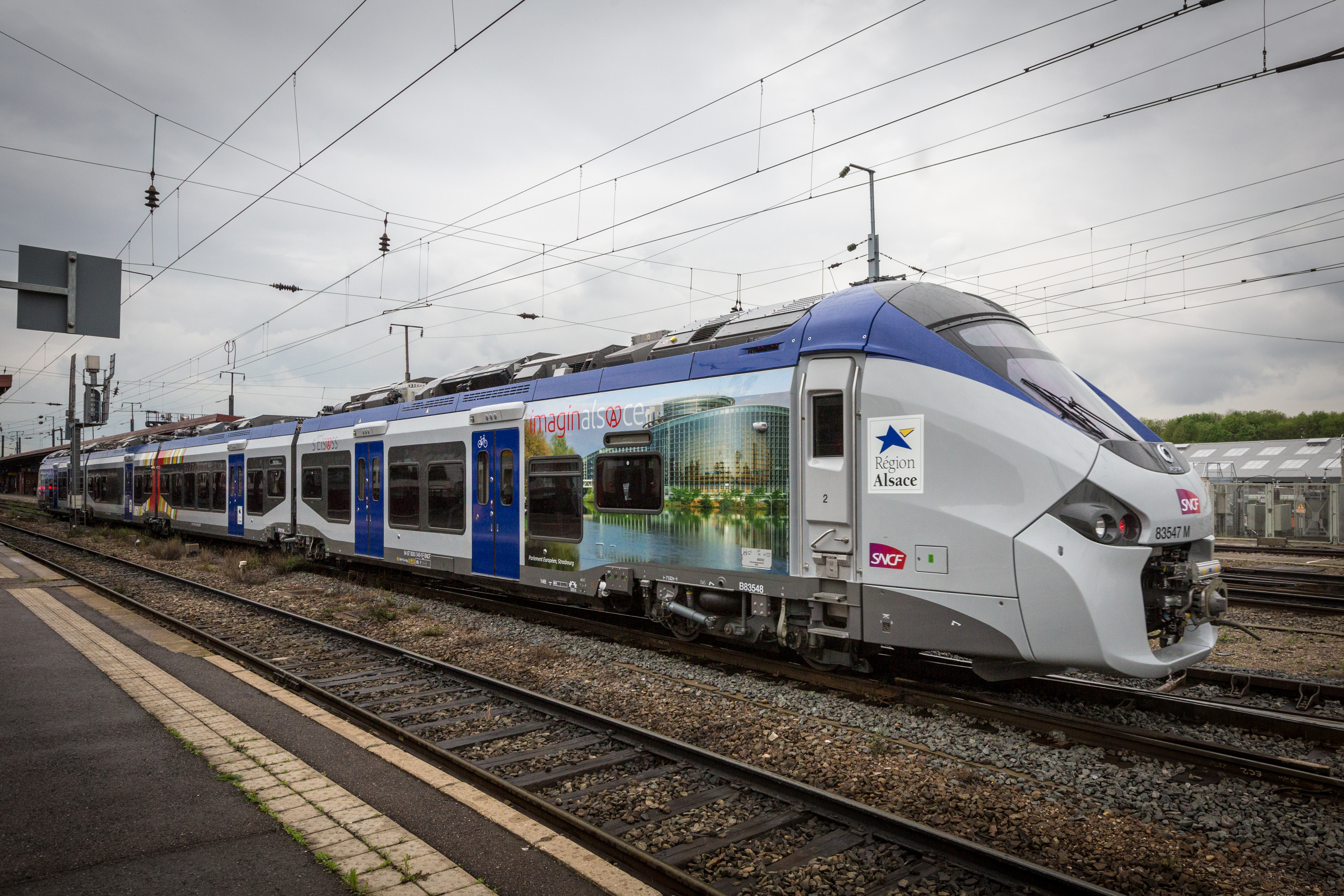
A Coradia Régiolis Class B 83500 in TER Alsace livery at Strasbourg

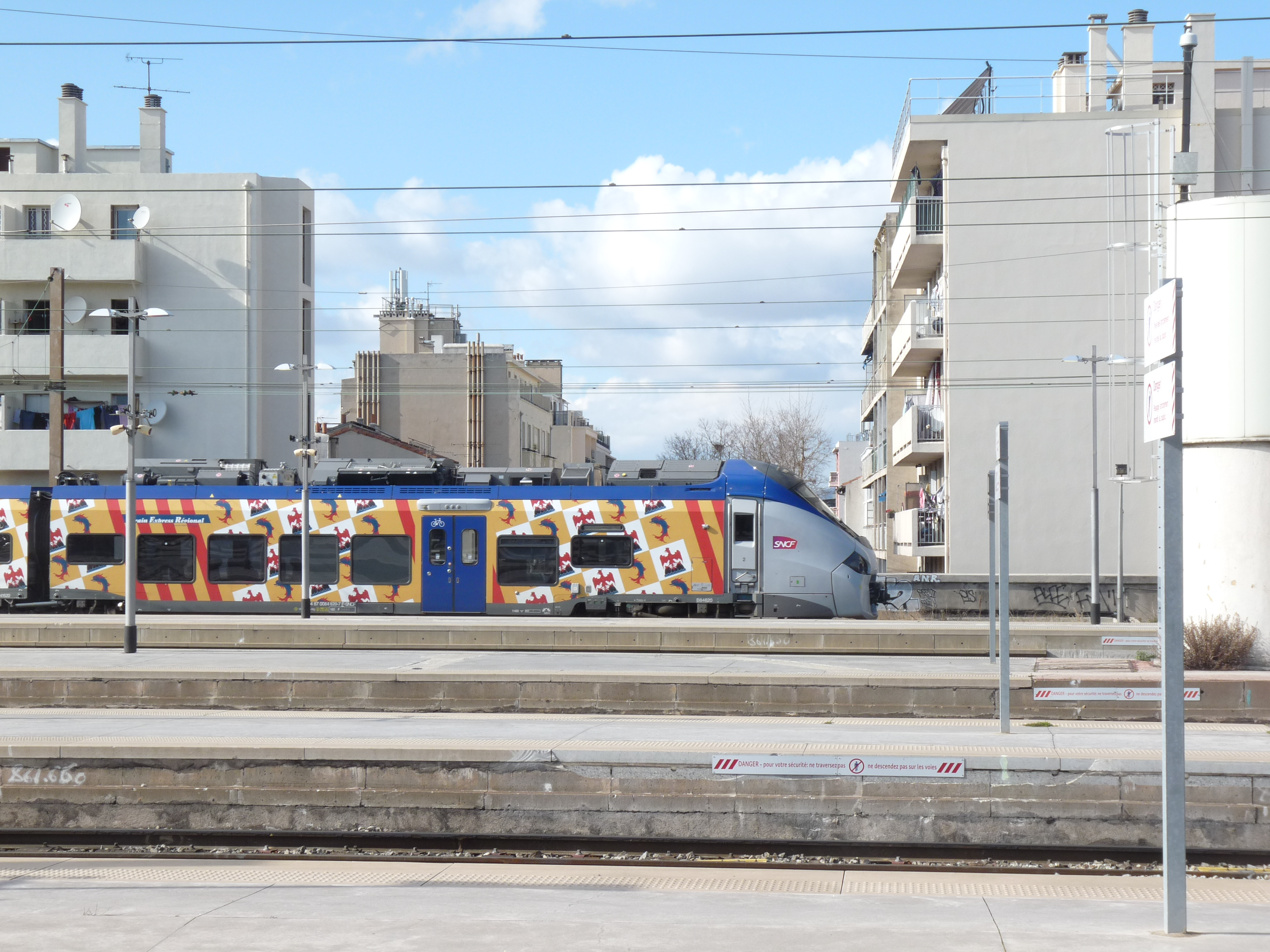
A Coradia Régiolis Class B 84500 in TER Provence-Alpes-Côte d'Azur livery at Marseille-Saint-Charles

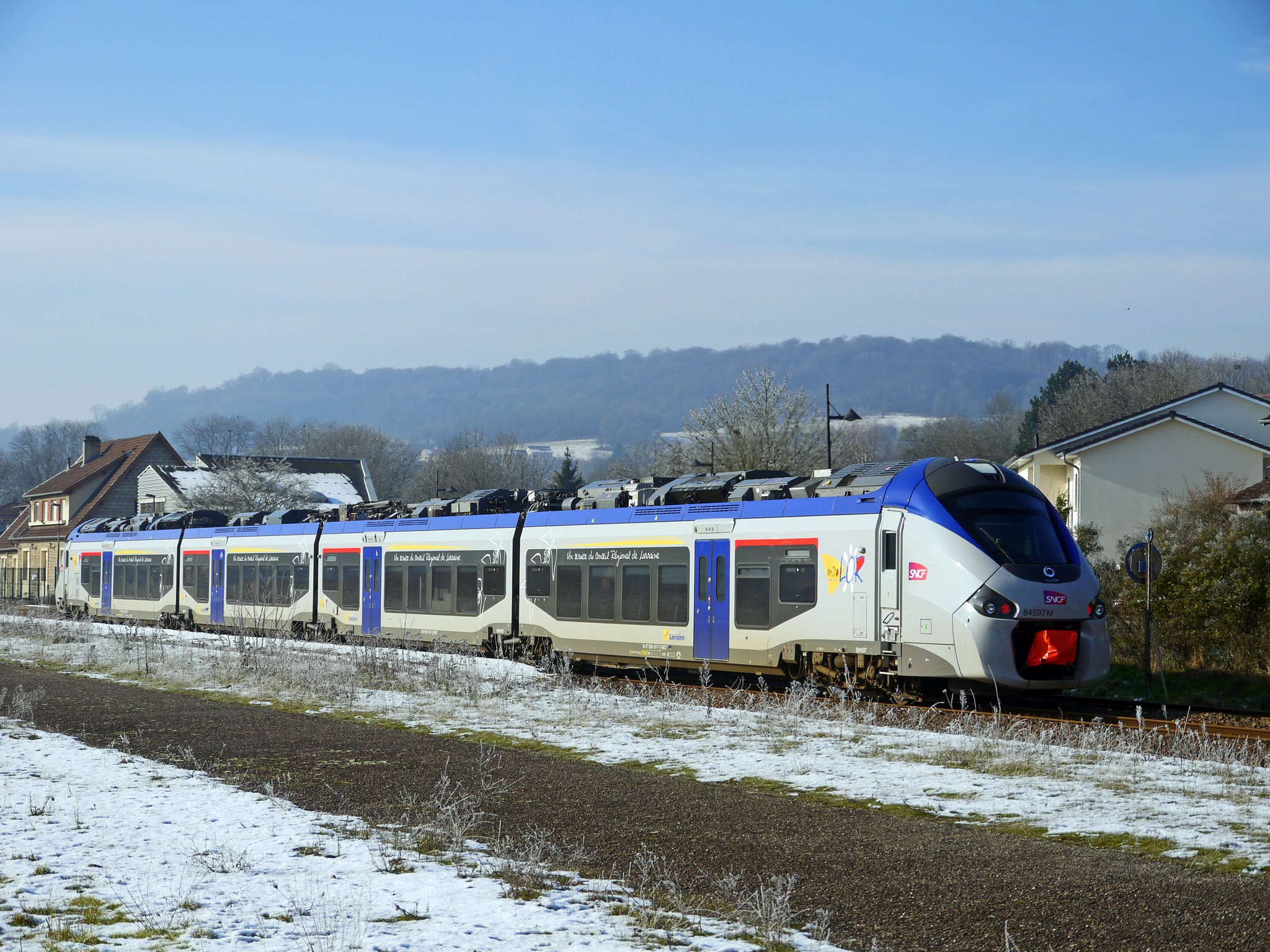
A Coradia Régiolis Class B 84500 in TER Lorraine livery at Ludres

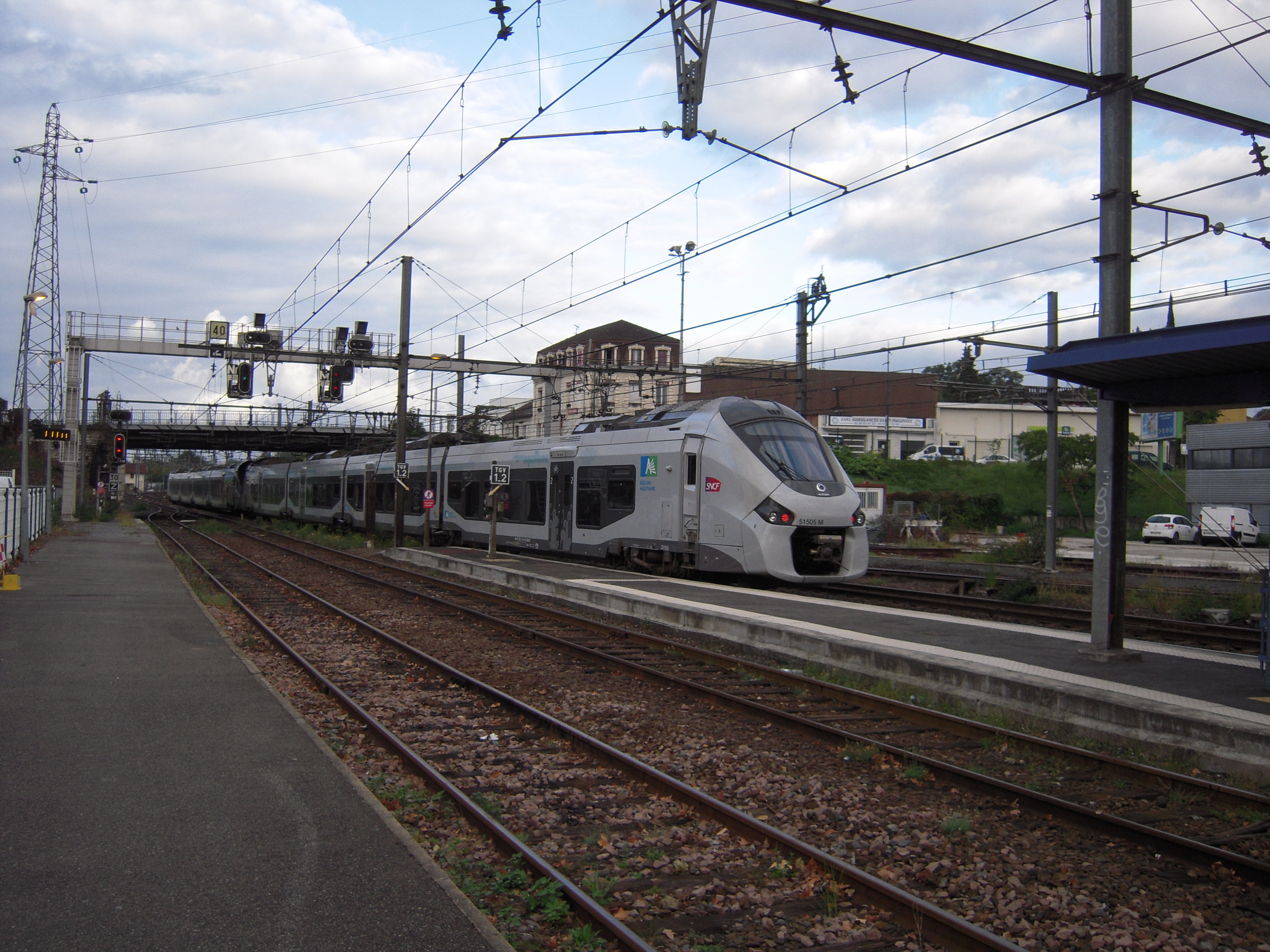
A double Régiolis Class Z 51500 in TER Aquitaine livery to Hendaye

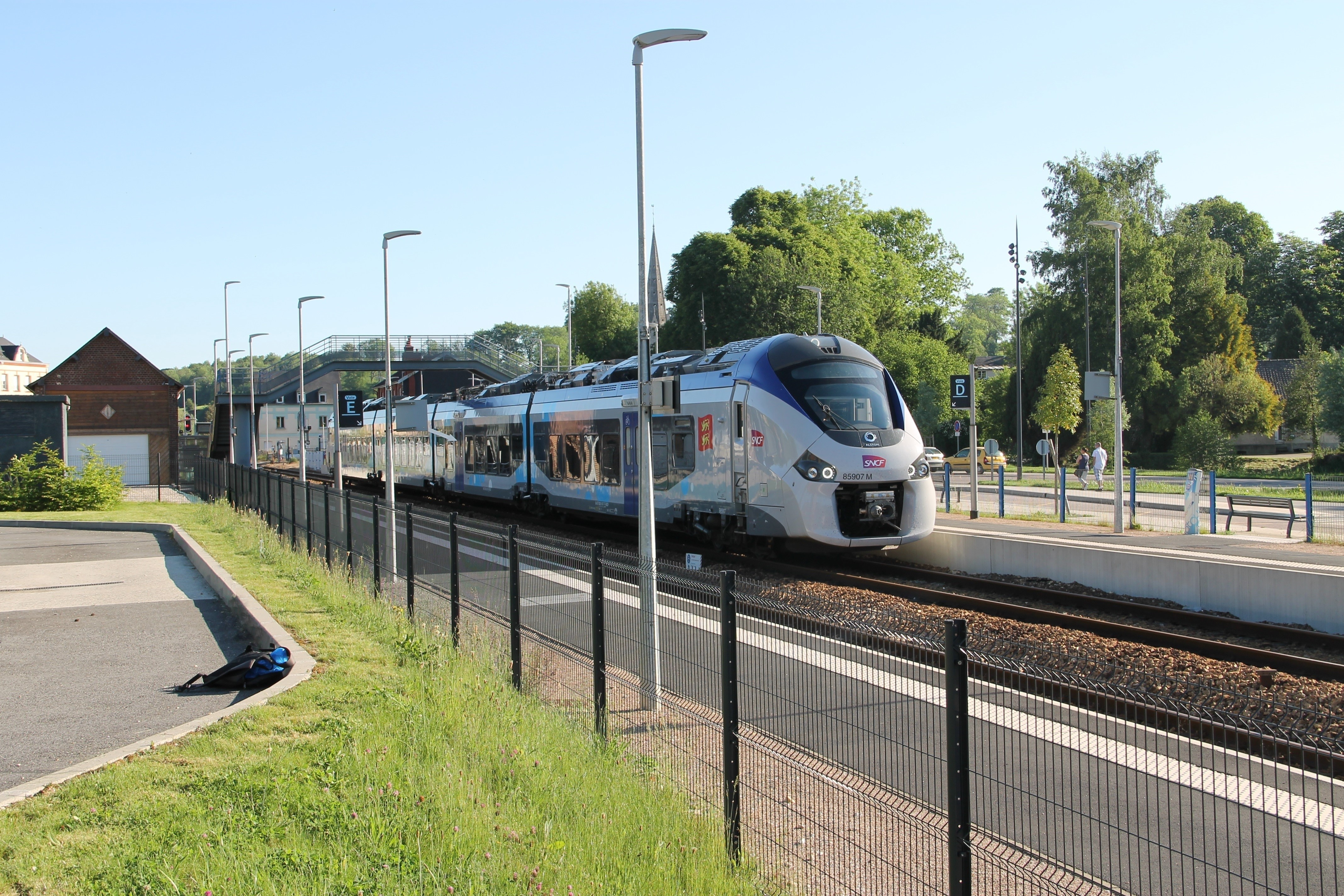
A Coradia Régiolis Class B 85900 in TER Haute-Normandy livery from Dieppe-Rouen to Auffay

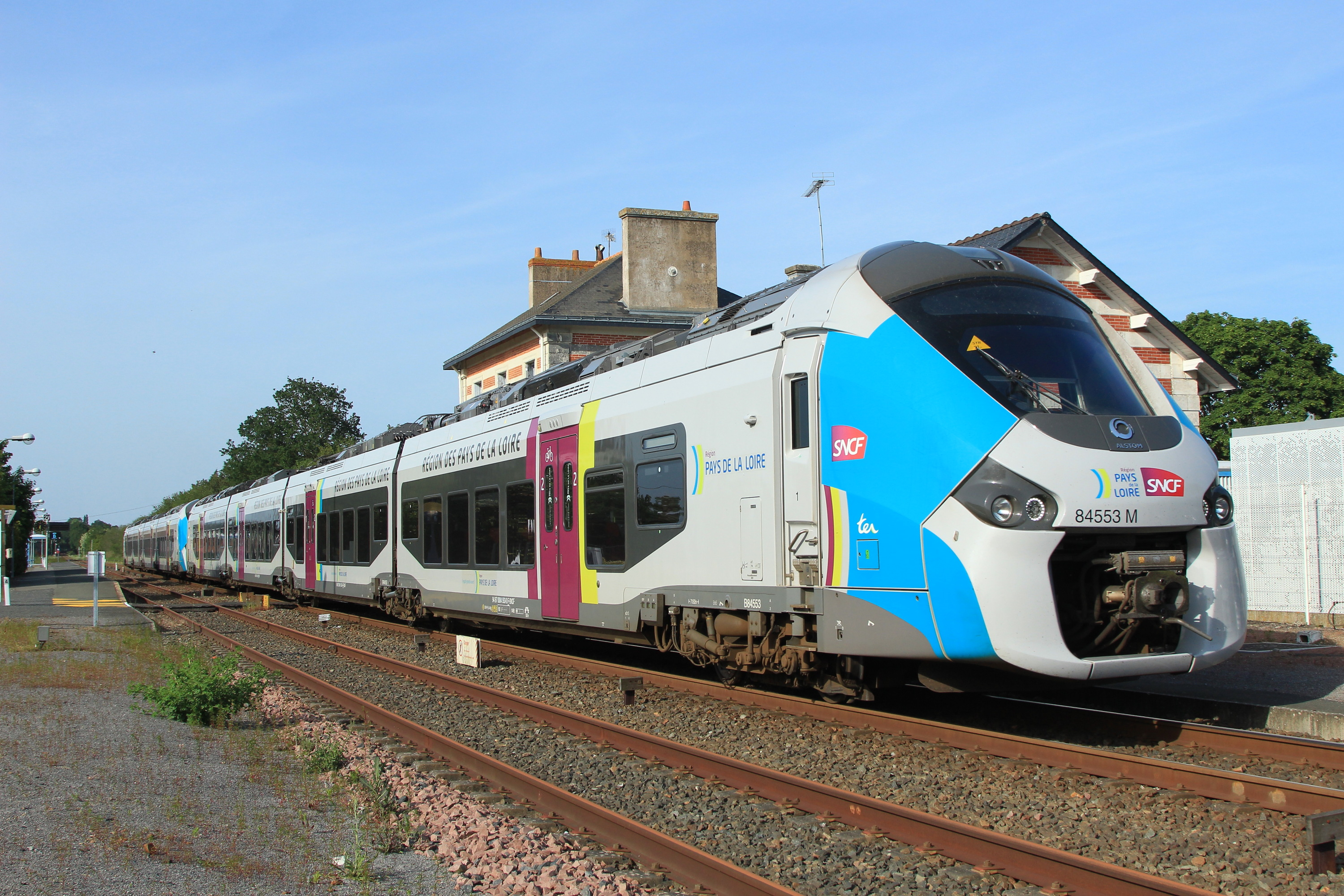
A double Coradia Régiolis Class B 84500 in TER Pays de la Loire livery at Chemillé

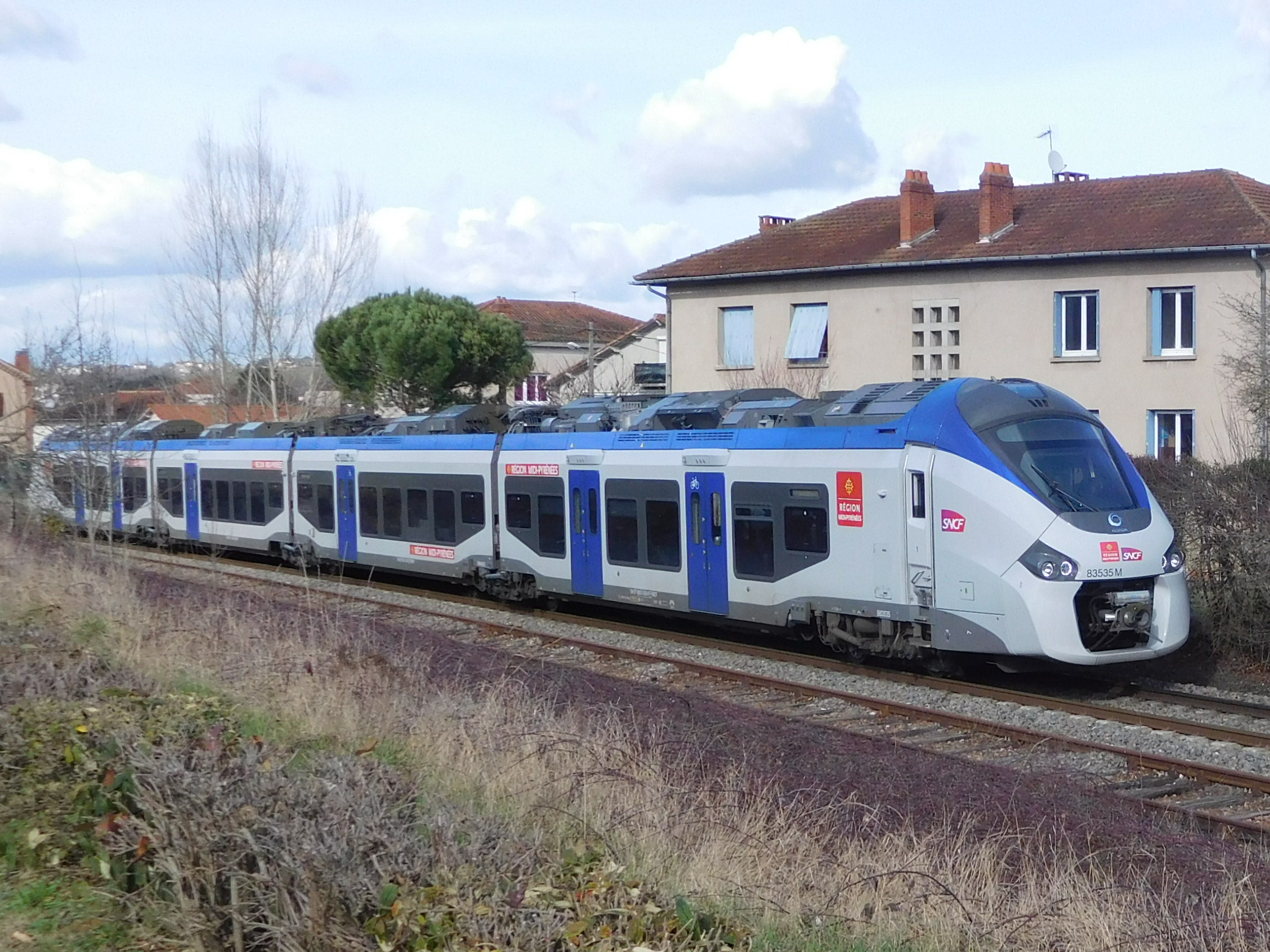
A Coradia Régiolis Class B 83500 in TER Midi-Pyrénées livery at Carmaux

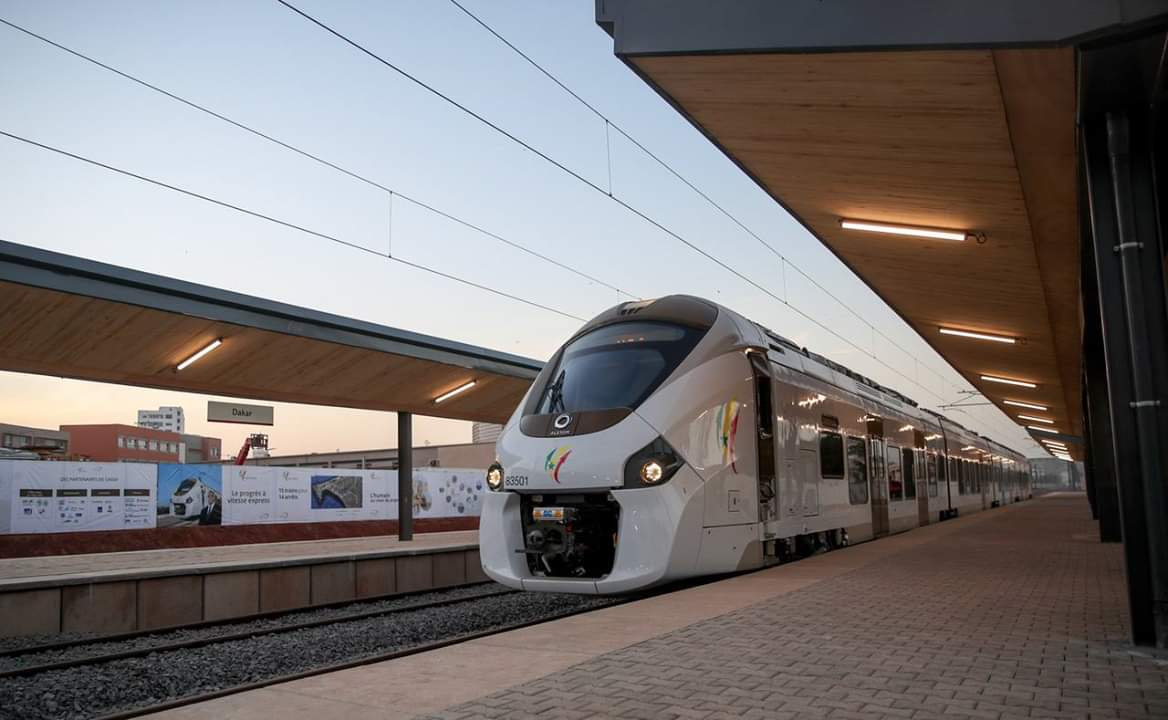
Senegal

=== Intercités ===
- Nantes – Bordeaux
- Nantes – Lyon
- Paris – Granville
- Paris – Boulogne-sur-Mer
- Clermont-Ferrand – Nîmes via Le Cévenol
- Bourges – Montluçon
- Toulouse – Hendaye
- Bordeaux – Ussel
- Bordeaux – Limoges

=== TER ===
==== TER Auvergne-Rhône-Alpes ====
- Clermont-Ferrand – Lyon
- Clermont-Ferrand – Moulins – Nevers
- Clermont-Ferrand – Vic-le-Comte
- Clermont-Ferrand – Thiers
- Clermont-Ferrand – Gannat
- Clermont-Ferrand – Brioude

===== Léman Express =====
- L1 : Coppet – Genève – Annemasse – Thonon – Évian
- L2 : Coppet – Genève – Annemasse – La Roche-sur-Foron – Annecy
- L3 : Coppet – Genève – Annemasse – La Roche-sur-Foron – Saint-Gervais-Le Fayet
- L4 : Coppet – Genève – Annemasse
- L5 : Genève – La Plaine
- L6 : Genève – Bellegarde

==== TCR Bourgogne-Franche-Comté ====
- Dijon-Ville – Dole – Besançon-Viotte
- Besançon-Viotte – Belfort
- Belfort – Besançon-Viotte – Lons-le-Saunier – Bourg-en-Bresse – Lyon-Part-Dieu

==== TER Centre-Val de Loire ====
- Bourges – Montluçon.

==== TER Grand Est ====
- Strasbourg – Molsheim – Barr – Saint-Dié-des-Vosges
- Strasbourg – Bischwiller – Haguenau ( – Soultz-sous-Forêts – Wissembourg)
- Mulhouse – Bâle
- Colmar – Metzeral
- Strasbourg – Offenburg
- Strasbourg – Mulhouse
- Strasbourg – Sarreguemines
- Strasbourg – Nancy / Metz
- Strasbourg – Roeschwoog – Gare de Lauterbourg
- Épinal – Saint-Dié
- Nancy – Pont-St-Vincent – Contrexéville – Culmont-Chalindrey
- Nancy – Épinal – Belfort
- Nancy – Épinal – Remiremont
- Nancy – Lunéville – Saint-Dié

==== TER Hauts-de-France ====
- Amiens – Laon
- Paris-Nord – Amiens – Boulogne
- Paris-Nord – Laon
- Amiens – Paris-Nord
- Amiens – Lille-Flandres
- Amiens – Calais-Ville

==== TER Normandie ====
- Rouen – Dieppe

==== TER Nouvelle-Aquitaine ====
- Bordeaux-Saint-Jean – Agen
- Bordeaux-Saint-Jean – Langon
- Bordeaux-Saint-Jean – Hendaye
- Bordeaux-Saint-Jean – Pointe de Grave
- Bordeaux-Saint-Jean – Pau
- Bordeaux-Saint-Jean – Coutras
- Bordeaux-Saint-Jean – Libourne – Coutras – Angouleme
- Tarbes – Hendaye
- La Rochelle – Poitiers
- La Rochelle – Bordeaux-Saint-Jean
- Bordeaux-Saint-Jean – Limoges
- Bordeaux-Saint-Jean – Ussel

==== TER Occitanie ====
- Toulouse – Agen
- Toulouse – Carmaux
- Toulouse – Rodez
- Toulouse – Mazamet
- Toulouse – Latour-de-Carol – Enveitg
- Toulouse – Pau
- Toulouse – Auch
- Toulouse – Avignon-Centre
- Toulouse – Brive-la-Gaillarde.

==== TER Pays de la Loire ====
- Nantes – Angers
- Nantes – Cholet
- Cholet – Angers
- Nantes – La Rochelle

==== TER Provence-Alpes-Côte d'Azur ====
- Avignon-TGV – Avignon-Centre
- Marseille – Arles – Avignon-Centre
- Toulon – Marseille
- Marseille-Saint-Charles – Miramas via Port-de-Bouc

=== Senegal ===
15 Trains Dakar – Airport

== Future Operators and Routes ==
=== CDG Express ===
The region Ile-de-France has not made orders for Regiolis trains. However, a link located only in this region, will operate by 2024 a dozen trains, specially designed for airport connections. These trains will be operated on the Charles de Gaulle Express, a new line directly connecting the Gare de Paris-Est to terminal 2 of the Paris Charles de Gaulle. These trains will be operated by a joint venture of Keolis (subsidiary of the SNCF) and the RATP.

- Paris Gare de-Est – Paris Charles de Gaulle Airport

=== Cross-border services to Germany ===
In 2019 the Région Grand Est ordered 30 Régiolis trains for regional services between France and Germany. As of December 2025, the deployment on cross-border services is planned in Spring 2026.

== Manufacturing and testing ==
On December 1, 2011, three workers making adjustments on Alstom's private test track in Tronville-en-Barrois (Meuse) were killed by a train under test. This railway test center tests all Régiolis trains.

This train is manufactured at several Alstom sites:

- Design: Saint-Ouen
- Design and assembly: Reichshoffen
- Engines: Ornans
- Bogies: Le Creusot
- Traction chains: Tarbes
- Embedded computing: Villeurbanne

The Régiolis received approval for commercial operation, issued by the EPSF in March 2014. The first trains circulated in April 2014 in Aquitaine, Picardy, Lorraine and Alsace.

The width of Regiolis and Regio 2N is incompatible with the gauge available in a number of stations. About 1,300 edges of platforms have had to be retouched to clear a few extra centimeters, to allow the passage of these new trains. The cost of this operation is estimated at 50 million euros. While this kind of minimal adaptations of infrastructure to new equipment is routine, the lack of anticipation and the fear of higher prices raised controversy in May 2014.

The first Régiolis, a Z 51500 four car, was introduced into commercial service more than a year behind the initial forecasts on April 22, 2014, in Aquitaine, on the Bordeaux–Agen route. The same day, Lorraine put into commercial service its first two-mode regional train B 84500 between Nancy and Saint-Dié-des-Vosges. Finally, six days later, on April 28, Alsace put into service a bi-mode element peri-urban B 83500 between Strasbourg and Sarreguemines. A month later, May 26, it was the turn of Picardy to introduce its first B 84500 on the Paris-Nord – Laon route.

=== Incident ===
As of May 7, 2018, all Regiolis (and Coradia Liner) trainsets are limited to the speed of the "V140" craft (imposing a speed limit of 140 km/h, as well as other speed reductions on certain portions). line). Indeed, during tests carried out in April, it was found, at 160 km/h, that the emergency braking distances exceeded those which allowed the approval of this type of equipment. This restriction, caused by premature aging of the brake linings which will therefore have to be replaced, should be lifted in October of the same year.

== See also ==
- List of SNCF classes
