= Beaucaire station =

Railway station in France

Beaucaire
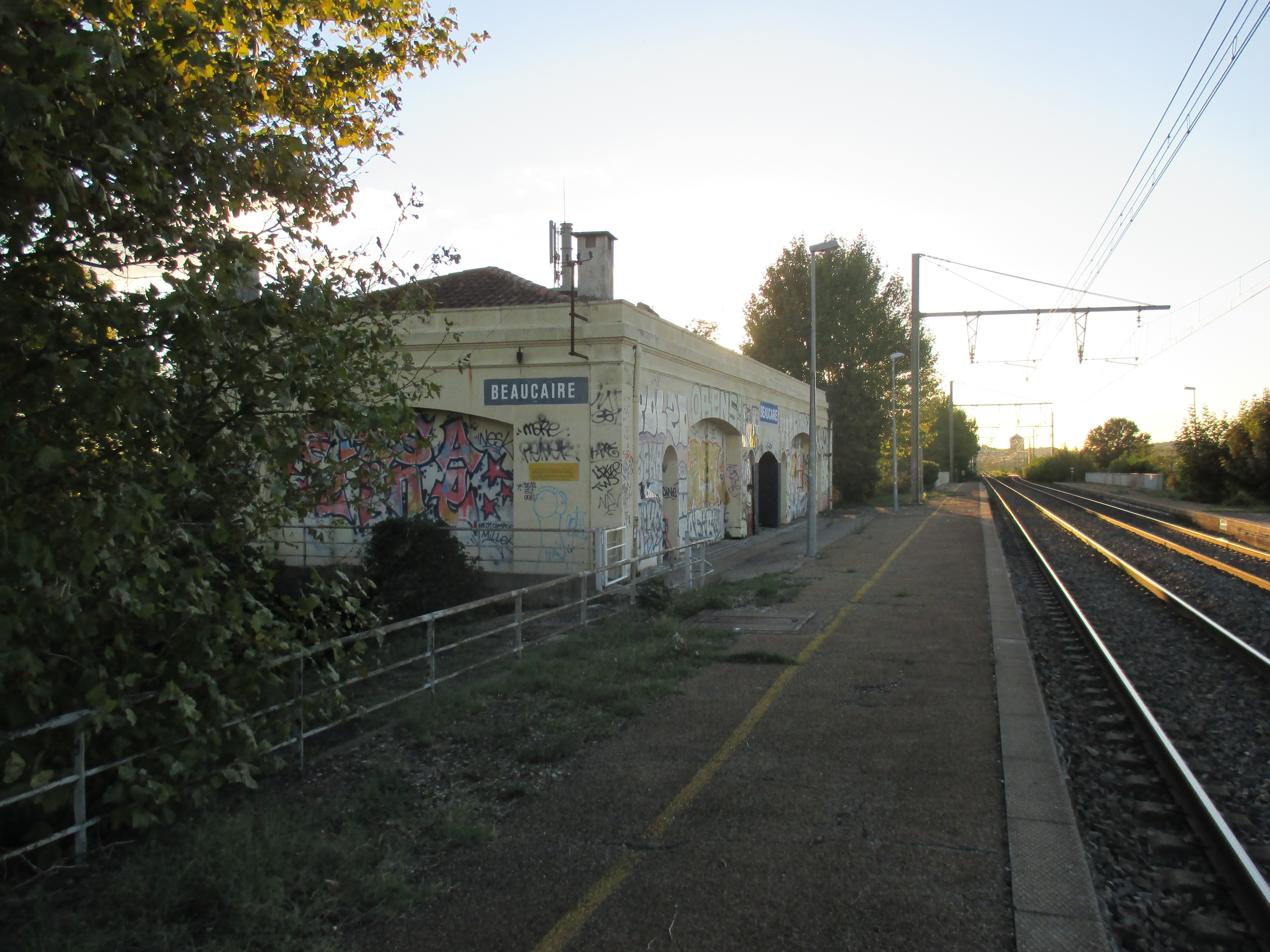
- Gare de Beaucaire

General information
- Location: Beaucaire, Gard, Occitanie, France
- Coordinates: 43.80224°N 4.64708°E
- Line: Tarascon–Sète railway

Other information
- Station code: 87775023

Services
Preceding station	TER Occitanie	Following station
Nîmes-Pont-du-Gard towards Narbonne	21	Tarascon towards Avignon-Centre
Location

Beaucaire station (French: Gare de Beaucaire) is a railway station in Beaucaire, Gard, Occitanie, southern France. Within TER Occitanie, it is part of line 21 (Narbonne–Avignon).
