= Nîmes-Pont-du-Gard station =

Railway station in Southern France

Nîmes Pont-du-Gard
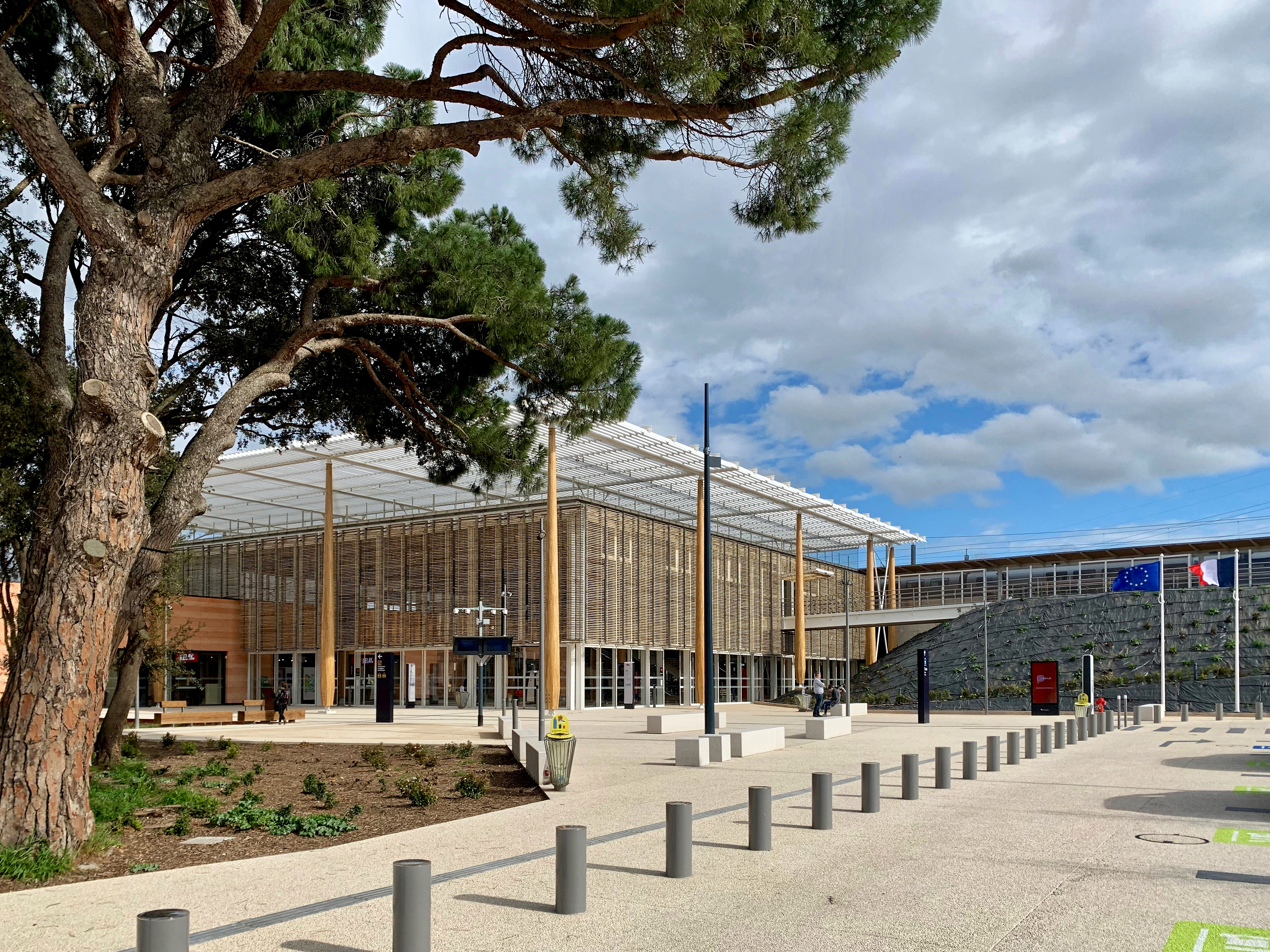

General information
- Location: Chemin de Jonquières, Mas Larrier – Connelle Nord; 30129 Manduel; France
- Coordinates: 43°49′01″N 4°30′25″E
- Owner: SNCF Réseau
- Operator: SNCF
- Lines: Contournement Nîmes – Montpellier; Tarascon–Sète-Ville

Construction
- Architect: AREP

Other information
- Station code: 87703975 (SNCF)

History
- Opened: 15 December 2019

Passengers
- 2024: 1,168,501

Services
Preceding station	SNCF	Following station
Valence TGV towards Paris-Lyon	TGV inOui	Montpellier Sud de France towards Perpignan
Preceding station	Ouigo	Following station
Valence TGV towards Tourcoing	Grande Vitesse	Montpellier Sud de France Terminus
Preceding station	TER Occitanie	Following station
Nîmes towards Narbonne	21	Beaucaire towards Avignon-Centre
Nîmes towards Portbou	22	Tarascon towards Avignon-Centre
Location

Nîmes–Pont-du-Gard station (French: Gare de Nîmes-Pont-du-Gard) is a French TGV and TER train station in the communes of Manduel and Redessan, near Nîmes, in Southern France. It opened on 15 December 2019 on the Contournement Nîmes – Montpellier high-speed railway line (LGV) and Tarascon–Sète-Ville line.

== History ==
The name of the new station caused some confusion as it located some 12 km (7.4 mi) from Nîmes itself and 20 km (12.4 mi) from the Pont du Gard. After the project started in 2017, the station was opened on 15 December 2019 although no train operated during the first five days, due to a strike.

It was designed by AREP.

== Gallery ==
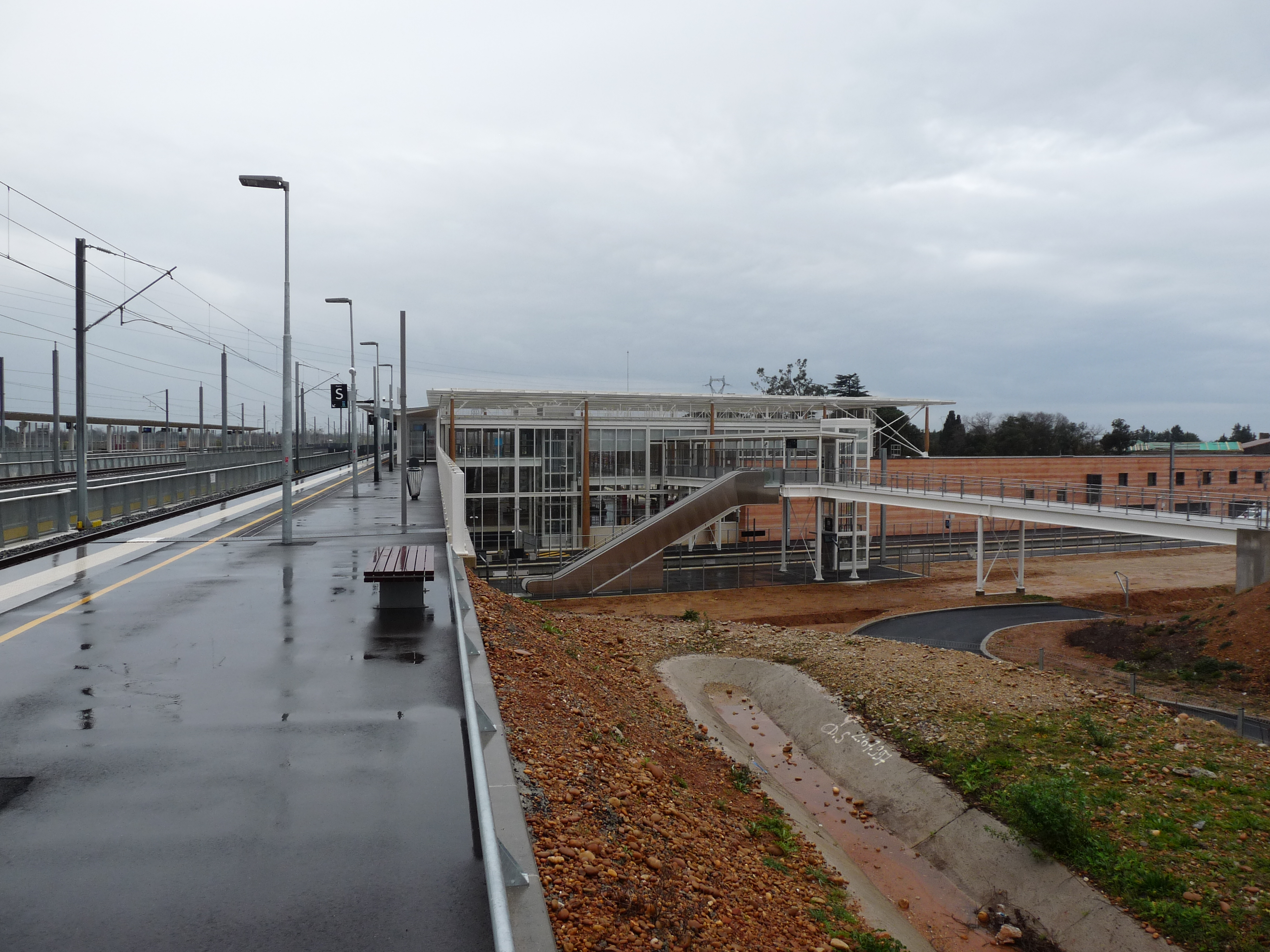
General view of the station

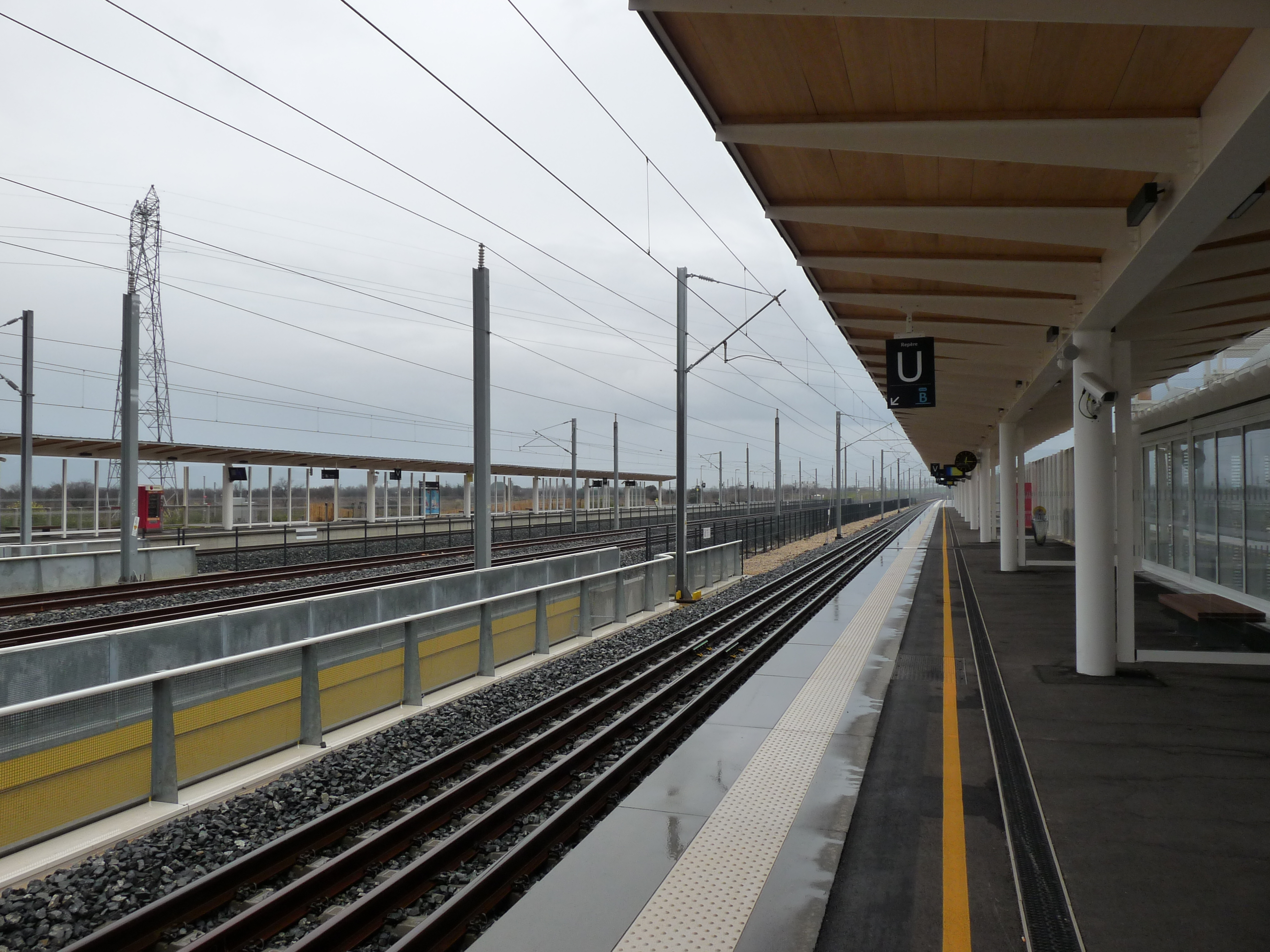
TGV platform

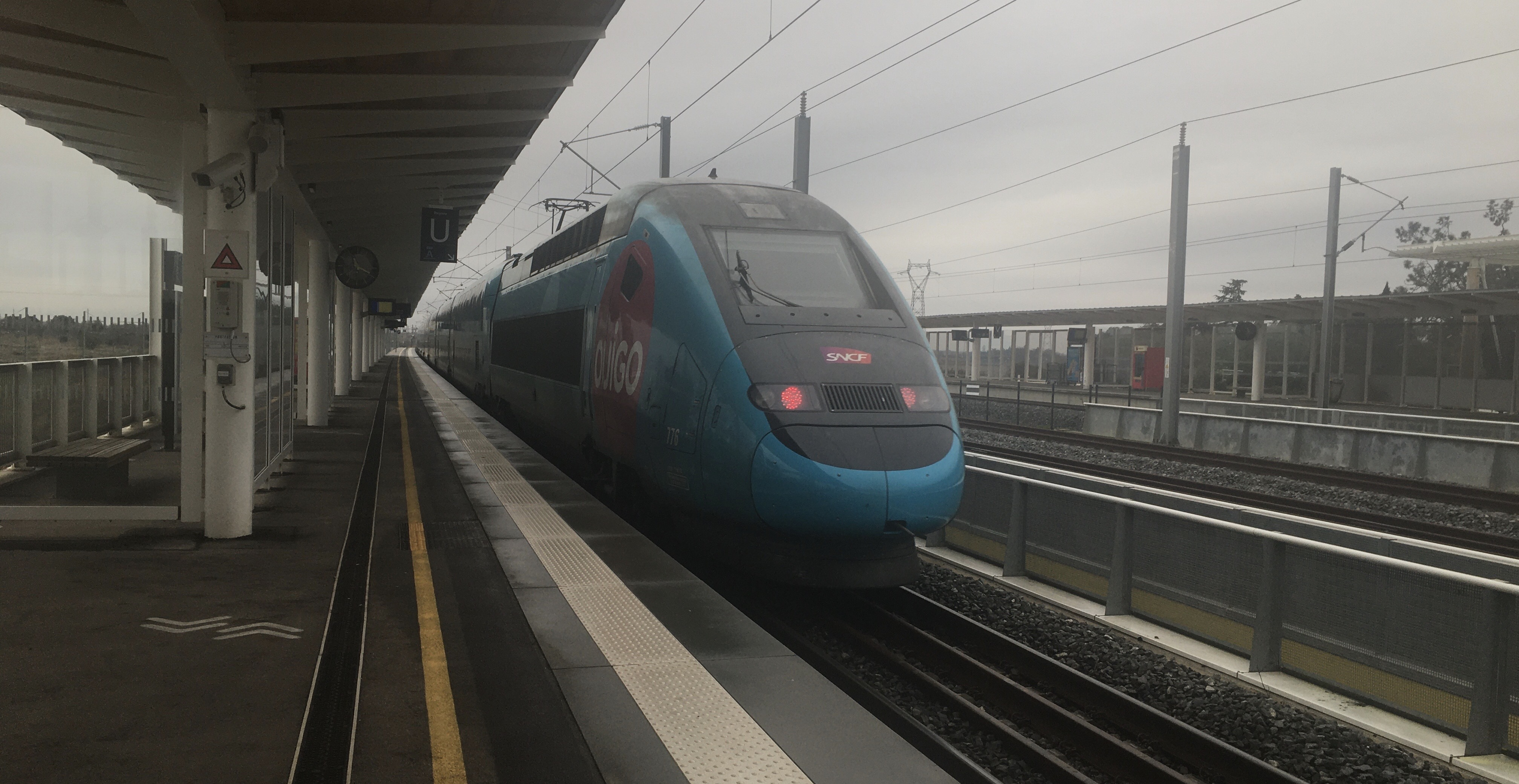
Ouigo at platform
