= Valence-Ville station =

Railway station in Valence, France

Coordinates: 44°55′41″N 4°53′34″E

Valence-Ville
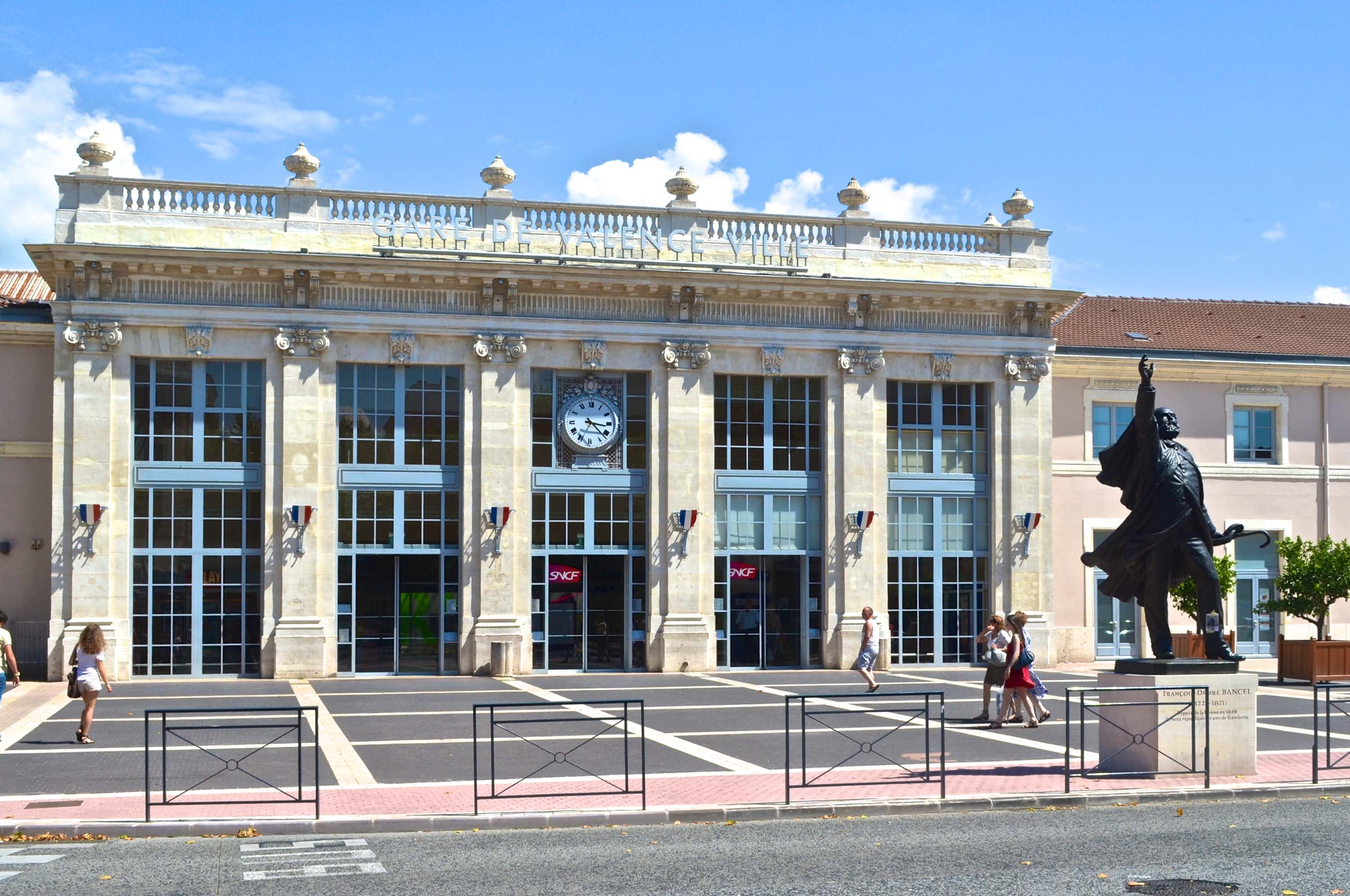

General information
- Location: 38, rue Denis Papin; 26000 Valence; Drôme; France
- Elevation: 123 m (404 ft)
- Owner: SNCF
- Operator: SNCF
- Lines: Paris–Marseille railway Valence–Moirans railway
- Platforms: 4
- Tracks: 7

Construction
- Architect: Louis-Jules Bouchot

History
- Opened: 29 June 1854

Passengers
- 2024: 2,917,986

Services
Preceding station	SNCF	Following station
Lyon Saint-Exupéry towards Paris-Lyon	TGV inOui	Montélimar towards Miramas
Preceding station	TER Auvergne-Rhône-Alpes	Following station
Terminus	2	Valence TGV towards Annecy or Geneva
Tain-l'Hermitage towards Lyon-Vaise	5	Livron towards Avignon-Centre
Terminus	61	Valence TGV towards Grenoble-Universités-Gières
Valence TGV towards Romans-Bourg-de-Péage	64	Livron towards Briançon
Preceding station	TER PACA	Following station
Tain-l'Hermitage towards Lyon-Part-Dieu	10	Montélimar towards Marseille
Location

Valence-Ville station (French: Gare de Valence-Ville) is a railway station serving the town Valence, Drôme department, southeastern France. It is situated on the Paris–Marseille railway, and is the southern terminus of a branch line to Grenoble.

The station is owned and operated by the SNCF and served by both TGV and TER Auvergne-Rhône-Alpes trains.

== Services ==
The station is served by regional trains to Lyon, Avignon and Grenoble, and a few high speed trains.
