= Lunel station =

Railway station in Lunel, France

Lunel
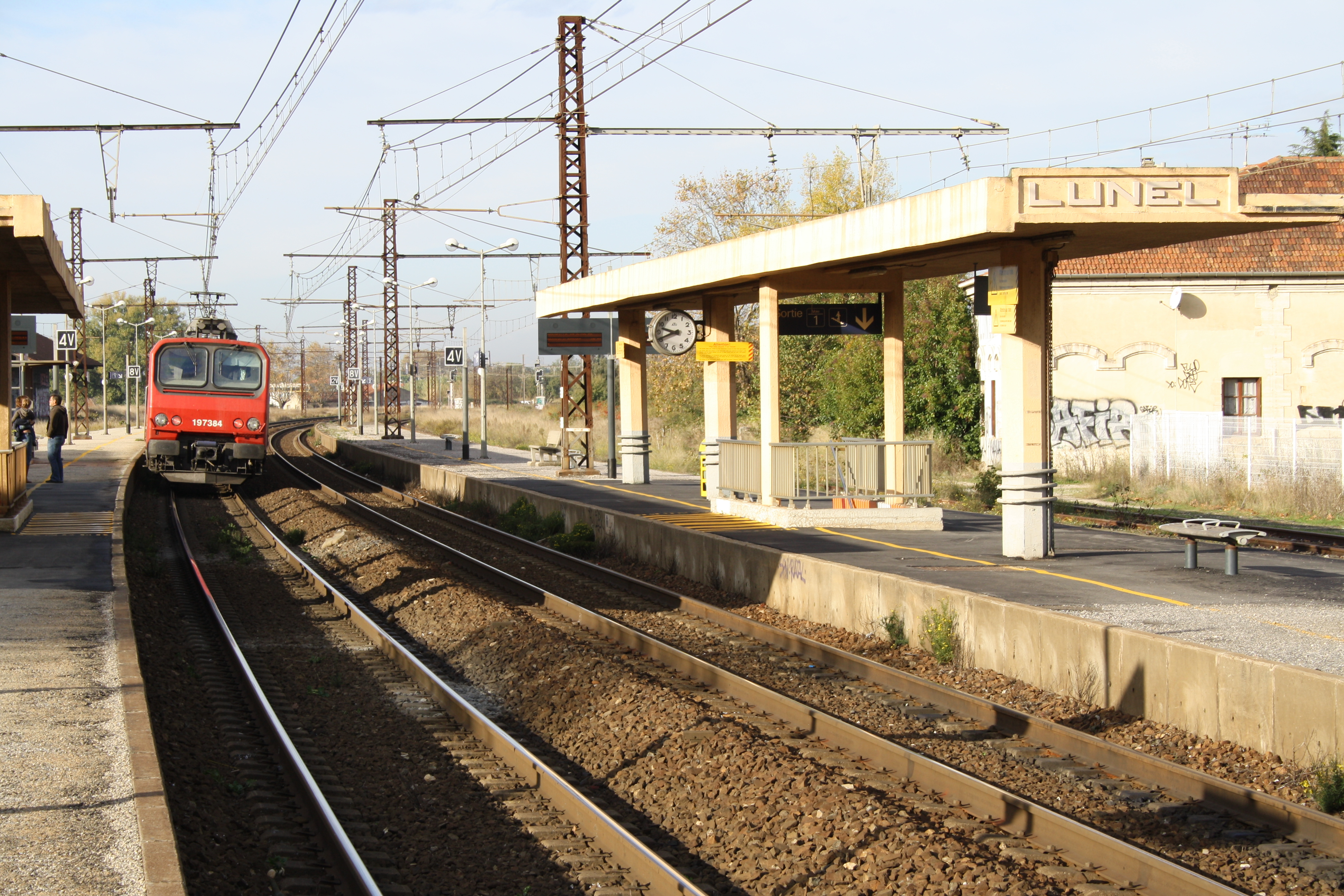
- Station platforms and tracks in 2009.

General information
- Location: Rue de Verdun; 34400 Lunel; Hérault, France
- Coordinates: 43.67939°N 4.13106°E
- Owner: SNCF
- Operator: SNCF
- Line: Tarascon–Sète railway

Other information
- Station code: 87773408

History
- Opened: 9 January 1845

Services
Preceding station	TER Occitanie	Following station
Montpellier towards Narbonne	6	Nîmes towards Marseille
Lunel-Viel towards Narbonne	21	Gallargues towards Avignon-Centre
Montpellier towards Portbou	22	Nîmes towards Avignon-Centre
Location

Lunel station (French: Gare de Lunel) is a French railway station in Lunel, Occitanie, southern France. Within the TER Occitanie network, it is served by line 6 (Narbonne–Marseille), 21 (Narbonne–Avignon), and 22 (Portbou–Avignon).
