= Nîmes station =

Railway station in Nîmes, France

Nîmes
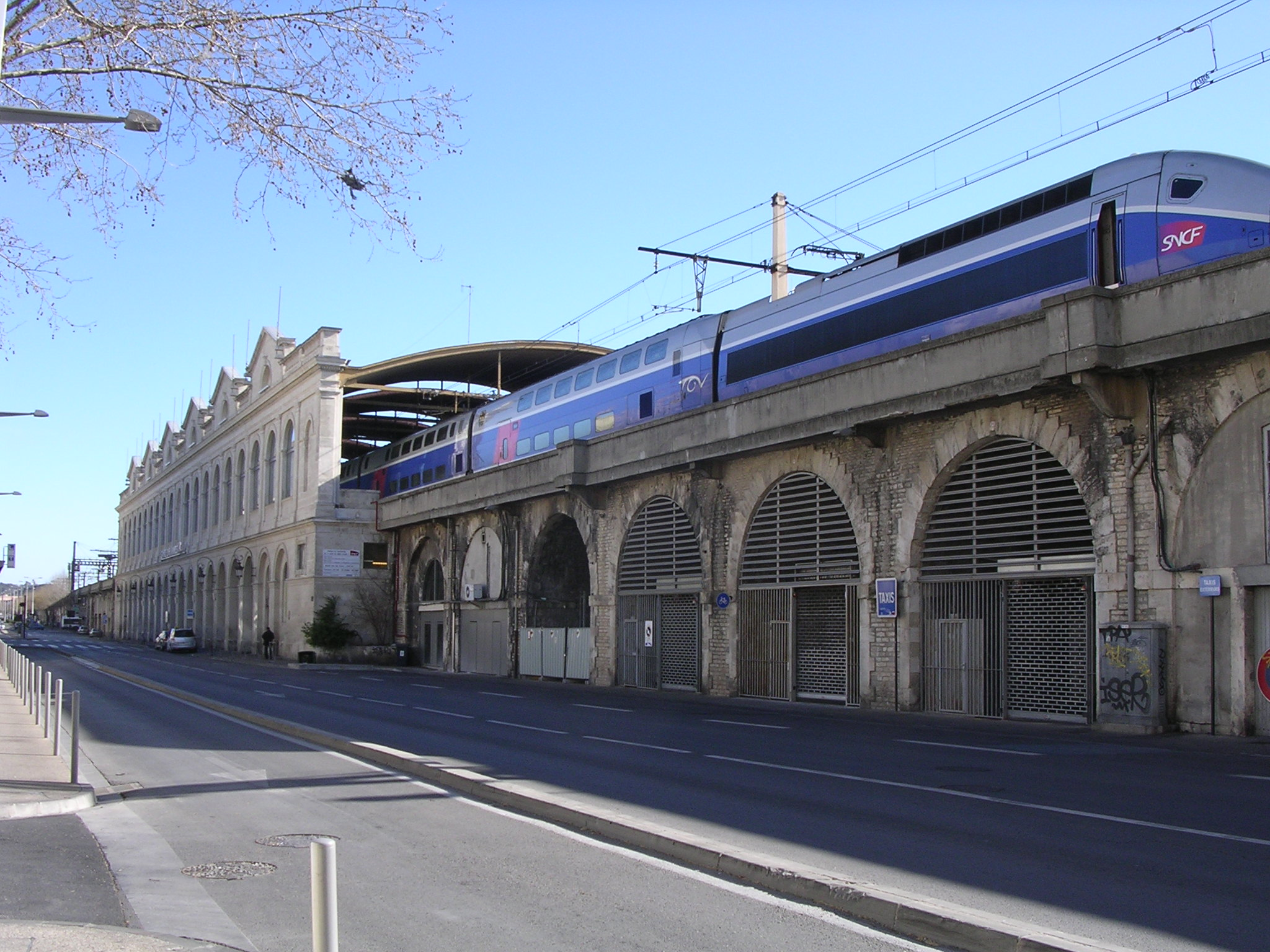
- Façade of the Nîmes station

General information
- Location: Nîmes, Gard, Occitanie; France
- Coordinates: 43°49′57″N 4°21′59″E
- Platforms: 4
- Tracks: 4 passenger, 2 freight

Other information
- Station code: 87775007

History
- Opened: 1845

Passengers
- 2024: 4,355,591
Services
Preceding station	Renfe Operadora	Following station
Avignon TGV towards Marseille-St-Charles	AVE	Montpellier-Saint-Roch towards Madrid Atocha
Valence TGV towards Lyon-Part-Dieu	AVE	Montpellier-Saint-Roch towards Barcelona Sants
Preceding station	SNCF	Following station
Valence TGV towards Paris-Lyon	TGV inOui	Montpellier Terminus
Valence TGV towards Paris-Lyon	TGV inOui	Montpellier towards Barcelona Sants
Valence TGV towards Paris-Lyon	TGV inOui	Montpellier towards Perpignan
Valence TGV towards Lyon-Part-Dieu	TGV inOui	Montpellier towards Toulouse
Montpellier towards Bordeaux	Intercités	Arles towards Marseille
Preceding station	Ouigo	Following station
Valence TGV towards Paris-Lyon	Grande Vitesse	Montpellier Terminus
Preceding station	TER Occitanie	Following station
Lunel towards Narbonne	6	Tarascon towards Marseille
Lunel towards Narbonne	21	Nîmes-Pont-du-Gard towards Avignon-Centre
Lunel towards Portbou	22	Nîmes-Pont-du-Gard towards Avignon-Centre
Terminus	26	Saint-Césaire towards Le Grau-du-Roi
Fons-Saint-Mamert towards Clermont-Ferrand or Mende	27	Terminus
Location

Nîmes station (IATA: ZYN) is a railway station in Nîmes, Gard département, France. It is located at 1 Boulevard Sergent Triaire, 30000 Nîmes.

== History ==
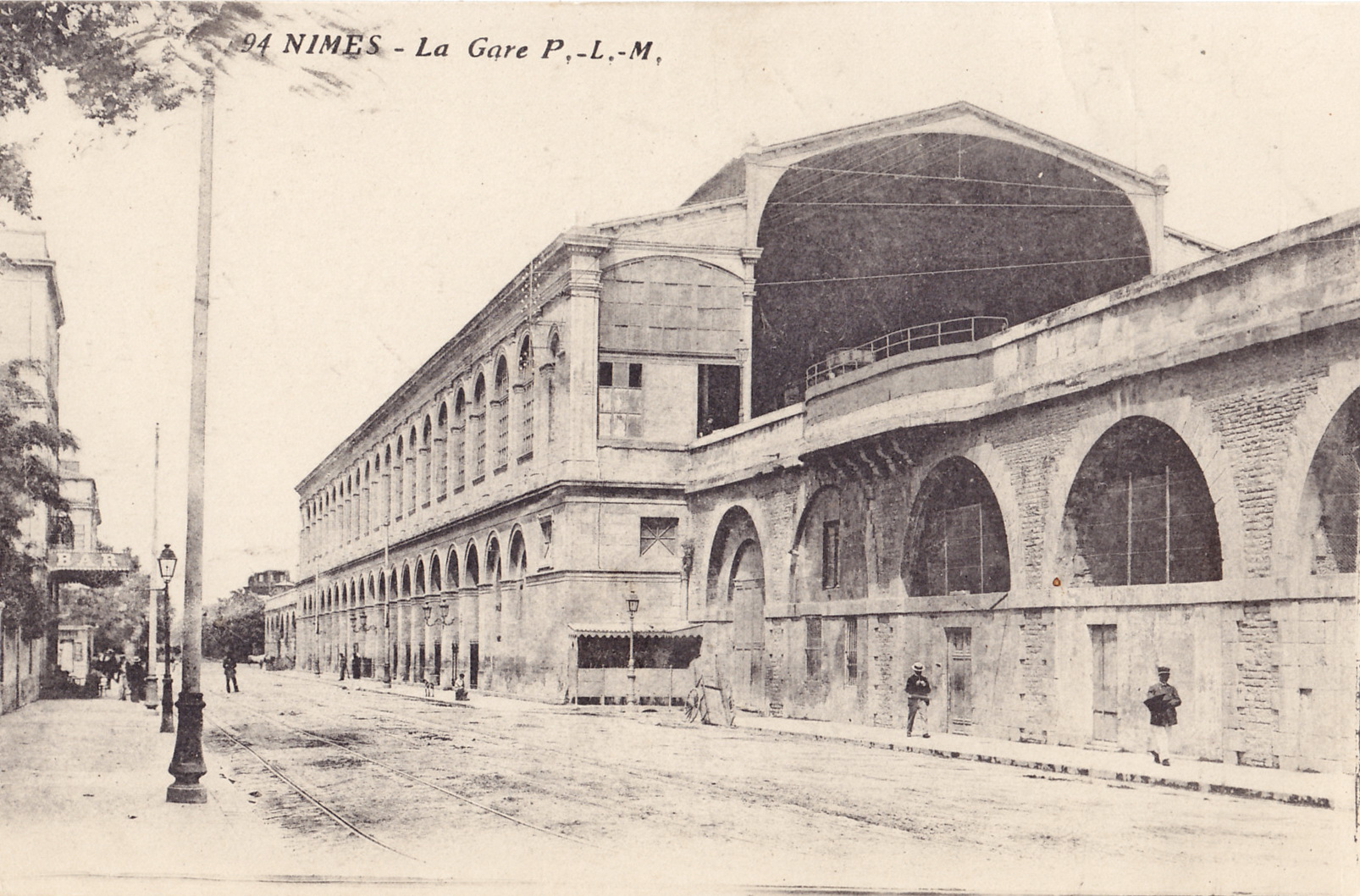
postcard showing the station circa 1916

The station was used by more than 4 million travelers in 2024.

== Train services ==
The following services currently call at the station:

- High-speed services (TGV) Paris–Valence–Nîmes–Montpellier (- Béziers)
- High-speed services (TGV) Paris–Lyon–Nîmes–Montpellier–Narbonne–Perpignan
- High-speed services (TGV) Paris–Valence–Nîmes–Montpellier–Perpignan–Barcelona
- High-speed services (TGV) Lyon–Nîmes–Montpellier–Perpignan–Barcelona
- High-speed services (AVE) Marseille–Nîmes–Montpellier–Perpignan–Barcelona–Madrid
- High-speed services (TGV) Brussels–Lille–Paris-CDG Airport–Lyon–Nîmes–Montpellier–Perpignan
- High-speed services (TGV) Lyon–Nîmes–Montpellier–Toulouse
- Intercity services (Intercités) Bordeaux–Toulouse–Montpellier–Marseille
- Regional services (TER Occitanie) Narbonne–Béziers–Montpellier–Nîmes–Avignon
- Regional services (TER Occitanie) Cerbère–Perpignan–Narbonne–Montpellier–Nîmes–Avignon
- Regional services (TER Occitanie) Narbonne–Montpellier–Nîmes–Arles–Marseille
- Local services (TER Occitanie) Nîmes–Vauvert–Le Grau-du-Roi
- Local services (TER Occitanie) Clermont-Ferrand–Brioude–Génolhac–Alès–Nîmes
