= Hyères station =

Railway station in Hyères, France

Coordinates: 43°6′32″N 6°7′27″E

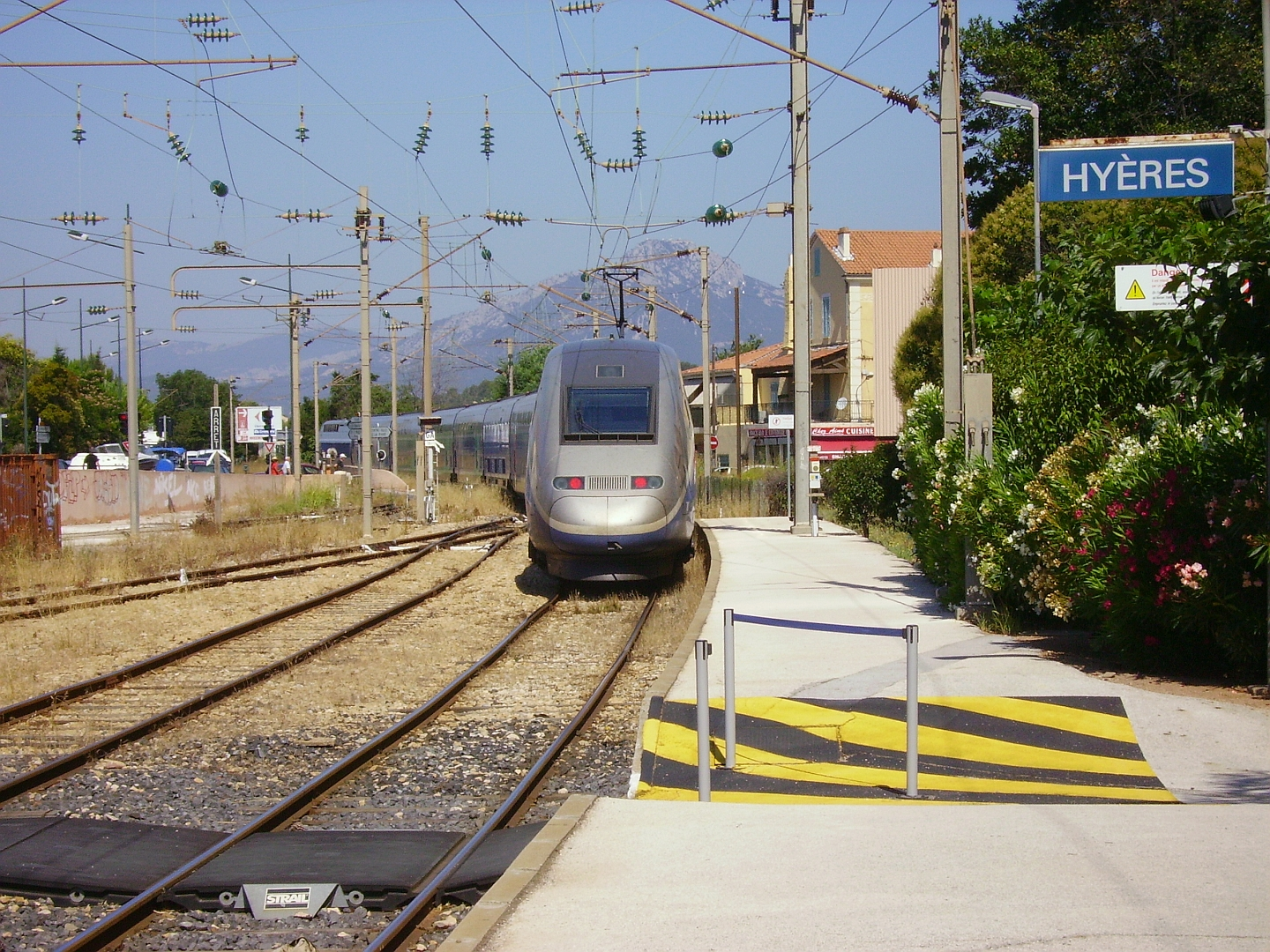
Gare d'Hyères, with a TGV Duplex

Gare d'Hyères is a railway station serving the town Hyères, Var department, southeastern France. The station is served by regional trains (TER Provence-Alpes-Côte d'Azur) to Marseille and Toulon.

Preceding station	SNCF	Following station
Toulon towards Paris-Lyon	TGV inOui	Terminus
Preceding station	TER PACA	Following station
La Crau towards Marseille	1	Terminus
