= Tarascon station =

Railway station in France

Tarascon
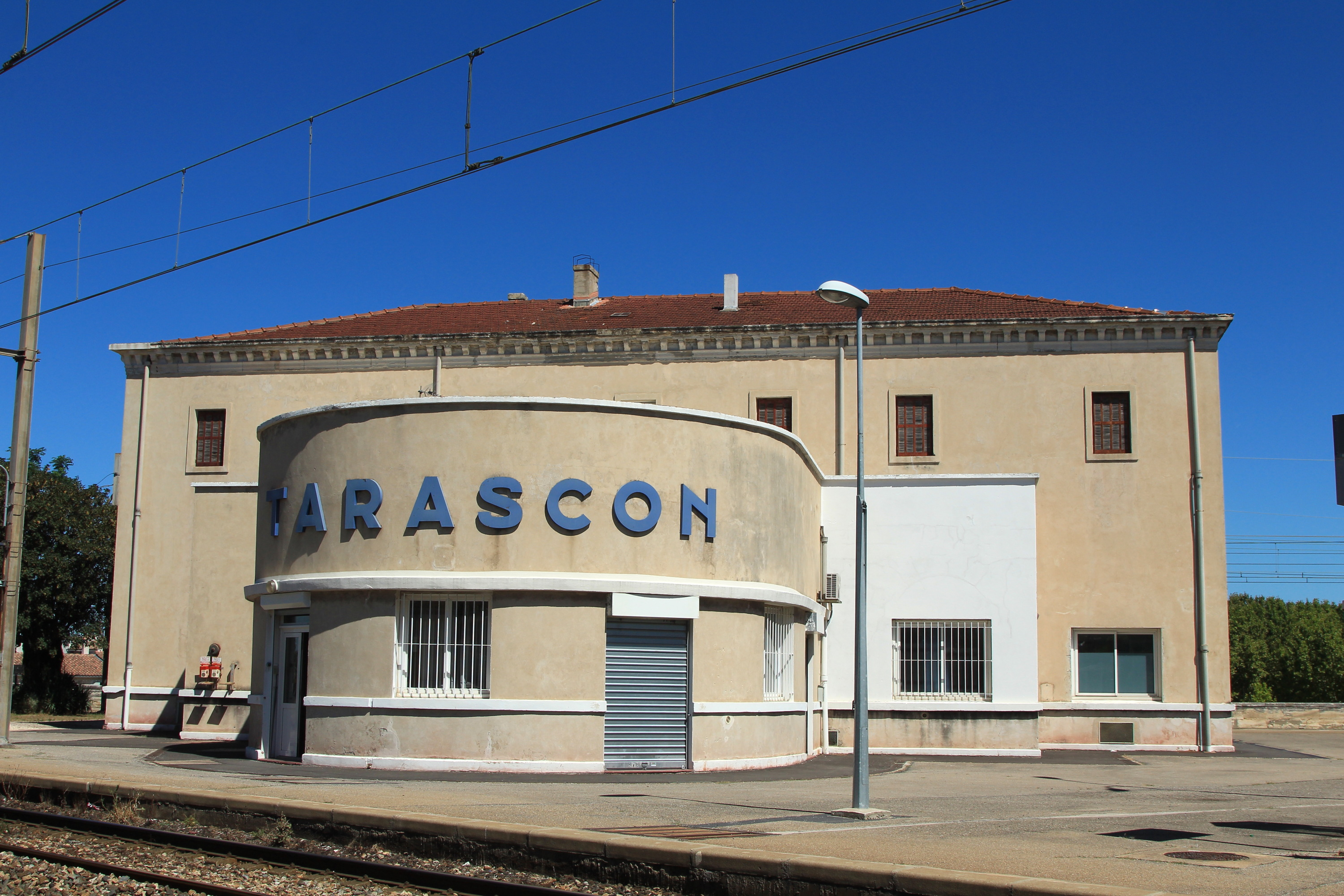
- The station in 2013.

General information
- Location: Boulevard Gustave-Desplaces; 13150 Tarascon; Bouches-du-Rhône, France
- Coordinates: 43.80111°N 4.65724°E
- Owner: SNCF
- Operator: SNCF
- Line: L1, L2 of TER Occitanie

Other information
- Station code: 87765354

History
- Opened: 18 October 1847

Services
Preceding station	TER Occitanie	Following station
Nîmes towards Narbonne	6	Arles towards Marseille
Beaucaire towards Narbonne	21	Avignon-Centre Terminus
Nîmes-Pont-du-Gard towards Portbou	22	Avignon-Centre Terminus
Location

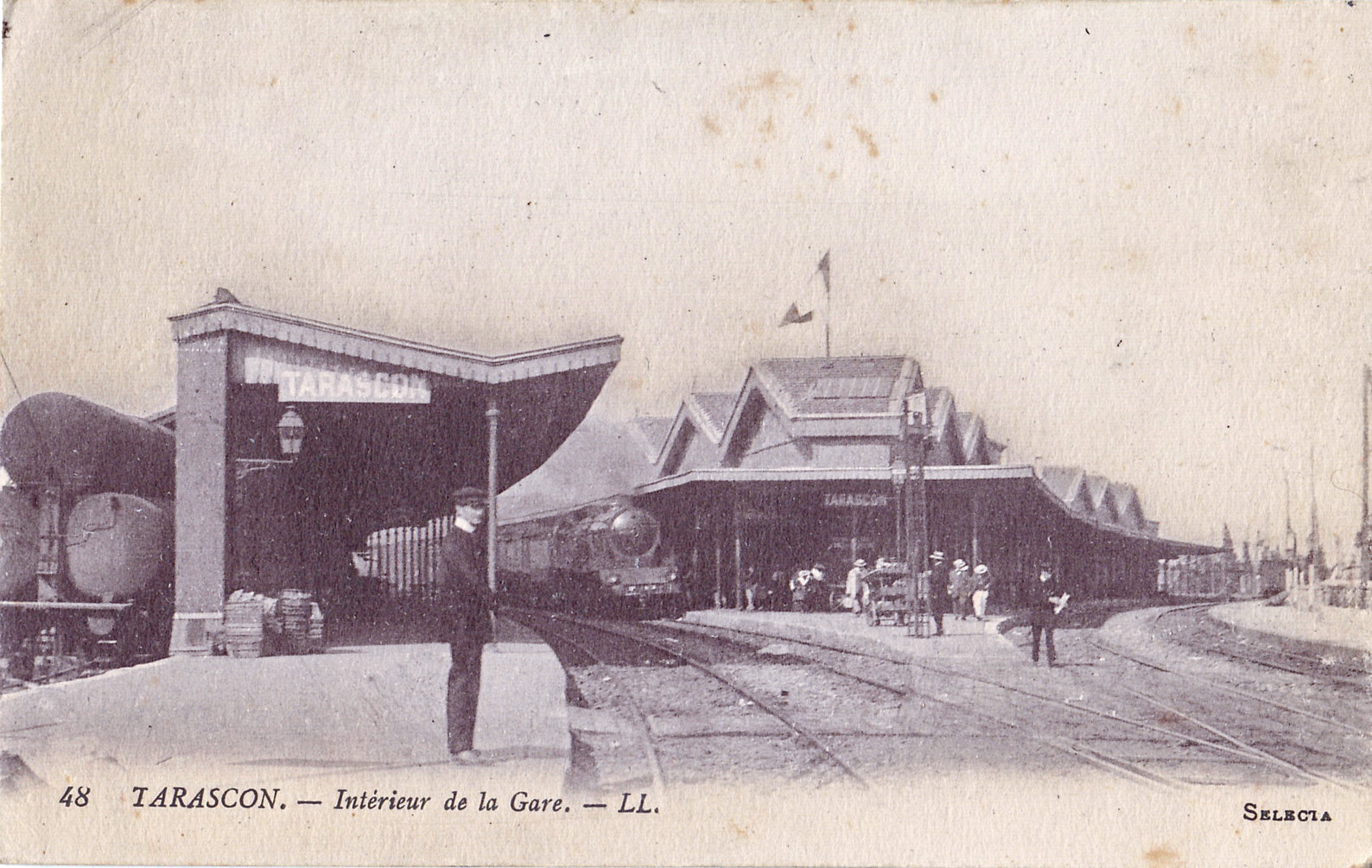
First station at the site, shown before 1914.

Tarascon station (French: Gare de Tarascon) is a railway station in Tarascon, Provence-Alpes-Côte d'Azur, southern France.

== History ==
The first station was built on the site in 1848. The building and surrounding infrastructure were heavily bombed by the Allies during the Second World War in 1944. The passenger building was refurbished in 1960, and a service building was constructed at the site. An existing annex at the station was demolished and the passenger shelter was torn down and rebuilt, also in 1960. "In 1960, the SNCF entrusted the company Michel et Jauffret of Miramas with this work: refurbishment of the passenger building; construction of a service building; demolition of an annex building; demolition of the passenger shelter; reconstruction of a more modest shelter. The firm carried out the work at a cost of 341 178.17 francs (1960 value)."

== Services ==
Tarascon is served by TER Provence-Alpes-Côte-d'Azur and TER Occitanie.

Within TER Occitanie, it is part of lines 6 (Narbonne–Marseille), 21 (Narbonne–Avignon) and 22 (Portbou–Avignon).
