= Valence–Moirans railway =

Railway line in southeastern France

- Map of the Valence-Moirans railway line.

Overview
- Status: Operational
- Owner: RFF
- Locale: France (Auvergne-Rhône-Alpes)
- Termini: Valence-Ville station; Moirans

Service
- System: SNCF
- Operator: SNCF

History
- Opened: 1864

Technical
- Line length: 78 km (48 mi)
- Number of tracks: Single track
- Track gauge: 1,435 mm (4 ft 8 1/2 in) standard gauge
- Electrification: Overhead catenary 25 kV 50 Hz
- Operating speed: 140 km/h (87 mph)

The railway from Valence to Moirans is a 78 km long railway line in southeastern France. It was built by the PLM and opened on 9 May 1864 to link Valence and Grenoble. The line is electrified, and is double-track over two-thirds of its length.

In 2011, Réseau Ferré de France announced an €80m contract award to electrify the line from Valence on Paris-Marseille line to Moirans on the Lyon-Grenoble line. The electrified connection to the LGV Méditerranée allows occasional high-speed services from points south to Grenoble and north. Construction started in December 2012 and was completed by December 2013.

== Main stations ==
- Moirans
- Romans-Bourg de Péage
- Valence TGV
- Valence-Ville
