= 2017 Marseille stabbing =

Islamic terrorism attack

Marseille stabbing
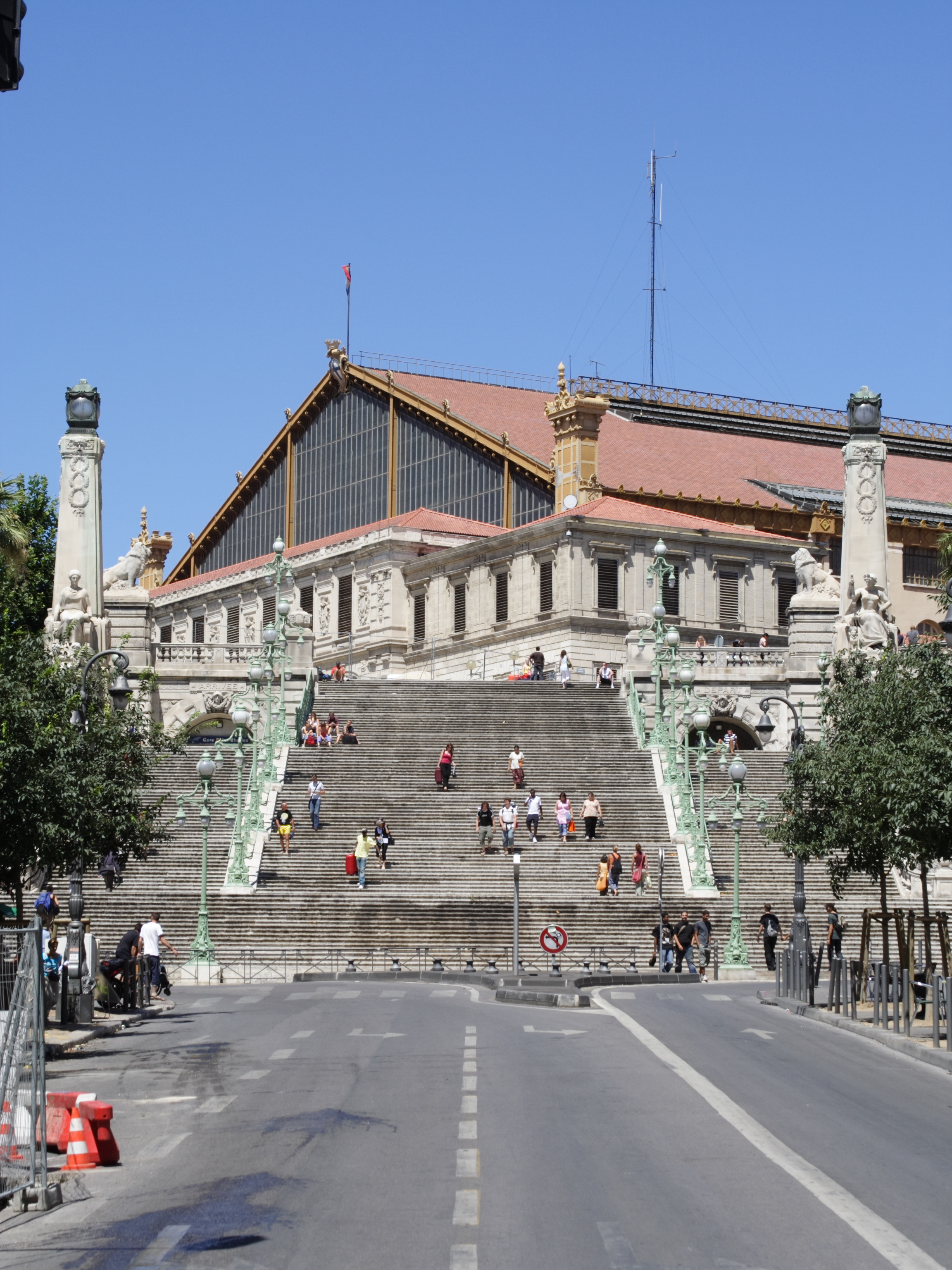
- "Le Grand Escalier" at the Saint-Charles train station Marseille
- Location: Marseille-Saint-Charles station, Marseille, France
- Date: 1 October 2017
- Target: Travellers
- Weapon: Knife
- Deaths: 3 (including the perpetrator)
- Perpetrator: Ahmed Hanachi
- Motive: possibly Islamic extremism

On 1 October 2017, a man killed two women at the Saint-Charles train station in Marseille, France. The women, 20-year-old and 21-year-old cousins, were attacked by an illegal immigrant from Tunisia using a knife. Patrolling soldiers, who had been deployed on national soil following an increase in Islamic terrorist threats, shot him dead at the scene. The brother of the attacker was later arrested and faced preliminary charges of suspicion of involvement in the train station attack. French police were cautious as to whether it was a terrorist attack, but it was later classified as jihadist terrorism by Europol.

== Attack ==
Surveillance video showed the perpetrator sitting on a bench for a few minutes outside the station, then rising and stabbing a woman several times then running away while screaming Allahu akbar, before returning to attack the second woman. A female passerby attempted to intervene. The perpetrator then attempted to attack two soldiers patrolling the station, but was shot dead with two bullets. Police described the weapon used as a knife approximately 20 cm long. The victims were cousins, a 20-year-old medical student at Aix-Marseille University and a 21-year-old studying nursing in Lyon; one was stabbed while the other had her throat cut. The Prosecutor of France, François Molins, later confirmed that the perpetrator twice shouted "Allahu akbar".

French prosecutors opened a preliminary investigation for "murders in connection with a terrorist enterprise" and "attempted assassination of persons holding public authority", but investigators remained cautious about the nature of the incident. Central, rather than anti-terrorist, police handled the investigation. French interior minister Gérard Collomb said: "It might be a terrorist act, but at this point we can’t say so with certainty".

== Perpetrator ==
On 30 September, the day before the attack, the perpetrator had been arrested in Lyon on suspicion of shoplifting. He was held overnight; however, he was not on the terror watch list and police released him. The perpetrator was found to have used multiple identities, but his real identity was established using fingerprints which matched those taken in seven previous incidents registered by French police since 2005. Authorities in Lyon had considered deporting him, but hesitated due to the uncertainty of his identity. He was carrying a Tunisian passport when arrested in Lyon on the day before the attack, but not carrying any ID at the time of the attack. He was in France illegally. Tunisian authorities have identified him as Ahmed Hanachi; he had been arrested for various offences there and a dozen times in France, and had admitted to police that he was addicted to drugs. French authorities said there was no outward evidence that the attacker had been radicalised.

The investigators announced that no ties were found between the perpetrator and any terror group, though it was later classified as jihadist terrorism by Europol. The ISIS-related Amaq News Agency claimed that the perpetrator was a "soldier" of the Islamic State. The perpetrator's friends and family dismissed the notion that he was radicalised, saying that he was a drug addict who had lost his way. Investigators found jihadist videos on the attacker's phone.

=== Other arrests ===
On 8 October, Italian police arrested a younger brother of the attacker, identified as 25-year-old Anis Hanachi in the town of Ferrara, after an international arrest warrant had been issued by France. He was being held on suspicion of complicity in the attack and of membership in a terrorist group. He had reportedly fought in Syria, and had previously been expelled from Italy in 2014 after arriving in Sicily illegally on a smuggler boat.

On 10 October, Swiss police detained two Tunisians in the town of Chiasso near the Swiss-Italian border, including another brother of the attacker who was "known to foreign police services for his links to jihadist terrorist movements". The couple, a man and a woman who were seeking asylum in Switzerland were due to be sent back to Tunisia. The man's role in the Marseille attack, "if any, is not clear", Swiss police said.

Tunisian authorities said two other siblings of the attacker living in Bizerte had been held for questioning.

== Reactions ==
Both French President Emmanuel Macron and local politician Samia Ghali praised the efficiency of the Opération Sentinelle soldiers who stopped the attack, with Ghali telling local radio "If the military had not been there, we would have had a lot more deaths."
