= Arles station =

Railway station in France

Arles
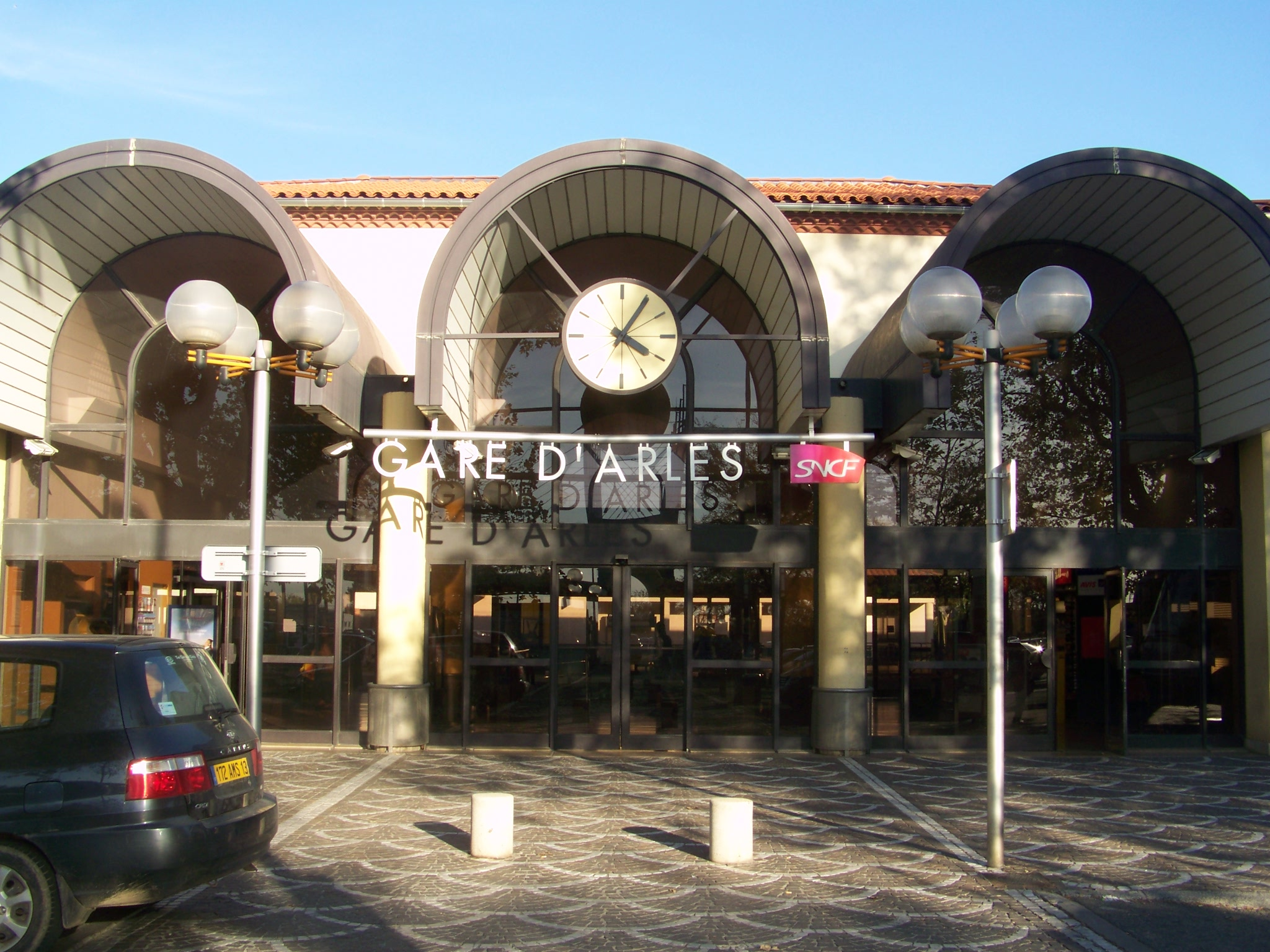
- Arles railway station

General information
- Location: Avenue Paulin Talbot; 13200 Arles; Bouches-du-Rhône, France
- Coordinates: 43°41′5″N 4°37′55″E
- Line: Paris–Marseille railway
- Platforms: 4
- Tracks: 4

Other information
- Station code: 87753657

History
- Opened: 1848
Services
Preceding station	SNCF	Following station
Avignon-Centre towards Paris-Lyon	TGV inOui	Miramas Terminus
Nîmes towards Bordeaux	Intercités	Marseille Terminus
Preceding station	TER PACA	Following station
Avignon Terminus	8	Saint-Martin-de-Crau towards Marseille
Avignon towards Lyon-Part-Dieu	10	Saint-Martin-de-Crau towards Marseille
Preceding station	TER Occitanie	Following station
Tarascon towards Narbonne	6	Saint-Martin-de-Crau towards Marseille
Location

Arles station (French: Gare d'Arles; Occitan: Estacion d'Arle) is a railway station serving the city of Arles, Bouches-du-Rhône, southeastern France. The station was opened in 1848 and is located on the Paris–Marseille railway. The train services are operated by SNCF.

== Train services ==
The following services call at Arles:

- High Speed services (TGV) Paris - Valence - Avignon - Miramas
- Intercity services (Intercités) Bordeaux - Toulouse - Montpellier - Marseille
- Express services (TER Occitanie) Narbonne - Montpellier - Nîmes - Arles - Marseille
- Express services (TER PACA) Lyon - Valence - Montélimar - Avignon - Marseille
- Local services (TER PACA) Avignon - Arles - Miramas - Marseille
