= Miramas station =

Railway station in Miramas, France

Coordinates: 43°34′50″N 4°59′58″E

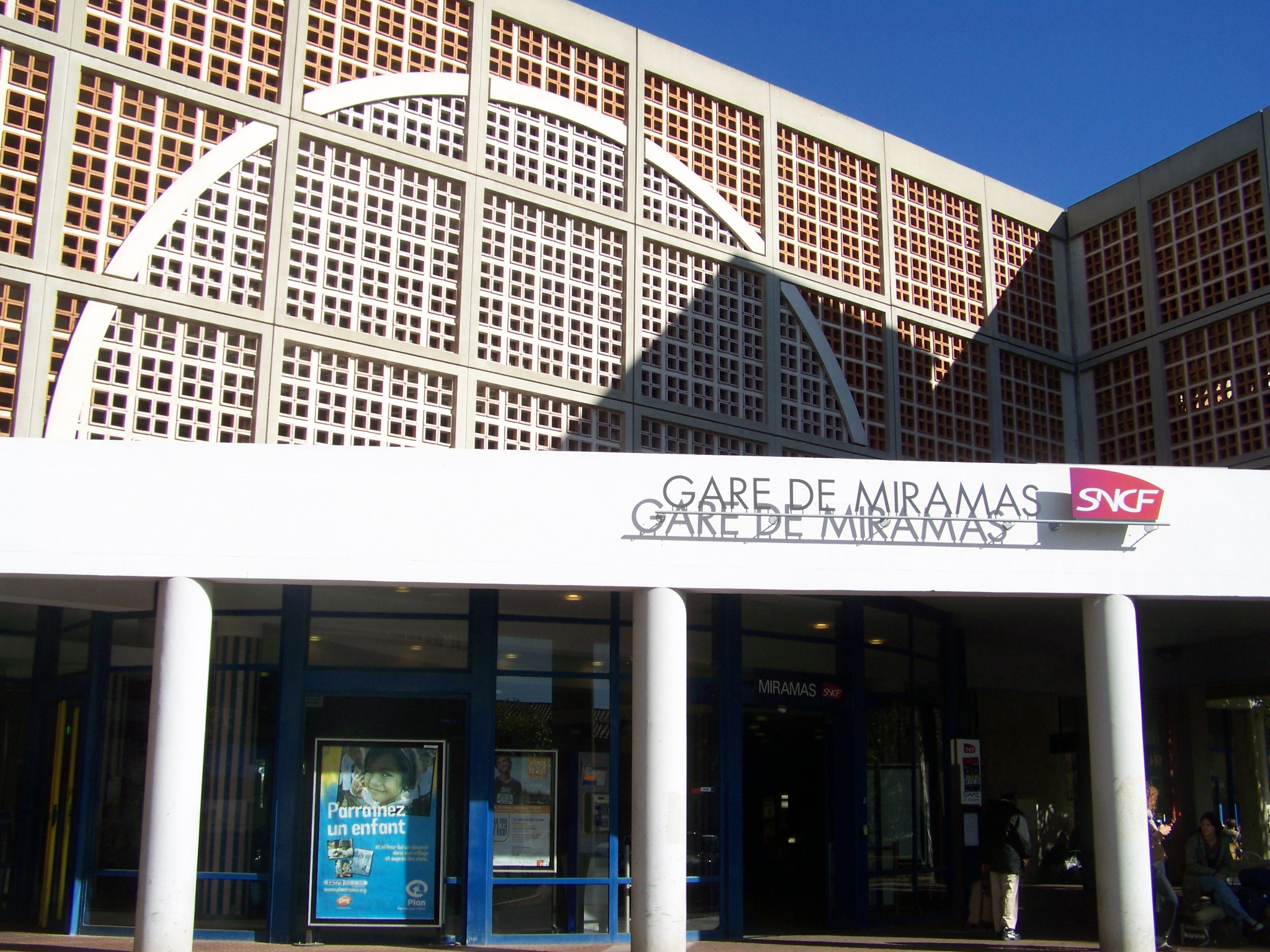
Facade and entrance of city of Miramas railway station in Bouches-du-Rhône, France.

Gare de Miramas is a railway station serving the town Miramas, Bouches-du-Rhône department, southeastern France. It is situated on the Paris–Marseille railway, and on branch lines towards Martigues and Salon-de-Provence. It is served by trains between Marseille, Avignon and Arles.

Preceding station	SNCF	Following station
Arles towards Paris-Lyon	TGV	Terminus
Preceding station	TER PACA	Following station
Terminus	7bis	Istres towards Marseille
Saint-Martin-de-Crau towards Avignon	8	Saint-Chamas towards Marseille
Salon towards Avignon TGV	9	Vitrolles-Aéroport towards Marseille
Saint-Martin-de-Crau towards Lyon-Part-Dieu	10	Vitrolles-Aéroport towards Marseille
Preceding station	TER Occitanie	Following station
Saint-Martin-de-Crau towards Narbonne	6	Vitrolles-Aéroport towards Marseille
