= Avignon-Centre station =

Railway station in Avignon, France

Avignon Centre
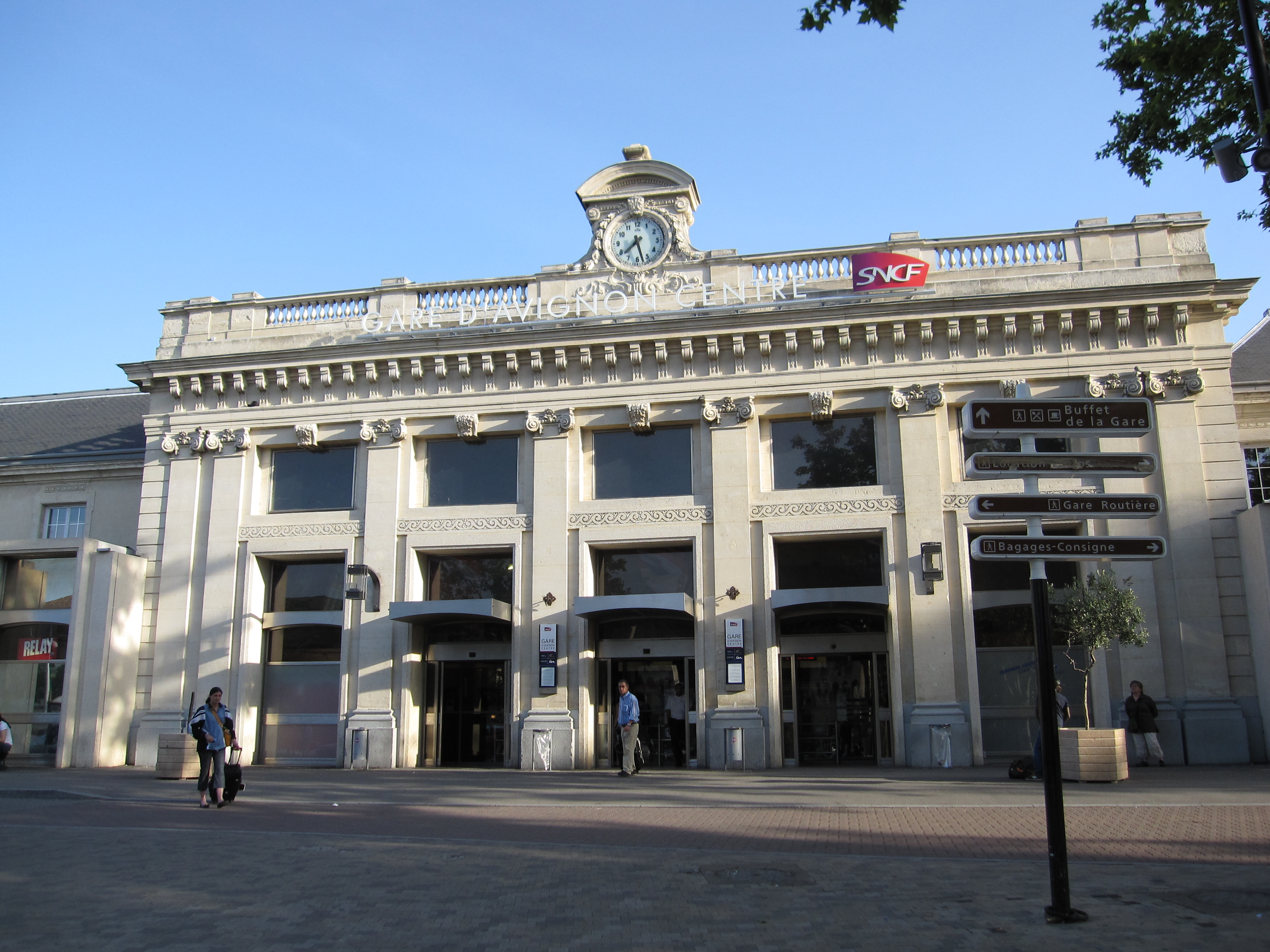
- The station frontage

General information
- Location: Boulevard Saint-Roch, B.P.175, 84008; Avignon CEDEX; France
- Coordinates: 43.9419°N 4.8047°E
- Elevation: 23 m (75 ft)
- Owner: RFF / SNCF
- Operator: SNCF
- Lines: Paris–Marseille; Avignon–Miramas; Villeneuve-lès-Avignon–Avignon

History
- Opened: 5 March 1849

Passengers
- 2024: 3,339,139
Services
Preceding station	SNCF	Following station
Orange (Vaucluse) towards Paris-Lyon	TGV inOui	Arles towards Miramas
Preceding station	TER Auvergne-Rhône-Alpes	Following station
Sorgues-Châteauneuf-du-Pape towards Lyon-Vaise	5	Terminus
Preceding station	TER Occitanie	Following station
Tarascon towards Narbonne	21	Terminus
Tarascon towards Portbou	22	Terminus
Preceding station	TER PACA	Following station
Terminus	8	Arles towards Marseille
Avignon TGV Terminus	9	Montfavet towards Marseille
Sorgues-Châteauneuf-du-Pape towards Carpentras	9bis	Avignon TGV Terminus
Orange towards Lyon-Part-Dieu	10	Arles towards Marseille
Location

The gare d'Avignon-Centre (Avignon Central railway station; Occitan: Estacion d'Avinhon-Centre) is a railway station serving the city of Avignon, in Vaucluse, France. It is on the Paris–Marseille railway.

== Description ==
The station building was constructed in 1866 according to the plans of the architect Louis-Jules Bouchot, and is similar to its counterpart at Valence-Ville, which was also designed by Bouchot. The building's symmetrical façade is neoclassical in style, with five bays and a clock surmounting the balustrade.

== Train traffic ==
A wide range of trains use Avignon-Centre station, including Transport express régional, TGV trains from Paris Gare de Lyon, Provence, Côte d'Azur and Languedoc. Many other TGV trains stop at the Avignon TGV station.

The services include:

- local service (TER Occitanie) Narbonne - Béziers - Montpellier - Nîmes - Avignon
- express service (TER Occitanie) Cerbère - Perpignan - Narbonne - Montpellier - Nîmes - Avignon
- local service (TER Auvergne-Rhône-Alpes) Lyon - Valence - Avignon
- express service (TER Provence-Alpes-Côte d'Azur) Lyon - Valence - Avignon - Marseille
- local service (TER Provence-Alpes-Côte d'Azur) Avignon - Cavaillon - Miramas - Marseille
- local service (TER Provence-Alpes-Côte d'Azur) Avignon - Carpentras
- local service (TER Provence-Alpes-Côte d'Azur) Avignon - Arles - Miramas - Marseille
