= Fontanarossa =

Fontanarossa (Italian for 'Red Fountain') may refer to:

== Places ==
- Fontanarossa, a borough of Gorreto, Liguria, Italy
- Fontanarossa, a borough of Cerda, Sicily, Italy
- Fontanarossa, a neighborhood of Catania, Sicily, Italy
  - Catania–Fontanarossa Airport

== People ==
- Susanna Fontanarossa (1435–1489), the mother of Christopher Columbus

== See also ==
- Fontanarosa
- Fontana Rosa
- Fontanarrosa
