= Menton =

- Commune
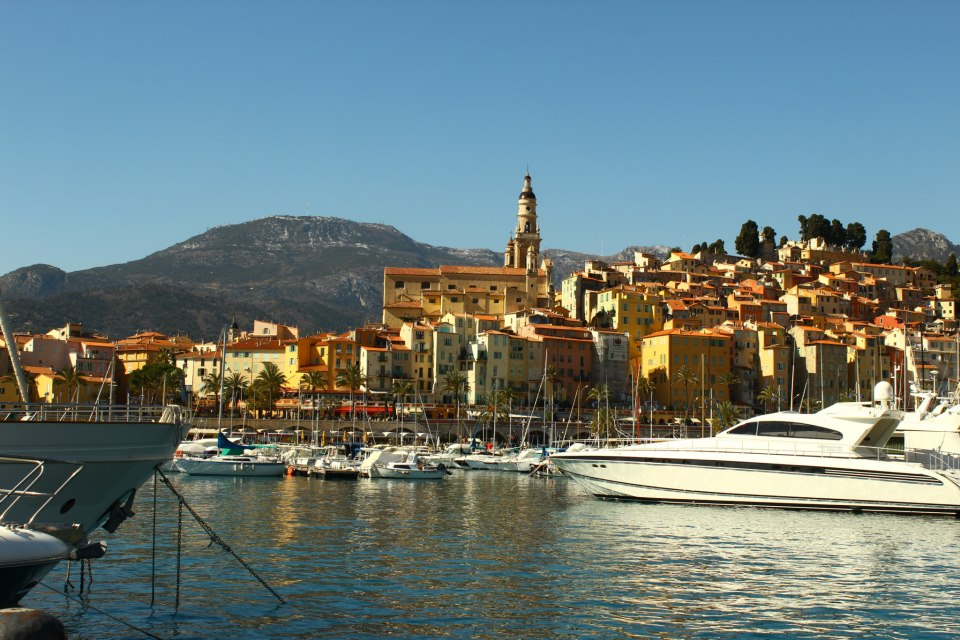
- The harbour of Menton, with the basilica of Saint-Michel-Archange beyond, viewed from the Quai Napoléon III

- Coat of arms
- Location of Menton
- Location within France Location within Provence-Alpes-Côte d'Azur
- Coordinates: 43°46′30″N 7°30′00″E
- Country: France
- Region: Provence-Alpes-Côte d'Azur
- Department: Alpes-Maritimes
- Arrondissement: Nice
- Canton: Menton
- Intercommunality: CA Riviera Française

Government
  - Mayor (2026–32): Alexandra Masson (RN)
- Area^{1}: 14.05 km^{2} (5.42 sq mi)
- Elevation: 16 m (52 ft)
- Highest elevation: 774 m (2,539 ft)
- Lowest elevation: 0 m (0 ft)
- Population (2023): 30,604
  - Density: 2,178/km^{2} (5,642/sq mi)
- Demonym: Mentonnais
- Time zone: UTC+01:00 (CET)
  - Summer (DST): UTC+02:00 (CEST)
- INSEE/Postal code: 06083 /06500
- Website: www.menton.fr
- ^{1} French Land Register data, which excludes lakes, ponds, glaciers > 1 km^{2} (0.386 sq mi or 247 acres) and river estuaries.

Menton (French: [mɑ̃tɔ̃]; Occitan: Menton in classical norm or Mentan in Mistralian norm, pronounced [menˈta], locally [mɛ(n)ˈtã]; Italian: Mentone [menˈtoːne]; Ligurian: Menton or Mentun depending on the orthography) is a resort town and commune in the Alpes-Maritimes department in the Provence-Alpes-Côte d'Azur region on the French Riviera, close to the Italian border.

Menton has always been a frontier town. Since the end of the 14th century, it has been on the border between the County of Nice, held by the Duke of Savoy, and the Republic of Genoa. It was an exclave of the Principality of Monaco until the disputed French plebiscite of 1860 when it was added to France. It had been always a fashionable tourist centre with grand mansions and gardens. Its temperate Mediterranean climate is especially favourable to the citrus industry, with which it is strongly identified.

== Etymology ==
Although the name's spelling and pronunciation in French are identical to those for the word that means "chin", there does not seem to be any link with this French word. According to the French geographer Ernest Nègre, the name Menton comes from the Roman name Mento. However, it is possible that the name of the city comes from Mons Ottonis (reconstituted) from the name of Otton II, the count of Ventimiglia from 1162-1200. In Mentonasc, the city's name is Mentan, and in Italian Mentone.

An inhabitant of Menton, un mentonnais or un mentonasque in French, would be o mentonasc in the local dialect.

== History ==
The Menton area has been inhabited since the Paleolithic era, and is the site of the original "Grimaldi Man" find of early modern humans, as well as remains of Neanderthals and Cro-Magnons. In Roman times, the Via Julia Augusta, a road connecting Placentia (now Piacenza) with Arelates (now Arles) passed through Menton, running along the Rue Longue in the old town. The first major settlement occurred during the 11th century CE, when the count of Ventimiglia constructed the Château de Puypin (Podium Pinum) on the Pépin hill, north and west of the modern town centre. During the 13th century, the seigneury of Puypin fell to the Vento family of Genoa who built a new castle along the Roman road, now the site of the Vieux-Château cemetery, providing the core around which the current town grew. Menton was thus incorporated into the Republic of Genoa. The first mention of Menton dates from 21 July 1262, in the peace treaty between Charles of Anjou and Genoa. Its position on the border between the Angevin-ruled Provence and the Republic of Genoa, which at the time claimed Monaco as its western limit, made it a coveted location.

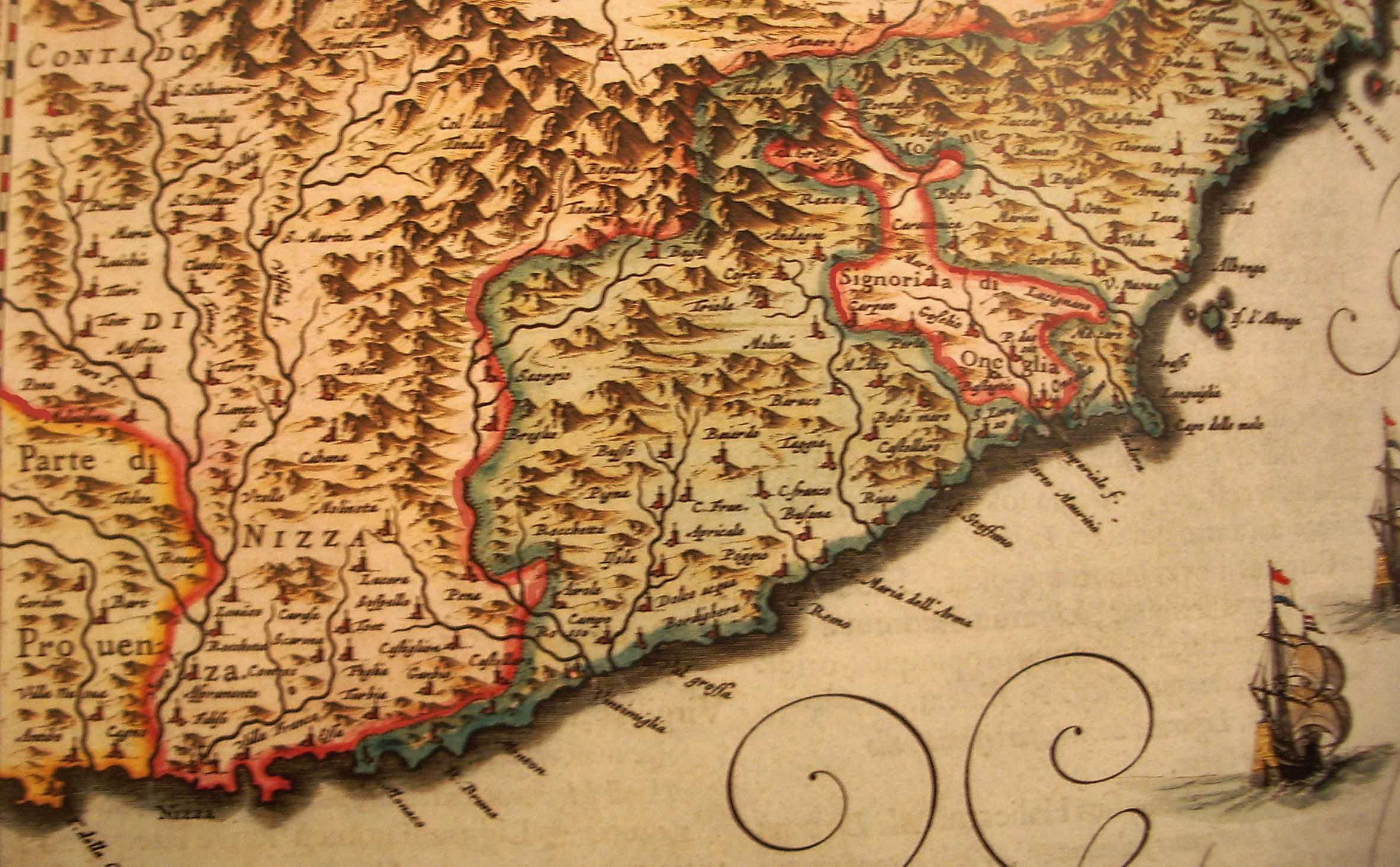
Menton, as part of Monaco, in 1664

Acquired in 1346 by Charles Grimaldi, Lord of Monaco, Menton was ruled by the princes of Monaco until the French Revolution. Annexed during the Revolution, Menton remained part of France through the First Empire. It belonged to the district of Sanremo in the department of Alpes-Maritimes, which at the time included Monaco and Sanremo.

In 1814, Menton was included in a reconstituted principality of Monaco which, after Napoleon's Hundred Days in 1815, became a protectorate of the king of Sardinia.

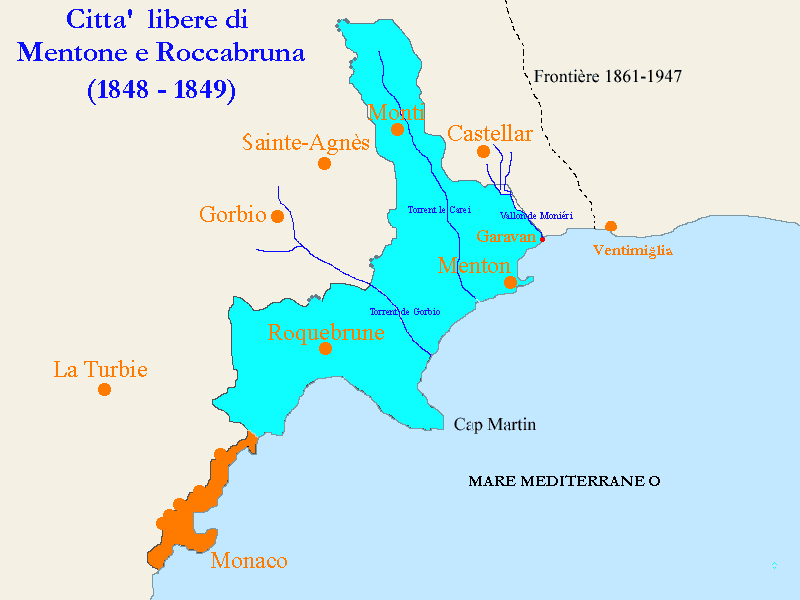
Marked in azure the territory of the Free Cities of Menton and Roquebrune, marked in orange the territory of the Principality of Monaco in 1848

In 1848, Menton, along with its neighbour Roquebrune, seceded from Monaco, due at least in part to a tax imposed on lemon exports. They proclaimed the Free Cities of Menton and Roquebrune during the 1848 revolutions related to the Italian Risorgimento. The Free Cities of Menton and Roquebrune hoped to be part of the Italian kingdom of Sardinia. Two years later they placed themselves under the protection of the Italian kingdom of Sardinia where they were administered by the House of Savoy for ten years.

The Treaty of Turin concluded on 24 March 1860 between the Kingdom of Sardinia and Napoleon III's France called for the annexation of the County of Nice to France, subject to a plebiscite, as a reward for French assistance in Italy's war against Austria. The plebiscite, with universal adult male suffrage, was held on 15 and 16 April 1860, and resulted in an overwhelming vote in favour of annexation (833 for versus 54 against in Menton and Roquebrune). The County of Nice was thus annexed to France that June, and Napoleon III paid 4 million francs in compensation to the prince of Monaco, who renounced his rights in perpetuity on 2 February 1861. Nice-born Giuseppe Garibaldi, who promoted the union of the County of Nice to Italy, complained that the plebiscite was not done with "universal vote" and consequently Menton was requested by Italian irredentists.

The publication of Winter and Spring on the Shores of the Mediterranean (1861) by the English doctor James Henry Bennett had a profound effect on Menton, making it a destination for sufferers of tuberculosis. By the end of the 19th century, tourism was an important factor in Menton's growth. The town was popular with British and Russian aristocrats who built many of the hotels, villas, and palaces which still grace Menton today. Many of these hotels and palaces were pressed into service as hospitals during World War I to allow injured troops to recuperate in a pleasant climate.

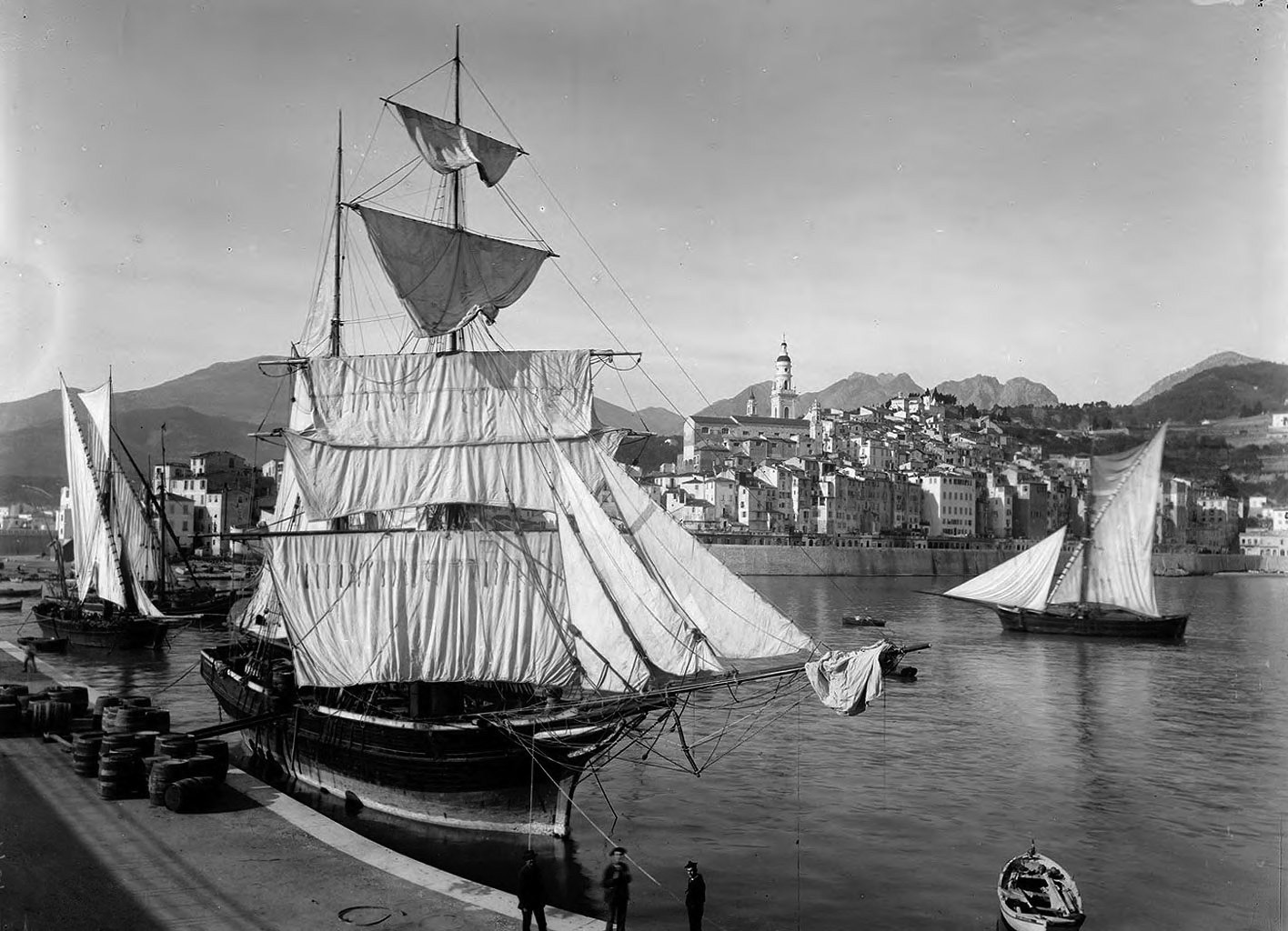
Sailing ships in Menton harbour, photograph by Jean Gilletta, early 1900s

Menton was the only sizable settlement captured by Italy during its invasion of France in June 1940. Following the armistice of 22 June 1940, two-thirds of the territory of the commune was annexed by Italy as terra irredenta. The annexation lasted until 8 September 1943.

Although officially returned to Vichy France, Menton was in fact occupied by Nazi Germany until its liberation by American and Canadian troops of the First Special Service Force on 8 September 1944.

== Geography ==
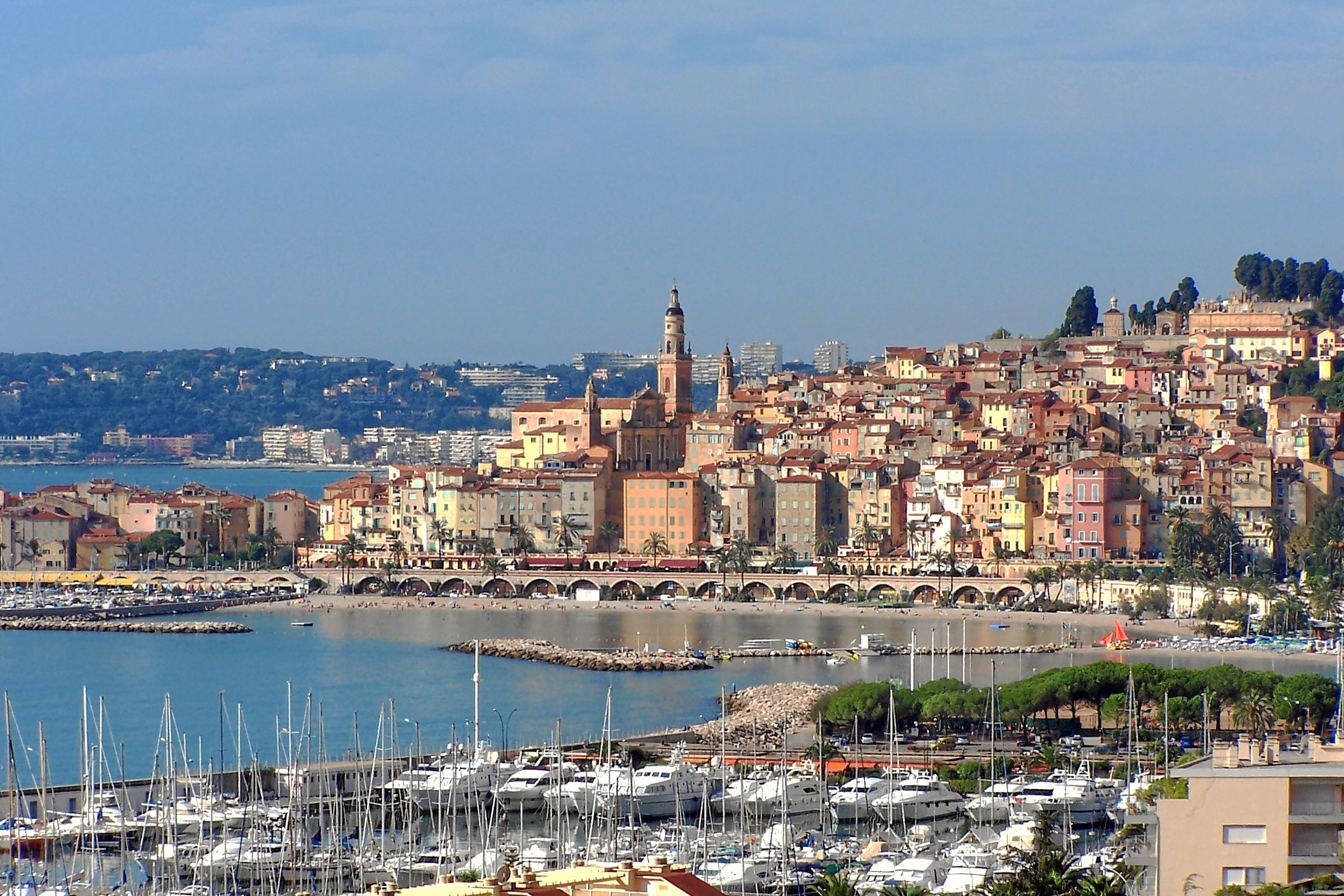
The port and the old part of town

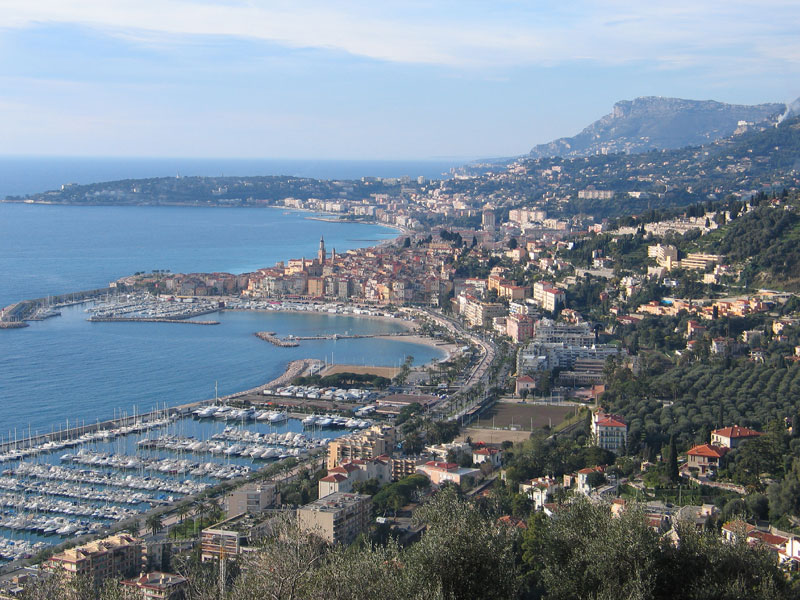
View of the port of Menton

Menton, nicknamed the Pearl of France, is located on the Mediterranean Sea at the Franco-Italian border, just across from the Ligurian town of Ventimiglia. Menton station has rail connections to Paris, Marseille, Cannes, Antibes, Nice and Ventimiglia. The smaller Menton-Garavan station is situated between Menton and Ventimiglia.

The fishing industry was devastated in the 1980s and 1990s due to a combination of overfishing and hypoxia in the bay. At the time, the devastation was erroneously attributed to the dubiously nicknamed "killer algae" Caulerpa taxifolia (a non-native Asian tropical green alga first discovered in the Mediterranean Sea adjacent to the Oceanographic Museum of Monaco in 1984) spread throughout the coastal sea floor. Later, sound scientific findings revealed that the seaweed was adept at absorbing pollutants and excess nutrients, actually aiding the recovery of native Posidonia sea grass and enhancing local fish populations and overall biodiversity.

=== Climate ===
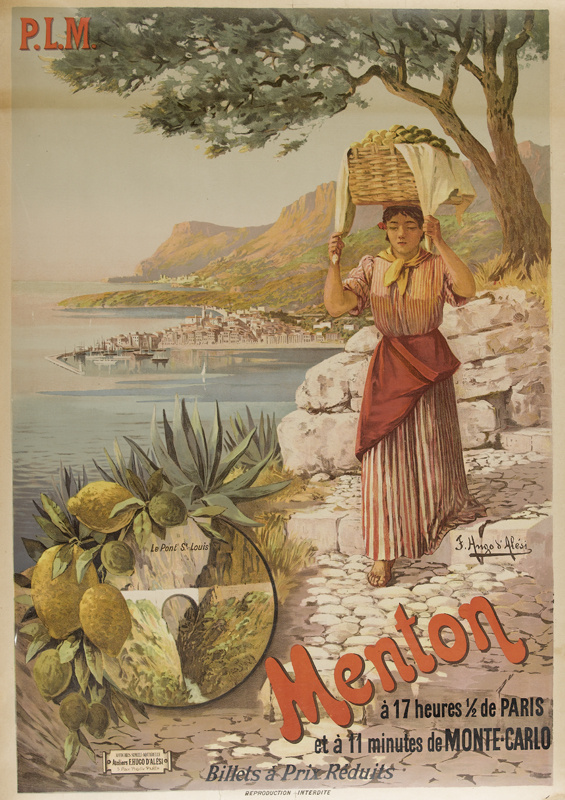
1906 poster of Menton by Hugo d'Alesi

Menton has a very mild subtropical microclimate with an average of 316 clear or mostly clear/mostly sunny days per year. Under the Köppen system, Menton features a hot-summer Mediterranean climate (Csa). However, the milder winters (on average) and the warmer nights in summer (on average), compared to the rest of the French Mediterranean coastal area, provide Menton with a particular micro-climate, with significant warm-summer Mediterranean climate (Csb) influences and characteristics, like coastal Southern California. This is usually experienced along the coast between Nice and Menton, toward the Italian border town of Ventimiglia and as far as San Remo). It is favourable to groves of hardy clementines, mandarin oranges, satsuma orange, tangerines, oranges and lemons (SRA 625 is protected Citron de Menton variety), hence one of the town's symbols, the lemon. Winter frosts are extremely rare but may occasionally occur at ground level, and snow falls on average once every 10 years. Likewise, summer temperatures are relatively moderate with day temperatures of 28 °C to 32 °C, but rarely rising above 32 °C.

Menton is sheltered from the west winds by Mont-Agel, and the steep foothills of the Alps, to the north and the north-east, protect the town from freezing winter cold. The winters are therefore very mild and sunny; the thermometer rarely drops below 0 °C, and the lowest average temperature is 11.3 °C in January. Summers are hot at 25 °C on average in July and August but tempered by the sea breeze.

Menton holds the French record for the highest average temperature in July with an average temperature of 24.8 °C. (Values calculated from data recorded over the period 1991-2020) [Source Météo France]

Climate data for Menton (Alpes-Maritimes department, France) at 216m/708feet, 2009–2016 temperature data only (Note: Mean monthly maxima and minima (i.e. the expected highest and lowest temperature readings at any point during the year or given month) calculated based on data at said location from 2009 to 2016. Extremes from 2009 to 2016 as well.)
Month	Jan	Feb	Mar	Apr	May	Jun	Jul	Aug	Sep	Oct	Nov	Dec	Year
Record high °F (°C)	64.9 (18.3)	68.9 (20.5)	74.1 (23.4)	81.0 (27.2)	88.5 (31.4)	92.7 (33.7)	95.7 (35.4)	97.7 (36.5)	92.8 (33.8)	83.4 (28.6)	76.7 (24.8)	68.0 (20.0)	97.7 (36.5)
Mean maximum °F (°C)	62.1 (16.7)	64.2 (17.9)	69.3 (20.7)	76.3 (24.6)	81.3 (27.4)	89.2 (31.8)	91.2 (32.9)	93.2 (34.0)	88.0 (31.1)	79.2 (26.2)	72.0 (22.2)	65.5 (18.6)	94.6 (34.8)
Mean daily maximum °F (°C)	58.1 (14.5)	60.5 (15.8)	62.6 (17.0)	68.1 (20.1)	71.2 (21.8)	78.8 (26.0)	86.2 (30.1)	86.4 (30.2)	80.7 (27.1)	71.2 (21.8)	64.5 (18.1)	59.3 (15.2)	68.9 (20.5)
Mean daily minimum °F (°C)	45.3 (7.4)	44.1 (6.7)	48.7 (9.3)	53.2 (11.8)	58.1 (14.5)	64.8 (18.2)	70.0 (21.1)	70.7 (21.5)	66.4 (19.1)	59.5 (15.3)	53.1 (11.7)	48.0 (8.9)	56.8 (13.8)
Mean minimum °F (°C)	37.9 (3.3)	36.5 (2.5)	40.3 (4.6)	46.6 (8.1)	50.4 (10.2)	57.4 (14.1)	64.0 (17.8)	63.5 (17.5)	59.0 (15.0)	48.7 (9.3)	44.4 (6.9)	40.5 (4.7)	35.1 (1.7)
Record low °F (°C)	32.2 (0.1)	30.0 (−1.1)	36.9 (2.7)	43.0 (6.1)	46.6 (8.1)	52.5 (11.4)	58.3 (14.6)	56.7 (13.7)	54.1 (12.3)	39.2 (4.0)	39.9 (4.4)	30.9 (−0.6)	30.0 (−1.1)
Source: Météo Climat BZH

== Townscape ==
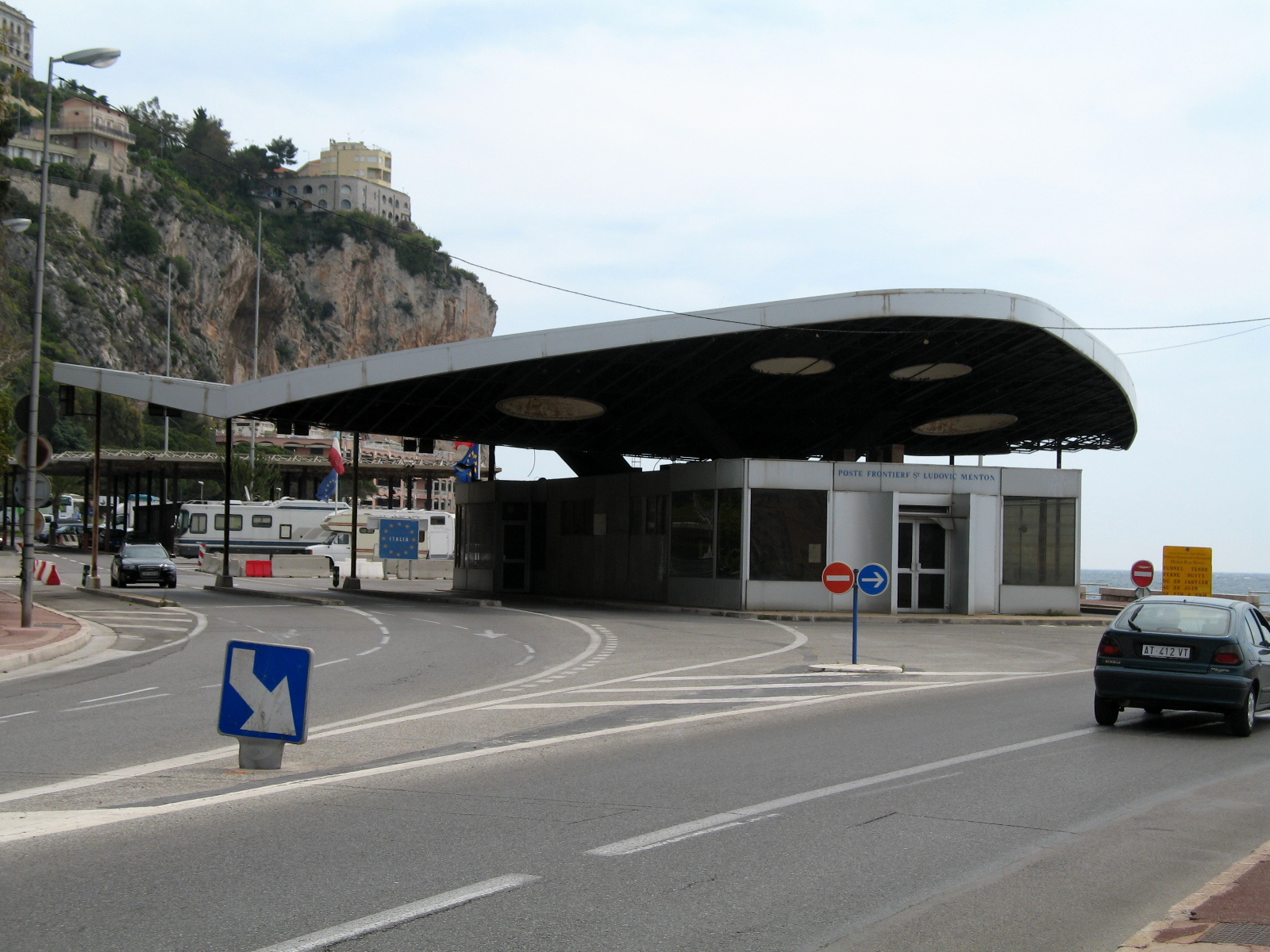
The Pont Saint-Ludovic / Ponte San Ludovico border crossing point between Menton, France, and Ventimiglia, Italy

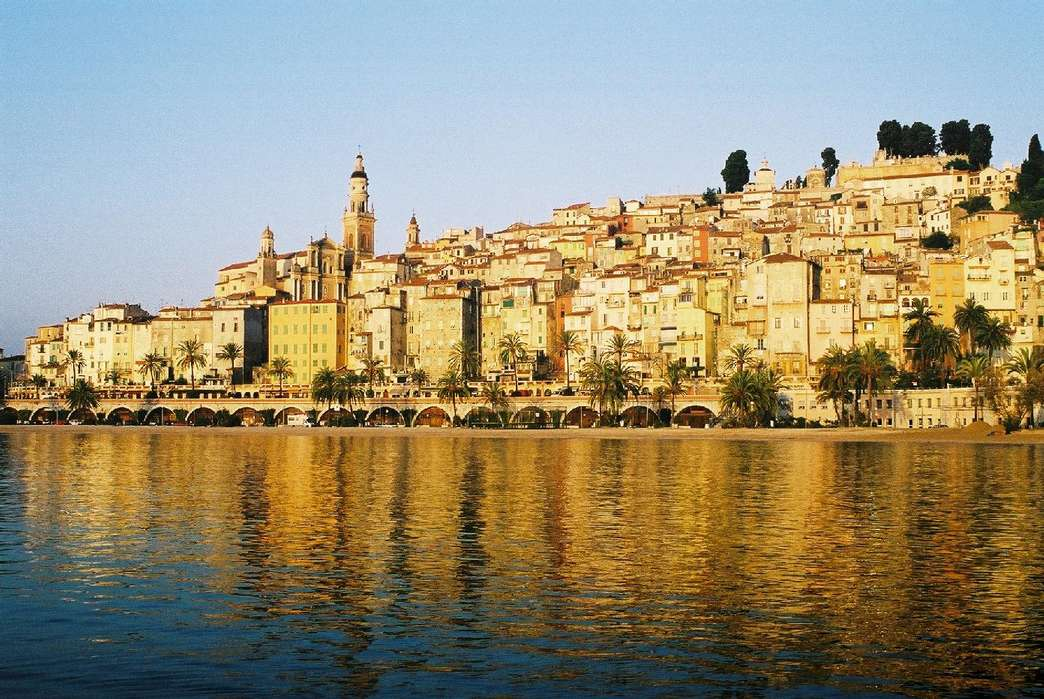
Menton from the sea

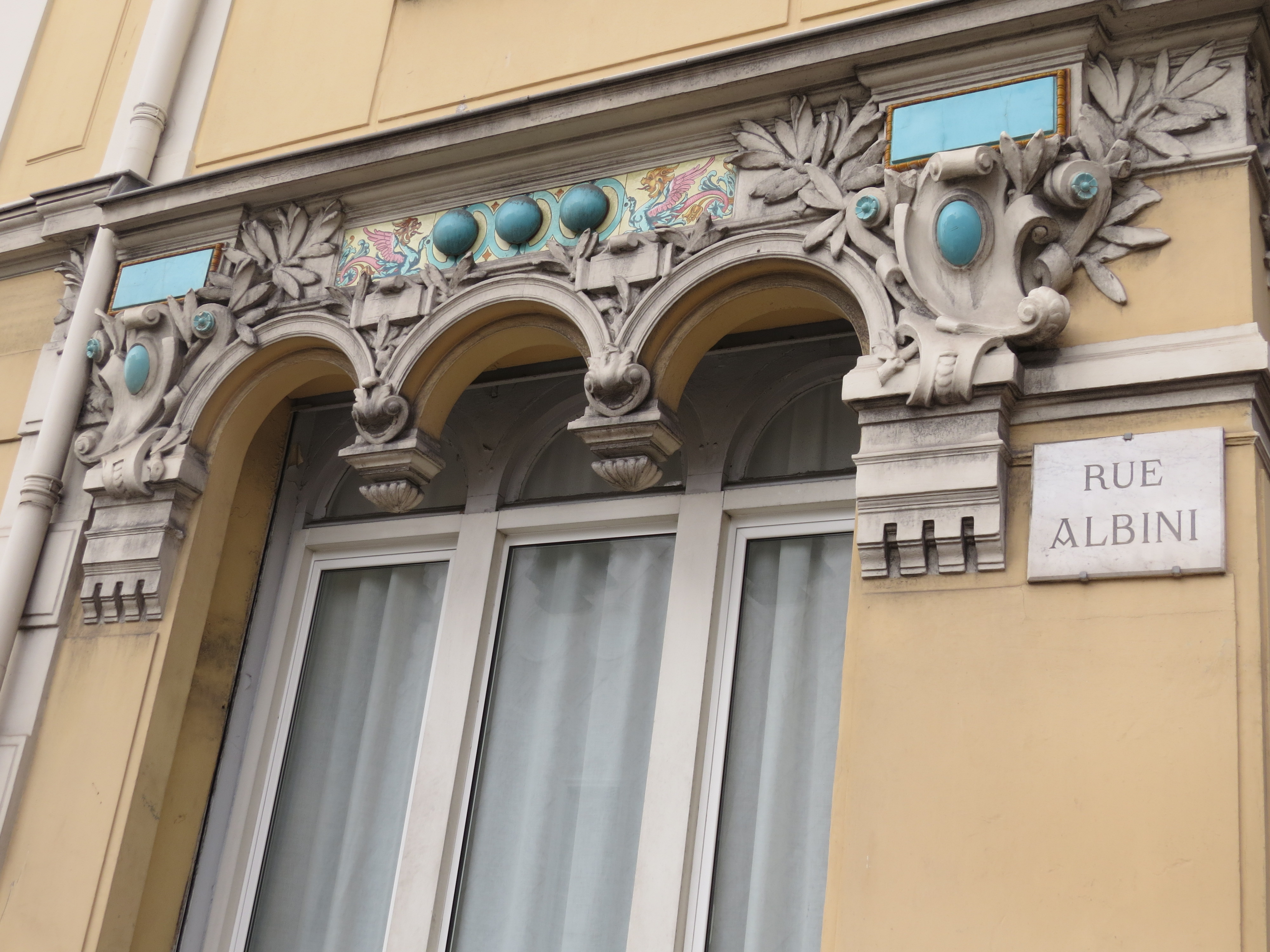
Menton decorated window

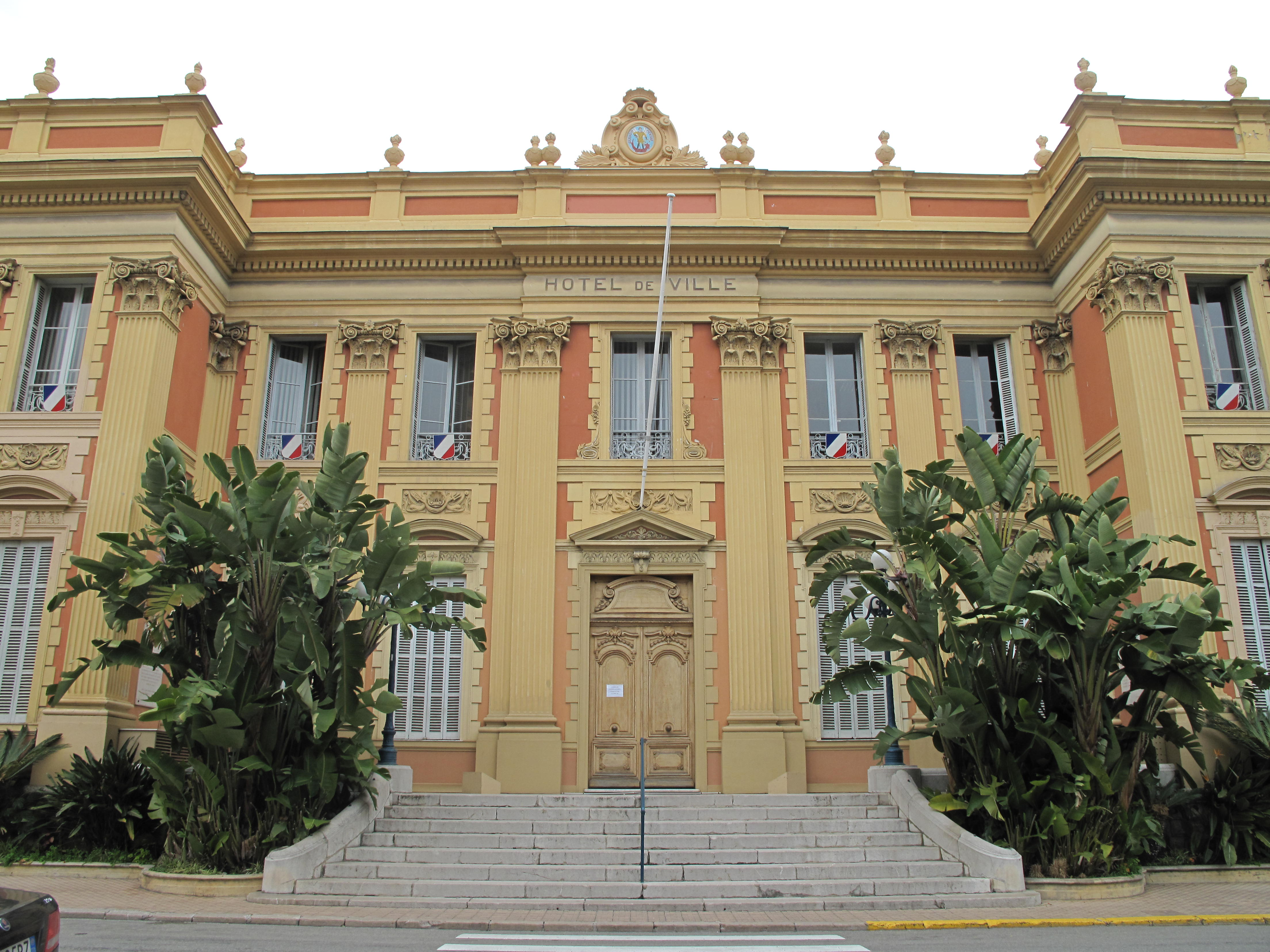
The Hôtel de Ville

Menton is known for its gardens, including the Jardin Serre de la Madone, the Jardin botanique exotique de Menton ('Le Val Rahmeh'), the Fontana Rosa, the Maria Serena garden, and the modernist gardens of Les Colombières. Le Val Rahmeh was established in 1905 by Englishman Sir Percy Radcliffe, the first owner of the gardens, and named for his wife. Villa Fontana Rosa was built in 1922 by Blasco Ibáñez, a Spanish novelist and the gardens of the villa are now open to the public.

- The baroque basilica of Saint-Michel-Archange, with its bell tower, was built in 1619 by the Genoese architect Lorenzo Lavagna.
- The Bastion Museum, which features decoration by Jean Cocteau, is located in the Bastion of the port of Menton. The bastion, built overwater in 1636 as an advance defence for the port by the Princes of Monaco, is now located at the shoreline.
- The wedding room at the Hôtel de Ville (town hall) was painted in the 1950s by Cocteau, transforming it into a giant work of art.
- Menton is home to at least half a dozen beaches.
- Menton is notable for its Palissy majolica pottery depicting lemons.
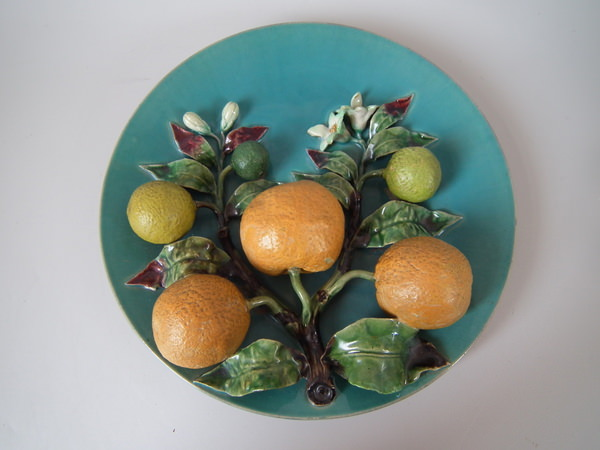
- The historic covered market was built in 1898 by local architect Adrien Rey. The market is open every day from 5 am until 1 pm in the summer; in the winter, it opens at 5:30 am. Over 30 kiosks both inside and around the market sell local and imported vegetables. The Belle Époque structure was one of buildings constructed by the architect in the region.
- Next to the beach and the covered market is the Jean Cocteau Museum. It opened in 2011 and is close to the Bastion Museum.
- Mirazur is a French haute cuisine restaurant with three Michelin Guide stars. The World's 50 Best Restaurants list ranks Mirazur as the best restaurant in the world.

== Population ==
Historical population

Year	Pop.	±% p.a.
1757	2,431	—
1793	3,060	+0.64%
1800	3,289	+1.04%
1806	3,336	+0.24%
1856	4,837	+0.75%
1861	4,904	+0.28%
1866	5,699	+3.05%
1872	6,644	+2.59%
1876	7,819	+4.16%
1881	11,000	+7.07%
1886	9,387	−3.12%
1891	9,050	−0.73%
1896	9,044	−0.01%
1901	9,944	+1.92%
1906	13,029	+5.55%
1911	18,001	+6.68%

Year	Pop.	±% p.a.
1921	18,645	+0.35%
1926	22,604	+3.93%
1931	23,417	+0.71%
1936	21,703	−1.51%
1946	13,864	−4.38%
1954	17,109	+2.66%
1962	19,904	+1.91%
1968	25,040	+3.90%
1975	25,143	+0.06%
1982	25,086	−0.03%
1990	29,141	+1.89%
1999	28,812	−0.13%
2007	28,683	−0.06%
2012	29,073	+0.27%
2017	28,958	−0.08%
2023	30,604	+0.93%

Source: IMSEE, EHESS and INSEE (1968-2023)

== Education ==
=== Primary and secondary schools ===
Public nurseries/Preschools include:

- Centre-ville/Vieille ville area: Adrien Camaret and the Section enfantine de l'Hôtel de Ville
- Borrigo: René Cassin, Germaine Coty, Robert Debré, and Manon des Sources
- Careï: Careï and Saint-Exupéry
- Garavan: Section enfantine Alphonse Daudet

Public primary schools include:

- Centre-ville/Vieille ville area: élémentaire Frédéric Mistral and primaire de l'Hôtel de Ville
- Borrigo: élémentaire Anne Frank - André Guillevin, élémentaire Condamine Centenaire, and élementaire Marcel Pagnol
- Careï: élémentaire Careï Jeanne d'Arc and élémentaire Saint-Exupéry
- Garavan: primaire Alphonse Daudet

There are two public junior high schools, Guillaume Vento and André Maurois. The two public sixth-form colleges/senior high schools are Lycée Pierre et Marie Curie and Lycée Professionnel Hôtelier Paul Valéry.

The private Institution Notre Dame du Sacré Cœur has the Villa Blanche preschool, primary, and junior high school in the Centre-ville area.

=== Colleges and universities ===
- The Institut d'Etudes politiques de Paris, the leading French university in social and political sciences, also known as Sciences Po, has been hosting a regional Middle East and Mediterranean campus in Menton since 2005.

== Mentonasc language ==
The Mentonasc dialect is currently spoken by about 10% of the population in Menton, Roquebrune, and the surrounding villages. It is taught within the French educational system, as a variety of Niçard (i.e. Provençal and Occitan). However, in nineteenth-century linguistic descriptions, as well as in contemporary linguistic scholarship, Mentonasc is described as an intermediate between Niçard and the Intemelio dialect of Ligurian. Some scholars insist that Mentonasc is, at its base, a Ligurian dialect, with French influences coming only later.

== Annual town events ==
The Fête du Citron (Lemon Festival) takes place every February. The event follows a given theme each decade; past themes include Viva España, Disney, Neverland, and India. The carnival lasts a few days, with different bands passing through Menton's streets on foot or on truck trailers. The Casino Gardens in the centre of town are decorated in the theme of the festival, using lemons and oranges to cover the exhibits, and huge temporary statues are built and covered with citrus fruit.

The Casino Gardens are also the location for Menton's Christmas Festival.

The Menton Classical Musical Festival is also held every year in the centre of the old town.

Menton Fête du Citron

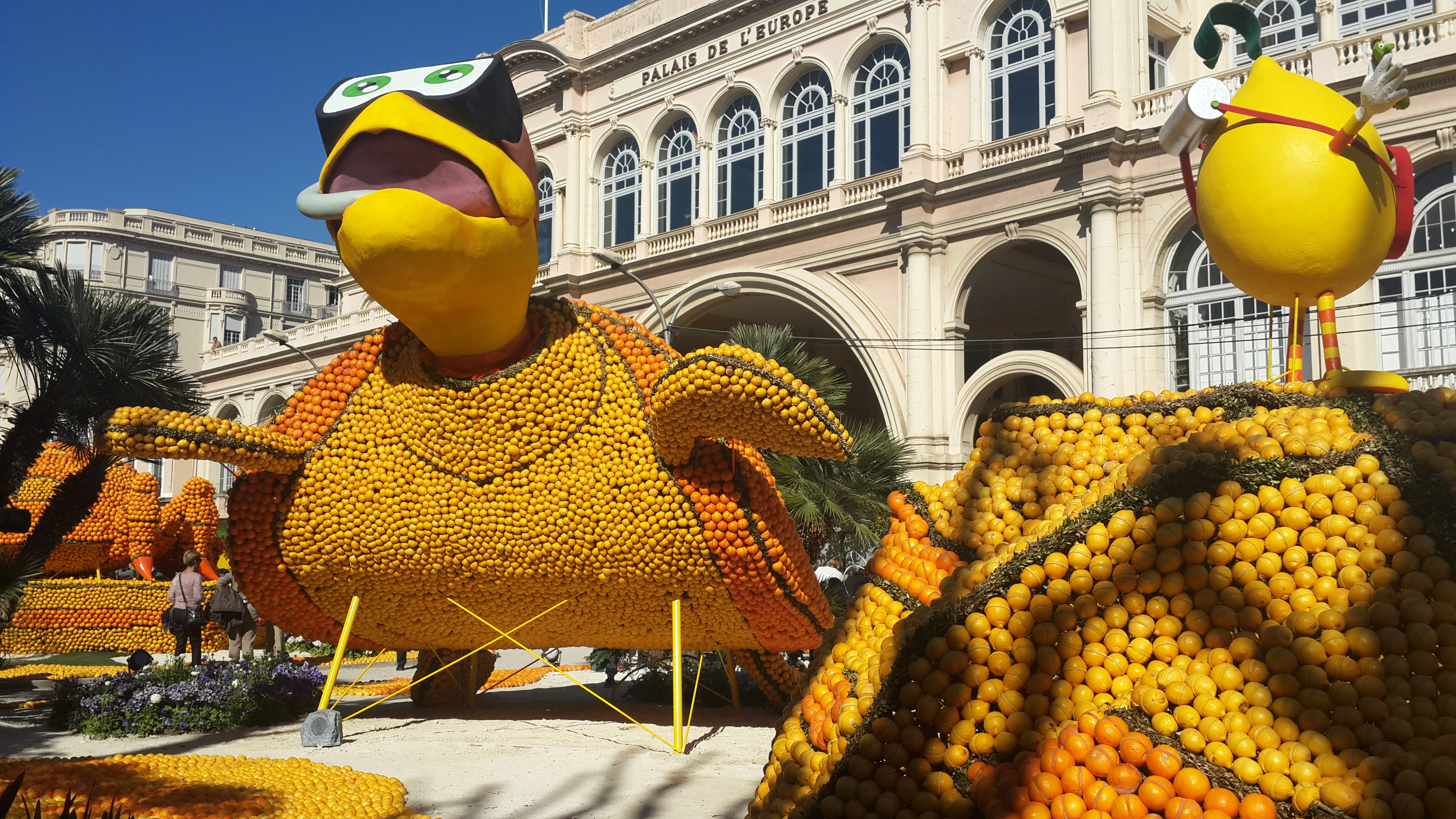

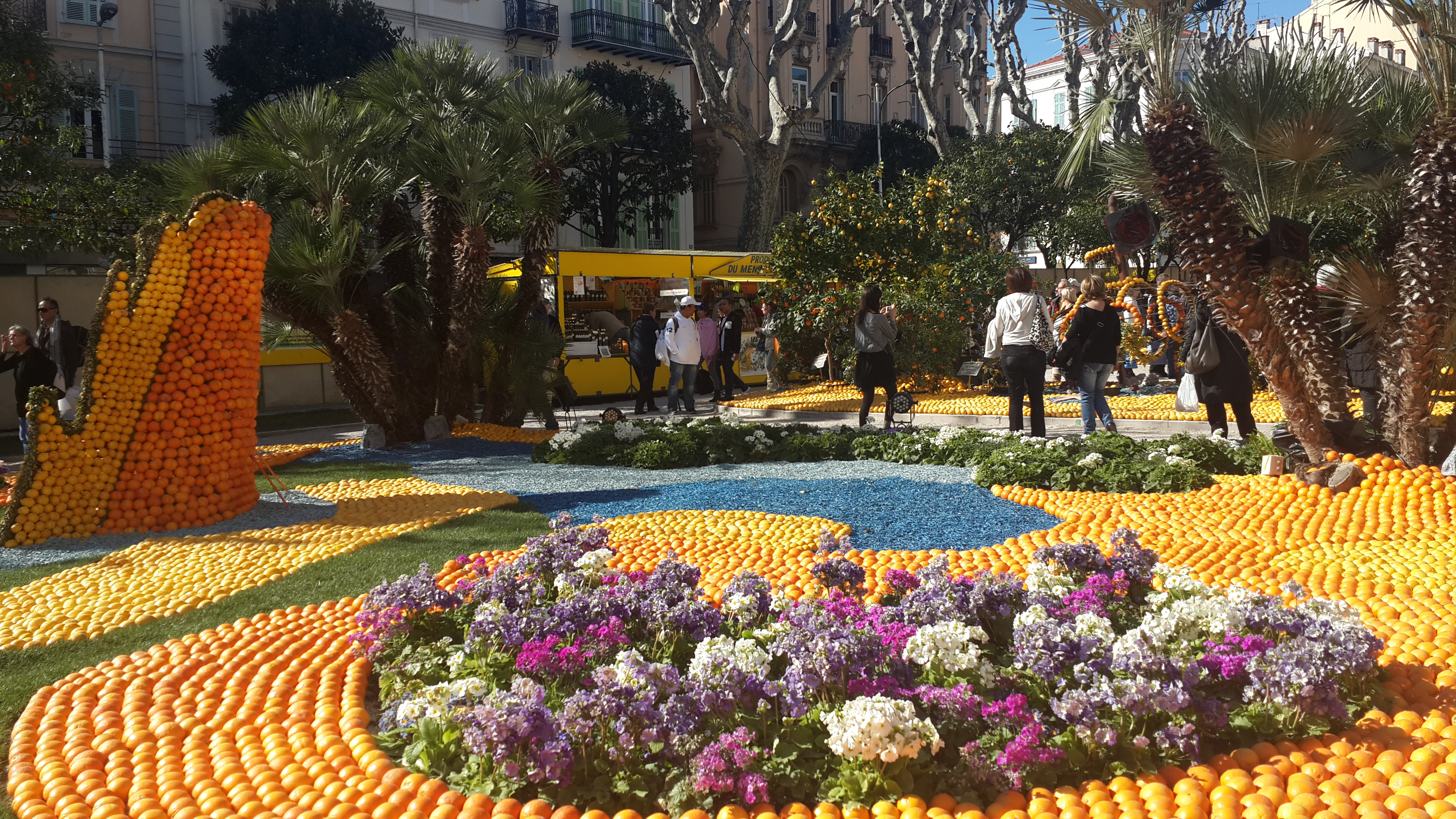

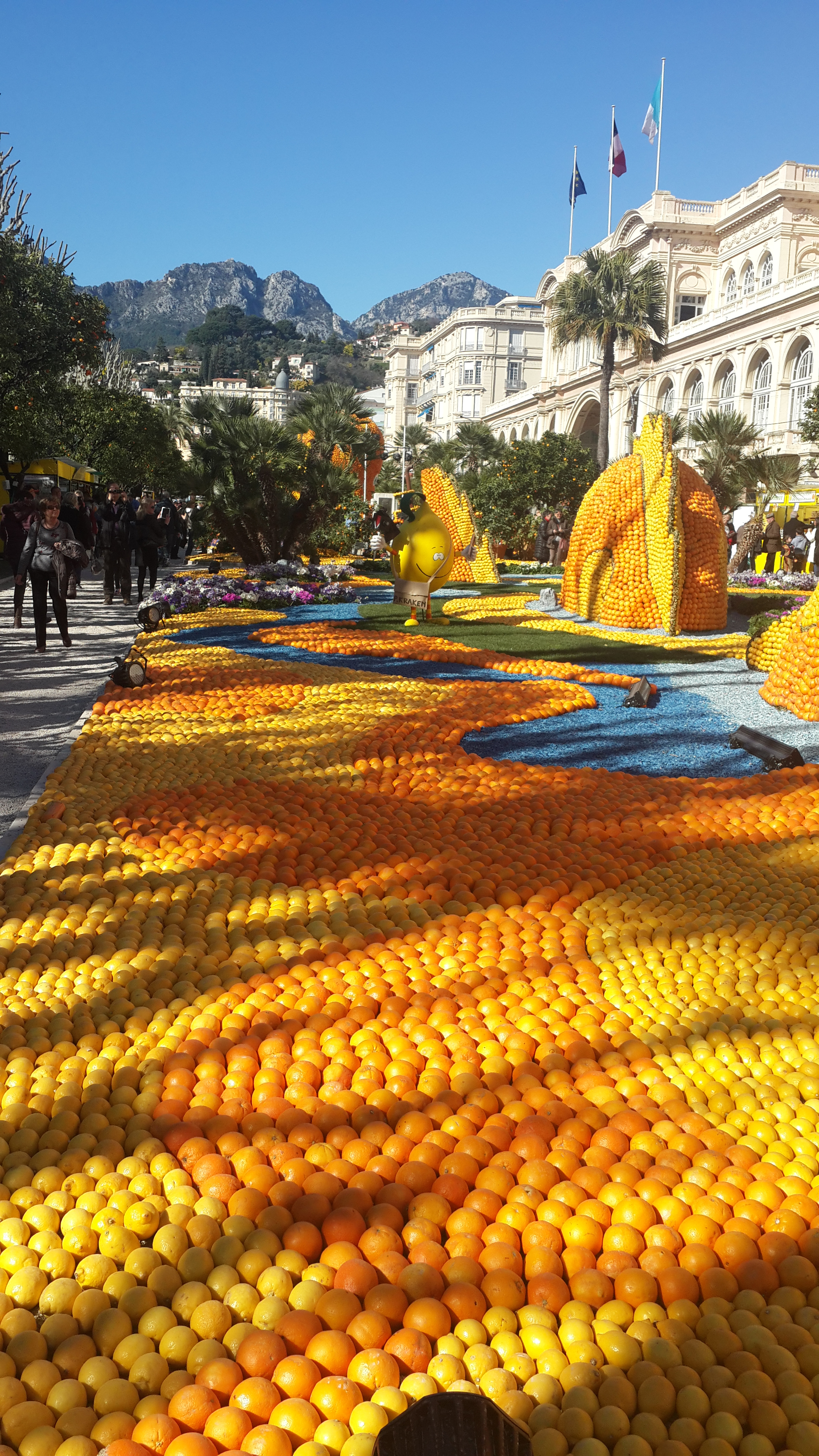

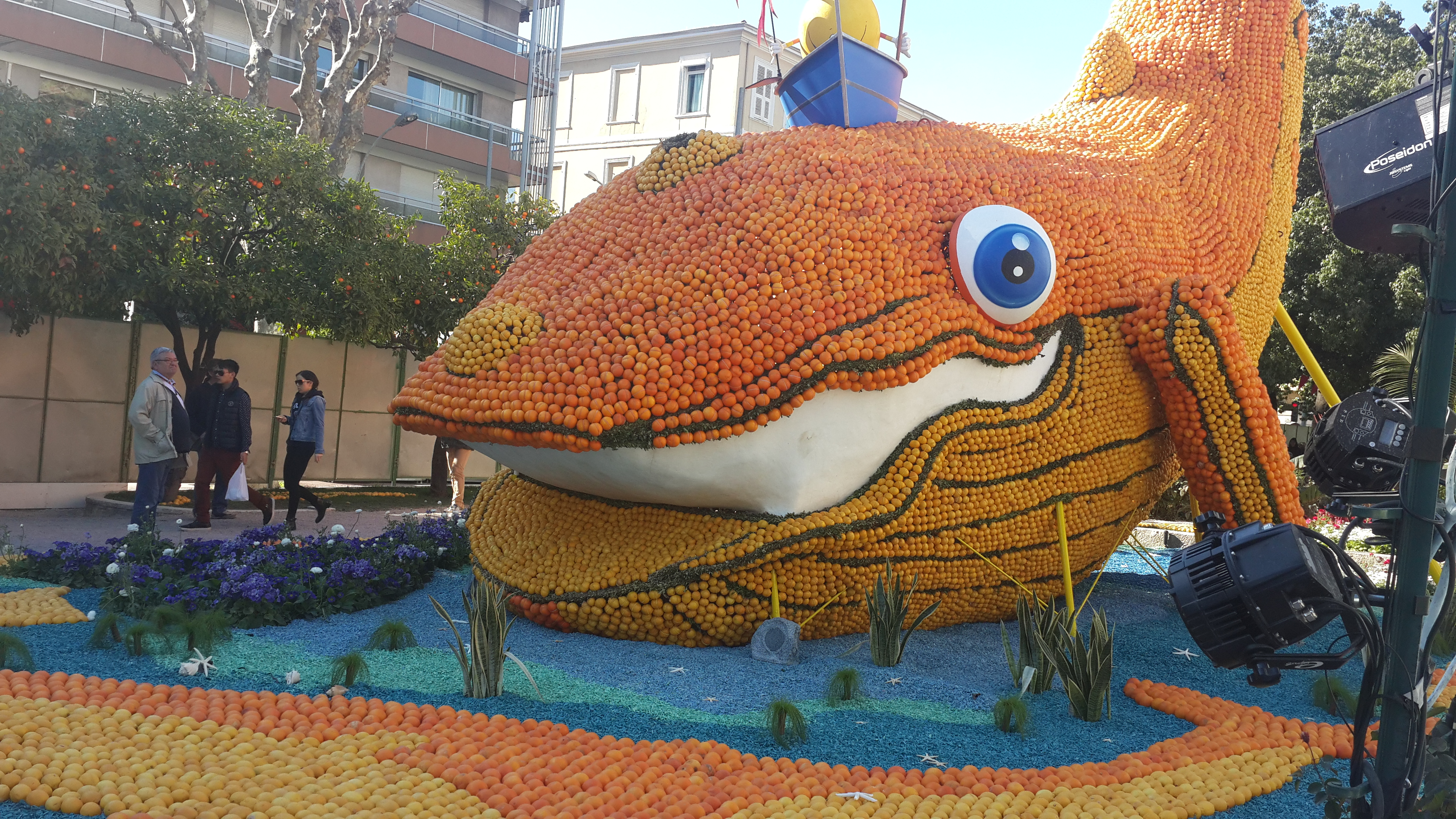

Also in Menton, celebrated on the first weekend of July, is the procession and celebration of Saint-Pierre (Sant Pie), the patron of fishermen. The procession begins in the Basilique Saint-Michel de Menton. Dancers, singers, and musicians in traditional costumes from La Capelina de Menton perform in the basilica. The crowds then head to a dock where boats are filled with people throwing flowers into the port. They then pay tribute to those who have lost their lives at sea. After the boats return, they start celebrating with the traditional fish soup.

== Sport and recreation ==
Menton has a football team, Rapid de Menton, who play at the stadium Stade Lucien Rhein. Menton also has a rugby team, Le rugby Club Webb Ellis de Menton.

There is a municipal swimming pool, Piscine Alex Jany.

The town is famous in the cycling world as being the start of the climb of the Col de la Madone de Gorbio (generally shortened to Col de la Madone), which rises to 925 metres and was (in)famously used by Lance Armstrong to train for the Tour de France; many professionals based in neighbouring Monaco still use the climb for training and testing.

Menton was also the location of an international tennis tournament the Riviera Championships that ran from 1902 to 1976. It was hosted by the Menton Lawn Tennis Club. The event was part of the French Riviera circuit tour.

== Notable residents ==
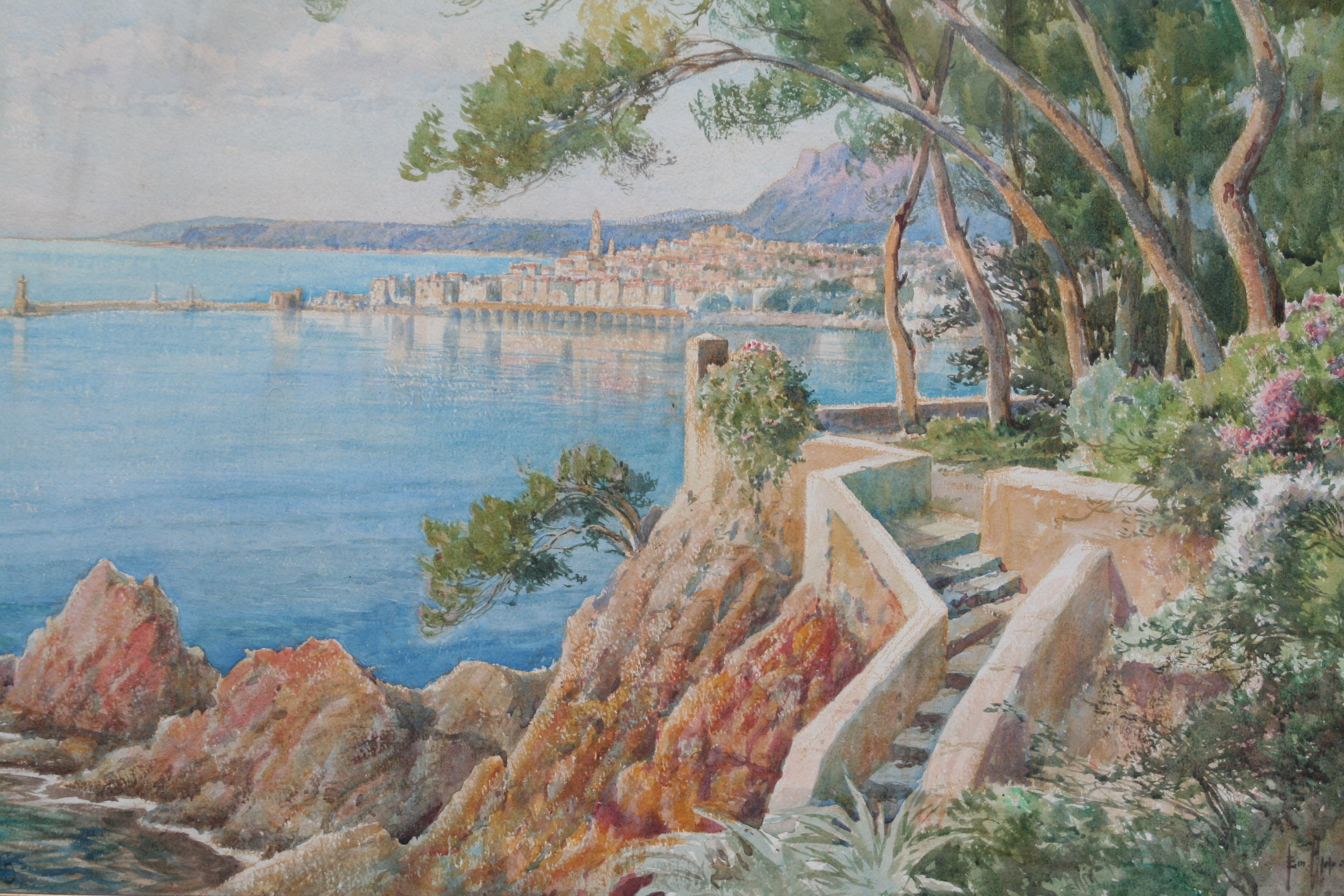
Émile Appay – Menton

Notables who were born, lived, or died in Menton include:

=== Living people ===
- Jérôme Alonzo (born 1972), French first division football goalkeeper, born in Menton
- Richard Anconina (born 1953), French actor; before his film career he worked for several years at a holiday club for seniors in Menton
- Olivier Echouafni (born 1972), French first-division football midfielder, born in Menton
- Sébastien Gattuso (born 1971), Monégasque athlete specializing in bobsledding
- Cédric Varrault (born 1980), French first-division football defender. He began his career with the Menton football club.
- Louis Sarközy de Nagy-Bocsa (born 28 April 1997) is a French-American writer and political commentator who is the son of the former President of France Nicolas Sarkozy and Cécilia Attias.

=== Historical figures ===
- Émile Appay (1876–1935), French landscape painter. He spent time in Menton over the years capturing paintings of the sea.
- Ferdinand Bac (1859–1952), French illustrator, lithographer, and writer. He developed the house and gardens of Les Colombières above Menton for Émile and Caroline Ladan-Bockairy. The house contains frescoes and modernist furniture by Bac, with a large garden set over several levels. Les Colombières is a Monument Historique and has been recently restored.
- Aubrey Vincent Beardsley (1872–1898), English illustrator and author
- Morton Betts (1847–1914), Leading English sportsman of the late 19th century. Scored the first goal in an English FA Cup Final. Died in Menton.
- Lesley Blanch (1904–2007), English-born writer
- Vicente Blasco Ibáñez (1867–1928), Spanish author. At the end of his life, he lived on his estate, Fontana Rosa, in Menton.
- Thomas Carlyle (1795–1881), Scottish essayist, historian and philosopher. He lived at the home of Louisa Baring, Lady Ashburton, from December 1866 to March 1867 following the death of his wife Jane Welsh Carlyle.
- René Clément (1913–1996), film director
- Jean Cocteau (1889–1963), French artist. He spent much time in Menton over the years; the Jean Cocteau Museum is in Menton. He decorated the wedding room in Menton's town hall, and the small stone bastion in Menton's harbour wall.
- Alfred Edersheim (1825–1889), Jewish Biblical scholar. He died in Menton.
- Michel Evdokimov (1930–2025), theologian and Russian Orthodox priest; born in Menton.
- Ivan Grigorovich (1853–1930), Imperial Russian Navy admiral. He lived in Menton after the Russian Revolution.
- Alfred Fréderic Hegenscheidt (1866-1964), Belgian professor of Geography (Université Libre de Bruxelles) and best known for his lyric drama Starkadd, published in 1897 in the famous Flemish Literary Magazine Van Nu en Straks.
- Panait Istrati (1884–1935), Romanian writer of French and Romanian expression (friends with Romain Rolland). He lived in Menton for a brief period and has a street in Menton named after him.
- Joseph Joffo (1931–2018), French author. He lived temporarily in Menton during World War II.
- President Paul Kruger spent 2 years in Menton in Exile
- Anatoly Lunacharsky (1875–1933), Russian Marxist revolutionary and the first Soviet People's Commissar of Enlightenment responsible for culture and education. He died in Menton.
- George Macleay (1809–1891), Australian explorer and politician. He died in Menton.
- Katherine Mansfield (1888–1923), New Zealand modernist short story writer who lived and worked in a street now named after her. Her former home, the Villa Isola Bella, is used as the residence for New Zealand writers who receive the Katherine Mansfield Menton Fellowship to live and write there for a year.
- James Matheson (1796–1878), Scottish trader in India, co-founder of Jardine Matheson & Co. He died in Menton 31 December 1878 (aged 82).
- General Sir Percy Pollexfen de Blaquiere Radcliffe KCB KCMG DSO (1874–1934), British army officer. He owned a house in Menton from 1905 to 1934. Its gardens were the basis for the town's botanical gardens and are named after his first wife Rahmeh.
- Anne Redpath (1895–1965), Scottish artist.
- Charles H. Spurgeon (1834–1892), British Baptist preacher. He died in Menton.
- Graham Sutherland (1903–1980), English painter
- Philip Meadows Taylor (1808–1876), British Indian civil servant and author
- Hans-Georg Tersling (1857–1920), Danish architect. He designed many buildings in the town.
- William Webb Ellis (1806–1872), inventor of rugby. He lived in Menton at the end of his life and is buried in the old cemetery.
- William Butler Yeats (1865–1939), Irish writer, poet and Nobel laureate. He died in Menton and was later exhumed to Drumcliff co. Sligo, Ireland.

== International relations ==
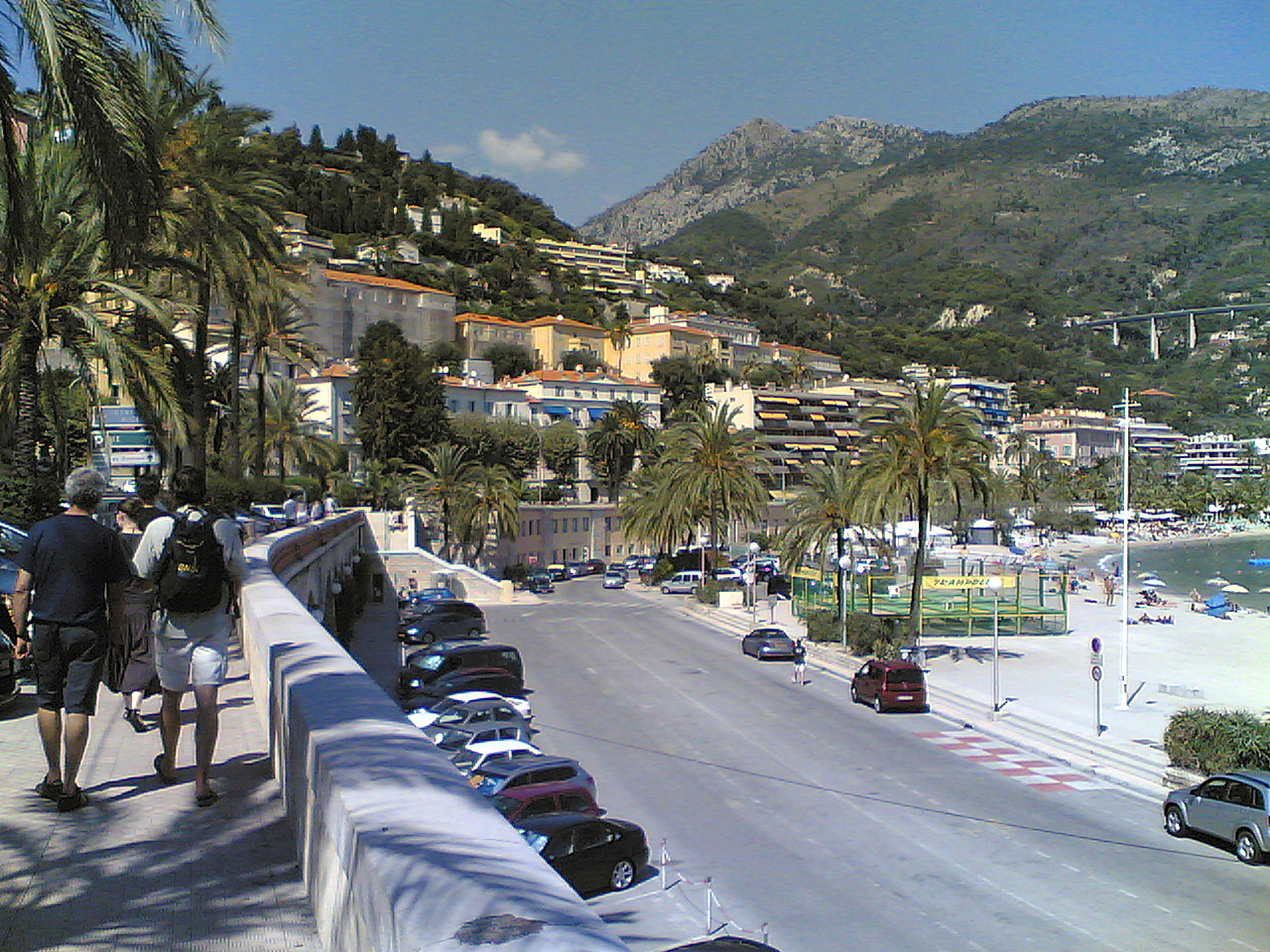
Menton

Menton is twinned with:

- Sanremo, Italy
- Baden-Baden, Germany
- Laguna Beach, United States
- Montreux, Switzerland
- Nafplio, Greece
- Sochi, Russia

== See also ==
- Knights of the Redeemer
- Mentonasc
- Roquebrune-Cap-Martin
- List of historical unrecognized states
- Former countries in Europe after 1815
- Intermelio
- Antoine Sartorio
- Communes of the Alpes-Maritimes department
