= Menton station =

Railway station in Menton, France

Menton
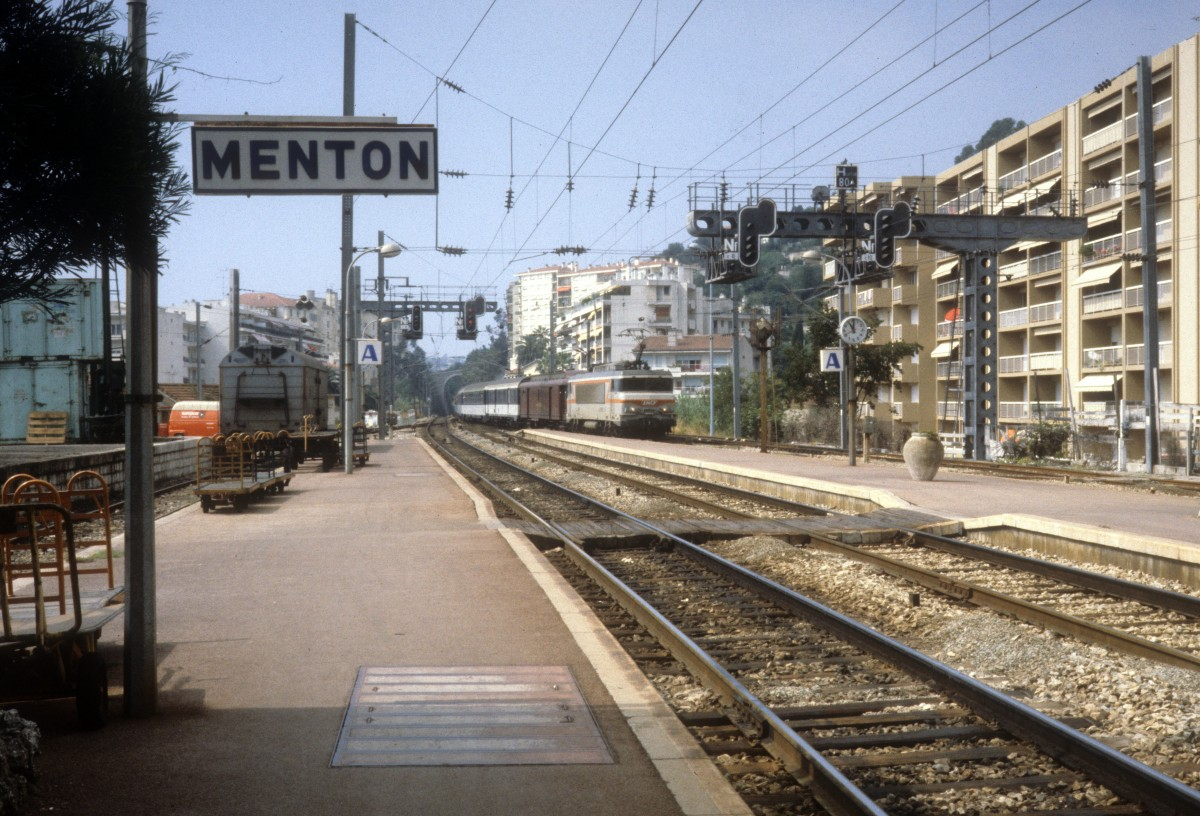
- Menton railway station

General information
- Location: Menton, Alpes-Maritimes; Provence-Alpes-Côte d'Azur, France
- Coordinates: 43°46′29″N 7°29′37″E
- Line: Marseille–Ventimiglia railway
- Platforms: 3
- Tracks: 4

Other information
- Station code: 87756486

History
- Opened: 6 December 1869

Passengers
- 2024: 2,764,116

Services
Preceding station	SNCF	Following station
Monaco-Monte-Carlo towards Paris-Lyon	TGV inOui Seasonal service	Terminus
Preceding station	TER PACA	Following station
Carnolès towards Mandelieu-la-Napoule or Grasse	4	Menton-Garavan towards Ventimiglia
Location

Menton is a railway station located in Menton, Alpes-Maritimes, southeastern France. The station was opened in 1869 and is located on the Marseille–Ventimiglia railway. The train services are operated by SNCF.

== Train services ==
The station is served by the following service(s):

- High speed services (TGV) Paris - Cannes - Nice - Monaco - Menton
- Local services (TER Provence-Alpes-Côte-d'Azur) Grasse/Mandelieu - Cannes - Nice - Monaco - Ventimiglia
