= Jean Gilletta =

French photographer (1856–1933)

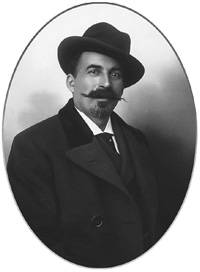
Gilletta circa 1910

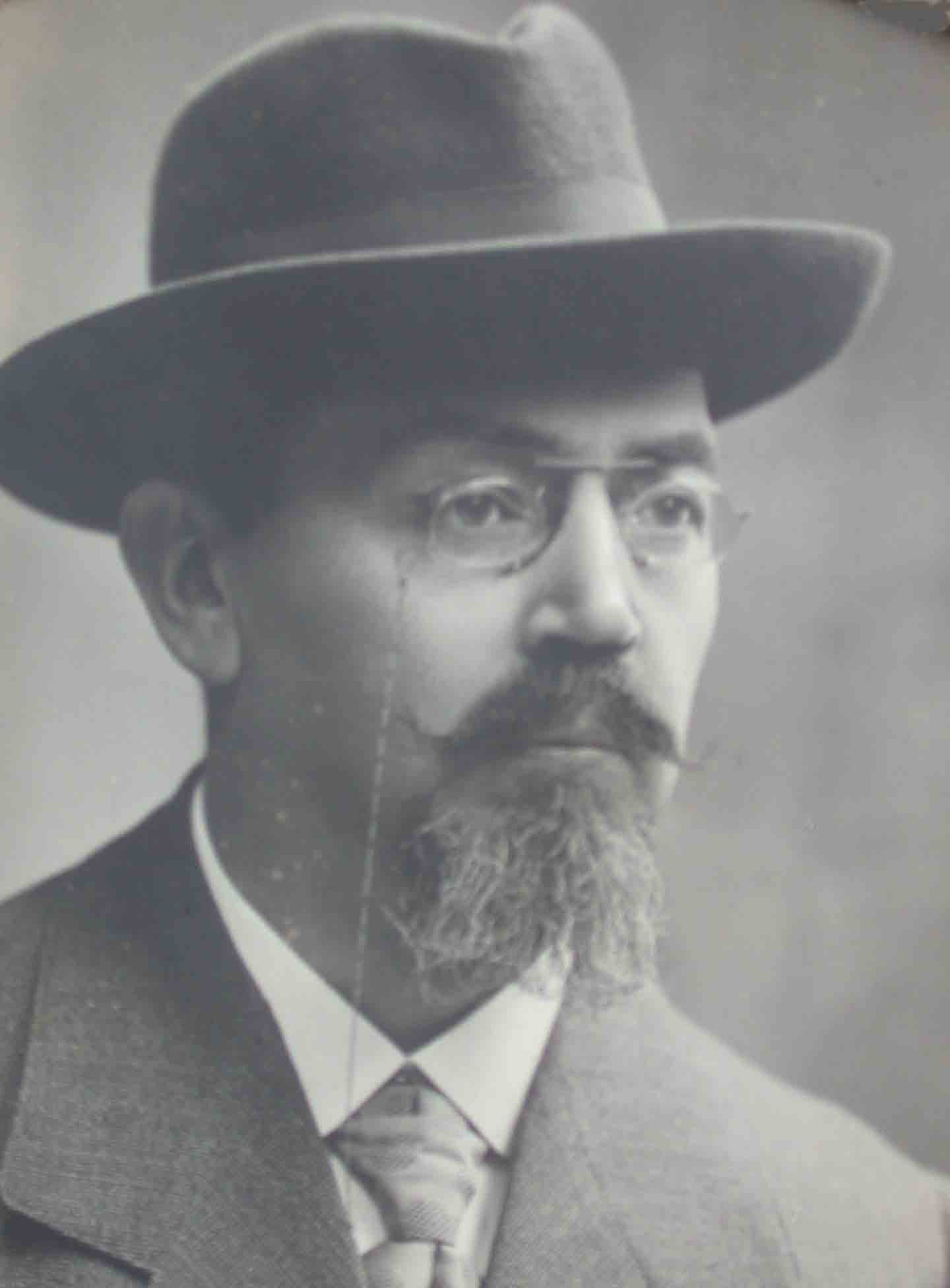
Circa 1925

Jean Gilletta (1 May 1856 Levens, Division of Nice, Sardinian States – 4 February 1933), born Jean-Baptiste Gilletta and whose name is sometimes spelled Jean Giletta, was a French photographer. He was active in Nice, France and founded a postcard company in 1897.

As an official gift to mark the end of his visit to the French Riviera in May 1914, President Raymond Poincaré was given album of Gilletta's photographs by the departmental council of Alpes-Maritimes.

== Exhibitions ==
- Jean Gilletta, Photographe de la Riviera. Exhibition held 2 December 2006 – 18 March 2007 at the Théâtre de la Photographie et de l'Image Charles Nègre, Nice.
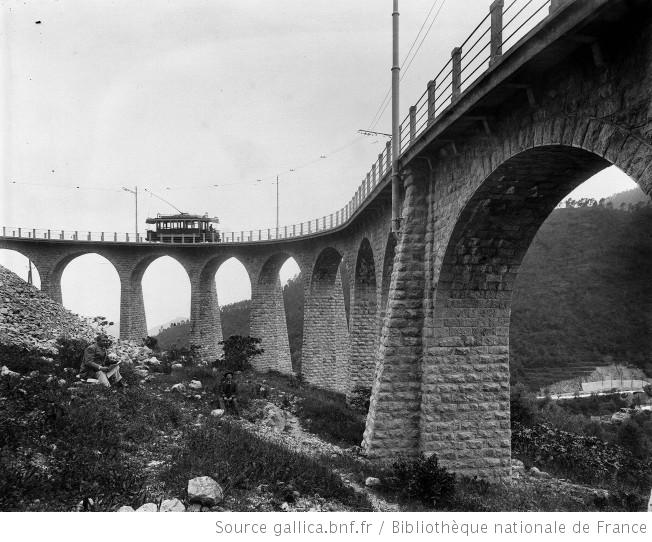
Viaduc du Caramel

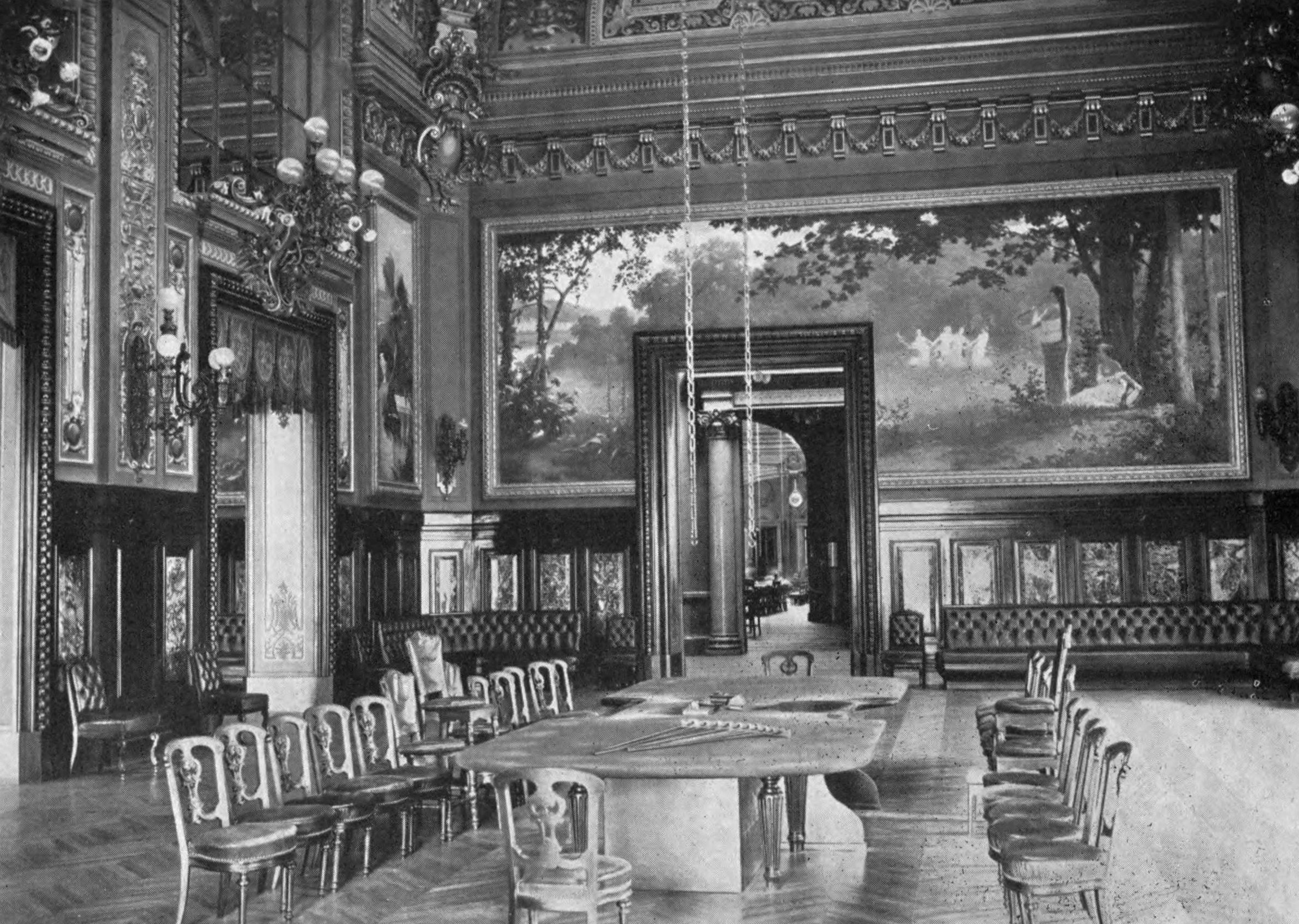
Monte Carlo gambling saloon

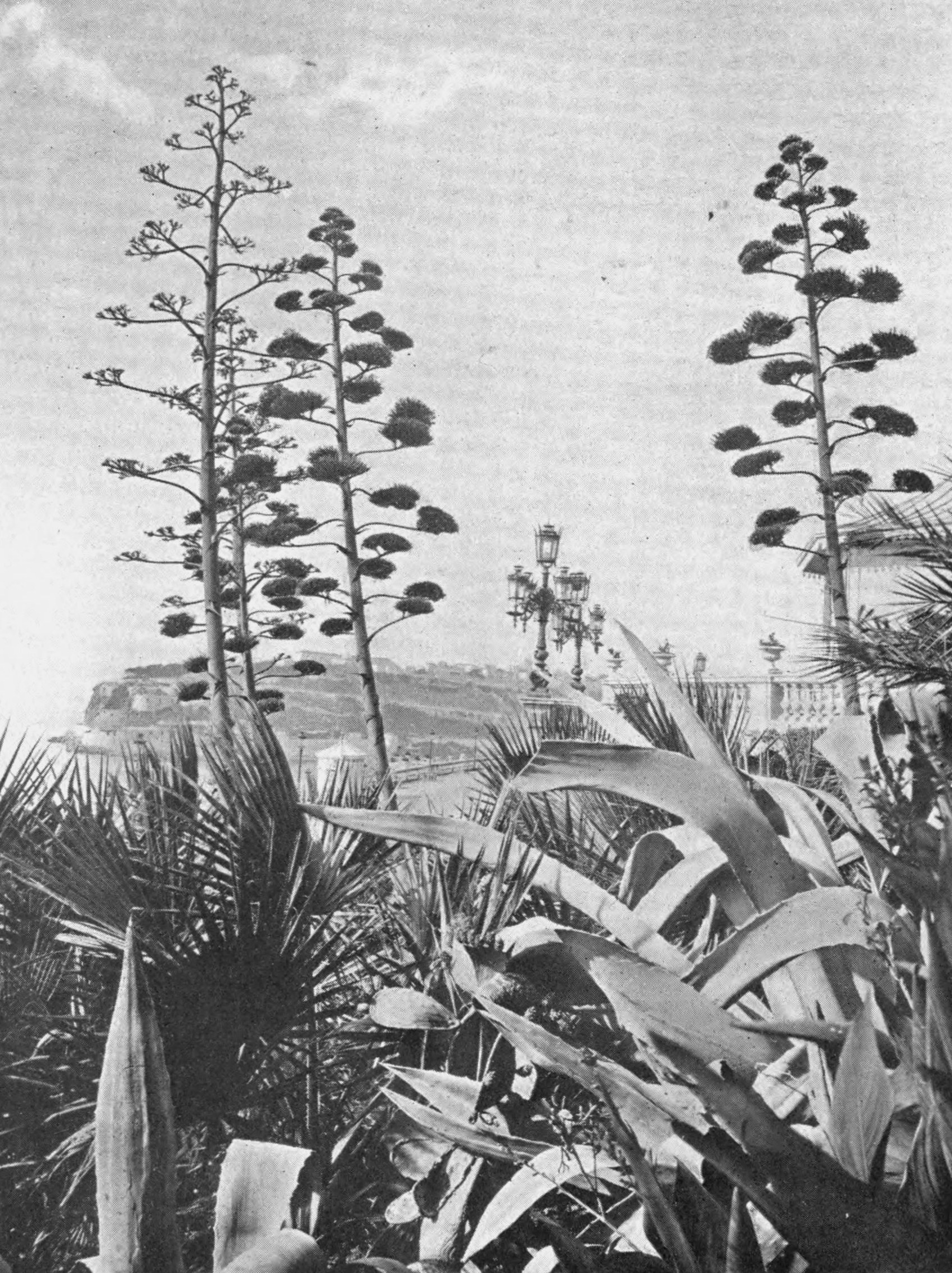
"God's Candelabra"

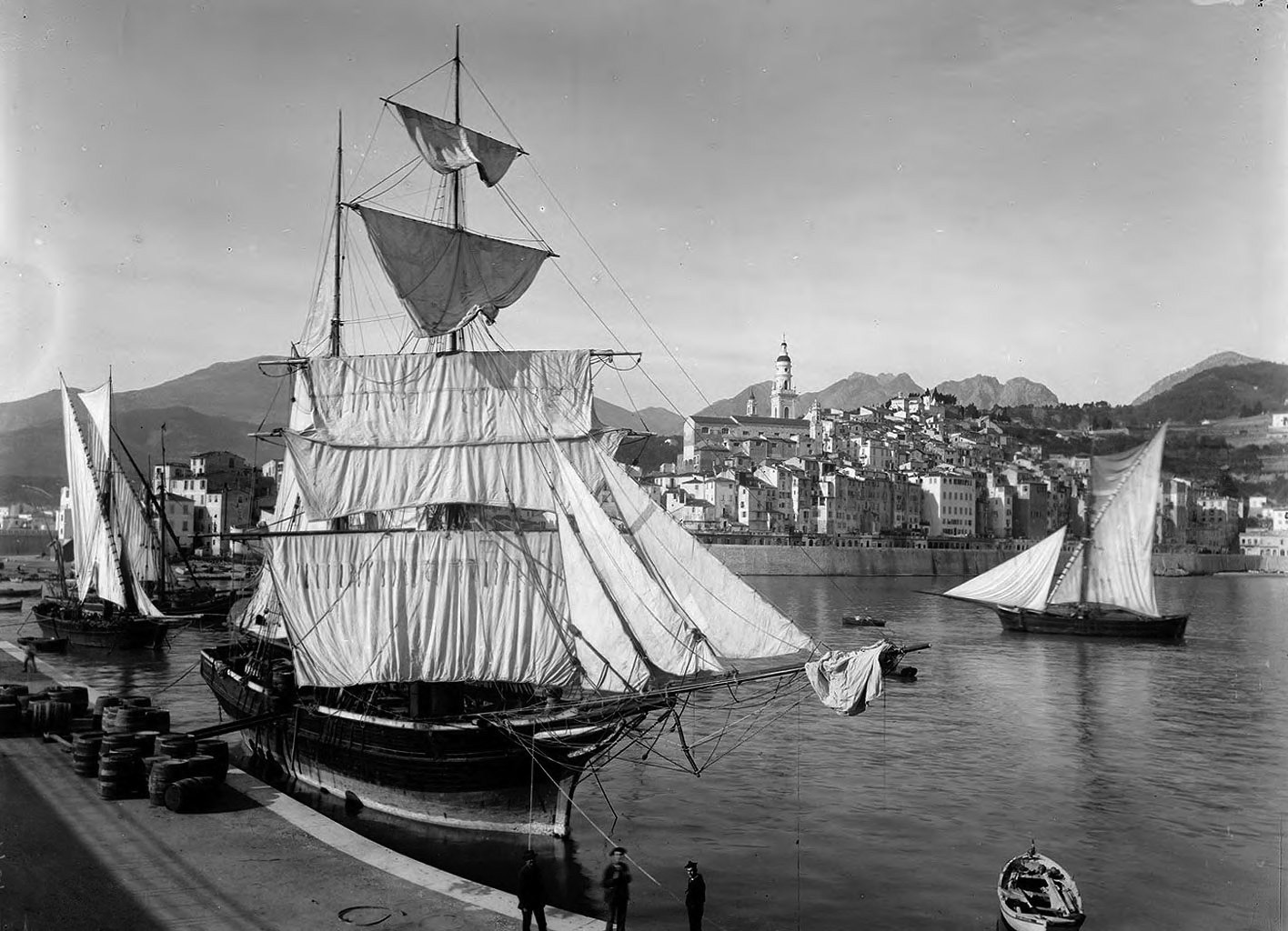
Sailboats in Menton harbor
