= Émile Appay =

French painter (1876–1935)

- Born: 2 June 1876; Saint-Just (Eure – France)
- Died: 7 October 1935 (aged 59)
- Known for: Painting, Watercolor painting

Émile Appay (2 June 1876–7 October 1935) was a French landscape painter.

He studied under Henri-Joseph Harpignies and Paul Lecomte. He was a friend of André Derain.

From 1922 to 1932 he travelled around several countries in Europe, while helping to make stage sets for the Georges Pitoëff theatre troupe.

== Exhibitions ==
Some exhibitions of Appay in different galleries in Paris:

- Galerie Georges Petit
- Galerie Pierre Le Chevallier
- Galerie Jules Gautier

His paintings were also shown at the Salon des artistes français from 1910 to 1920.

== Paintings ==
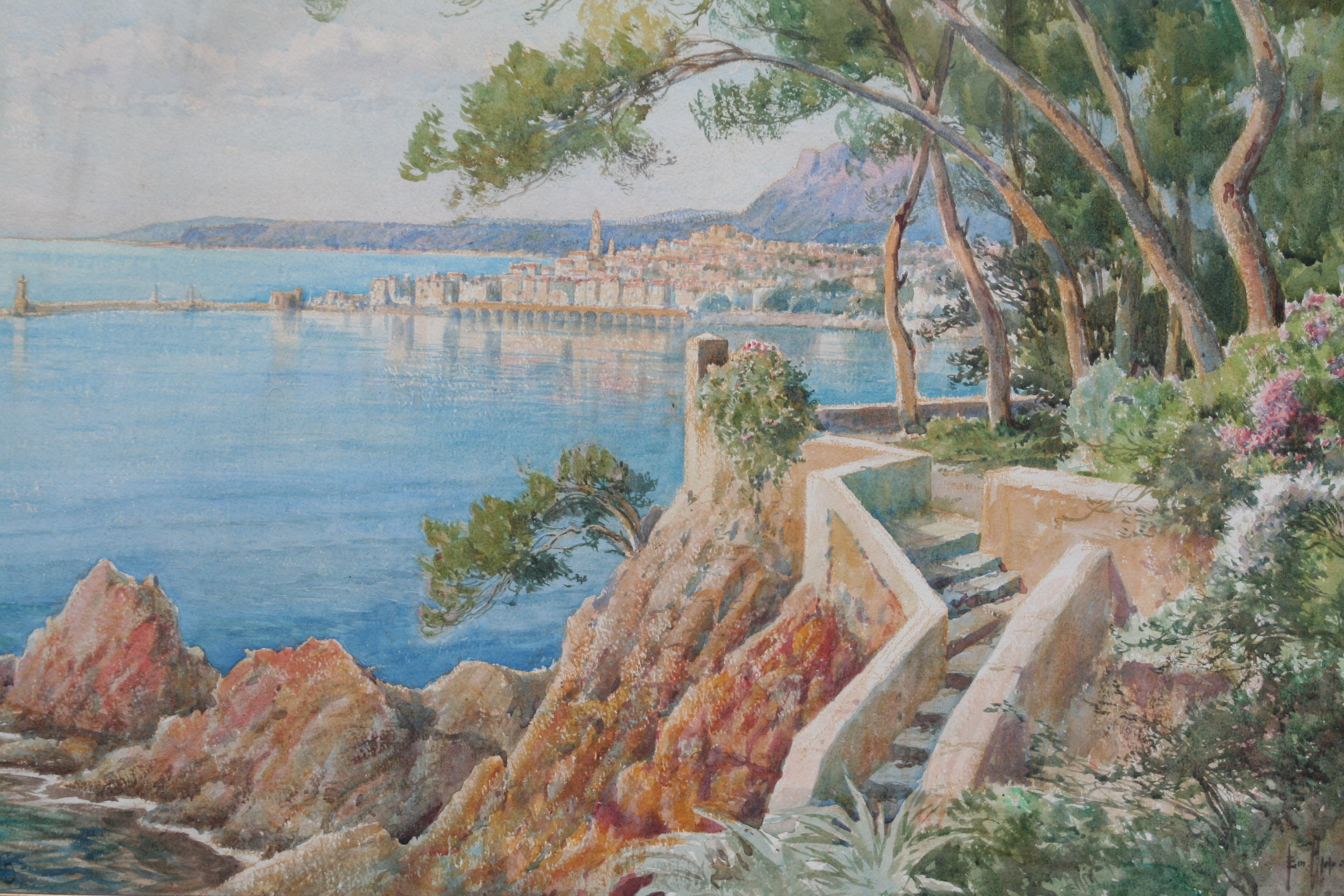
Emile Appay – Menton

- Le Port de Marseille – Aquarelle (38 x 57 cm)
- Rue des halles et tour Charlemagne à Tours – Aquarelle (39,5 x 29 cm)
- Menton – (70 x 54 cm)
- Pont sur la Seine à Rouen – Peinture, Huile/toile (38x55 cm)
- Vue de la Salute, Venise – Peinture, Huile/toile (38x55 cm)
- Rue de Louviers animée (Eure) – Aquarelle (33x44 cm).
- Le Château Gaillard – Au petit Andely – Aquarelle (60x75 cm)
