= Fête du Citron =

Annual carnival event held in Menton, France

Lemon Festival Fête du Citron
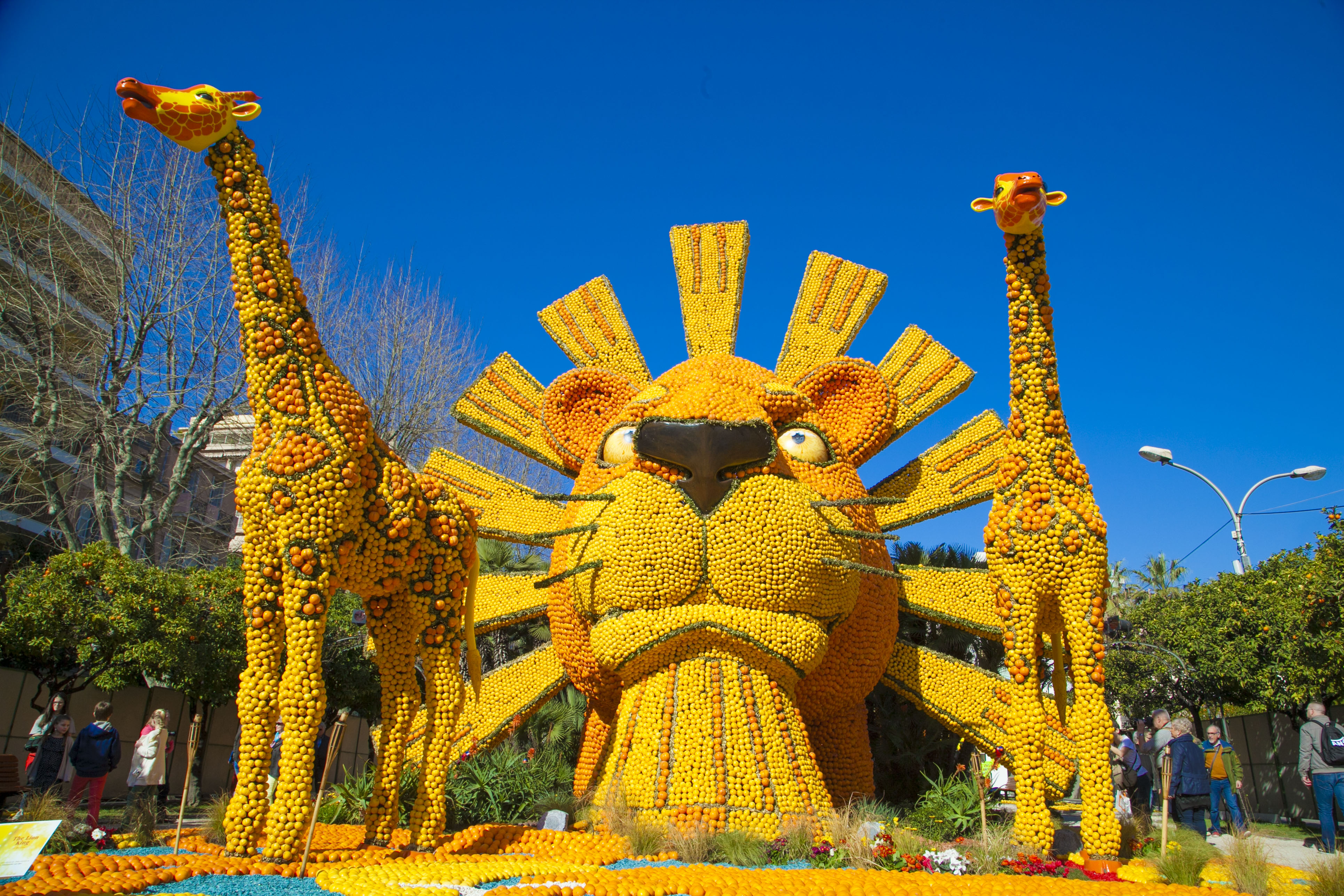
- 84th Fête du Citron, 2017
- Status: Active
- Genre: Festivals
- Date: mid-February
- Frequency: Annual
- Venue: Menton
- Country: France
- Inaugurated: 1875
- Website: fete-du-citron.com

Fête du Citron (Occitan: Festival de Limòn) is a carnival event organised by the tourist office of the city of Menton, France, and held every year at the end of winter. It is also sometimes called Carnaval de Menton (Carnival of Menton).

The festival, held every year in mid-February, celebrates the annual production of specialty lemons and other citrus fruit in Menton. All of the floats and sculptures present at the carnival are created from lemons and oranges. Fête du Citron has been recognised by the Ministry of Culture of France, and it was entered in the inventory of intangible cultural heritage in 2019.

== History ==
In 1875, hoteliers proposed to the municipality to create a carnival parade to enliven the city in winter. As early as 1876, the event attracted locals and wealthy winter visitors alike. At the time, it was fashionable for the wealthy to come and spend the winter months in the mild climate of the French Riviera. Kings, princes, and artists flocked to palaces in the city or had villas built there. The 1882 edition of the carnival was notably attended by Queen Victoria of the United Kingdom and it culminated with a fireworks display over Garavan Bay. The Carnival of Menton bears some similarities to its cousin from neighbouring Nice: a parade of large heads, confetti streams, flower battles, Mardi Gras celebration, and finally, the burning in effigy of the "Majesty of the Carnival". The feasts which surround the celebration mark the period before Lent.

=== Lemon Festival ===
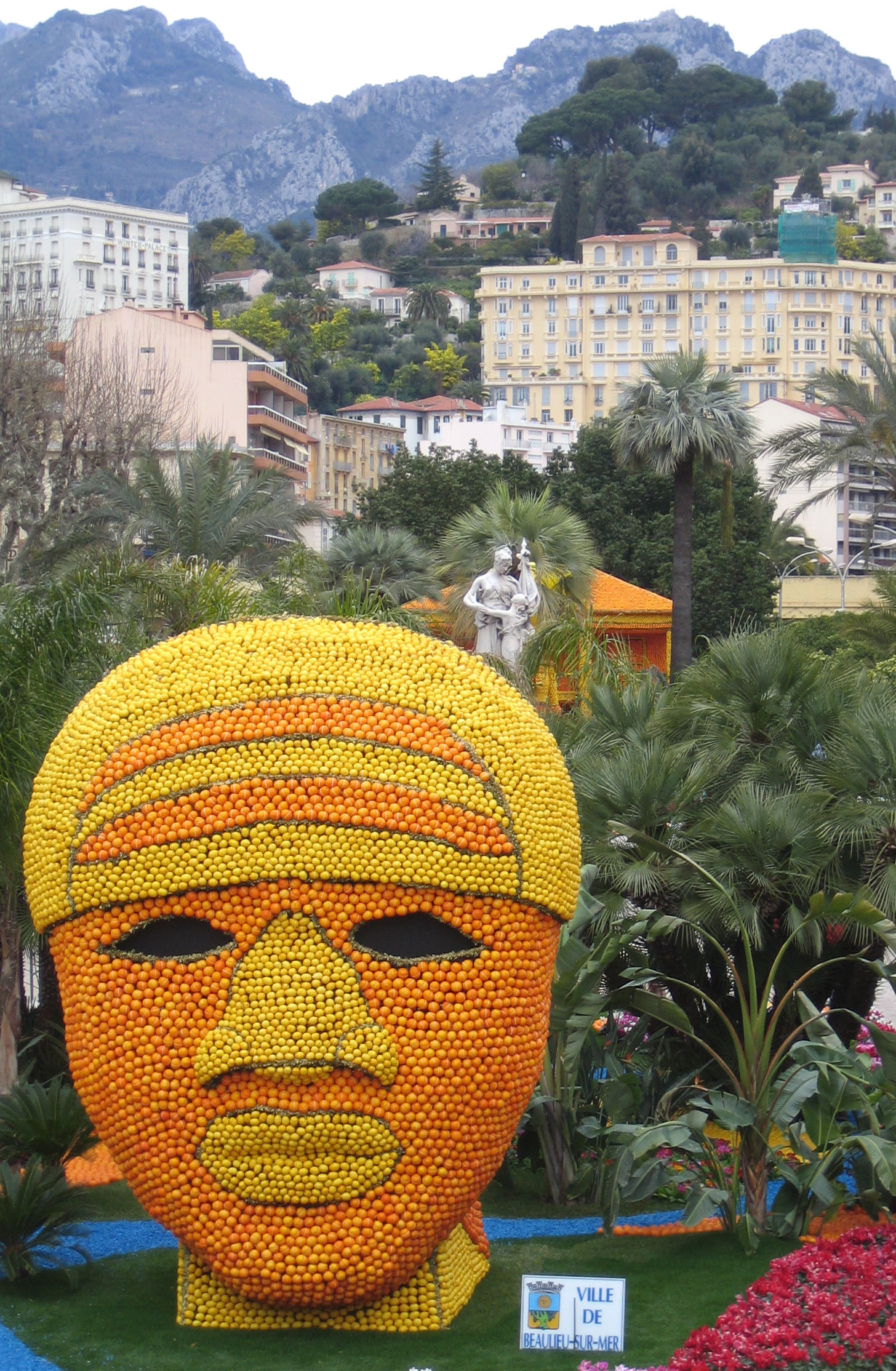
Giant mask float at the 73rd Fête du Citron, 2006

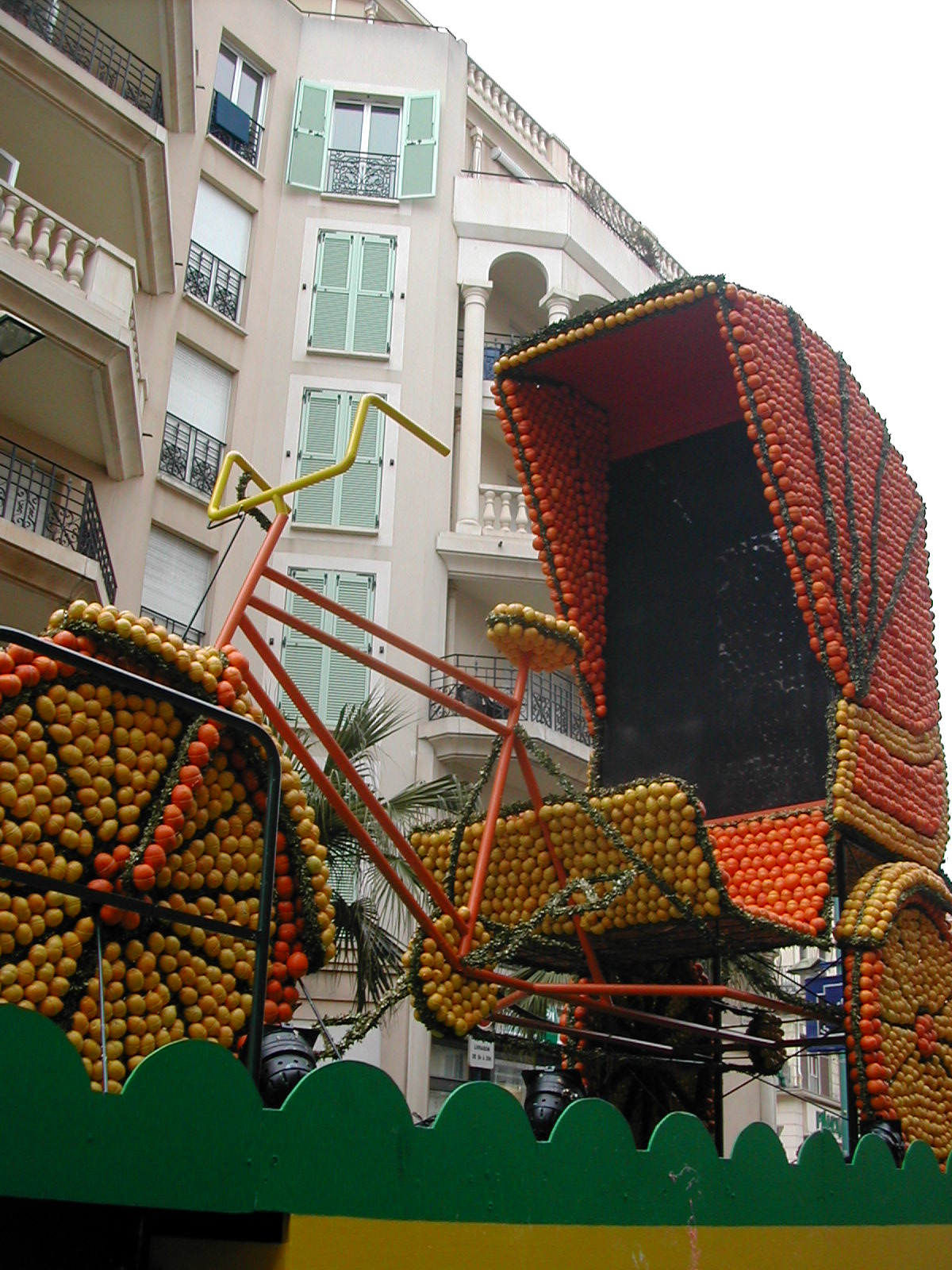
Rickshaw float at the 74th Fête du Citron, 2007

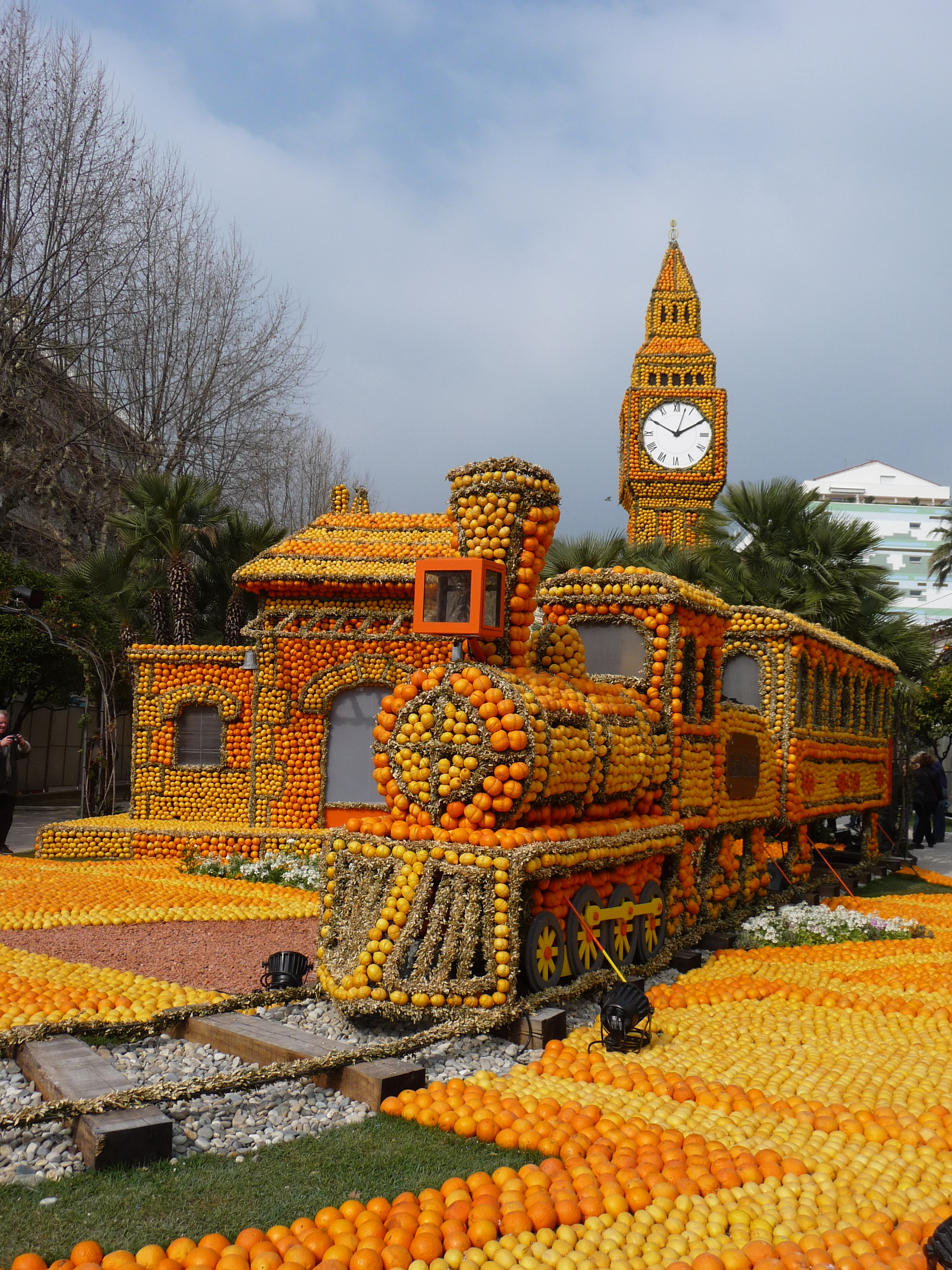
Train float at the 80th Fête du Citron, 2013

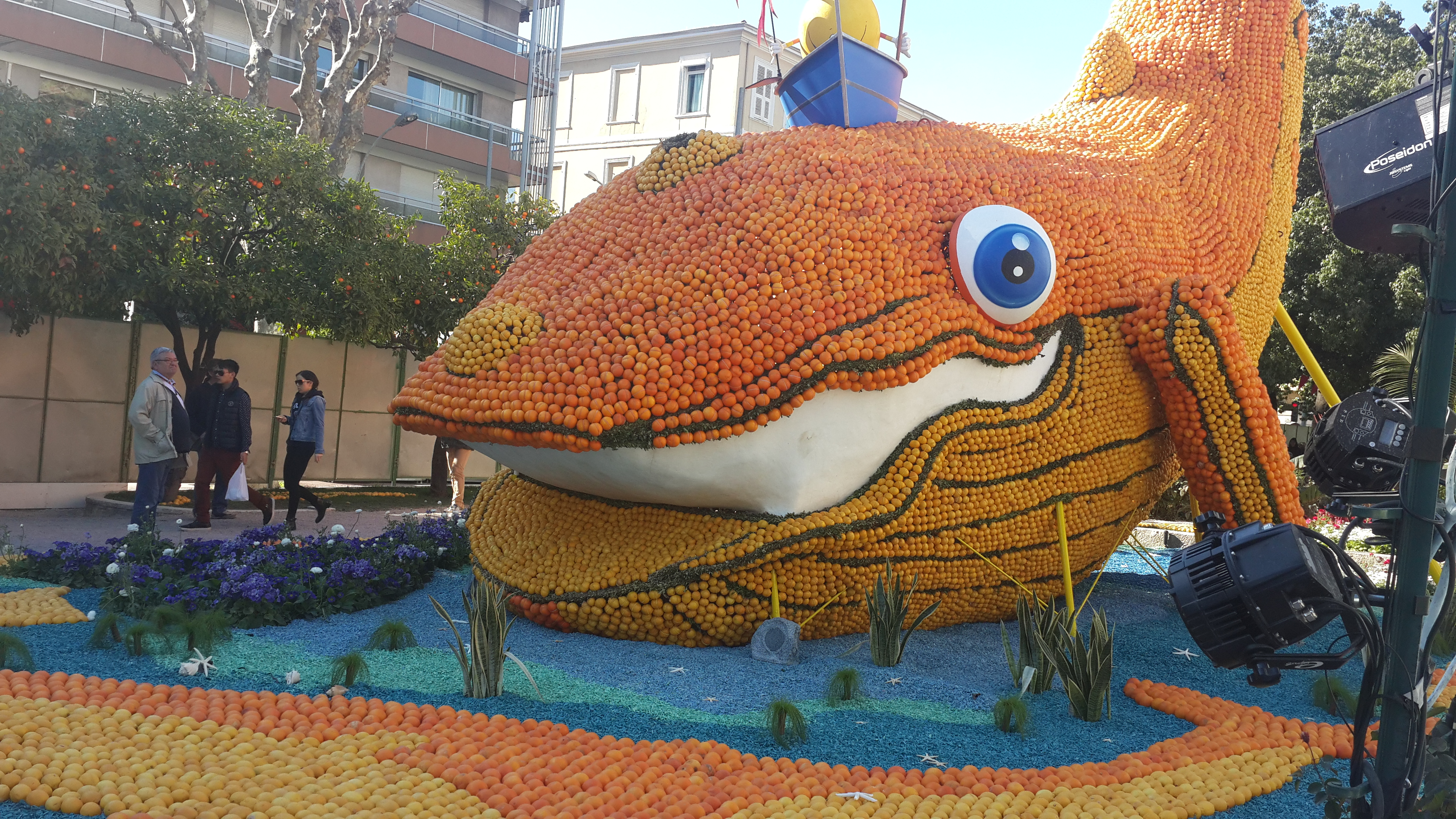
Whale float at the 81st Fête du Citron, 2014

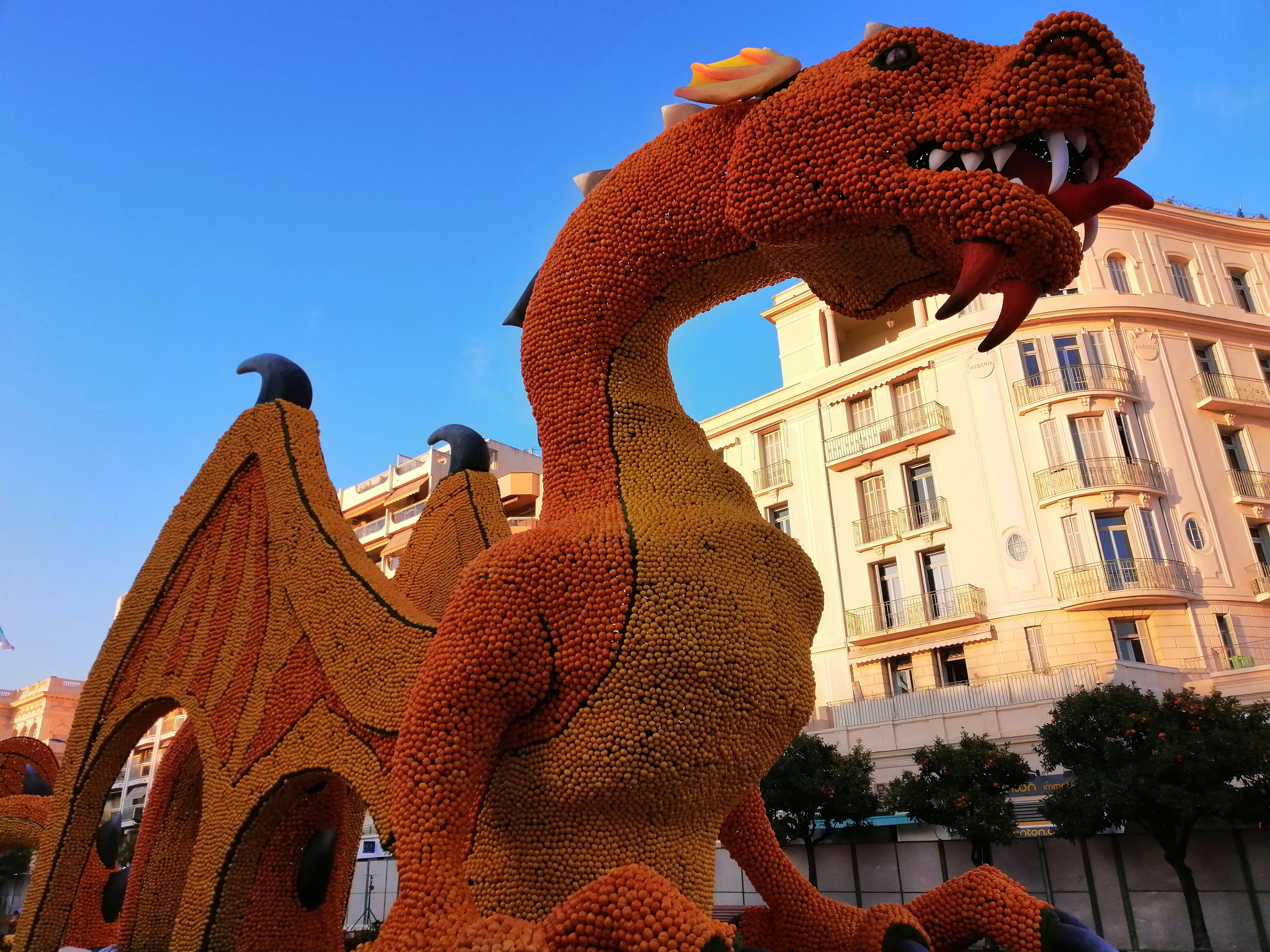
Dragon float at the 86th Fête du Citron, 2019

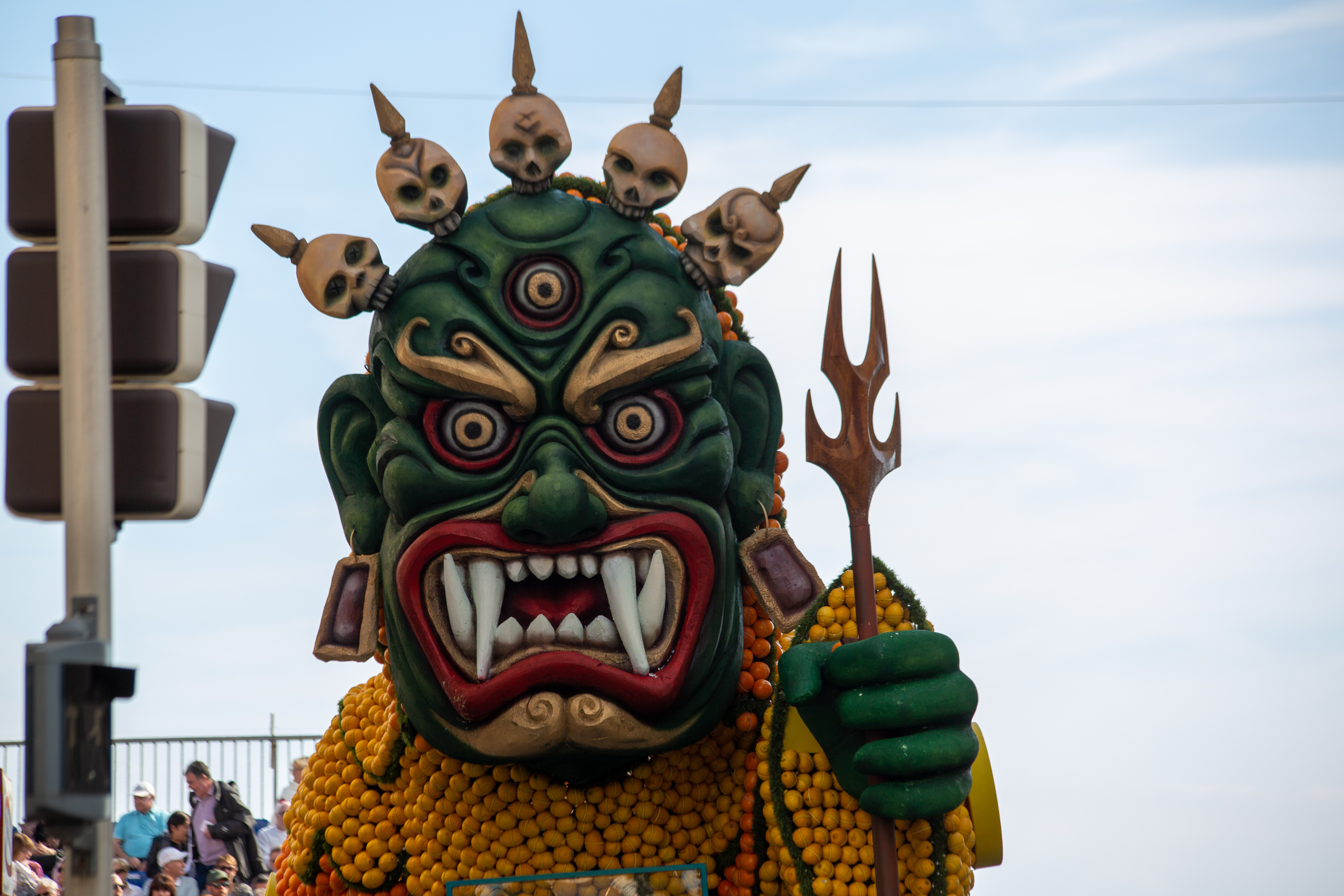
Demon float at the 87th Fête du Citron, 2020

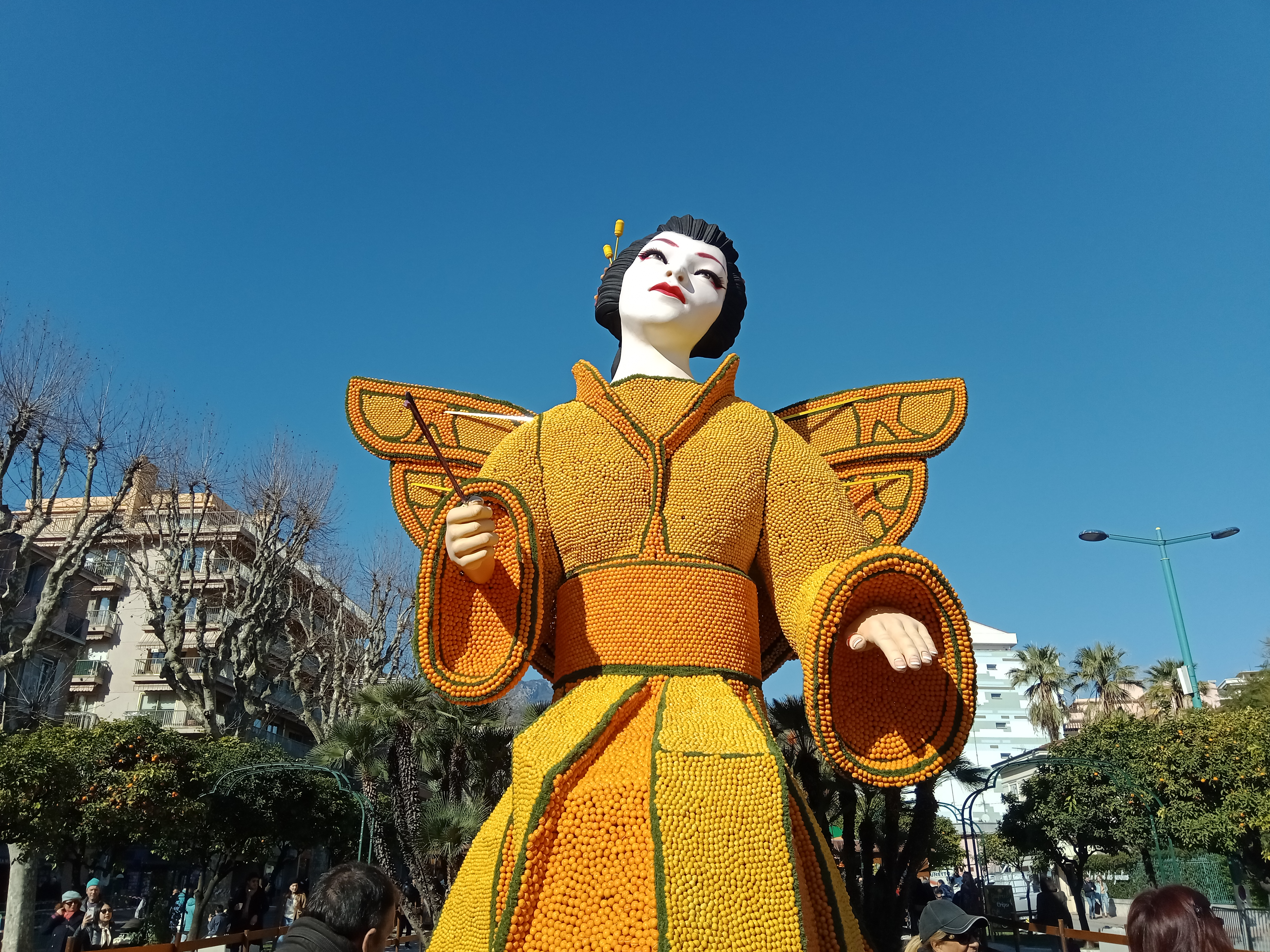
Japanese costume float at the 89th Fête du Citron, 2023

In 1928, Menton was the main producer of lemons on the European continent. A hotelier had the idea of organizing a private exhibition of flowers and citrus fruits in the gardens of the Riviera Hotel. The event's success was such that the following year, the municipality took up the idea on its own. The name "Fête du Citron" was born in 1934. The Lemon Festival combines traditional carnival events with a celebration of Menton's reputation as Europe's lemon capital. Today, Menton is not known for the quantity of lemons it produces but rather their quality, as they are of a specialty kind sought after by chefs from across the region. The celebration features elaborate themed floats whose structures are covered in citrus fruit, primarily lemons and oranges, a large portion of which is imported from Spain every year. At the end of the event, the fruits are sold at low prices. Each year since 1959, a different theme is chosen for the festival.

Fête du Citron is the second largest public winter event on the French Riviera after the Nice Carnival.

The celebration did not take place during the war years between 1940 and 1946, in 1991 due to the Gulf War, and in 2021 because of the COVID-19 pandemic.

== Previous themes ==
2026	92nd	Wonders of life	14 Feb to 1 Mar
2025	91st	Journey(s) to the stars	15 Feb to 2 Mar
2024	90th	The Olympics from antiquity to the present day	17 Feb to 3 Mar
2023	89th	Rock and opera	11 to 26 Feb
2022	88th	Operas and theater	12 to 27 Feb
2020	87th	World festivals	15 Feb to 3 Mar
2019	86th	Fantastic worlds	16 Feb to 3 Mar
2018	85th	Bollywood	17 Feb to 4 Mar
2017	84th	Broadway	11 Feb to 1 Mar
2016	83rd	Cinecittà	13 Feb to 2 Mar
2015	82nd	The tribulations of a lemon in China	14 Feb to 4 Mar
2014	81st	20,000 Leagues Under the Sea	15 Feb to 5 Mar
2013	80th	Around the World in 80 Days	16 Feb to 6 Mar
2012	79th	Regions of France	17 Feb to 7 Mar
2011	78th	The Great civilizations	18 Feb to 9 Mar
2010	77th	Menton creates cinema	12 Feb to 3 Mar
2009	76th	Music of the world	13 Feb to 4 Mar
2008	75th	Islands of the world	16 Feb to 5 Mar
2007	74th	Menton invites carnivals of the world – guest of honour: India	17 Feb to 7 Mar
2006	73rd	Menton invites carnivals of the world – guest of honour: Brazil	
2005	72nd	Long live Spain	
2004	71st	Walt Disney Studio Park	
2003	70th	Alice in Wonderland	
2002	69th	Pinocchio	31 Jan to 17 Feb
2001	68th	Tales of Mother Goose	8 to 27 Feb
2000	67th	La Fontaine's Fables	11 to 27 Feb
1999	66th	Lucky Luke in Menton	
1998	65th	Tintin in the land of lemons	
1997	64th	Menton-Monaco "A story of princes"	
1996	63rd	Asterix in the land of lemons	
1995	62nd	Disneyland in the land of lemons	
1994	61st	Marine fairies	
1993	60th	Celebrating Europe	
1992	59th	The gallant holidays	
1991	58th	The year of Mozart	
1990	57th	Myths and legends of the Mediterranean	
1989	56th	If I knew the history of France	
1988	55th	Wonders of the world	
1987	54th	Love and passion	
1986	53rd	Stories and legends	
1985	52nd	Cinema	
1984	51st	Lemons without borders	
1983	50th	The lemon-gold wedding	
1982	49th	Jules Verne	
1981	48th	Provence	
1980	47th	No more waste	
1979	46th	Circus	
1978	45th	A walk through the history of Menton	
1977	44th	Lemon in all sauces	
1976	43rd	Lemon makes the fair	
1975	42nd	The Golden Fruit Congress has fun	
1974	41st	Lemon and Chinese	
1973	40th	Trip to the Moon	
1972	39th	What a program	
1971	38th	The lemon and the sea	
1970	37th	Music	
1969	36th	The lemon king of the journey	
1968	35th	The lucky charm	
1967	34th	Signs of the zodiac	
1966	33rd	The 4 seasons	
1965	32nd	Orange and gold waterfalls	
1964	31st	The yé-yé orchestras	
1963	30th	The lemon through the ages	
1962	29th	Love	
1961	28th	Orange and gold symphony	
1960	27th	The small world of our countryside	
1959	26th	Flowers	
