= Fontana Rosa =

Coordinates: 43°47′08″N 7°30′49″E

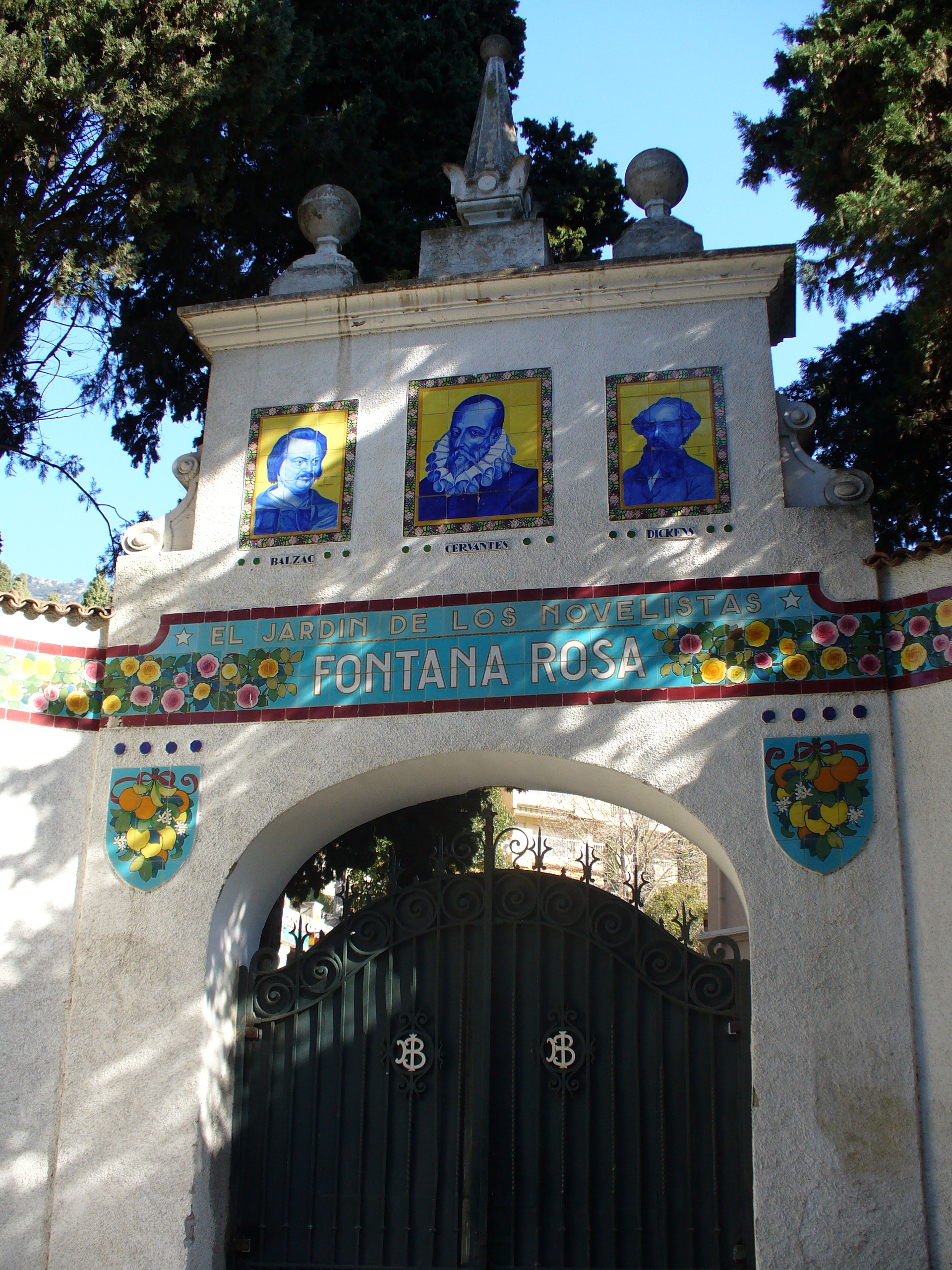
Fontana Rosa (entrance)

Fontana Rosa is a historic garden situated on the Avenue Blasco Ibáñez in Menton, Alpes-Maritimes, on the French Riviera.

The Spanish writer Vicente Blasco Ibáñez (1869–1928) began to build it from 1922 on, and he set up home here with his second wife, Elena, and died there in 1928.

This garden with Spanish and Menton pottery is found in avenue Blasco Ibanez, near Garavan station, and was created a Historical Monument in 1990.

It is also called "Le Jardin des Romanciers" (El Jardín de los Novelistas/The Garden of Novelists), and was frequented by celebrities such as Jean Cocteau. It was the place where Blasco Ibáñez wrote the novel Mare Nostrum (filmed in 1926 as Torrent).

The garden inspired by Andalusian and Arabian-Persian styles contains species such as Ficus macrophylla, Araucaria heterophylla , palm trees, banana trees or scented rosebushes. It is a tribute to Vicente's favourite writers : Cervantes, Dickens, Shakespeare or Honoré de Balzac, whose busts can be found at the entrance and to whom he dedicated several fountains and rotundas.

Its main buildings are a small elevated villa with polychromatic pottery which houses a library and a personal movie projector room, and a main house (Villa Emilia) in the lower part of the property that dates from the 19th century. The architectural complex also has an aquarium, a colonnade, a concrete pergola, pillars, flower vases, ceramic-panelled benches around the main house and a big round, steel pergola covering a long staircase in the middle of the property.

After Blasco Ibáñez's death here, his son inherited the property. In 1939, it was sacked during the war and later abandoned for more than thirty years. Blasco Ibáñez's son gave it to the commune of Menton in 1970. Since 1985, the buildings have been restored and, as from 1991, the pottery too. Still undergoing restoration, the garden may be visited only by guided tour, on Monday and Friday at 10am.

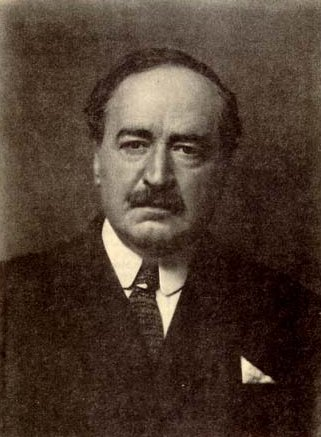
Vicente Blasco Ibáñez
