= Menton-Garavan station =

Railway station in Menton, France

Menton-Garavan
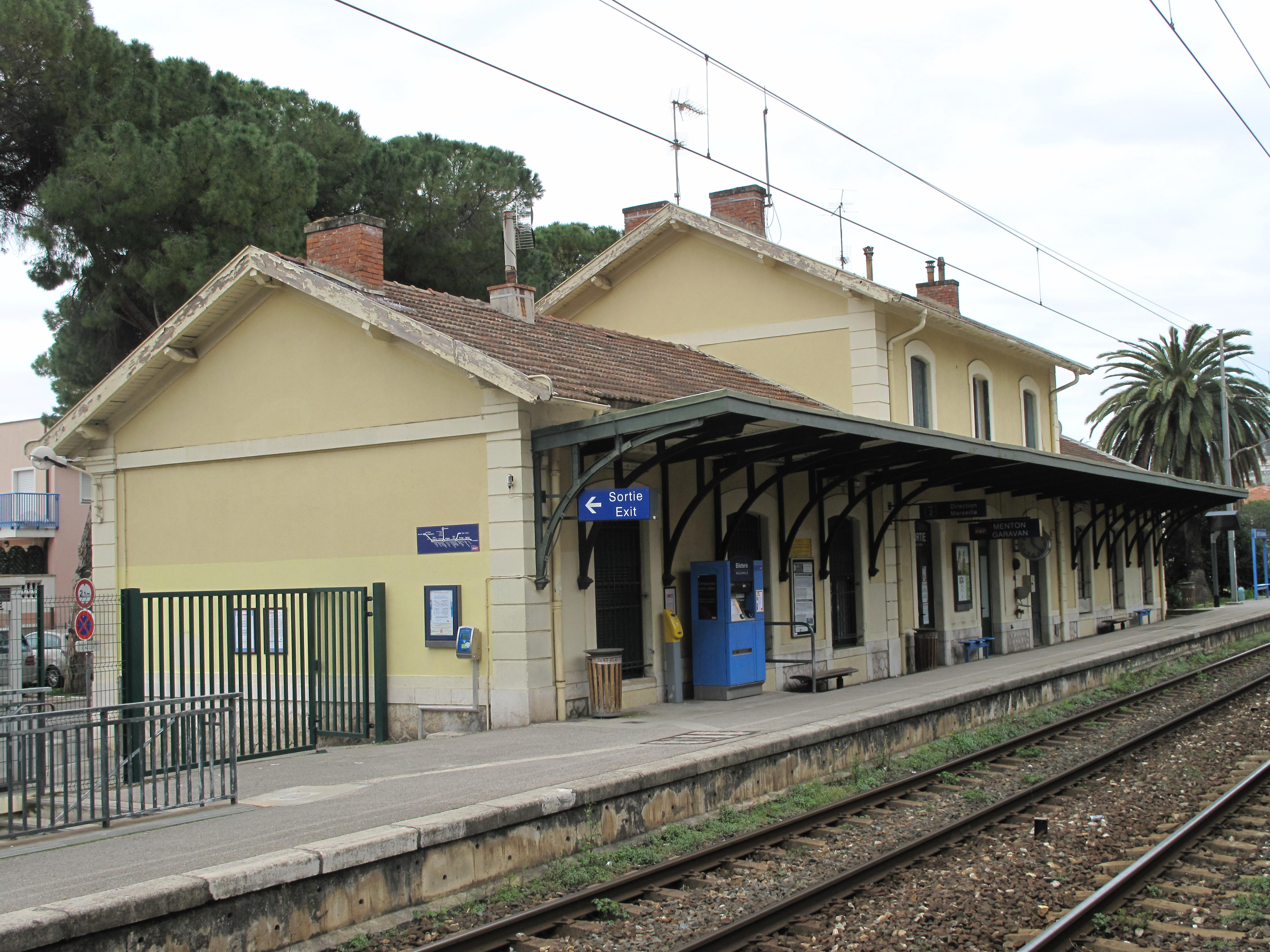
- Menton-Garavan station (Alpes-Maritimes, France)

General information
- Location: Menton, Alpes-Maritimes; Provence-Alpes-Côte d'Azur, France
- Coordinates: 43°47′06″N 7°31′01″E
- Line: Marseille–Ventimiglia railway
- Platforms: 2
- Tracks: 2

Other information
- Station code: 87756494

Services
| Preceding station | TER PACA | Following station |
|---|---|---|
| Menton towards Mandelieu-la-Napoule or Grasse | 4 | Ventimiglia Terminus |
Location

Menton-Garavan is a railway station in Menton, Provence-Alpes-Côte d'Azur, France.

== History ==
The station is located on the Marseille–Ventimiglia railway line. The station is served by TER (local) services operated by SNCF. Trains operate between Cannes and Ventimiglia roughly every 30 mins.

This is the last station before the border with Italy. As a result, during the 2015 influx of refugees in Europe, police executed a search for illegal immigrants on every train arriving from Italy.

== Train services ==
The following services currently call at Menton-Garavan:

- local service (TER Provence-Alpes-Côte-d'Azur) Grasse/Mandelieu - Cannes - Nice - Monaco - Ventimiglia
