= Knights of the Redeemer =

The Knights of the Redeemer were a Roman Catholic secular community, founded in 1608 by Vincenzo I Gonzaga, on the occasion of the marriage of his eldest son Francesco IV Gonzaga with Margaret of Savoy. It was founded in honour of the Blood of Christ, a relic of which has been venerated since time immemorial in the Mantua Cathedral.

The emblems of the order consisted of a red silk robe and a golden necklace with a medal on which were figured three drops of blood in a monstrance.

The duke was invested with these insignia by his son, Ferdinando Gonzaga, and with the approbation of Pope Paul V proclaimed grand master of the order, a dignity inherited by his successors in the duchy.

The duke in turn distributed the same insignia to fourteen knights chosen from the highest nobility of Mantua and the neighbouring states. The statutes of the order obliged the members to devote themselves to the defence of the Catholic religion, the Holy See and their sovereign.

This order lasted only a century. It disappeared when the last of its dukes, Ferdinand Charles, having died childless, the Emperor Joseph I in 1708 merged the duchy into his hereditary estates.
