= List of SNCF stations in Provence-Alpes-Côte d'Azur =

This article contains a list of current SNCF railway stations in the Provence-Alpes-Côte d'Azur region of France.

== Alpes-de-Haute-Provence (04) ==
- La Brillane-Oraison
- Château-Arnoux-Saint-Auban
- Manosque-Gréoux-les-Bains
- Sisteron

== Alpes-Maritimes (06) ==
- Antibes
- L'Ariane-la-Trinité
- Beaulieu-sur-Mer
- Biot
- Le Bosquet
- Breil-sur-Roya
- La Brigue
- Cagnes-sur-Mer
- Cannes
- Cannes-la-Bocca
- Cap-d'Ail
- Cap-Martin-Roquebrune
- Carnolès
- Cros-de-Cagnes
- Drap-Cantaron
- L'Escarène
- Èze-sur-Mer
- La Frayère
- Fontan-Saorge
- Golfe-Juan-Vallauris
- Grasse
- Juan-les-Pins
- Mandelieu-la-Napoule
- Menton
- Menton-Garavan
- Monaco-Monte-Carlo (also located in Monaco)
- Monte-Carlo-Country-Club
- Mouans-Sartoux
- Nice CP (private railway, not SNCF)
- Nice-Pont-Michel
- Nice-Riquier
- Nice-Saint-Augustin
- Nice-Ville
- Peille
- Peillon-Sainte-Thècle
- Ranguin
- Saint-Dalmas-de-Tende
- Saint-Laurent-du-Var
- Sospel
- Tende
- Théoule-sur-Mer
- Touët-de-l'Escarene
- Le Trayas
- La Trinité-Victor
- Viévola
- Villefranche-sur-Mer
- Villeneuve-Loubet-Plage

== Bouches-du-Rhône (13) ==
- Aix-en-Provence TGV
- Aix-en-Provence
- Arenc-Euroméditerranée
- Arles
- Aubagne
- La Barasse
- Carry-le-Rouet
- Cassis
- La Ciotat
- La Couronne-Carro
- Croix-Sainte
- L'Estaque
- Fos-sur-Mer
- Gardanne
- Istres
- Lamanon
- Marseille-Blancarde
- Marseille-Saint-Charles
- Martigues
- Meyrargues
- Miramas
- Niolon
- Orgon
- Pas-des-Lanciers
- La Penne-sur-Huveaune
- Picon-Busserine
- La Pomme
- Port-de-Bouc
- Rassuen
- La Redonne-Ensuès
- Rognac
- Saint-Antoine
- Saint-Chamas
- Sainte-Marthe-en-Provence
- Saint-Joseph-le-Castellas
- Saint-Marcel
- Saint-Martin-de-Crau
- Salon
- Sausset-les-Pins
- Sénas
- Septèmes
- Simiane
- Tarascon
- Vitrolles-Aéroport-Marseille-Provence

== Hautes-Alpes (05) ==
- L'Argentière-les-Ecrins
- Aspres-sur-Buëch
- Briançon
- Chorges
- Embrun
- Gap
- Laragne
- Mont-Dauphin-Guillestre
- Serres
- Veynes-Dévoluy

== Var (83) ==
- Agay
- Anthéor-Cap-Roux
- Les Arcs–Draguignan
- Bandol
- Boulouris-sur-Mer
- Carnoules
- La Crau
- Cuers-Pierrefeu
- Le Dramont
- Fréjus
- La Garde
- Gonfaron
- Hyères
- Le Luc et Le Cannet
- Ollioules-Sanary-sur-Mer
- La Pauline-Hyères
- Pignans
- Puget-Ville
- Saint-Cyr-Les Lecques-La Cadière
- Saint-Raphaël-Valescure
- La Seyne–Six-Fours
- Solliès-Pont
- Toulon
- Le Trayas
- Vidauban

== Vaucluse (84) ==
- Avignon-Centre
- Avignon TGV
- Bédarrides
- Bollène-La Croisière
- Carpentras
- Cavaillon
- Courthézon
- Entraigues-sur-la-Sorgue
- Gadagne
- L'Isle-sur-la-Sorgue-Fontaine-de-Vaucluse
- Monteux
- Montfavet
- Morières-lès-Avignon
- Orange
- Pertuis
- Saint-Saturnin-d'Avignon
- Sorgues-Châteauneuf-du-Pape
- Le Thor

== See also ==
- SNCF
- List of SNCF stations for SNCF stations in other regions
