= Golfe-Juan-Vallauris station =

Railway station in Vallauris, France

Golfe-Juan-Vallauris
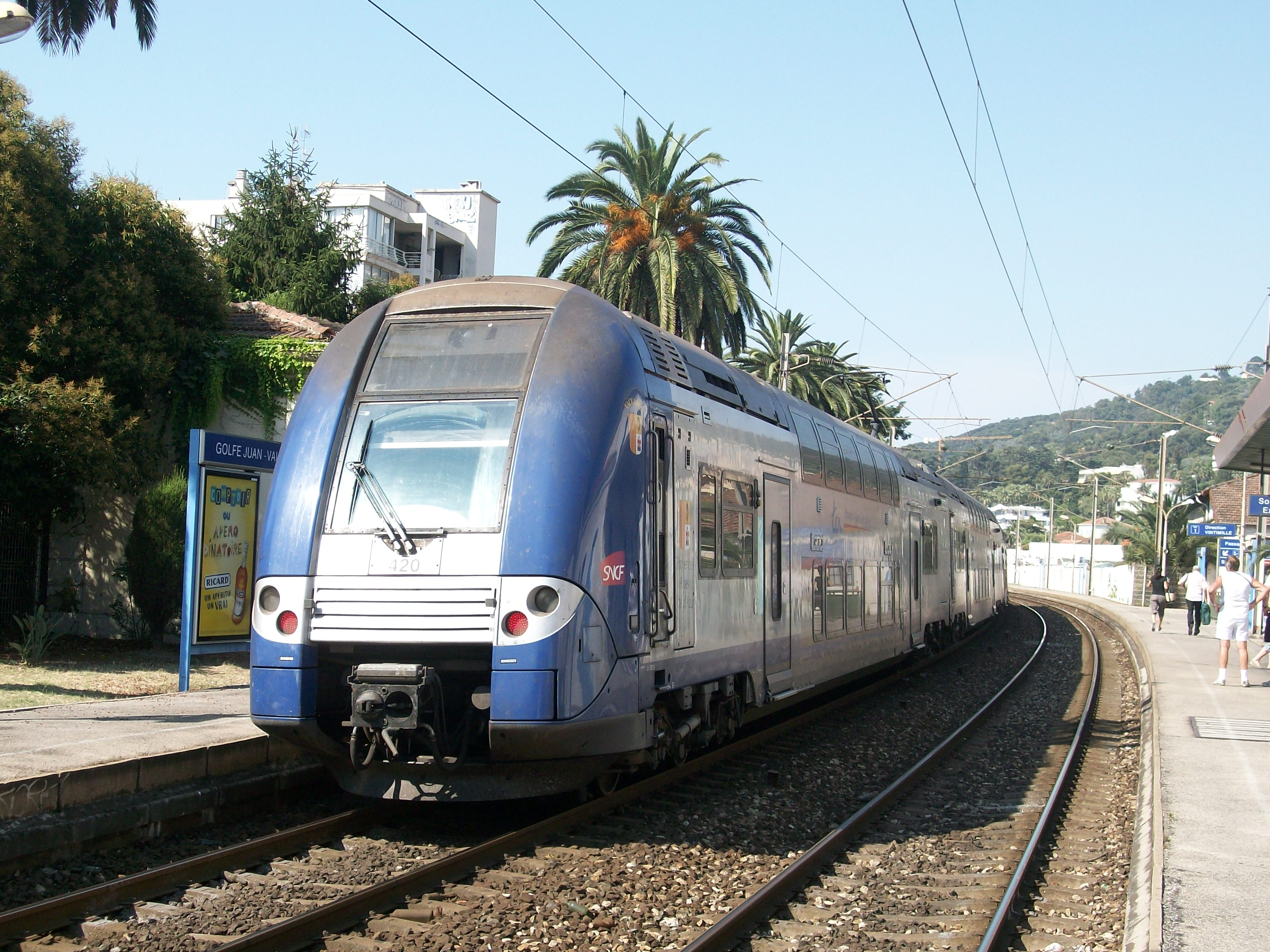
- Golfe-Juan-Vallauris station (Alpes-Maritimes, France)

General information
- Location: Vallauris, Alpes-Maritimes; Provence-Alpes-Côte d'Azur, France
- Coordinates: 43°33′58″N 7°4′22″E
- Operator: SNCF
- Platforms: 2
- Tracks: 2
- Train operators: TER

Other information
- Station code: 87757641

Services
Preceding station	TER PACA	Following station
Cannes towards Mandelieu-la-Napoule or Grasse	4	Juan-les-Pins towards Ventimiglia
Location

Golfe-Juan-Vallauris is a railway station serving Vallauris, Alpes-Maritimes department, southeastern France. It is situated on the Marseille–Ventimiglia railway, between Cannes and Nice. The station is served by regional trains (TER Provence-Alpes-Côte d'Azur) to Cannes, Grasse, Antibes and Nice.
