= La Seyne–Six-Fours station =

Railway station in La Seyne-sur-Mer, France

Coordinates: 43°7′1″N 5°52′37″E

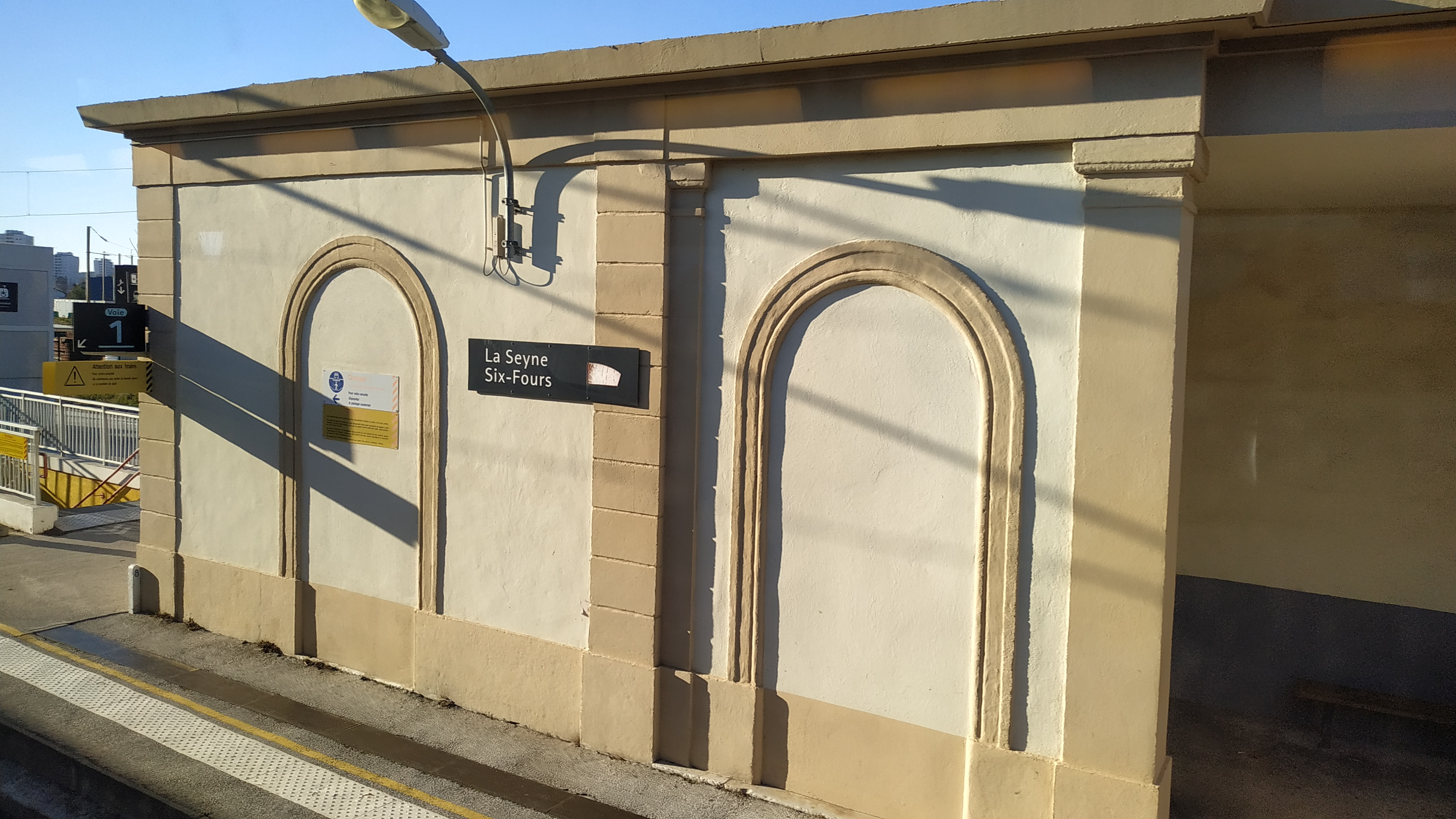
La Seyne-Six-Fours Station

La Seyne–Six-Fours station (French: Gare de La Seyne–Six-Fours) is a railway station serving the town La Seyne-sur-Mer, Var department, southeastern France. It is situated on the Marseille–Ventimiglia railway. The station is served by regional trains (TER Provence-Alpes-Côte d'Azur) to Marseille and Toulon. –

Preceding station	TER PACA	Following station
Ollioules-Sanary towards Marseille	1	Toulon towards Hyères

== See also ==
- List of SNCF stations in Provence-Alpes-Côte d'Azur
