= Antibes station =

French railway station

Antibes
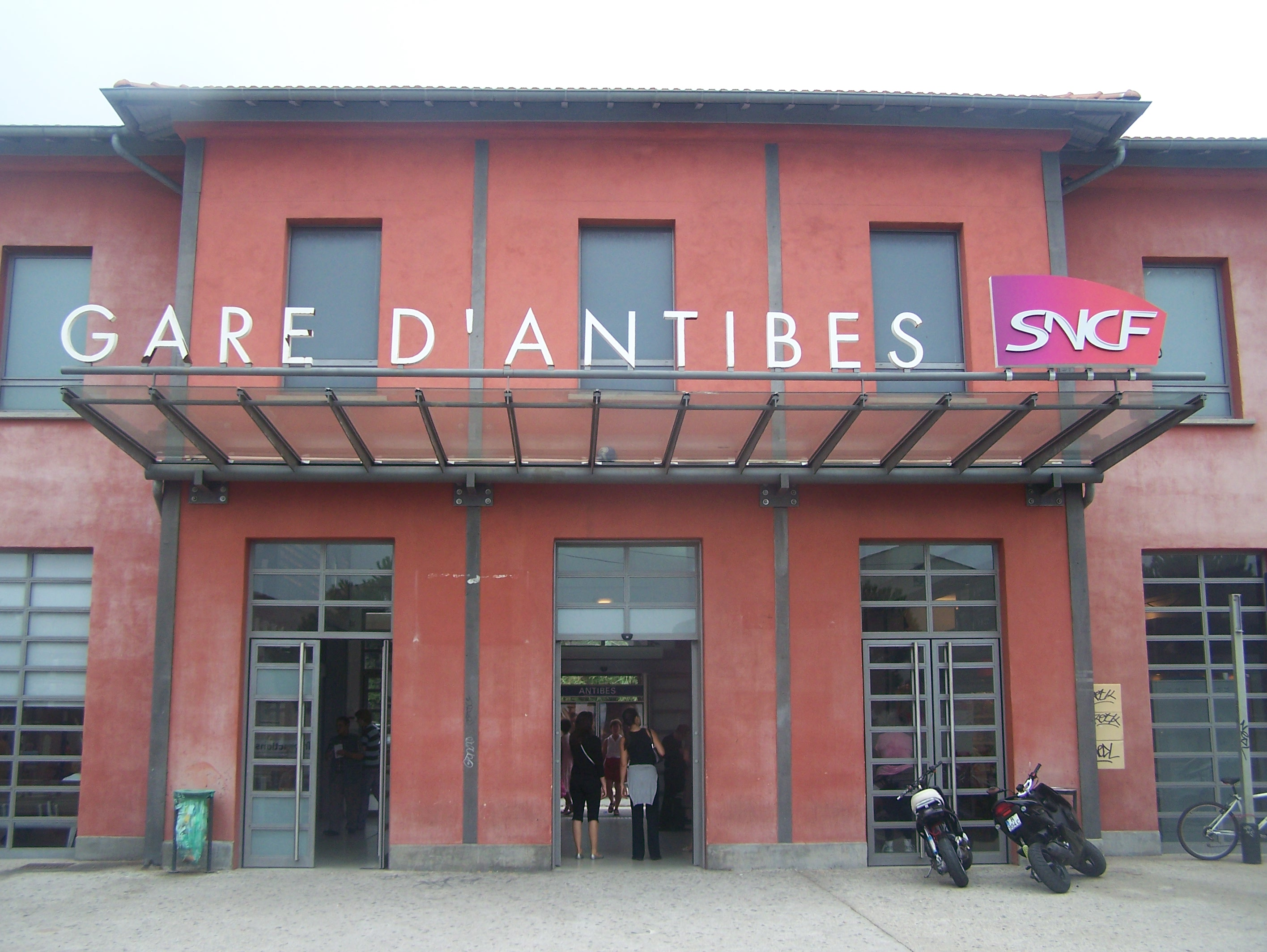
- Antibes railway station

General information
- Location: Place Pierre-Semard; 06600 Antibes; Alpes-Maritimes; France
- Coordinates: 43°35′9″N 7°7′10″E
- Owner: SNCF
- Operator: SNCF
- Line: Marseille–Ventimiglia railway
- Platforms: 3
- Tracks: 3

Other information
- Station code: 87757674

Passengers
- 2024: 3,414,872
Services
Preceding station	SNCF	Following station
Cannes towards Paris-Lyon	TGV inOui	Nice-Ville Terminus
Cannes towards Lyon-Part-Dieu	TGV inOui	Nice-Ville Terminus
Cannes towards Nancy-Ville	TGV inOui	Nice-Ville Terminus
Cannes towards Paris-Lyon	TGV inOui Seasonal service	Nice-Ville towards Menton
Cannes towards Paris-Austerlitz	Intercités (night)	Nice-Ville Terminus
Preceding station	Ouigo	Following station
Cannes towards Paris-Lyon	Grande Vitesse	Nice Terminus
Preceding station	TER PACA	Following station
Juan-les-Pins towards Les Arcs–Draguignan	3	Cagnes-sur-Mer towards Nice
Juan-les-Pins towards Mandelieu-la-Napoule or Grasse	4	Biot towards Ventimiglia
Cannes towards Marseille	6	Nice-Saint-Augustin towards Nice
Location

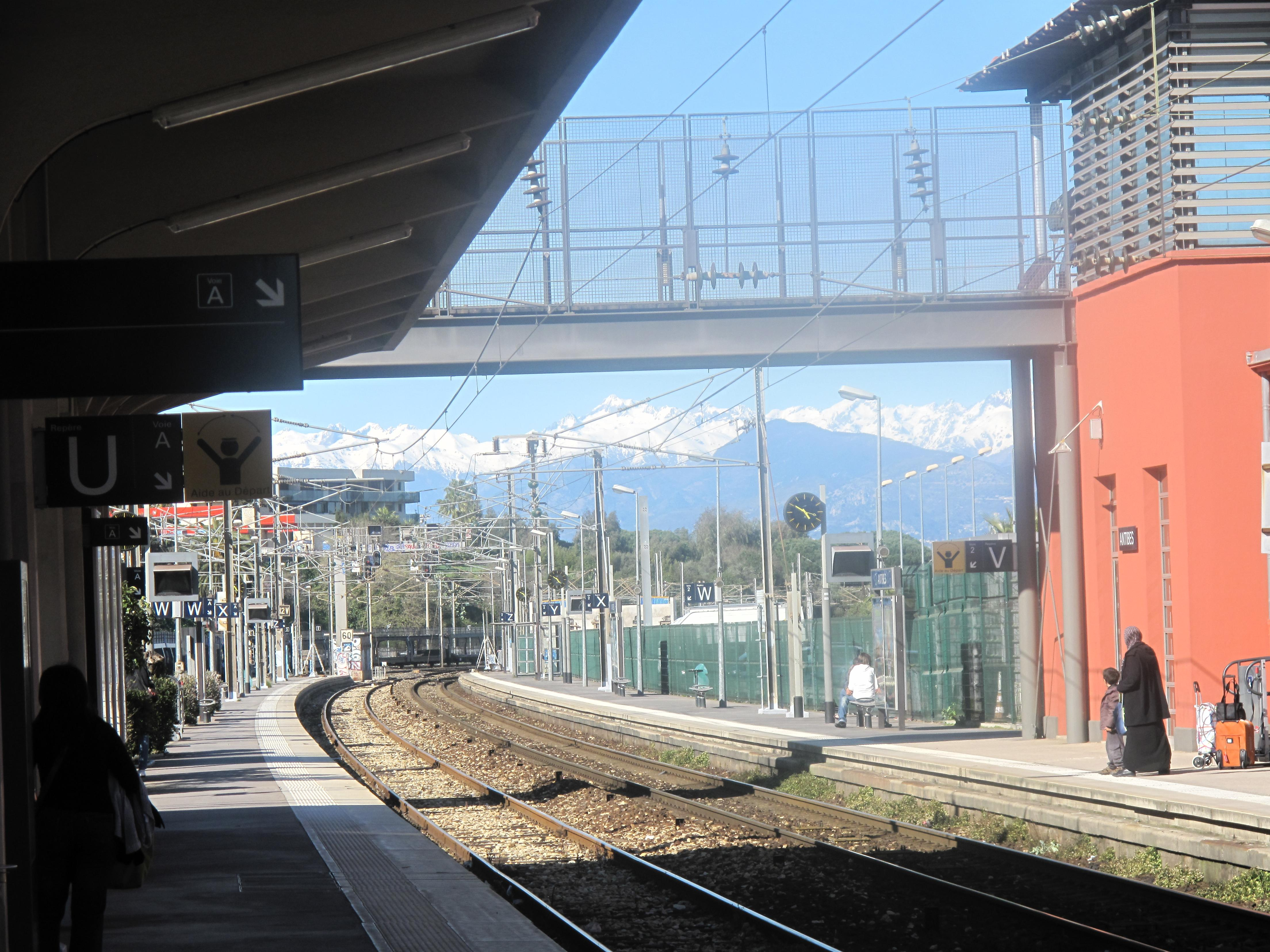
View of the platforms

Antibes station (French: Gare d'Antibes) is a railway station located in Antibes, Alpes-Maritimes, southern France. The station is located on the Marseille–Ventimiglia railway. The train services are operated by SNCF.

== Train services ==
The following services currently call at the station:

- High speed services (TGV) Paris - (Marseille) - Cannes - Nice (- Monaco - Menton)
- High speed services (TGV) Lyon - Avignon - Marseille - Cannes - Nice
- Regional services (TER Provence-Alpes-Côte d'Azur) Marseille - Toulon - Cannes - Nice
- Local services (TER Provence-Alpes-Côte d'Azur) Cannes - Antibes - Nice - Monaco - Menton - Ventimiglia
- Local services (TER Provence-Alpes-Côte d'Azur) Grasse - Cannes - Antibes - Nice - Monaco - Menton - Ventimiglia

Please notice that this station, even served by TGV cars, is NOT high speed as the specific track, needed for high speed up to 320km/h goes only to Marseilles St Charles station. All trains from Marseille to the Italian border (Menton) run at slow speed.

== See also ==
- List of SNCF stations in Provence-Alpes-Côte d'Azur
