= Toulon station =

Railway station in Toulon, France

Toulon
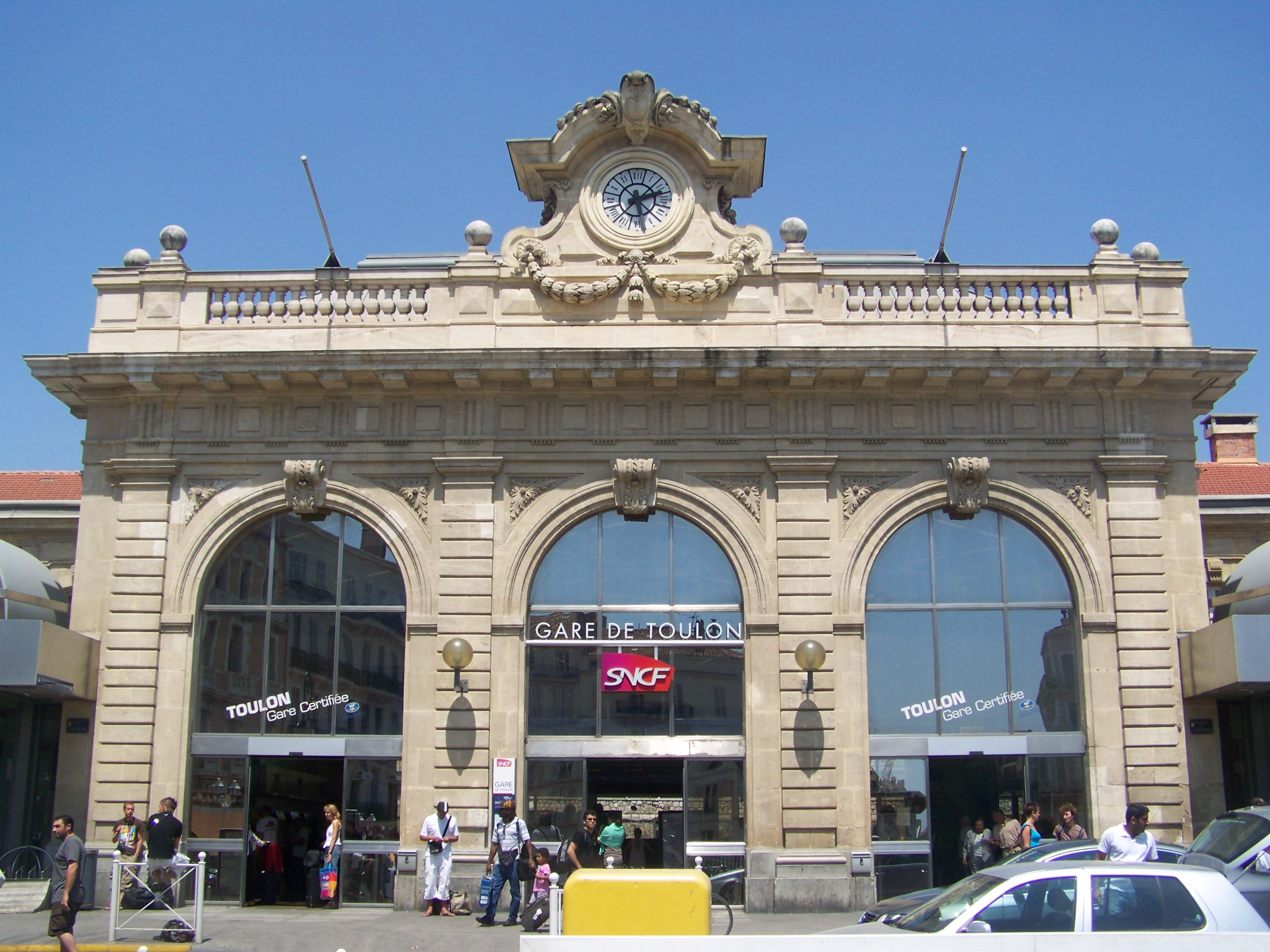

General information
- Location: Toulon
- Coordinates: 43°7′43″N 5°55′47″E
- Owner: SNCF
- Operator: SNCF
- Lines: TER, Corail
- Platforms: 2
- Tracks: 3

Other information
- Station code: IATA: XZV

Passengers
- 2024: 5,243,022
Services
| Preceding station | SNCF | Following station |
|---|---|---|
| Avignon TGV towards Paris-Lyon | TGV inOui | Les Arcs–Draguignan towards Nice-Ville |
| Marseille towards Paris-Lyon | TGV inOui | Hyères Terminus |
| Marseille towards Nancy-Ville | TGV inOui | Les Arcs–Draguignan towards Nice-Ville |
| Marseille towards Paris-Lyon | TGV inOui Seasonal service | Saint-Raphaël-Valescure towards Menton |
| Marseille-Blancarde towards Paris-Austerlitz | Intercités (night) | Les Arcs–Draguignan towards Nice-Ville |
| Preceding station | Ouigo | Following station |
| Aix-en-Provence TGV towards Paris-Lyon | Grande Vitesse | Les Arcs–Draguignan towards Nice |
| Preceding station | TER PACA | Following station |
| La Seyne–Six-Fours towards Marseille | 1 | La Garde towards Hyères |
| Terminus | 2 | La Garde towards Les Arcs–Draguignan |
| Marseille Terminus | 6 | Carnoules towards Nice |
Location

Toulon station (French: Gare de Toulon) is a French railway station serving the city Toulon, Var department, southeastern France. It is situated on the Marseille–Ventimiglia railway.

== Train services ==
The station is served by the following services:

- High speed services (TGV) Paris - Avignon - Aix-en-Provence - Cannes - Antibes - Nice
- High speed services (TGV) Bruxelles - Lille - Airport Charles de Gaulle - Lyon - Avignon - Aix-en-Provence - Marseille - Cannes - Nice
- High speed services (TGV) Nancy - Strasbourg - Besançon - Dijon - Lyon - Avignon - Marseille - Cannes - Nice
- High speed services (TGV) Lyon - Marseille - Nice
- Night services Paris - Marseille - Nice
- Local services Marseille - Aubagne - Saint-Cyr-sur-Mer - Toulon

Please notice that Toulon, even served by TGV cars, is NOT high speed as the specific track, needed for high speed up to 320km/h goes only to Marseilles St Charles station. All trains from Marseille to the Italian border (Menton) run at slow speed.

== See also ==
- List of SNCF stations in Provence-Alpes-Côte d'Azur
