= Juan-les-Pins station =

Railway station in the southeast of France

Coordinates: 43°33′58″N 7°4′22″E

Juan-les-Pins
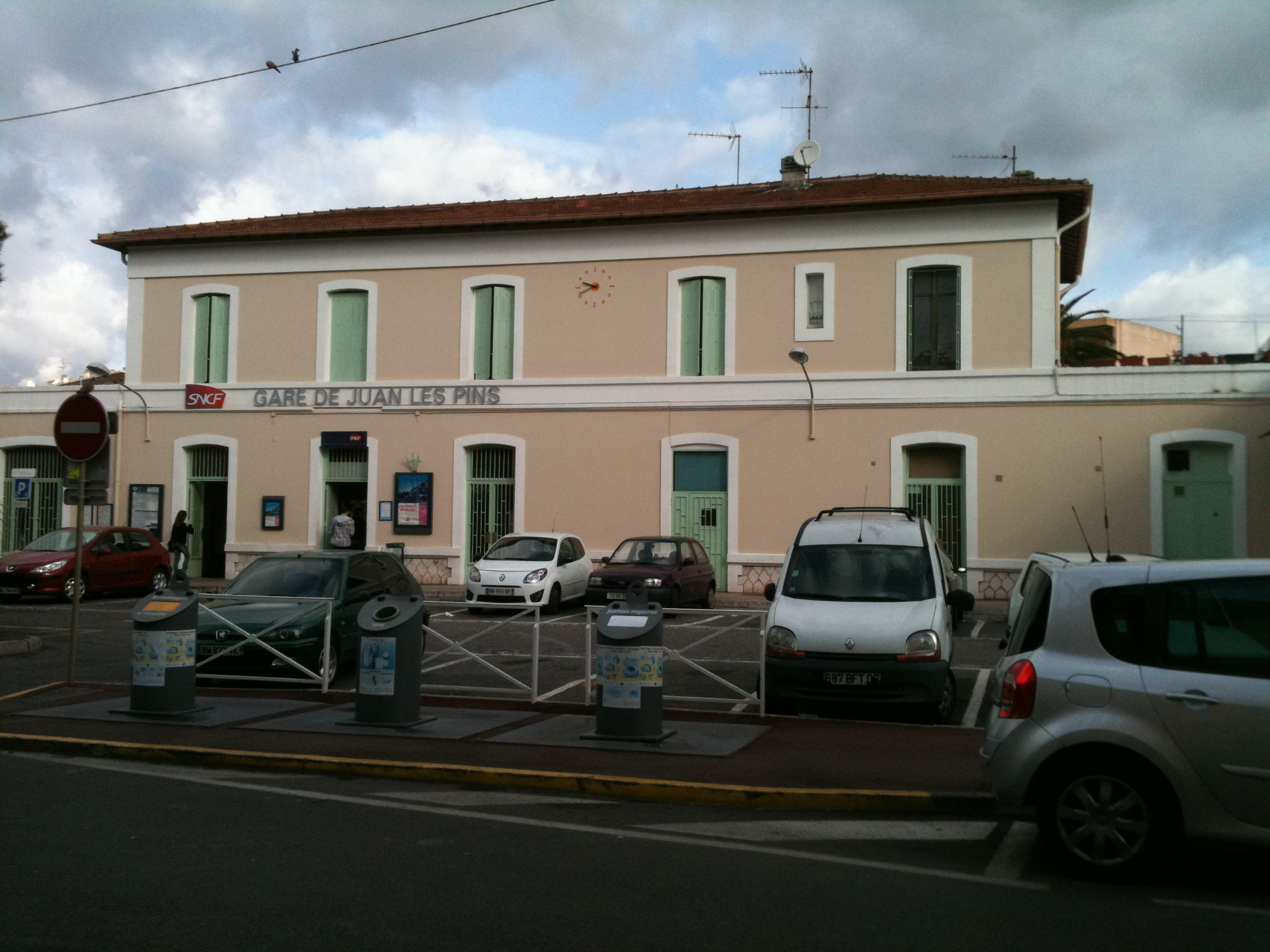
- Exterior of Juan-les-Pins station in 2012

General information
- Location: Avenue de l'Esterel; 06160 Antibes; Alpes-Maritimes, France
- Elevation: 10 m (33 ft)
- Owner: SNCF
- Operator: SNCF
- Line: Marseille–Ventimiglia railway
- Distance: 202.318 km
- Platforms: 2
- Tracks: 2

Other information
- Station code: 87757666

Passengers
- 2024: 1,072,078

Services
Preceding station	TER PACA	Following station
Cannes towards Les Arcs–Draguignan	3	Antibes towards Nice
Golfe-Juan-Vallauris towards Mandelieu-la-Napoule or Grasse	4	Antibes towards Ventimiglia
Location

Juan-les-Pins station (French: Gare de Juan-les-Pins) is a railway station serving the town of Juan-les-Pins, part of the commune of Antibes, in the Alpes-Maritimes department, southeastern France. It is situated on the Marseille–Ventimiglia railway, between Cannes and Nice. Trains pass through this station between 5am and 1am daily. The station is served by regional trains (TER Provence-Alpes-Côte d'Azur) to Cannes, Grasse, Antibes and Nice.
