= Saint-Raphaël-Valescure station =

Railway station in Saint-Raphaël, France

Coordinates: 43°25′22″N 6°46′14″E

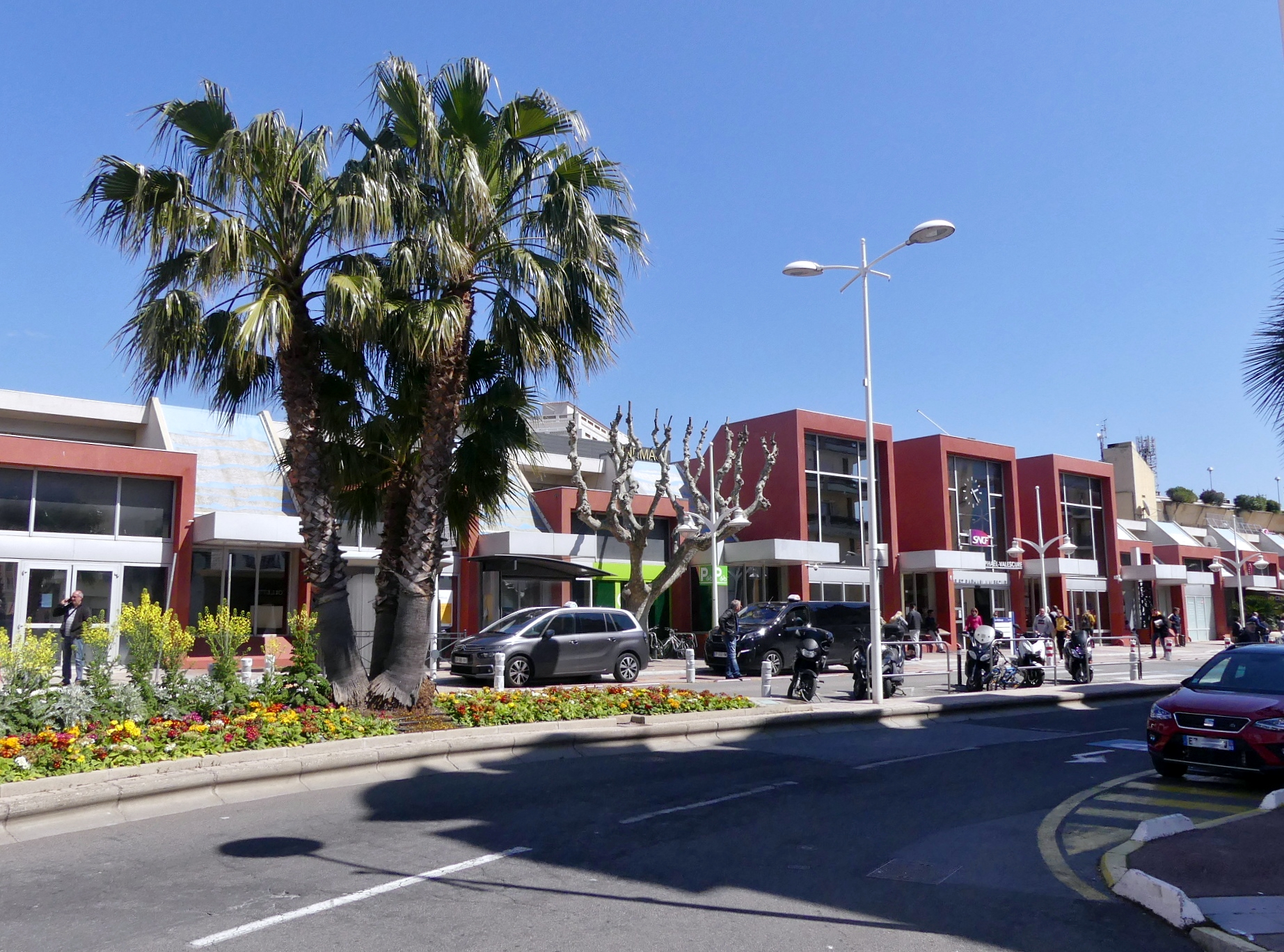
Entrance in 2019

Saint-Raphaël-Valescure station is a railway station serving the town Saint-Raphaël, Var department, southeastern France. It is situated on the Marseille–Ventimiglia railway. The station is served by high speed trains to Paris, Nancy and Nice, and regional trains (TER Provence-Alpes-Côte d'Azur) to Nice, Marseille and Toulon.

Preceding station	SNCF	Following station
Les Arcs–Draguignan towards Paris-Lyon	TGV inOui	Cannes towards Nice-Ville
Les Arcs–Draguignan towards Nancy-Ville	TGV inOui	Cannes towards Nice-Ville
Les Arcs–Draguignan towards Paris-Austerlitz	Intercités (night)	Cannes towards Nice-Ville
Preceding station	Ouigo	Following station
Les Arcs–Draguignan towards Paris-Lyon	Grande Vitesse	Cannes towards Nice
Preceding station	TER PACA	Following station
Fréjus towards Les Arcs–Draguignan	3	Boulouris-sur-Mer towards Nice
Fréjus towards Marseille	6	Cannes towards Nice

Please notice that this station, even served by TGV trains, is NOT high speed as the specific track, needed for high speed up to 320 km/h goes only to Marseilles St Charles station. All trains from Marseille to the Italian border (Menton) run at slower speed (max 160 km/h).

== See also ==
- List of SNCF stations in Provence-Alpes-Côte d'Azur
