= Mouans-Sartoux station =

Railway station in Mouans-Sartoux, France

Mouans-Sartoux
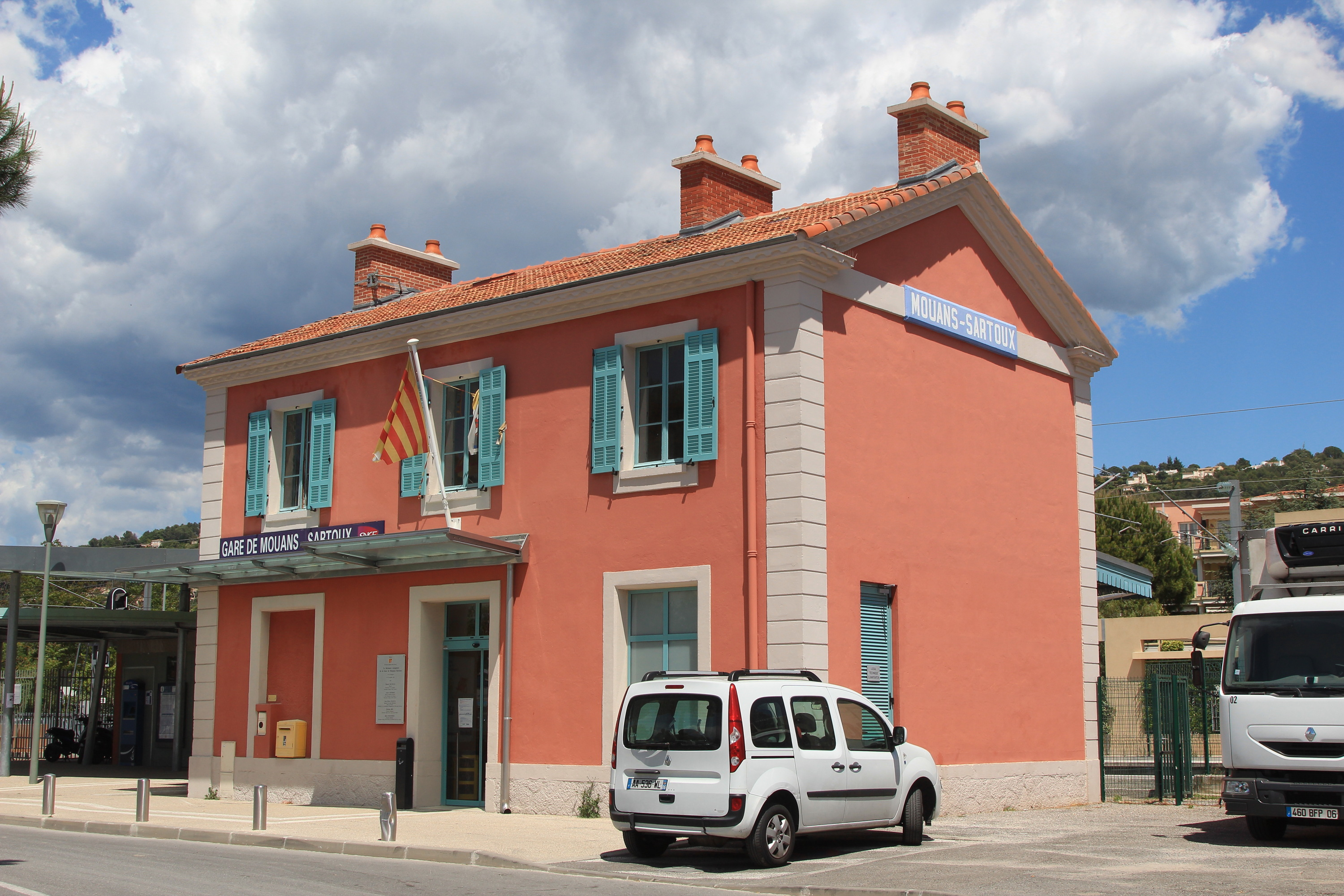
- Mouans-Sartoux station (Alpes-Maritimes, France)

General information
- Location: Mouans-Sartoux, Alpes-Maritimes; Provence-Alpes-Côte d'Azur, France
- Coordinates: 43°37′13″N 6°58′28″E
- Operator: SNCF
- Platforms: 2
- Tracks: 2
- Train operators: TER

Services
Preceding station	TER PACA	Following station
Grasse Terminus	4	Ranguin towards Ventimiglia
Location

Mouans-Sartoux station (French: Gare de Mouans-Sartoux) is a railway station serving Mouans-Sartoux, Alpes-Maritimes department, southeastern France. The station is located on Cannes-la-Bocca to Grasse Railway Line. The station opened in 1871, and was closed after 1938 until it was rebuilt and reopened in 2005.

The station is served by regional trains (TER Provence-Alpes-Côte d'Azur) to Cannes, Antibes and Nice.

== See also ==
- List of SNCF stations in Provence-Alpes-Côte d'Azur
