= Vidauban =

- Commune
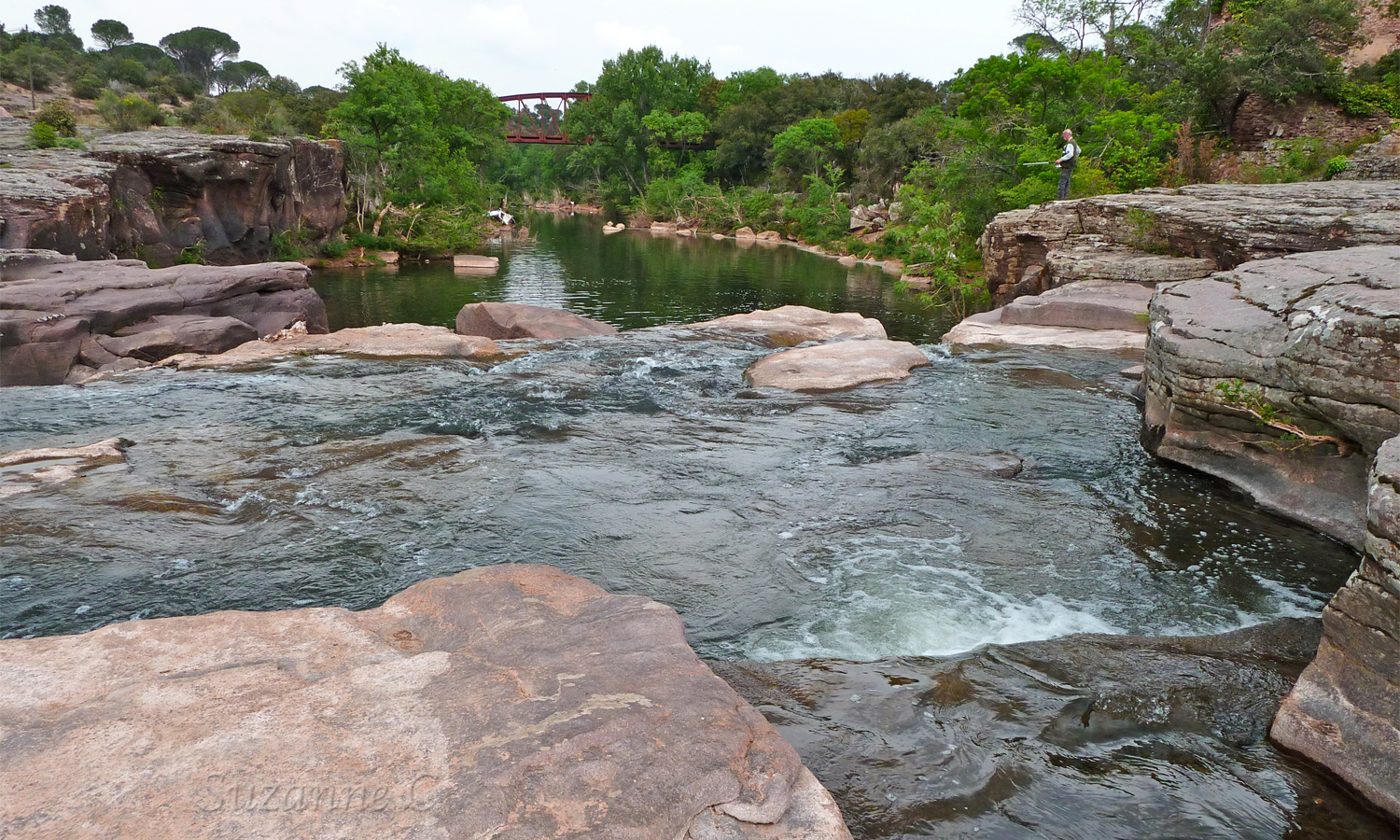
- The River Aille and waterfall, next to the former sawmill, in Vidauban

- Coat of arms
- Location of Vidauban
- Location within France Location within Provence-Alpes-Côte d'Azur
- Coordinates: 43°25′34″N 6°25′57″E
- Country: France
- Region: Provence-Alpes-Côte d'Azur
- Department: Var
- Arrondissement: Draguignan
- Canton: Vidauban
- Intercommunality: CA Dracénie Provence Verdon

Government
  - Mayor (2020–2026): Claude Pianetti
- Area^{1}: 73 km^{2} (28 sq mi)
- Population (2023): 12,608
  - Density: 170/km^{2} (450/sq mi)
- Time zone: UTC+01:00 (CET)
  - Summer (DST): UTC+02:00 (CEST)
- INSEE/Postal code: 83148 /83550
- ^{1} French Land Register data, which excludes lakes, ponds, glaciers > 1 km^{2} (0.386 sq mi or 247 acres) and river estuaries.

Vidauban (French pronunciation: [vidobɑ̃]) is a commune in the Var department in the Provence-Alpes-Côte d'Azur region in southeastern France.

It lies on the bank of the river Argens.

== Geography ==
=== Climate ===
Vidauban has a hot-summer Mediterranean climate (Köppen climate classification Csa). The average annual temperature in Vidauban is 15.6 °C (60.1 °F). The average annual rainfall is 1,008.5 mm (39.70 in) with November as the wettest month. The temperatures are highest on average in July, at around 24.8 °C (76.6 °F), and lowest in January, at around 7.7 °C (45.9 °F). The highest temperature ever recorded in Vidauban was 41.1 °C (106.0 °F) on 28 June 2026; the coldest temperature ever recorded was −7.4 °C (18.7 °F) on 12 February 2012.

Climate data for Vidauban (1991−2020 normals, extremes 2009−present)
Month	Jan	Feb	Mar	Apr	May	Jun	Jul	Aug	Sep	Oct	Nov	Dec	Year
Record high °C (°F)	21.0 (69.8)	24.4 (75.9)	25.2 (77.4)	29.5 (85.1)	35.7 (96.3)	41.1 (106.0)	40.1 (104.2)	40.4 (104.7)	34.7 (94.5)	33.5 (92.3)	24.1 (75.4)	20.0 (68.0)	41.1 (106.0)
Mean daily maximum °C (°F)	11.4 (52.5)	12.5 (54.5)	15.9 (60.6)	19.2 (66.6)	22.5 (72.5)	27.4 (81.3)	30.9 (87.6)	31.0 (87.8)	26.6 (79.9)	21.3 (70.3)	15.5 (59.9)	12.0 (53.6)	20.5 (68.9)
Daily mean °C (°F)	7.7 (45.9)	8.0 (46.4)	11.1 (52.0)	14.1 (57.4)	17.2 (63.0)	21.8 (71.2)	24.8 (76.6)	24.8 (76.6)	21.0 (69.8)	16.6 (61.9)	11.7 (53.1)	8.5 (47.3)	15.6 (60.1)
Mean daily minimum °C (°F)	4.0 (39.2)	3.6 (38.5)	6.3 (43.3)	9.1 (48.4)	11.9 (53.4)	16.1 (61.0)	18.7 (65.7)	18.6 (65.5)	15.5 (59.9)	12.0 (53.6)	8.0 (46.4)	5.0 (41.0)	10.7 (51.3)
Record low °C (°F)	−4.0 (24.8)	−7.4 (18.7)	−2.5 (27.5)	−0.2 (31.6)	4.6 (40.3)	9.4 (48.9)	12.8 (55.0)	12.9 (55.2)	5.8 (42.4)	1.1 (34.0)	−2.5 (27.5)	−5.2 (22.6)	−7.4 (18.7)
Average precipitation mm (inches)	77.7 (3.06)	93.8 (3.69)	84.0 (3.31)	72.7 (2.86)	54.0 (2.13)	67.2 (2.65)	16.1 (0.63)	20.7 (0.81)	58.6 (2.31)	145.1 (5.71)	210.7 (8.30)	107.9 (4.25)	1,008.5 (39.70)
Average precipitation days (≥ 1.0 mm)	5.8	7.2	6.6	6.6	5.7	3.6	1.8	2.7	4.2	6.8	9.3	6.6	66.8
Source: Météo-France

== Population ==
Since the beginning of the 1980s Vidauban has experienced strong population growth. Within 20 years the population has more than doubled.

Historical population
Year	Pop.	±% p.a.
1968	2,757	—
1975	2,930	+0.87%
1982	3,805	+3.80%
1990	5,460	+4.62%
1999	7,311	+3.30%
2007	9,545	+3.39%
2012	10,908	+2.71%
2017	11,907	+1.77%
2023	12,608	+0.96%
Source: INSEE

== See also ==
- Communes of the Var department
