= Les Arcs, Var =

Les Arcs Los Arcs (Occitan)
- Commune
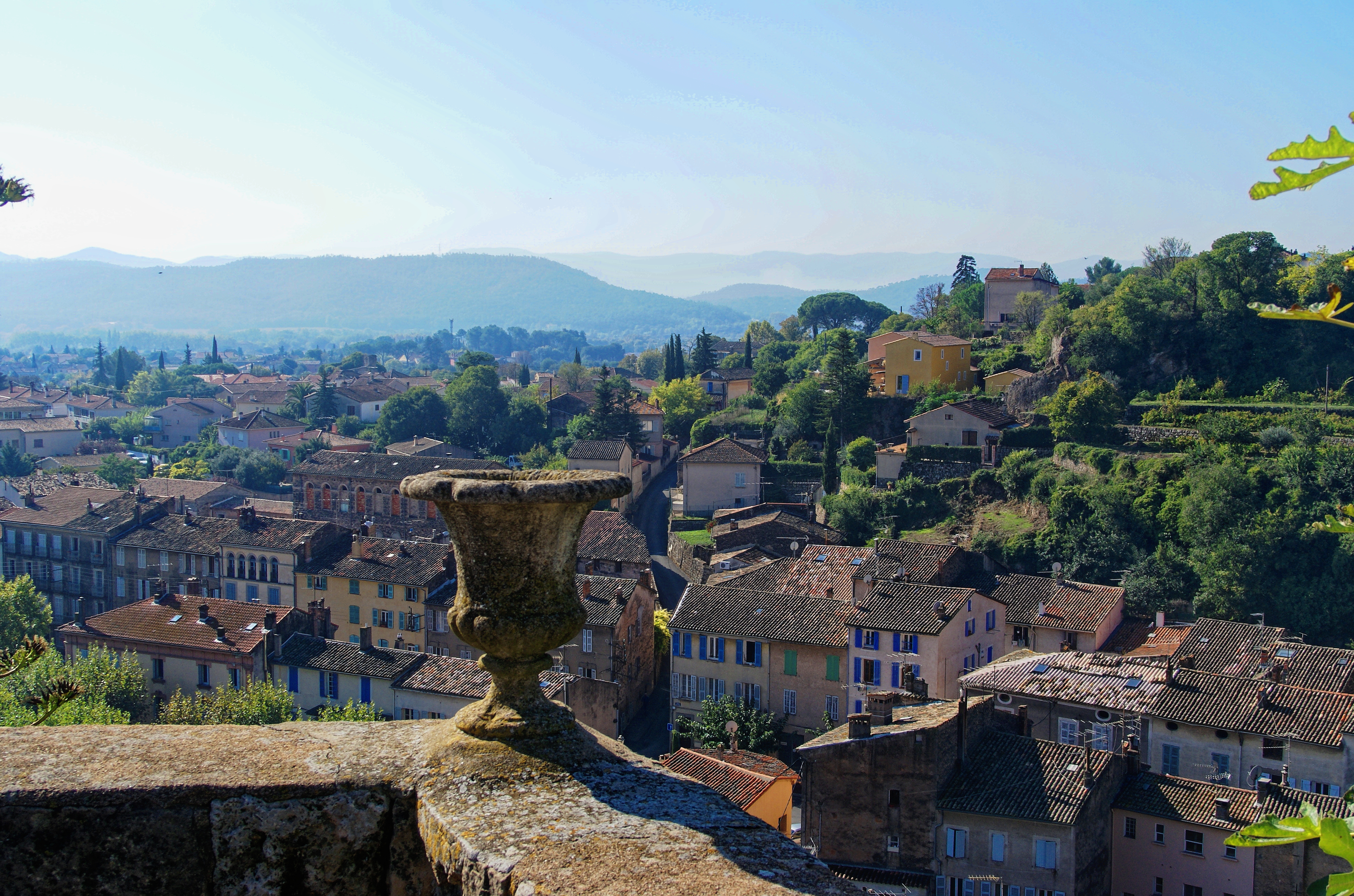
- A view of Les Arcs

- Coat of arms
- Location of Les Arcs
- Location within France Location within Provence-Alpes-Côte d'Azur
- Coordinates: 43°27′48″N 6°28′44″E
- Country: France
- Region: Provence-Alpes-Côte d'Azur
- Department: Var
- Arrondissement: Draguignan
- Canton: Vidauban
- Intercommunality: CA Dracénie Provence Verdon

Government
  - Mayor (2020–2026): Nathalie Gonzales
- Area^{1}: 54.26 km^{2} (20.95 sq mi)
- Highest elevation: 342 m (1,122 ft)
- Lowest elevation: 16 m (52 ft)
- Population (2023): 8,109
  - Density: 149.4/km^{2} (387.1/sq mi)
- Time zone: UTC+01:00 (CET)
  - Summer (DST): UTC+02:00 (CEST)
- INSEE/Postal code: 83004 /83460
- ^{1} French Land Register data, which excludes lakes, ponds, glaciers > 1 km^{2} (0.386 sq mi or 247 acres) and river estuaries.

Les Arcs (French pronunciation: [le.z‿aʁk], also known as Les Arcs-sur-Argens, literally Les Arcs on Argens; Occitan: Los Arcs) is a commune in the Var department in the Provence-Alpes-Côte d'Azur region in Southeastern France.

== Geography ==
Les Arcs is served by Les Arcs–Draguignan station (Gare des Arcs–Draguignan) on the Marseille–Ventimiglia railway. The station, located within the commune of Les Arcs, also serves the greater neighbouring city of Draguignan, as the name suggests.

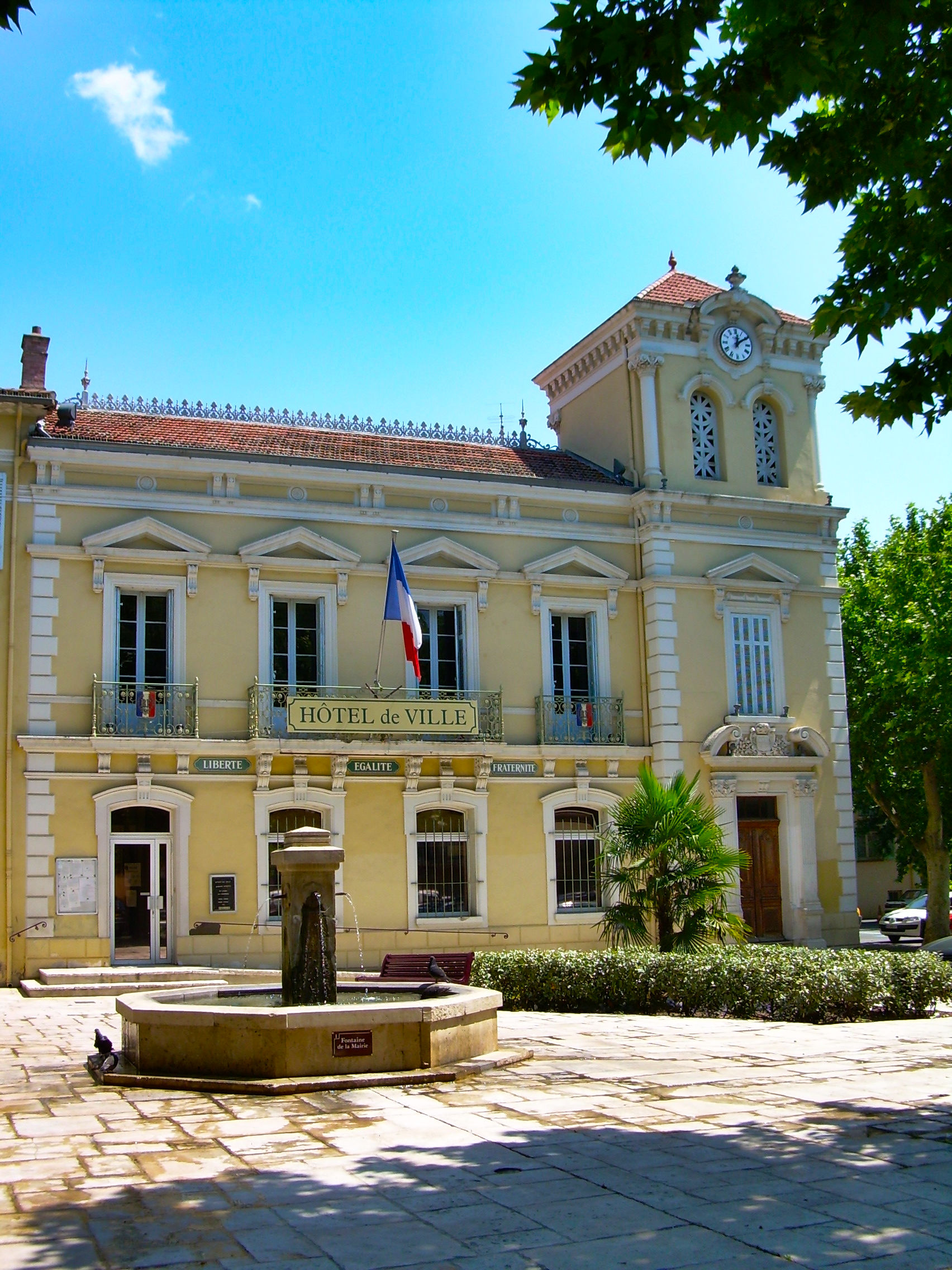
Les Arcs Town Hall

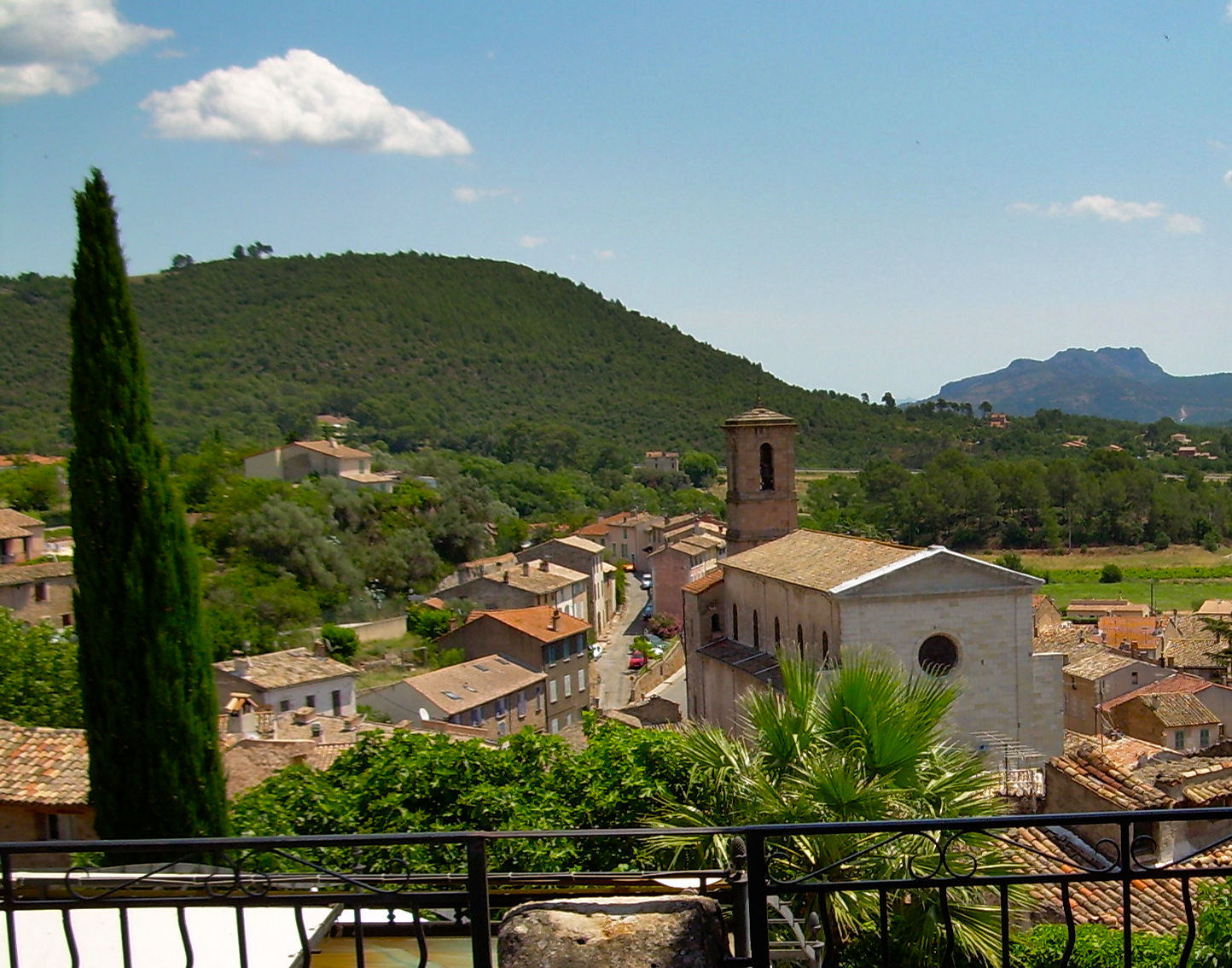
A view of Les Arcs

=== Climate ===
Les Arcs has a hot-summer Mediterranean climate (Köppen climate classification Csa). The average annual temperature in Les Arcs is 15.5 °C (59.9 °F). The average annual rainfall is 803.1 mm (31.62 in) with November as the wettest month. The temperatures are highest on average in July, at around 24.8 °C (76.6 °F), and lowest in January, at around 7.3 °C (45.1 °F). The highest temperature ever recorded in Les Arcs was 41.3 °C (106.3 °F) on 27 June 2019; the coldest temperature ever recorded was −8.7 °C (16.3 °F) on 13 February 1999.

Climate data for Les Arcs (1991−2020 normals, extremes 1997−present)
Month	Jan	Feb	Mar	Apr	May	Jun	Jul	Aug	Sep	Oct	Nov	Dec	Year
Record high °C (°F)	23.1 (73.6)	26.3 (79.3)	28.2 (82.8)	30.8 (87.4)	36.3 (97.3)	41.8 (107.2)	39.7 (103.5)	41.2 (106.2)	37.5 (99.5)	33.9 (93.0)	26.3 (79.3)	22.5 (72.5)	41.8 (107.2)
Mean daily maximum °C (°F)	13.1 (55.6)	14.5 (58.1)	17.8 (64.0)	20.9 (69.6)	25.1 (77.2)	30.0 (86.0)	33.0 (91.4)	33.0 (91.4)	28.2 (82.8)	22.8 (73.0)	16.8 (62.2)	13.3 (55.9)	22.4 (72.3)
Daily mean °C (°F)	7.3 (45.1)	8.1 (46.6)	11.0 (51.8)	14.1 (57.4)	18.0 (64.4)	22.3 (72.1)	24.8 (76.6)	24.7 (76.5)	20.6 (69.1)	16.5 (61.7)	11.2 (52.2)	7.9 (46.2)	15.5 (59.9)
Mean daily minimum °C (°F)	1.6 (34.9)	1.7 (35.1)	4.1 (39.4)	7.2 (45.0)	11.0 (51.8)	14.5 (58.1)	16.7 (62.1)	16.4 (61.5)	13.1 (55.6)	10.1 (50.2)	5.7 (42.3)	2.5 (36.5)	8.7 (47.7)
Record low °C (°F)	−8.2 (17.2)	−8.7 (16.3)	−8.2 (17.2)	−2.8 (27.0)	3.1 (37.6)	4.1 (39.4)	8.7 (47.7)	8.9 (48.0)	4.2 (39.6)	−2.2 (28.0)	−8.1 (17.4)	−8.6 (16.5)	−8.7 (16.3)
Average precipitation mm (inches)	61.9 (2.44)	52.8 (2.08)	52.5 (2.07)	66.4 (2.61)	56.8 (2.24)	57.7 (2.27)	16.4 (0.65)	32.7 (1.29)	62.9 (2.48)	117.0 (4.61)	146.6 (5.77)	79.4 (3.13)	803.1 (31.62)
Average precipitation days (≥ 1.0 mm)	5.6	5.4	5.8	6.7	5.6	3.5	1.9	2.9	4.6	6.6	8.3	6.1	63.0
Source: Météo-France

== Population ==
Historical population
Year	Pop.	±% p.a.
1968	3,324	—
1975	3,324	+0.00%
1982	3,786	+1.88%
1990	4,744	+2.86%
1999	5,334	+1.31%
2007	6,217	+1.93%
2012	6,971	+2.32%
2017	7,064	+0.27%
2023	8,109	+2.33%
Source: INSEE

== See also ==
- Communes of the Var department
