= Canton of Vidauban =

Coordinates: 43.43°N 6.43°E

The canton of Vidauban is an administrative division of the Var department, southeastern France. It was created at the French canton reorganisation which came into effect in March 2015. Its seat is in Vidauban.

It consists of the following communes:

1. Les Arcs
2. Lorgues
3. Le Muy
4. Taradeau
5. Vidauban
