= Grasse Funicular =

French funicular line

Coordinates: 43.6535°N 6.9253°E

Overview
- Native name: Funiculaire de Grasse
- Locale: Grasse, Alpes-Maritimes, France
- Stations: 3

Service
- Type: Funicular

History
- Opened: 1909
- Closed: 1938
- Reopened: TBD

The Grasse Funicular was a funicular line that previously connected the town of Grasse, France, with its railway station.

The town centre of Grasse is perched on a hillside approximately 300 m (980 ft) above sea level and 75 m (246 ft) above the town's railway station with service from Cannes. The railway station opened in 1871 and a funicular to connect Grasse's town centre and station was completed in 1909. In 1938, the Cannes-la-Bocca to Grasse Railway Line suspended passenger service resulting in the closure of the railway station and the funicular which was subsequently dismantled. In 2005, passenger service resumed to a rebuilt Grasse Railway Station.

Since the reopening of the railway station, there have been discussions on the potential reopening of the Grasse Funicular. A proposal announced in 2010 would have seen a new funicular line constructed by 2013 with 4 stations and a length of 570 m (1,870 ft) for a total cost of €40 million. By 2018, the project had gone back to the planning stage without any construction having occurred after significant community opposition and €16 million spent on feasibility studies.
