= TER Provence-Alpes-Côte d'Azur =

Regional rail network in Provence-Alpes-Côte d'Azur, France

TER Provence-Alpes-Côte-d'Azur

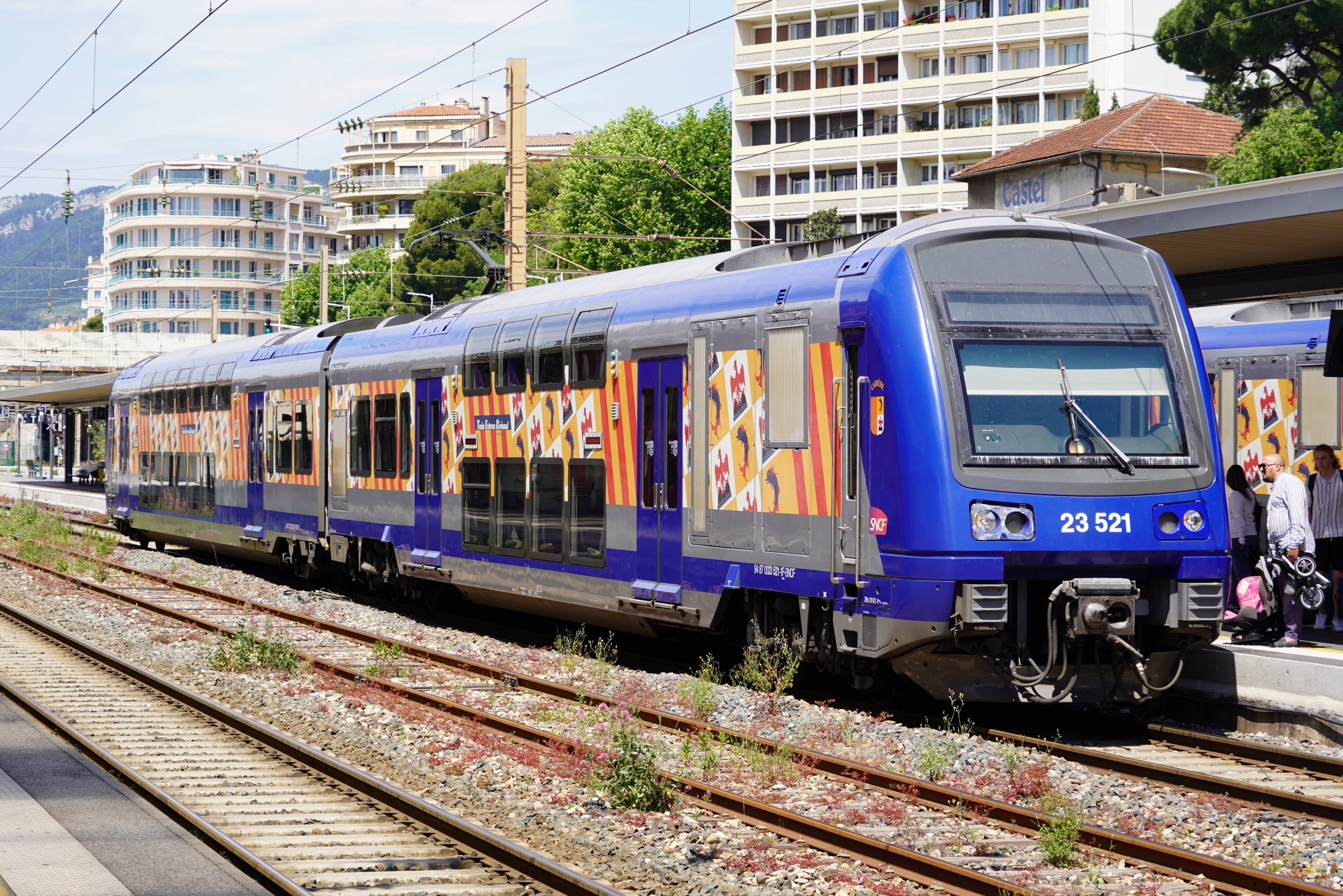
- Z 23500 in TER PACA livery, at Toulon station.

Overview
- Owner: SNCF
- Area served: Provence-Alpes-Côte-d'Azur
- Transit type: Regional rail
- Number of lines: 16
- Number of stations: 145
- Daily ridership: 64,300
- Website: m.ter.sncf.com/sud-provence-alpes-cote-d-azur

Operation
- Began operation: 1986
- Operator: SNCF

Technical
- Track gauge: 1,435 mm (4 ft 8 1/2 in) standard gauge
- Electrification: 25 kV AC overhead lines

TER Provence Alpes-Côte-d'Azur, branded as TER Zou!, is the regional rail network serving the Provence-Alpes-Côte d'Azur region in France. This network is operated by SNCF, although services between Nice and Marseille will instead be operated by a subsidiary of Transdev from June 2025, after winning a competitive tender held by the region in 2021.
The public transport authority, the Regional Council, runs 800 trains a day, especially near Avignon, Marseille, Toulon and Nice. 100,000 users take regional trains each day.

== Network ==
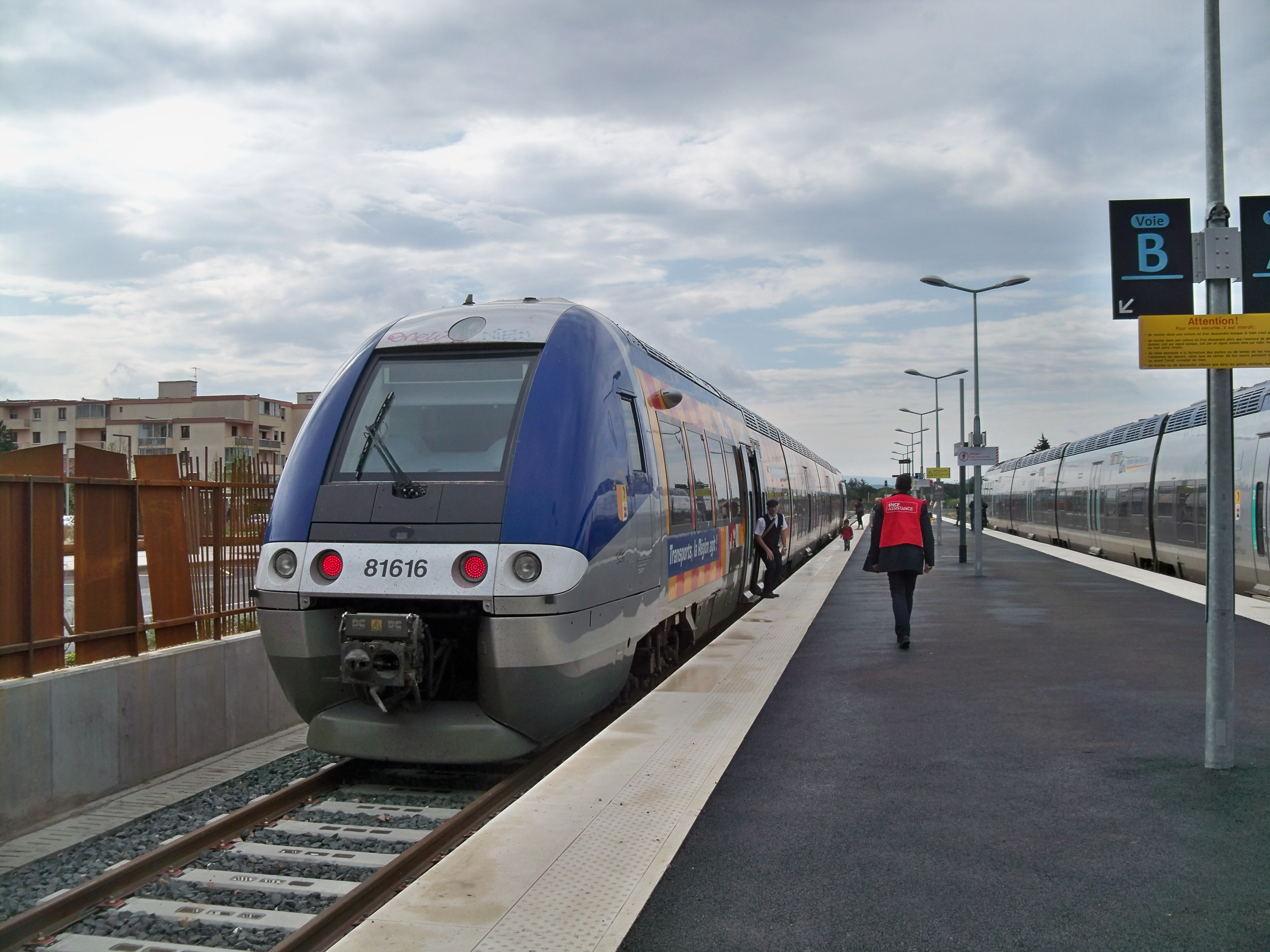
A SNCF TER Provence-Alpes-Côte-d'Azur train in Carpentras

The network is made up of 17 train lines. All bus lines are operated by private operators under the Regional Council Authority.

Unlike most other regions in France, the Provence-Alpes-Côte d'Azur separates their trains into two services:

- TER : suburban or local services, with only 2nd class wagons. These trains are operated with multiple units.
- Intervilles : regional InterCity trains (not to be confused with InterCités trains, a nationwide service), with 1st and 2nd class, except between Marseille, Gap and Briançon.

This separation is done due to the presence of big metropolises on the coast (Marseille, Toulon and Nice) and a very rural hinterland (French Alps). Toulon does not have suburban services, as these are absorbed into Marseille. The suburban trains from Marseille also continue onto Avignon, 100 kilometres (62 mi) away.

Rail and bus services map as of 2012

=== Rail ===
The rail network as of May 2022:

Rail transport infrastructure map of Provence-Alpes-Côte d'Azur, showing main stations, number of tracks, power source and maximum speed.

Line	Route	Frequency	Notes
1	Marseille ... Aubagne ... Toulon ... Hyères	In rush hour, 1 train each 20 minutes between Marseille and Aubagne; 1 train each 15 minutes between Marseille, Aubagne and Toulon.	5h – 24h
2	Toulon ... Carnoules ... Les Arcs-Draguignan	1 train each 2 hours	6h – 22h
3	Les Arcs-Draguignan ... Saint-Raphaël-Valescure ... Cannes ... Nice	1 train each hour, every 30 minutes during rush hour	5h – 21h
4	Mandelieu-la-Napoule – Cannes-la-Bocca – Cannes – Golfe-Juan-Vallauris – Juan-les-Pins – Antibes – Biot† – Villeneuve-Loubet-plage† – Cagnes-sur-Mer – Cros-de-Cagnes† – Saint-Laurent-du-Var – Nice-Saint-Augustin – Nice-Ville – Nice-Riquier – Villefranche-sur-Mer – Beaulieu-sur-Mer – Èze-sur-Mer† – Cap-d'Ail† – Monaco-Monte-Carlo – Cap-Martin-Roquebrune† – Carnolès – Menton – Menton-Garavan – (Italy) Ventimiglia branch line: Grasse – Mouans-Sartoux – Ranguin – La Frayère – Le Bosquet – Cannes	1 train each hour, every 30 minutes during rush hour	6h – 24h
5	Tende ... Breil-sur-Roya ... Nice	5 trains a day	
6	Marseille – Toulon – Carnoules† – Les Arcs-Draguignan – Fréjus† – Saint-Raphaël-Valescure – Cannes – Antibes – Nice-Saint-Augustin – Nice	Intervilles InterCity train, 1 train each 2 hours	4h – 23h
7bis	Miramas ... Martigues ... Marseille	1 train each hour, every 30 minutes during rush hour	6h – 21h
8 (7)	Avignon – Arles ... Miramas ... Vitrolles Aéroport ... Marseille	1 train each hour, every 30 minutes during rush hour	5h – 21h
9	Avignon TGV† – Avignon ... Cavaillon ... Miramas – Vitrolles Aéroport – Marseille	1 train each hour, every 30 minutes during rush hour	5h – 20h
9bis	Carpentras ... Avignon-Centre – Avignon TGV	2 trains each hour	6h – 23h
10	Lyon-Part-Dieu ... Valence ... Orange ... Avignon – Arles – Miramas – Marseille	Intervilles InterCity train, 1 train each 2 hours	4h – 23h
11	Narbonne ... Montpellier ... Nîmes ... Arles ... Marseille-Saint-Charles (see TER Occitanie line 6 for details)	1 train each 3 hours, every 2 hours during rush hour	5h – 20h
12	Pertuis ... Aix-en-Provence ... Marseille-Saint-Charles	1 train each 20 minutes during rush hour between Marseille and Aix-en-Provence	5h – 24h
13	Briançon ... Gap ... Veynes-Dévoluy ... Aix-en-Provence ... Marseille-Saint-Charles	Intervilles InterCity train, 4 trains a day	4h – 23h
14	Briançon ... Gap ... Veynes-Dévoluy ... Die ... Valence ... Romans-Bourg-de-Péage (see TER Auvergne-Rhône-Alpes line 64 for details)	1 train each 3 hours	4h – 22h
15	Gap ... Veynes-Dévoluy ... Grenoble (see TER Auvergne-Rhône-Alpes line 63 for details)	1 train each 4 hours	5h – 23h
† Not all trains serve this station

Rail service not part of the TER Provence-Alpes-Côte d'Azur network:

- Nice CP – Digne-les-Bains, operated by the Chemins de Fer de Provence

== Future ==
With the building of the new LGV Provence-Alpes-Côte d'Azur line between Marseille and Monaco expected by 2030, regional traffic may grow. This will be achieved through the introduction of a new high speed train calling every hour at Marseille Provence Airport, the construction of a new underground train station in downtown Marseille, a new high speed stop in Marseille's Eastern Districts, and the enlargement of Toulon, Nice Côte d'Azur Airport and Nice Ville train stations.

== Rolling stock ==
=== Multiple units ===
- SNCF Class Z 23500
- SNCF Class Z 26500
- SNCF Class B 81500 Also called BGC B 81500
- SNCF Class X 76500 Also called XGC Z 76500
- SNCF Class Z55500

=== Locomotives ===
- SNCF Class BB 22200
- SNCF Class BB 25500
- SNCF Class BB 67400

== See also ==
- Transport express régional
- Réseau Ferré de France
- List of SNCF stations in Provence-Alpes-Côte d'Azur
