= Martigues station =

Railway station in Martigues, France

Coordinates: 43°23′35″N 5°1′34″E

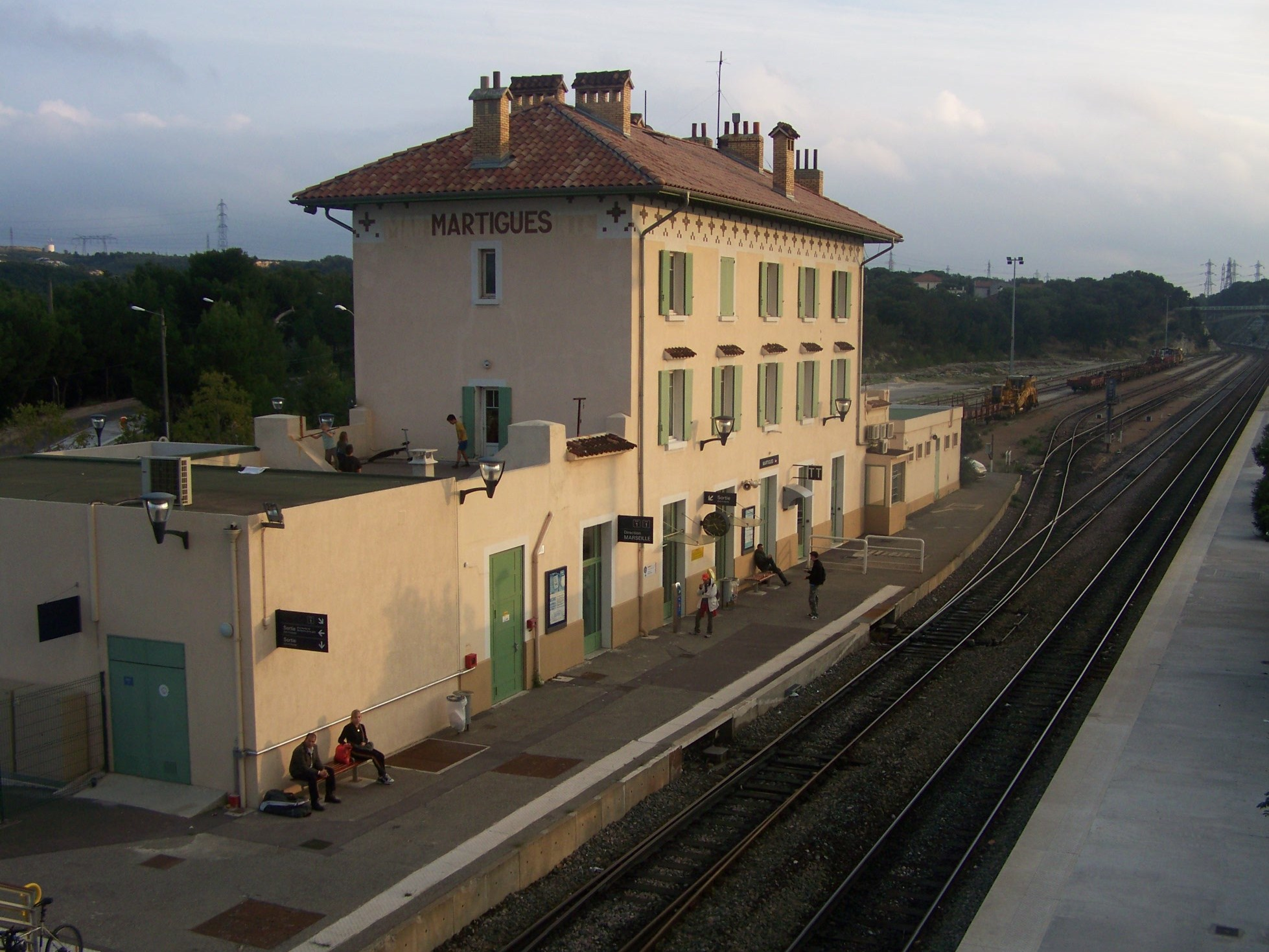
Gare de Martigues

Gare de Martigues is a railway station serving the town Martigues, Bouches-du-Rhône department, southeastern France. It is served by trains between Marseille and Miramas.

Preceding station	TER PACA	Following station
Croix-Sainte towards Miramas	7bis	La Couronne-Carro towards Marseille
