= Les Arcs–Draguignan station =

Railway station in Les Arcs, France

Coordinates: 43°27′20″N 6°28′56″E

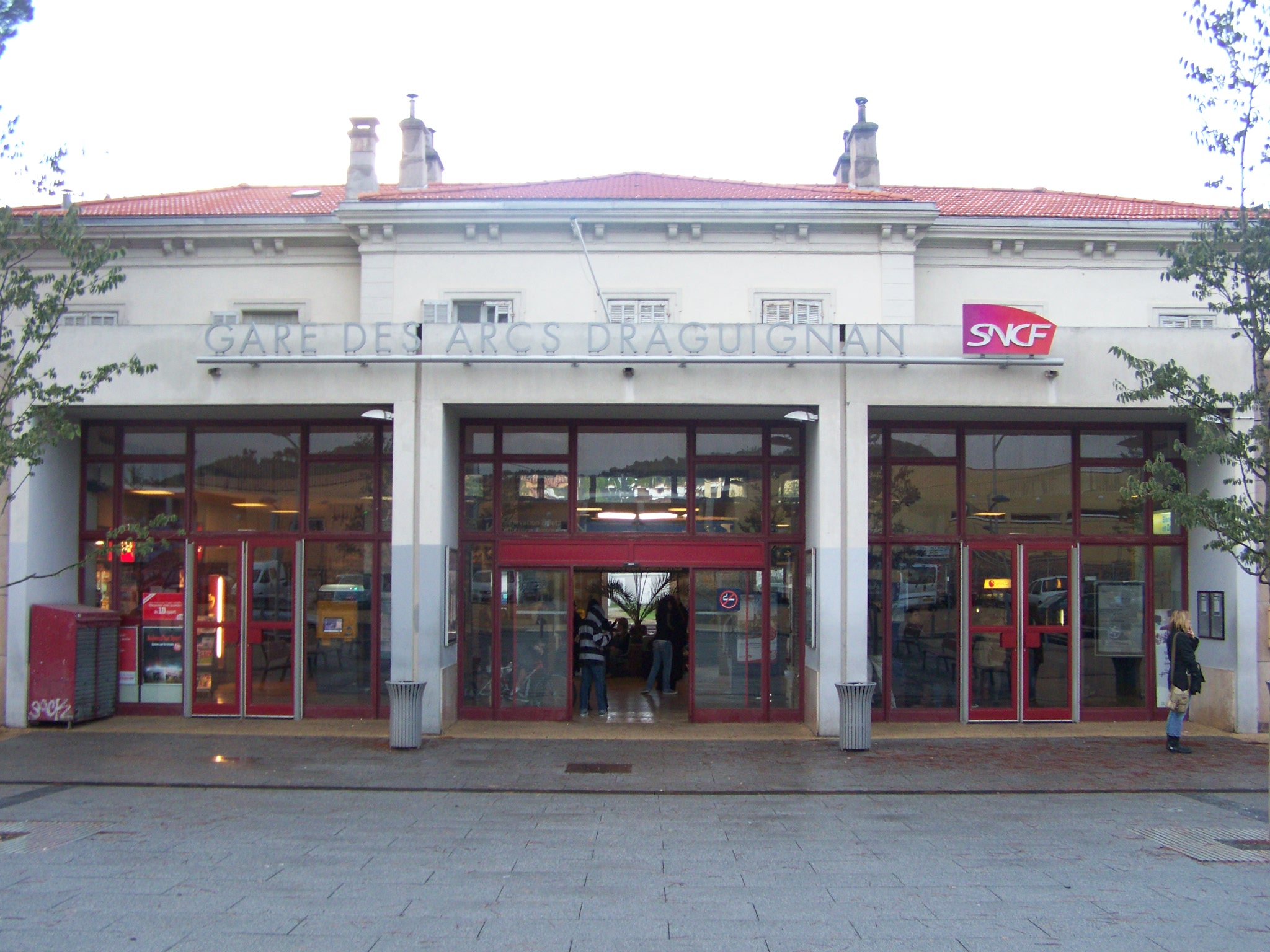
Station in 2008

Les Arcs–Draguignan is a railway station in Les Arcs and near the town Draguignan, Var department, southeastern France. It is situated on the Marseille–Ventimiglia railway. The station is served by high speed trains to Paris, Nancy and Nice, and regional trains (TER Provence-Alpes-Côte d'Azur) to Nice, Marseille and Toulon.

Preceding station	SNCF	Following station
Toulon towards Paris-Lyon	TGV inOui	Cannes towards Nice-Ville
Toulon towards Nancy-Ville	TGV inOui	Cannes towards Nice-Ville
Toulon towards Paris-Austerlitz	Intercités (night)	Cannes towards Nice-Ville
Preceding station	Ouigo	Following station
Toulon towards Paris-Lyon	Grande Vitesse	Saint-Raphaël-Valescure towards Nice
Preceding station	TER PACA	Following station
Vidauban towards Toulon	2	Terminus
Terminus	3	Fréjus towards Nice
Carnoules towards Marseille	6	Fréjus towards Nice
