= Marseille–Ventimiglia railway =

French, Monégasque and Italian railway

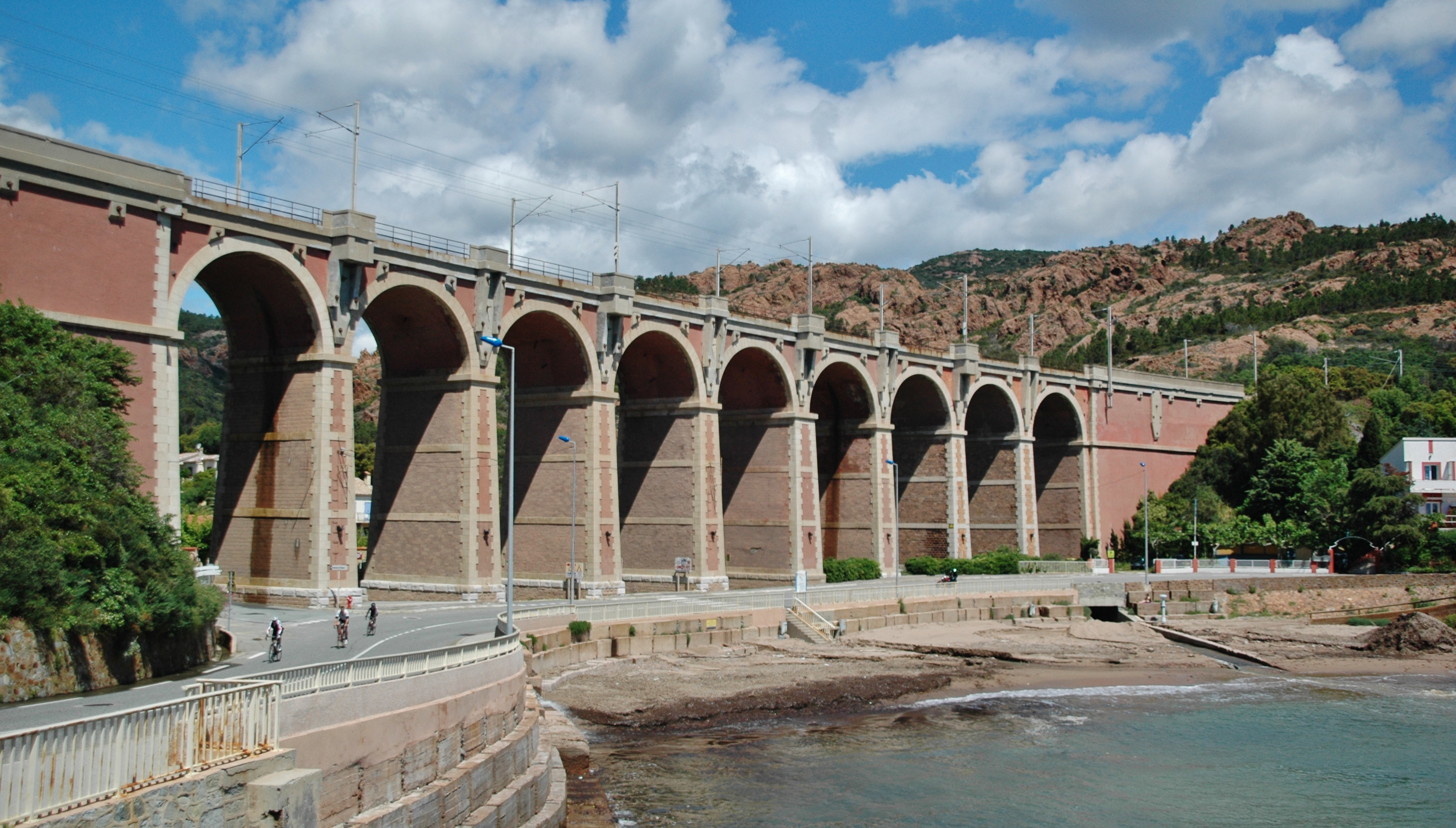
- The Viaduc of Anthéor in the Massif de l'Esterel on the Mediterranean coast

Overview
- Status: Operational
- Owner: SNCF Réseau
- Locale: France (Provence-Alpes-Côte d'Azur); Monaco, Italy (Liguria)
- Termini: Marseille-Saint-Charles; Ventimiglia

Service
- System: SNCF
- Operator(s): SNCF

History
- Opened: 1858–1872

Technical
- Line length: 259 km (161 mi)
- Number of tracks: Double track 4 tracks (Saint-Charles–Blancarde); 3 tracks (Blancarde–Aubagne); 3 tracks (Cannes–Nice)
- Track gauge: 1,435 mm (4 ft 8 1/2 in) standard gauge
- Electrification: 25 kV 50 Hz AC except 1.5 kV DC on: Marseille-Saint-Charles to La Pomme, 257.475 km mark to Ventimiglia
- Signalling: BAL - automatic block
- Maximum incline: 8%

The Marseille–Ventimiglia railway (French: Ligne de Marseille-Saint-Charles à Vintimille; Italian: Ferrovia Marsiglia-Ventimiglia) is a French-Monégasque-Italian 259-kilometre-long (161 mi) railway line. It was constructed and opened in several stages between 1858 and 1872.

The line serves as an important transport corridor, connecting the French and Italian Rivieras, and accommodates both passenger (express, regional, and suburban) and freight traffic. It has played a significant role in the region's economic development by facilitating trade and tourism between France and Italy, serving as the primary railway line for the French Riviera (Côte d'Azur). The line was also strategically important during World War II for transporting troops and supplies to the Italian front.

A new high-speed line, the LGV Provence-Alpes-Côte d'Azur, is planned for opening around 2035 to offer quicker travel times between Marseille, Toulon, Cannes and Nice.

== History ==
The Marseille–Ventimiglia railway was built and used by the Chemins de fer de Paris à Lyon et à la Méditerranée. The first section that was opened in 1858 led from Marseille to Aubagne. The line was extended to Toulon in 1859 and to Les Arcs in 1862. Cagnes-sur-Mer was reached in 1863 and Nice in 1864. The line was extended to Monaco in 1868 and to Menton in 1869. Finally in 1872 the section to Ventimiglia was opened. The construction of the Marseille to Ventimiglia railway line was a significant engineering feat of the time. The line had to cross the rugged terrain of the Maritime Alps, which presented numerous challenges, such as steep gradients and tight curves. To overcome these obstacles, the engineers had to use a combination of tunnels, viaducts, and bridges. For example, the line crosses the Var river on a massive steel viaduct, which was an engineering marvel at the time of its construction. The line also includes several tunnels, such as the Tenda Tunnel which is 5.8 km long and was considered a major achievement of the time.

== Infrastructure and future development ==
Over the years, the Marseille to Ventimiglia railway line has undergone several upgrades and renovations to improve service and capacity. In the 1960s, the line was modernized, with the installation of new signaling and communication systems, and the electrification of the line. In the 2000s, the French and Italian governments invested in the line, upgrading the infrastructure and increasing the number of trains running on the line. This has led to a significant increase in the number of passengers using the line, and has also improved the reliability and punctuality of the service. A new high-speed line, the LGV Provence-Alpes-Côte d'Azur, is planned to be built somewhat inland of the current line. It is intended to be operational around 2035 to offer quicker travel times between Marseille, Toulon, Cannes and Nice.

== Main stations ==
The line's main stations are: Marseille-Saint-Charles, Marseille-Blancarde, Aubagne, La Ciotat, Toulon, Fréjus, Cannes, Juan-les-Pins, Antibes, Nice-Saint-Augustin, Nice-Ville, Nice-Riquier, Monaco Monte-Carlo (underground), Menton and Ventimiglia.

== Gallery ==
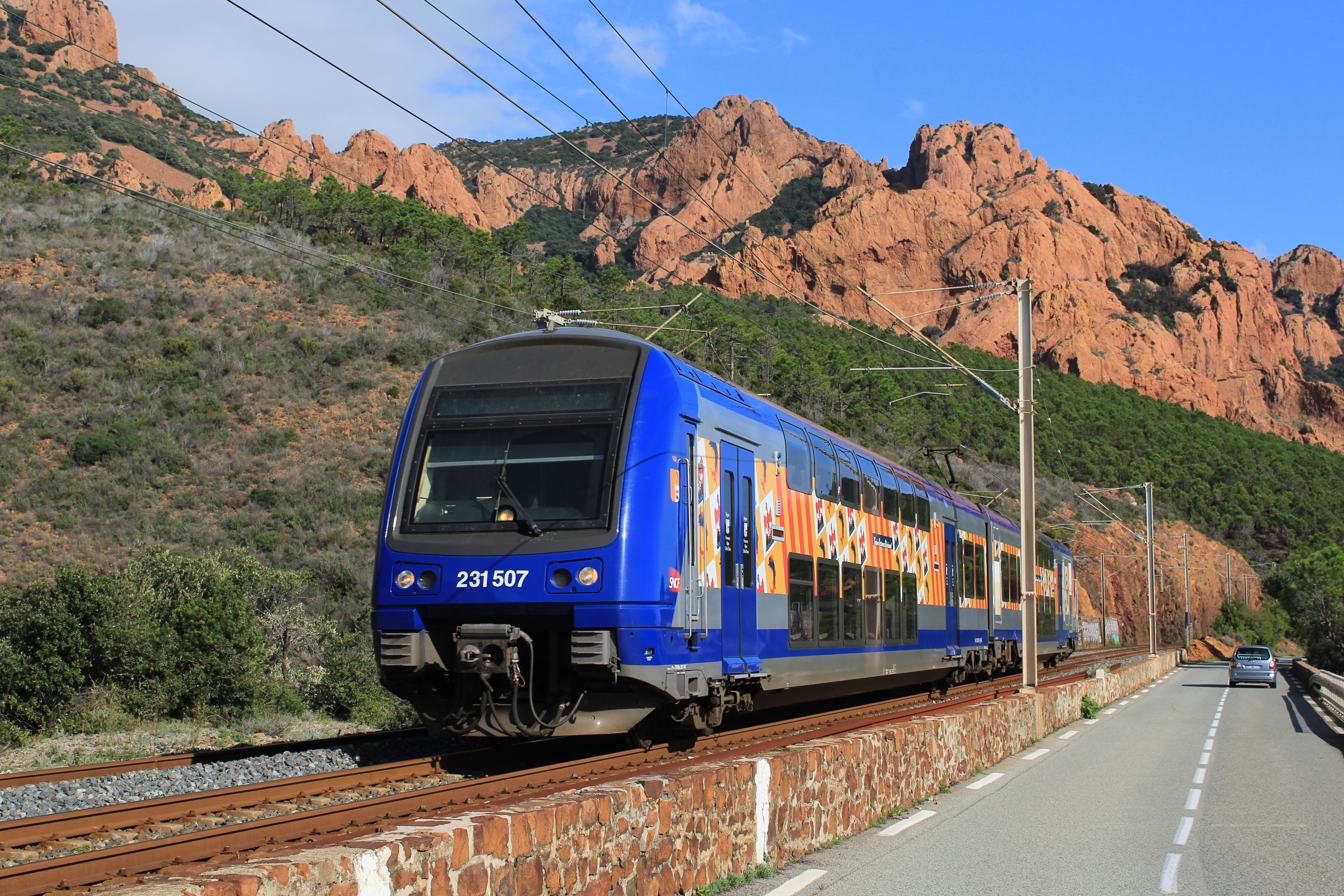
A SNCF Class Z 23500 in the Massif de l'Esterel

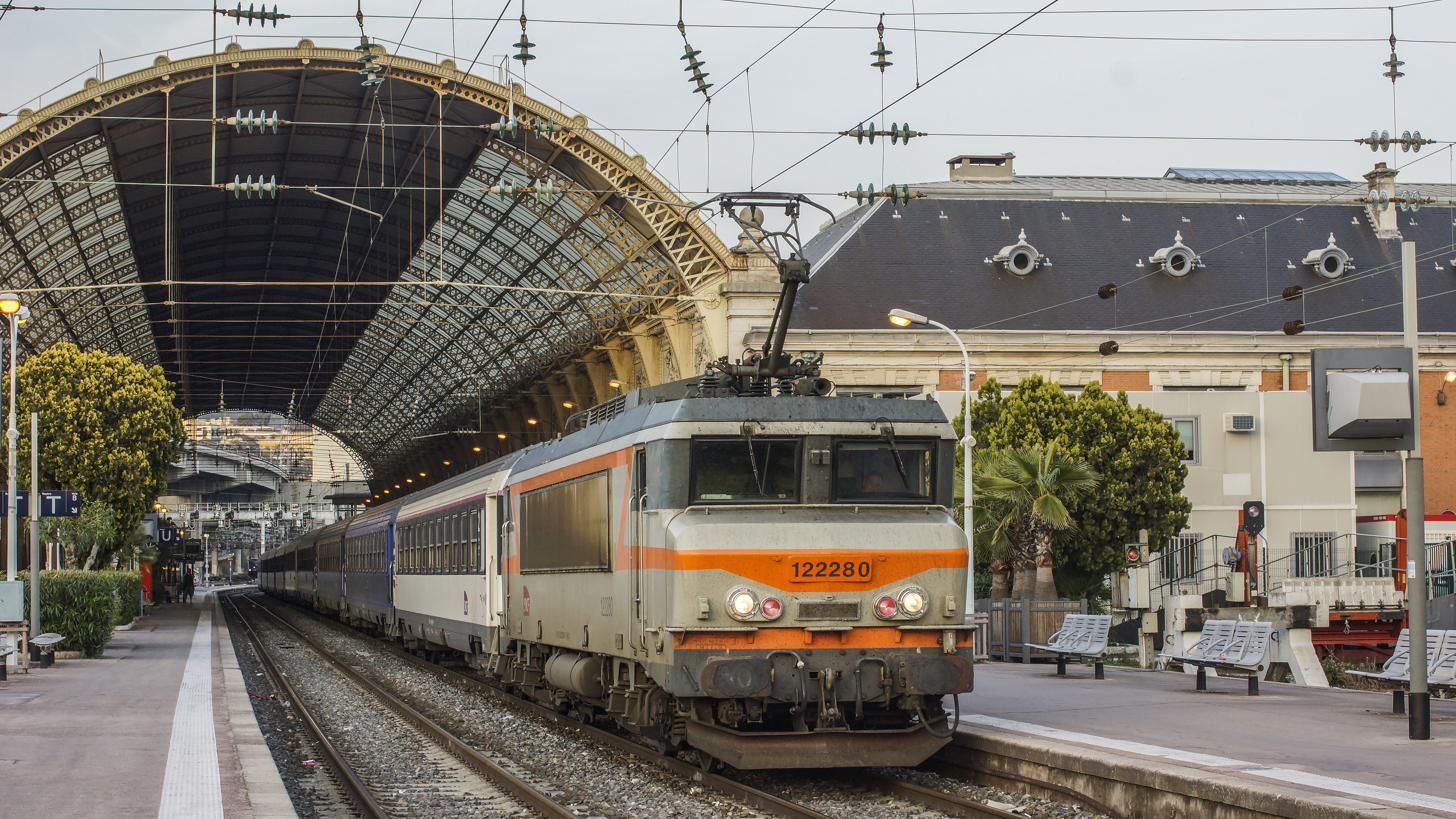
A SNCF Class BB 22200 in Nice headed for Paris with a night train

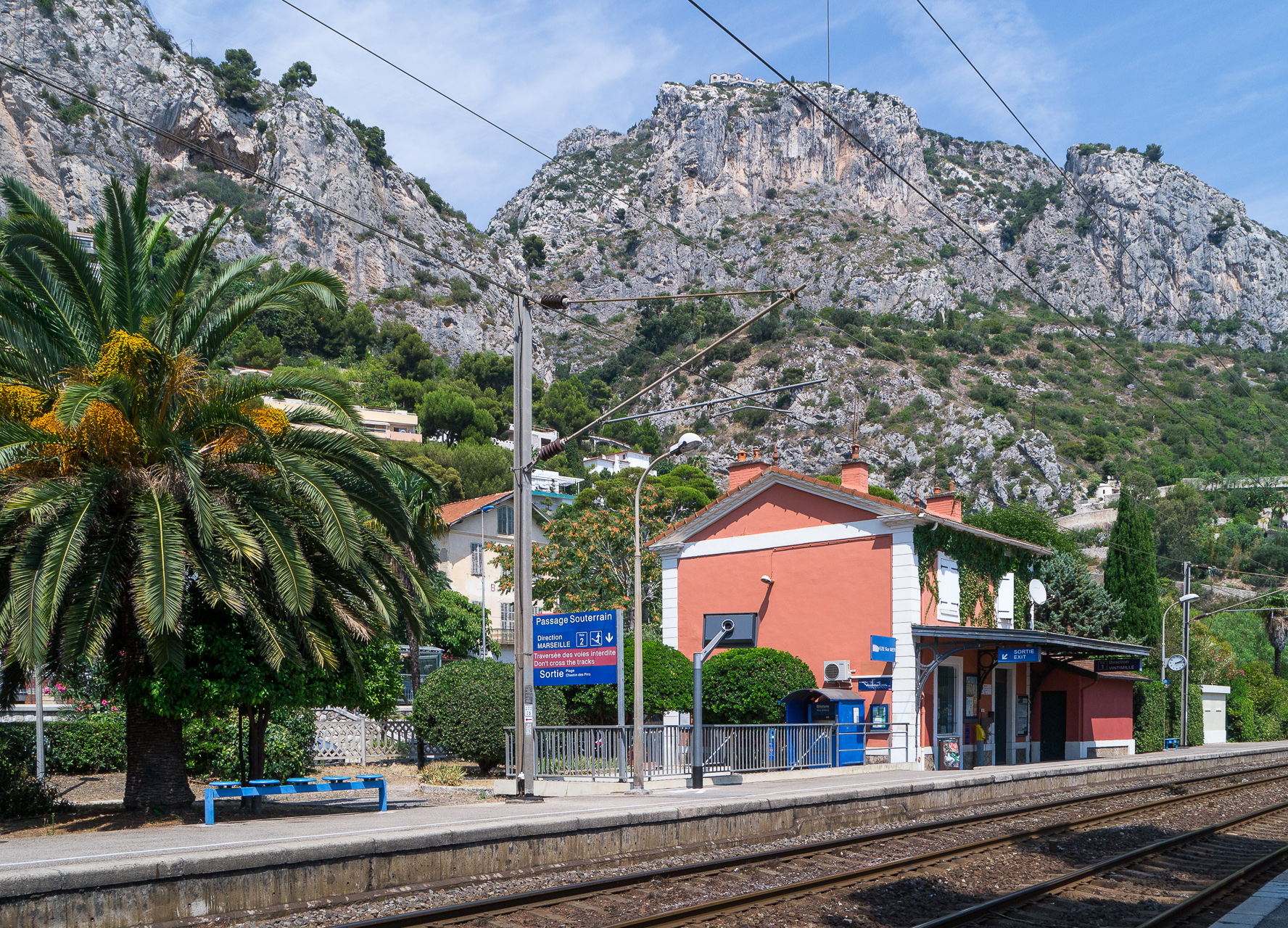
Èze-sur-Mer

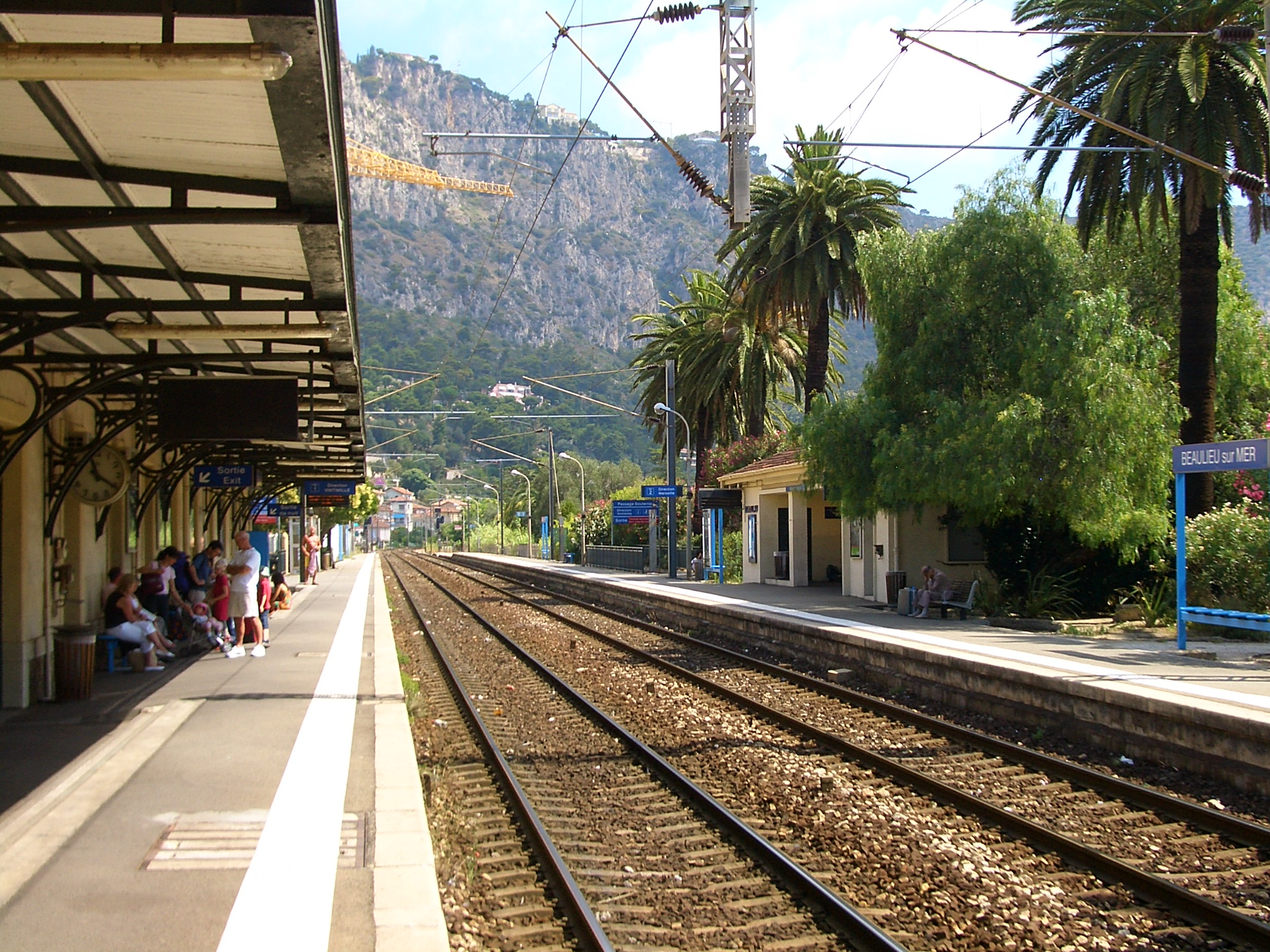
Beaulieu-sur-Mer

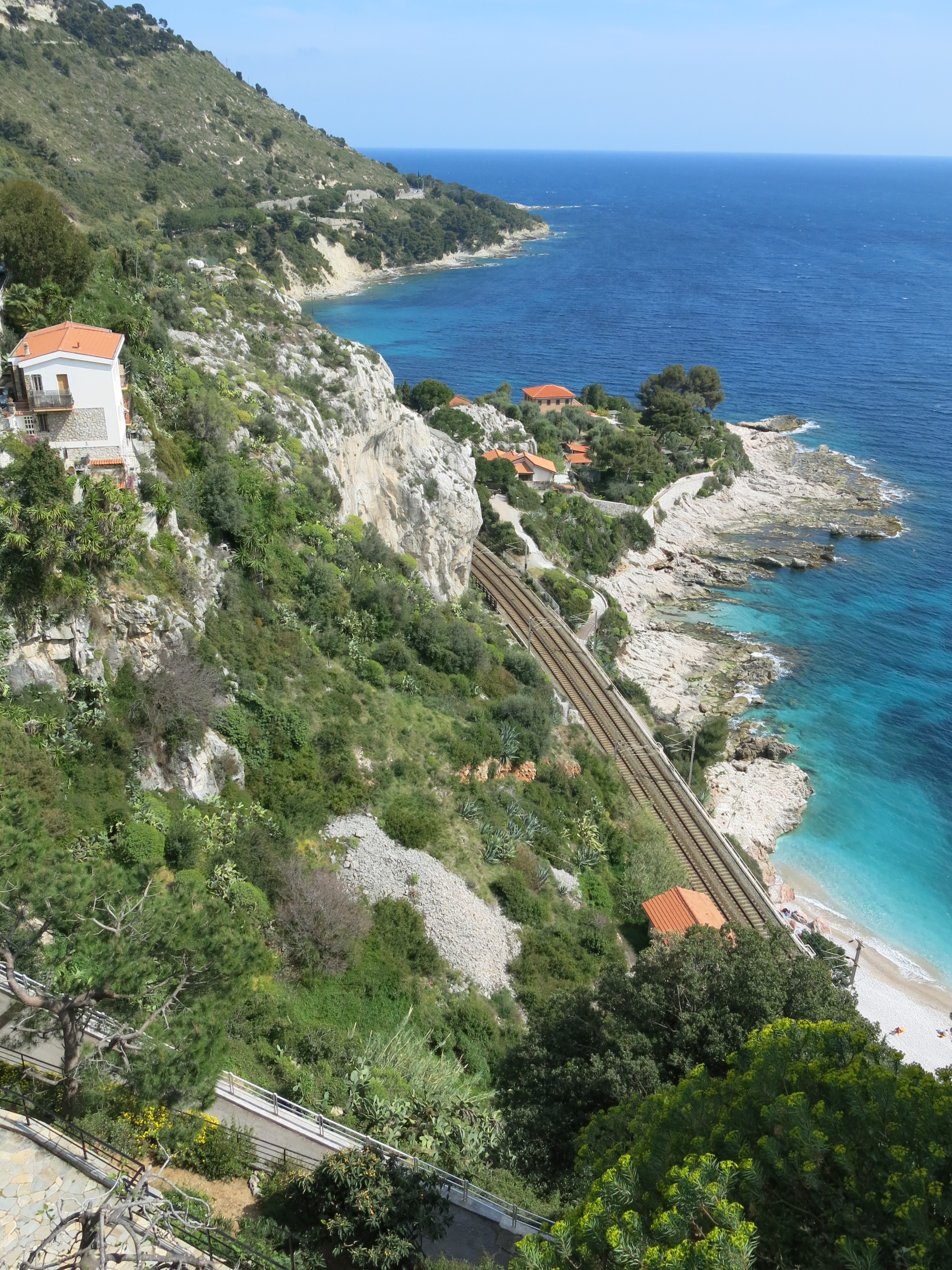
Line near Ventimiglia

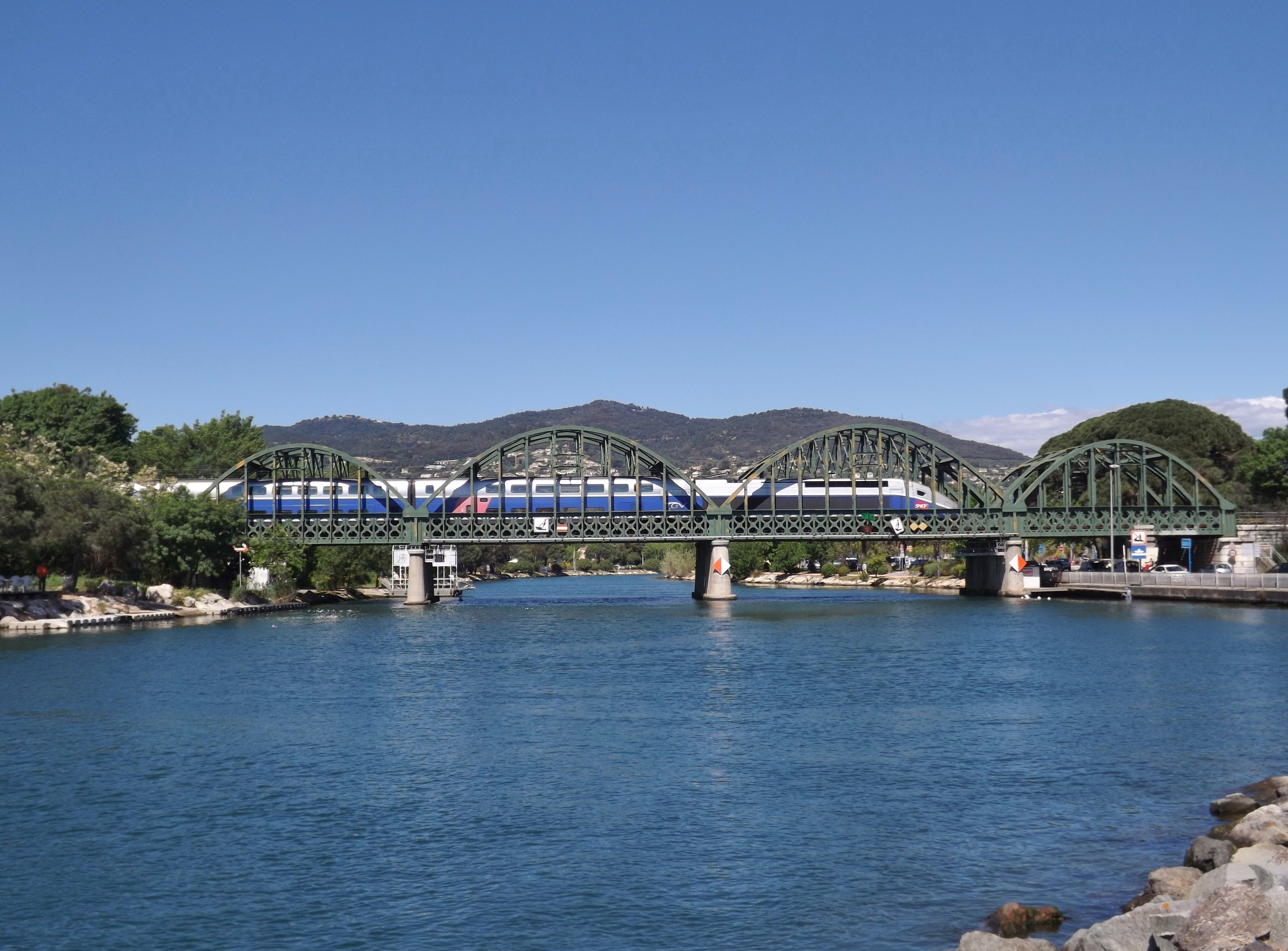
A TGV Duplex crossing the Siagne in the Alpes-Maritimes department

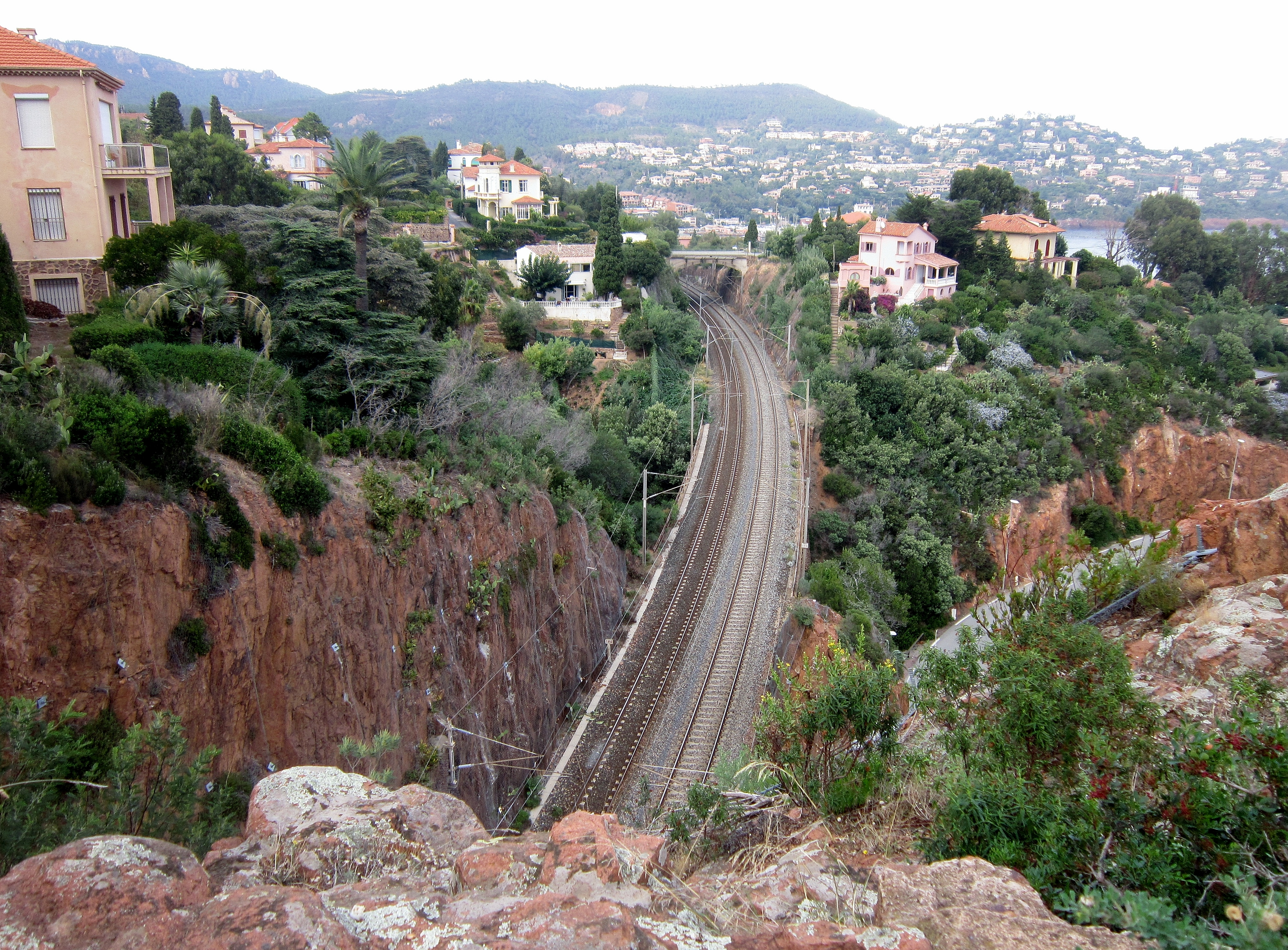
Théoule-sur-Mer

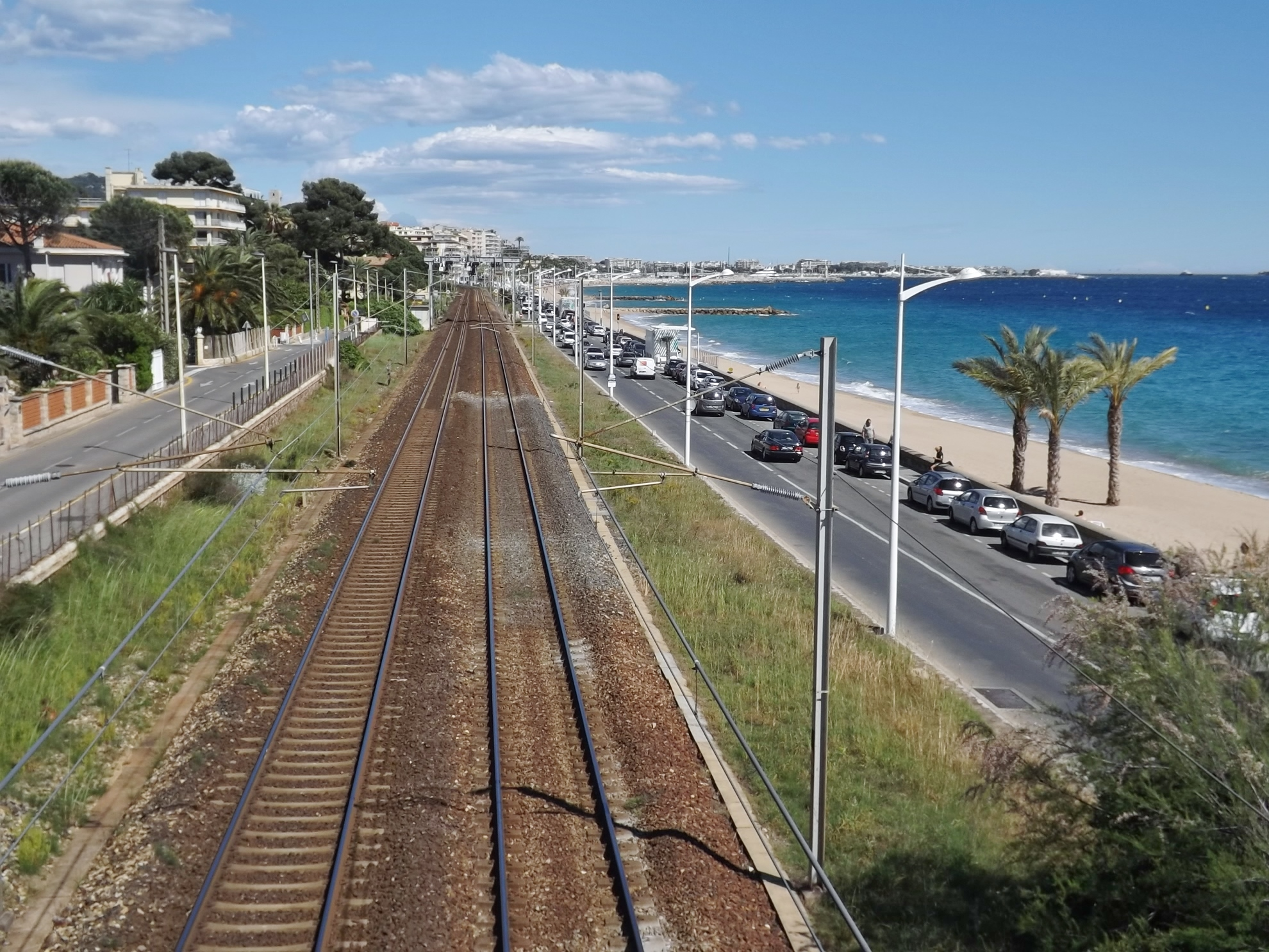
The line arriving at Cannes
