= Nice-Ville station =

Railway station in Nice, France

Nice–Ville
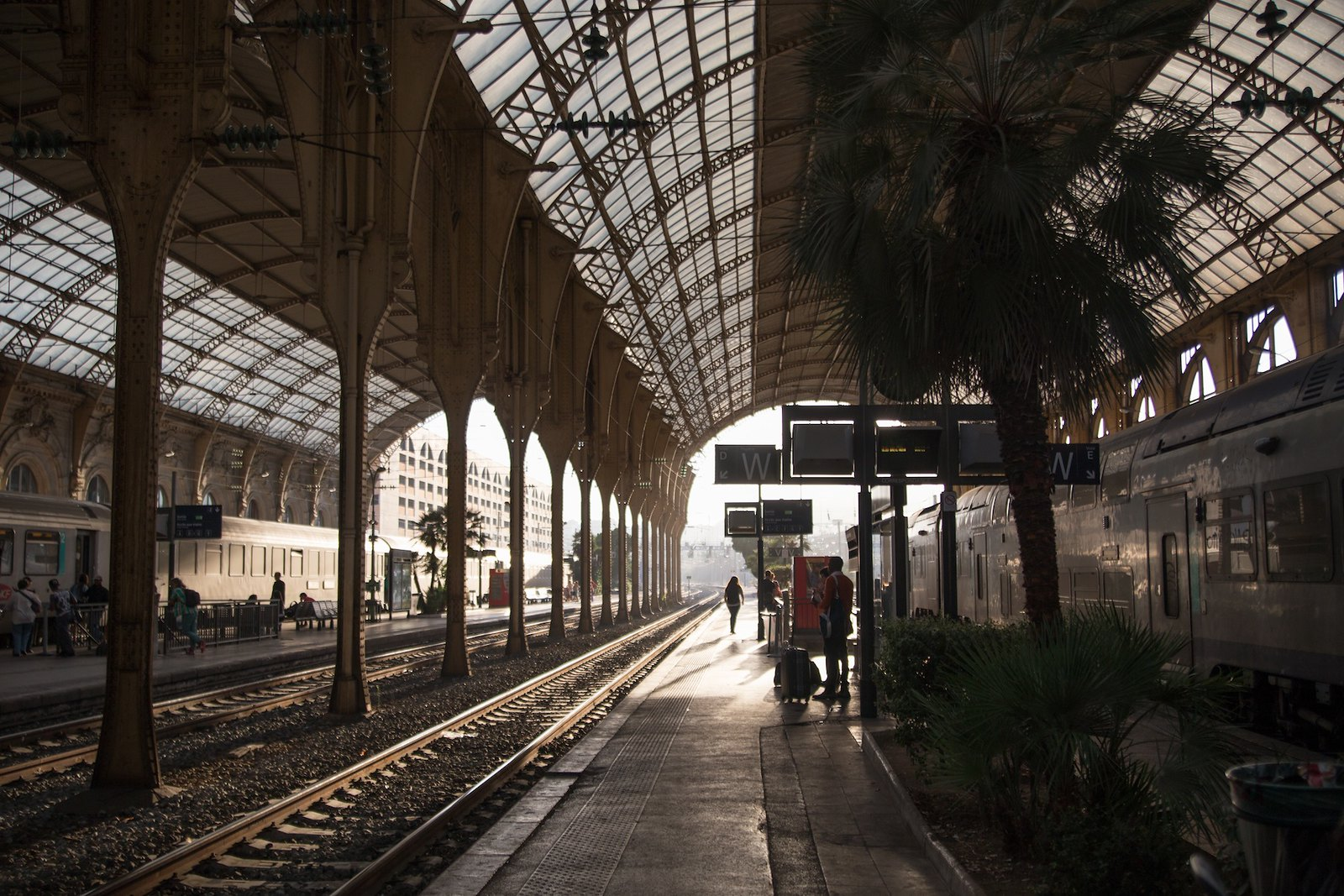
- Station in October 2014

General information
- Location: Avenue Thiers, 06008 Nice; France
- Coordinates: 43°42′16″N 7°15′43″E
- Owner: SNCF Réseau
- Lines: Marseille–Ventimiglia railway Nice–Breil-sur-Roya railway
- Platforms: 7

Other information
- Station code: 87756056

History
- Opened: 18 October 1864

Passengers
- 2024: 12,131,450
Services
Preceding station	SNCF	Following station
Antibes towards Paris-Lyon	TGV inOui Seasonal service	Monaco-Monte-Carlo towards Menton
Antibes towards Lyon-Part-Dieu	TGV inOui	Terminus
Antibes towards Paris-Austerlitz	Intercités (night)	Terminus
Preceding station	Ouigo	Following station
Antibes towards Paris-Lyon	Grande Vitesse	Terminus
Preceding station	TER PACA	Following station
Nice-Saint-Augustin towards Les Arcs–Draguignan	3	Terminus
Nice-Saint-Augustin towards Mandelieu-la-Napoule or Grasse	4	Nice-Riquier towards Ventimiglia
Nice-Pont-Michel towards Tende	5	Terminus
Nice-Saint-Augustin towards Marseille	6	Terminus
Other services
Preceding station	Trenitalia	Following station
Antibes towards Marseille-St-Charles	Thello	Monaco-Monte-Carlo towards Milano Centrale
Location

Nice-Ville station (French: Gare de Nice-Ville), also known as Nice-Thiers station (Gare de Nice-Thiers), is the main railway station of Nice, France. It is situated on the Marseille–Ventimiglia railway and constitutes the southwestern terminus of the Nice–Breil-sur-Roya railway. Nice-Ville is served by TER, Intercités and TGV services, as well as the Gare Thiers stop on Line 1 of the Nice tramway.

== Overview ==
The station was opened in 1864 and completed in 1867 for the Chemins de fer de Paris à Lyon et à la Méditerranée (PLM) by architect Louis-Jules Bouchot in Louis XIII style.

Nice Ville was built away from the centre although Nice has now extended around the station. The station has been remodelled several times but always kept its original style of Arles stone sculptures and forged steel rooftop. The passenger hall is richly decorated and shadowed by balconies and a big clock but has lost its grand chandeliers.

It has remained in its original condition since its opening, although modern equipment has been installed to welcome the arrival of the TGV Sud-Est. Before the arrival of the TGV, the station was host to several other prestigious express trains: Côte d'Azur Pullman Express, the Blue Train and the Mistral.

== Train services ==
The station is served by the following services:

- High speed services (TGV) Paris (– Marseille) – Cannes – Nice (– Monaco – Menton)
- High speed services (TGV) Lyon – Avignon – Cannes – Nice
- Regional services (TER Provence-Alpes-Côte d'Azur) Marseille – Toulon – Cannes – Nice
- Local services (TER Provence-Alpes-Côte d'Azur) Cannes – Antibes – Nice – Monaco – Menton – Ventimiglia
- Local services (TER Provence-Alpes-Côte d'Azur) Grasse – Cannes – Antibes – Nice – Monaco – Menton – Ventimiglia
- Local services (TER Provence-Alpes-Cote d'Azur) Nice – Breil-sur-Roya – Tende

Please notice that this station, even served by TGV cars, is NOT high speed as the specific track, needed for high speed up to 320 km/h goes only to Marseilles St Charles station. All trains from Marseille to the Italian border (Menton) run at slow speed.

== See also ==
- Nice CP station
- Gare du Sud
- Nice-Riquier station
- Nice-Saint-Augustin station
