= Grasse station =

Railway station in Grasse, France

Grasse
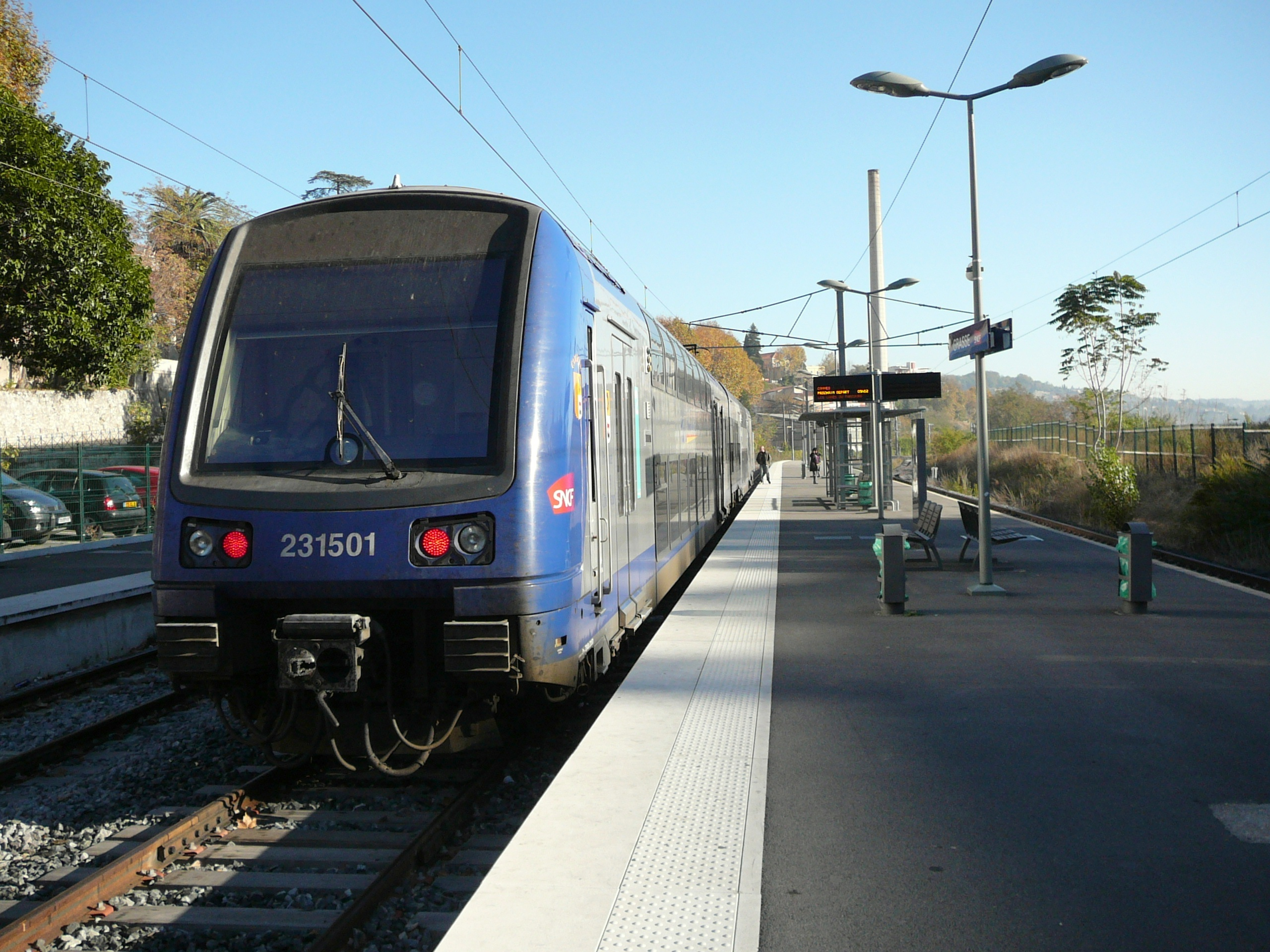
- Grasse station (Alpes-Maritimes, France)

General information
- Location: Grasse, Alpes-Maritimes; Provence-Alpes-Côte d'Azur, France
- Coordinates: 43°39′13″N 6°55′34″E
- Operator: SNCF
- Platforms: 2
- Tracks: 2
- Train operators: TER

Other information
- Station code: 87757724

Services
Preceding station	TER PACA	Following station
Terminus	4	Mouans-Sartoux towards Ventimiglia
Location

Grasse station (French: Gare de Grasse) is a railway station serving Grasse, Alpes-Maritimes department, southeastern France. It is the terminus of the Cannes-la-Bocca to Grasse Railway Line from Cannes. The station opened in 1871, and was closed after 1938 until it was rebuilt and reopened in 2005. From 1909 until 1938, the station was connected to Grasse's town centre by the Grasse Funicular. Proposals to rebuild a funicular have been ongoing since 2005.

The station is served by regional trains (TER Provence-Alpes-Côte d'Azur) to Cannes, Antibes and Nice.

== See also ==
- List of SNCF stations in Provence-Alpes-Côte d'Azur
