= Cannes-la-Bocca station =

Railway station in Cannes, France

Coordinates: 43°32′56″N 6°59′12″E

Cannes-la-Bocca
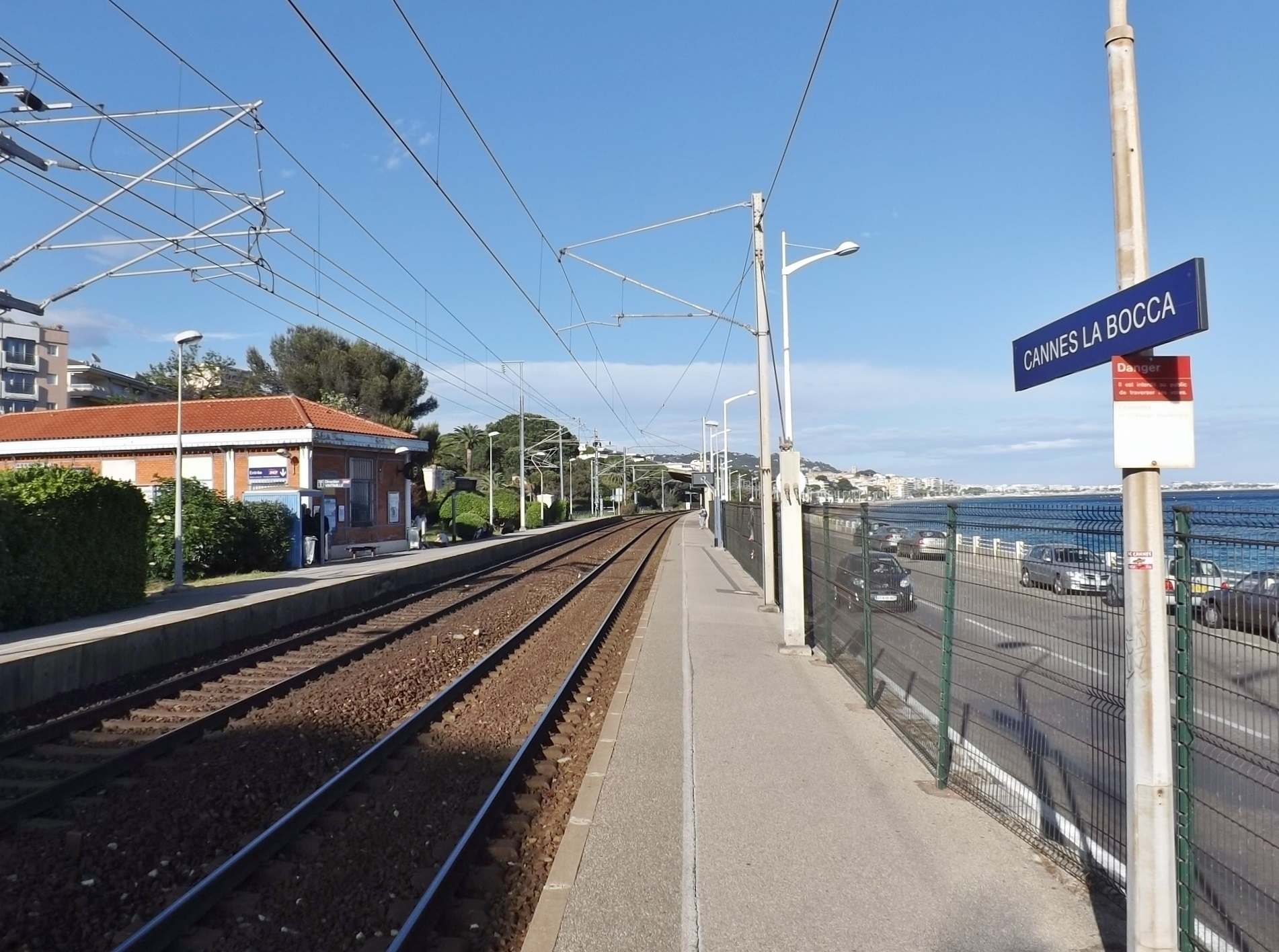
- Station platforms and building in 2014.

General information
- Location: 1, rue Louis Armand; 06150 Cannes
- Owner: SNCF
- Operator: SNCF

Other information
- Station code: 87757617

Services
Preceding station	TER PACA	Following station
Mandelieu-La Napoule towards Les Arcs–Draguignan	3	Cannes towards Nice
Mandelieu-La Napoule Terminus	4	Cannes towards Ventimiglia
Location

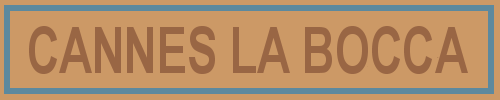
Station letterhead.

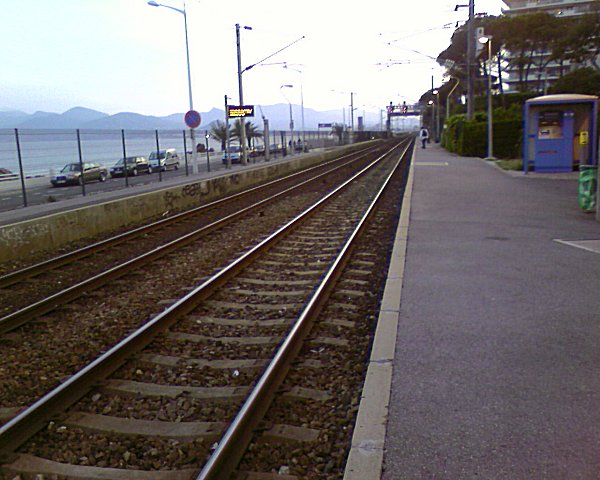
Cannes-La Bocca station in 2006.

Cannes-la-Bocca station (French: Gare de Cannes-la-Bocca) is a railway station in the city of Cannes, southern France.

The station opened on 10 April 1863 when the line from Les Arcs to Cagnes-sur-Mer (part of the Marseille–Ventimiglia railway) opened to passengers. The station is both a passenger station and a goods/maintenance depot. Engine maintenance was transferred from Cannes-Ville in 1880 and the goods yard opened in 1883. The station is served by regional trains (TER Provence-Alpes-Côte d'Azur) to Cannes and Nice.

Cannes-La Bocca is situated alongside the beach and a connection to local ferries is possible.

== Bus connections ==
The station is connected by many lines such as :

- Palm Bus: A 1 2 14 N20 R4
- ZOU06! : 662

== See also ==
- Cannes-Le Bosquet
- Cannes-Ranguin
- Cannes-Ville
