= Cuneo railway station =

Railway station in Piedmont, Italy

Cuneo
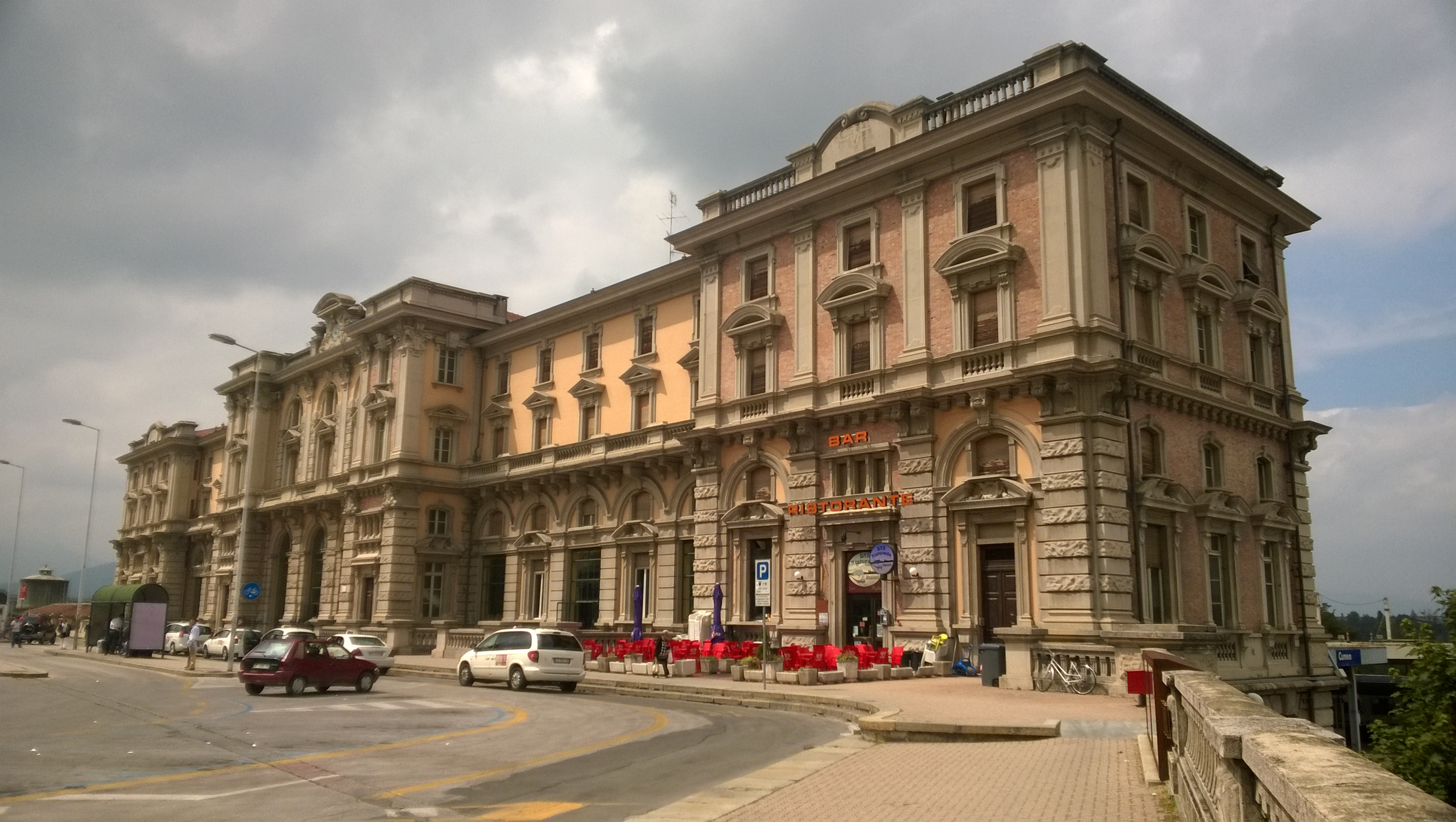
- The passenger building.

General information
- Location: Piazzale della Libertà; 12100 Cuneo CN; Cuneo, Cuneo, Piedmont; Italy
- Coordinates: 44°23′16″N 07°32′11″E
- Operator: Rete Ferroviaria Italiana; Centostazioni
- Lines: Fossano–Cuneo; Savigliano–Cuneo; Cuneo–Ventimiglia; Cuneo–Mondovì
- Distance: 75.680 km (47.025 mi) from Torino Porta Nuova
- Train operators: Trenitalia
- Connections: Urban and suburban buses

Other information
- Classification: Gold

History
- Opened: 7 November 1937; 88 years ago
Location
- Location within Piedmont Location within Northern Italy Location within Italy

Cuneo railway station, or Cuneo Altipiano railway station (Italian: Stazione di Cuneo or Stazione di Cuneo Altipiano), is the main station serving the city and comune of Cuneo, in the Piedmont region of northwestern Italy. Opened in 1937, it is the junction of the Fossano–Cuneo, Savigliano–Cuneo, Cuneo–Ventimiglia and Cuneo–Mondovì railways.

The station is currently managed by Rete Ferroviaria Italiana (RFI), and the commercial area of the passenger building by Centostazioni, while the train services are operated by Trenitalia. Each of these companies is a subsidiary of Ferrovie dello Stato Italiane (FS), Italy's state-owned rail company.

The other station in the city, Cuneo Gesso, forms part of the Cuneo–Mondovì railway, and is not far from the hamlet of Borgo San Giuseppe (formerly Borgo Gesso).

== Location ==
Cuneo railway station is situated in Piazzale della Libertà, west of the city.

== History ==
The station was opened on 7 November 1937 by the Communications Minister, Antonio Stefano Benni, together with the new Madonna Olmo–Plateau Cuneo–Borgo San Dalmazzo line, which replaced the old Cuneo Gesso–Boves–Borgo San Dalmazzo line.

== Features ==
The station yard consists of five tracks for passengers (numbered from track 1 to track 6, track 2 being used for altering the composition of the trains), and eight other tracks for goods traffic.

The locomotive depot is positioned to the south of the station yard and is connected to it by a double track line.

Since 30 March 2009, the station has been equipped with a new public information system that communicates directly with the equipment used for the management of trains, ensuring timely and up to date information transfer. The station also now has new loudspeakers and monitors, which are operated using a modern information technology system.

== Passenger movements ==
The station has about 3 million passenger movements each year.

It is served by regional trains to Turin and Savona, both via Fossano, and, via Mondovì, to Saluzzo, Ventimiglia and Nice.

== See also ==
- History of rail transport in Italy
- List of railway stations in Piedmont
- Rail transport in Italy
- Railway stations in Italy
