= Nice-Riquier station =

Railway station in France

Nice Riquier
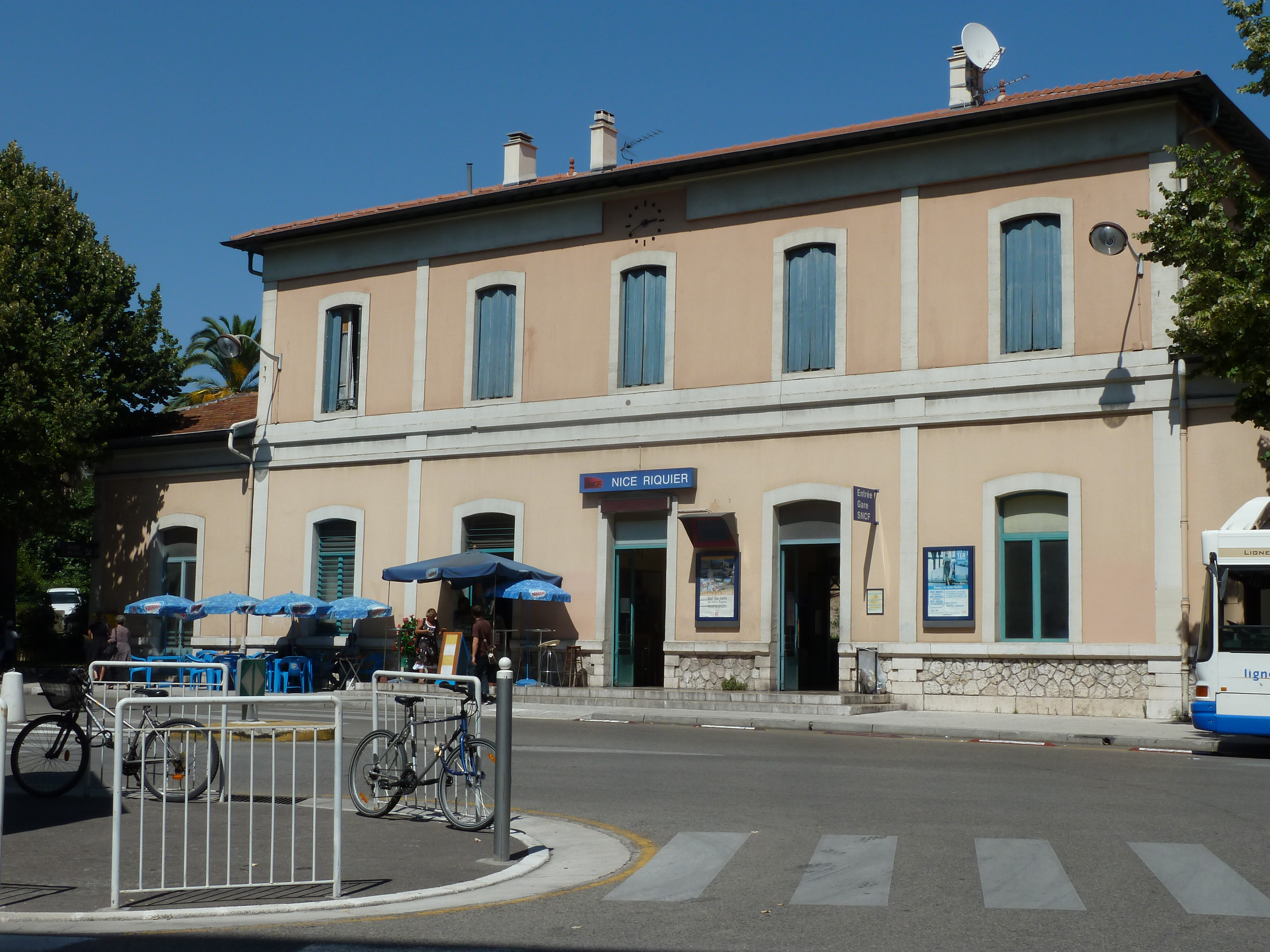

General information
- Location: Nice; France
- Coordinates: 43.705555°N 7.290222°E
- Line: Marseille-Ventimiglia
- Platforms: 2
- Tracks: 2
- Train operators: TER PACA

Construction
- Parking: No
- Cycle facilities: Yes
- Accessible: No

Other information
- Station code: 87756353

Key dates
- 1868: Station Opened

Passengers
- 2024: 2,857,250

Services
Preceding station	TER PACA	Following station
Nice-Ville towards Mandelieu-la-Napoule or Grasse	4	Villefranche-sur-Mer towards Ventimiglia
Location

Nice-Riquier is a train station on the line from Marseille to Ventimiglia, situated in Nice, in the department of Alpes-Maritimes in the region of Provence-Alpes-Côte d'Azur, France. As of 2022, the station is served by regional trains (TER Provence-Alpes-Côte d'Azur) to Cannes, Grasse, Ventimiglia and Nice.
