= Le Bosquet station =

Railway station in Grasse, France

Le Bosquet
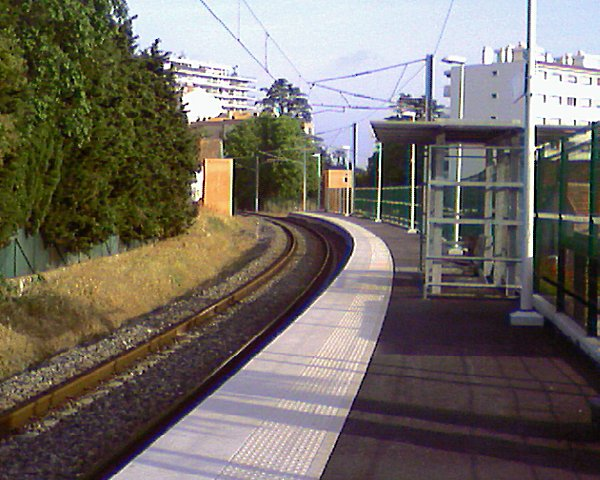
- Train station of Le Bosquet (Alpes-Maritimes, France).

General information
- Location: Cannes, Alpes-Maritimes; Provence-Alpes-Côte d'Azur, France
- Coordinates: 43.5514°N 6.9816°E
- Operator: SNCF
- Platforms: 2
- Tracks: 2
- Train operators: TER

Other information
- Station code: 87757757

Services
Preceding station	TER PACA	Following station
La Frayère towards Grasse	4	Cannes towards Ventimiglia
Location

Le Bosquet is a station in the city of Cannes, southern France.

The station opened on 10 April 1870 when the line from Grasse to Cannes opened to passengers. Due to its position on a branch line from Grasse near the La Bocca Junction, it is close to its main line counterpart of La Bocca.

Le Bosquet is situated on the picturesque single line to Grasse, reopened in 2004.

== Bus connections ==
The station is connected by many lines such as :

- Palm Bus: 14

== Services ==
The station is served by regional trains (TER Provence-Alpes-Côte d'Azur) to Cannes, Grasse, Antibes and Nice.
