= Cannes station =

French railway station

Cannes
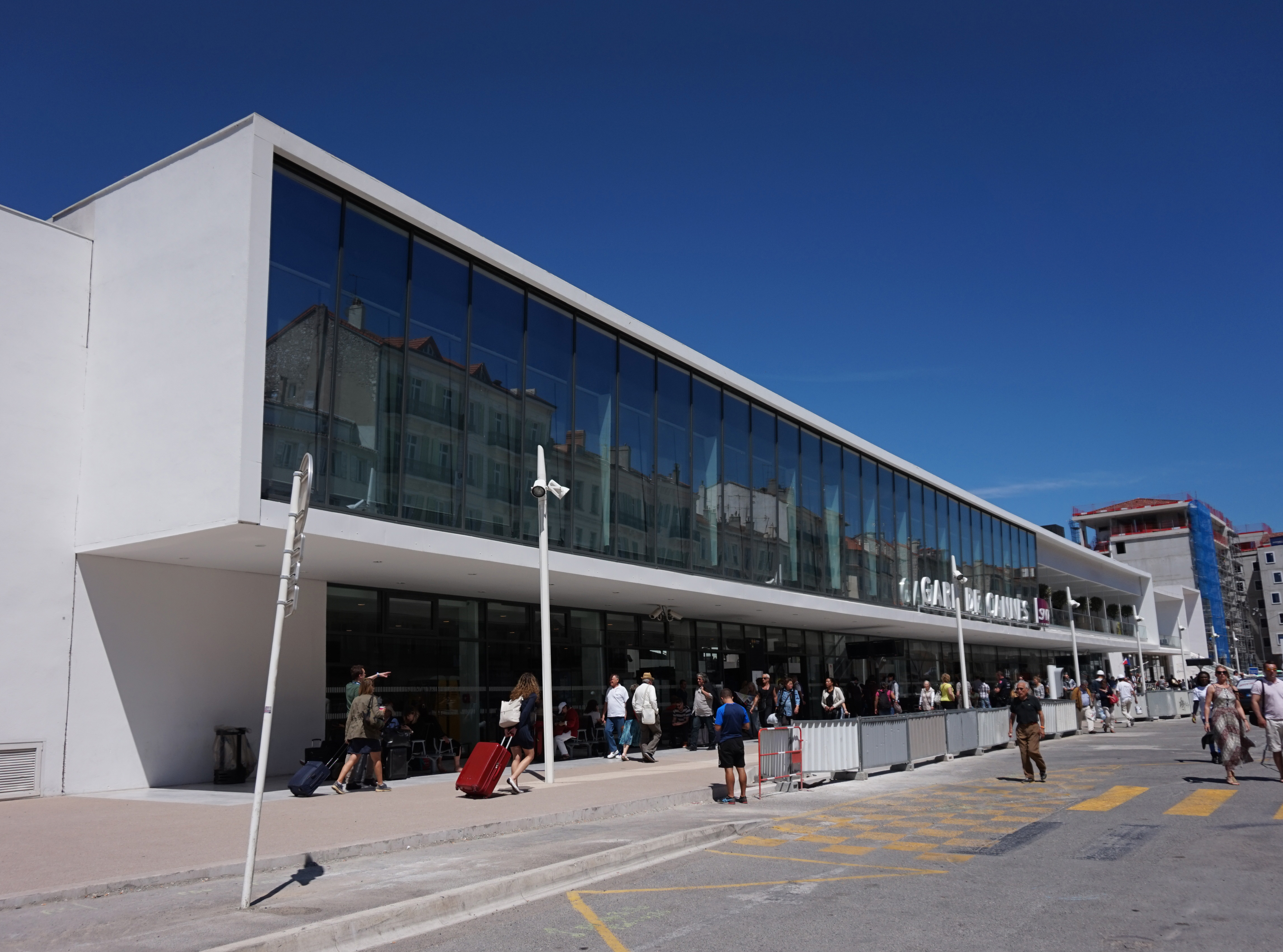
- Cannes station in 2015

General information
- Location: 4 Place de la Gare, 06400 Cannes; France
- Coordinates: 43°33′14″N 7°01′10″E
- Owner: RFF
- Operator: SNCF
- Line: Marseille–Ventimiglia railway
- Platforms: 2
- Tracks: 3
- Train operators: TER, Intercités

Construction
- Structure type: Ground

Other information
- Station code: 87757625

History
- Opened: April 10, 1863

Passengers
- 2024: 5,622,415
Services
Preceding station	SNCF	Following station
Saint-Raphaël-Valescure towards Paris-Lyon	TGV inOui	Antibes towards Nice-Ville
Saint-Raphaël-Valescure towards Nancy-Ville	TGV inOui	Antibes towards Nice-Ville
Saint-Raphaël-Valescure towards Lyon-Part-Dieu	TGV inOui	Antibes towards Nice-Ville
Saint-Raphaël-Valescure towards Paris-Lyon	TGV inOui Seasonal service	Antibes towards Menton
Saint-Raphaël-Valescure towards Paris-Austerlitz	Intercités (night)	Antibes towards Nice-Ville
Preceding station	Ouigo	Following station
Saint-Raphaël-Valescure towards Paris-Lyon	Grande Vitesse	Antibes towards Nice
Preceding station	TER PACA	Following station
Cannes-la-Bocca towards Les Arcs–Draguignan	3	Golfe-Juan-Vallauris towards Nice
Cannes-la-Bocca towards Mandelieu-La Napoule	4	Golfe-Juan-Vallauris towards Ventimiglia
Le Bosquet towards Grasse	4	Golfe-Juan-Vallauris towards Ventimiglia
Saint-Raphaël-Valescure towards Marseille	6	Antibes towards Nice
Location

Cannes station or Cannes-Voyageurs (French: Gare de Cannes) is the main railway station for the French Southern city of Cannes. It is situated on the Marseille–Ventimiglia railway.

== History ==
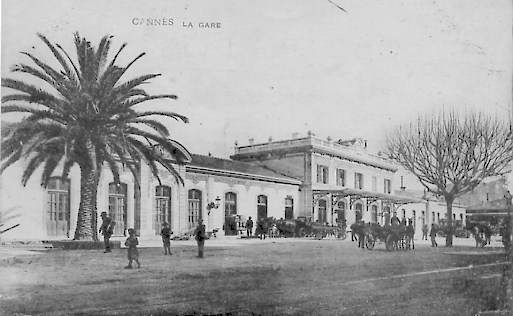
Gare de Cannes-Ville in 1880

The station opened on 10 April 1863 when the line from Marseille to Cagnes-sur-Mer opened to passengers. The station was a small elegant building with a rooftop spanning both tracks of the main line. In 1870 the line from Grasse is opened. The engine depot was moved to La Bocca in 1880 and a goods station opened in 1883. With the lengthening of trains, the old station proved to be too small for the growing town. Work on a new station started in 1962. The station building was subsequently replaced by the present structure in 1975. The line and the station platforms are, per 2023, now underground across most of the city center as it was covered by multi lanes city expressway.

== Train services ==
The station is served by the following services:

- High speed services (TGV) Paris - Avignon - Aix-en-Provence - Cannes - Antibes - Nice
- High speed services (TGV) Bruxelles-Midi - Lille-Europe - Airport Charles de Gaulle - Lyon - Avignon - Aix-en-Provence - Marseille - Cannes - Nice
- High speed services (TGV) Nancy - Strasbourg - Besançon - Dijon - Lyon - Avignon - Marseille - Cannes - Nice
- High speed services (TGV) Lyon - Marseille - Nice
- Regional services (TER Provence-Alpes-Côte-d'Azur) Marseille - Toulon - Les Arcs–Draguignan - Cannes - Nice
- Local services (TER Provence-Alpes-Côte-d'Azur) Les Arcs–Draguignan - Cannes - Nice
- Local services (TER Provence-Alpes-Côte-d'Azur) Grasse/Mandelieu - Cannes - Nice - Monaco - Ventimiglia

Please notice that this station, even served by TGV cars, is NOT high speed as the specific track, needed for high speed up to 320 km/h goes only to Marseilles St Charles station. All trains from Marseille to the Italian border (Menton) run at slow speed.

== Bus connections ==
The station is connected by many lines such as :

- Palm Bus: A B 1 2 4 6A 6B 7 9 10 12 21 22 35
- Envibus : 18
- ZOU06! : 81, 620, 660, 662, 663, 664

== See also ==
- Cannes-la-Bocca
- Cannes-Le Bosquet
- Cannes-Ranguin
