= Ranguin station =

Railway station in Cannes, France

Ranguin
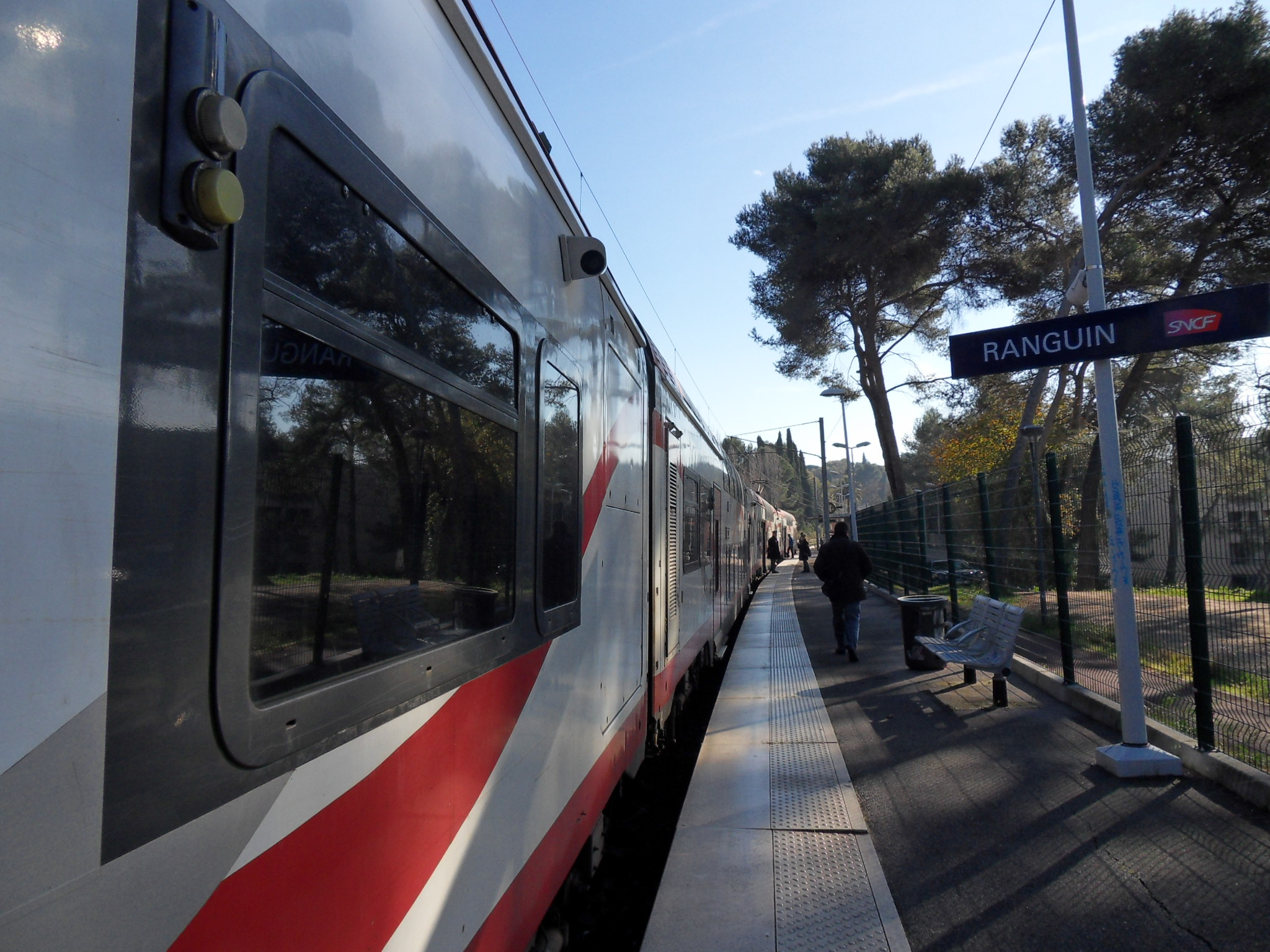
- Ranguin station (Alpes-Maritimes, France)

General information
- Location: Cannes, Alpes-Maritimes; Provence-Alpes-Côte d'Azur, France
- Coordinates: 43°34′9″N 6°58′9″E
- Operator: SNCF
- Platforms: 1
- Tracks: 1
- Train operators: TER

Other information
- Station code: 87757732

Services
Preceding station	TER PACA	Following station
Mouans-Sartoux towards Grasse	4	La Frayère towards Ventimiglia
Location

Ranguin station (French: Gare de Ranguin) is a French railway station in a suburb of Cannes, southern France.

The station opened in 1871 when the line from Cannes to Grasse opened to passengers. The line saw a steady decline in passengers and the station was closed in 1995. After much work by the Comité pour la Réouverture de la Ligne SNCF Cannes-Grasse, the line and station were reopened in 2005 and the line was electrified.

== Services ==
The station is served by regional trains (TER Provence-Alpes-Côte d'Azur) to Cannes, Grasse, Antibes and Nice.

== Bus connections ==
The station is not connected with bus lines, excepted remotely :

- Palm Bus: 1 17 26 35 R5 at Saint-Pierre.

== See also ==
- List of SNCF stations in Provence-Alpes-Côte d'Azur
