= Palm Bus =

Public bus service in the south of France

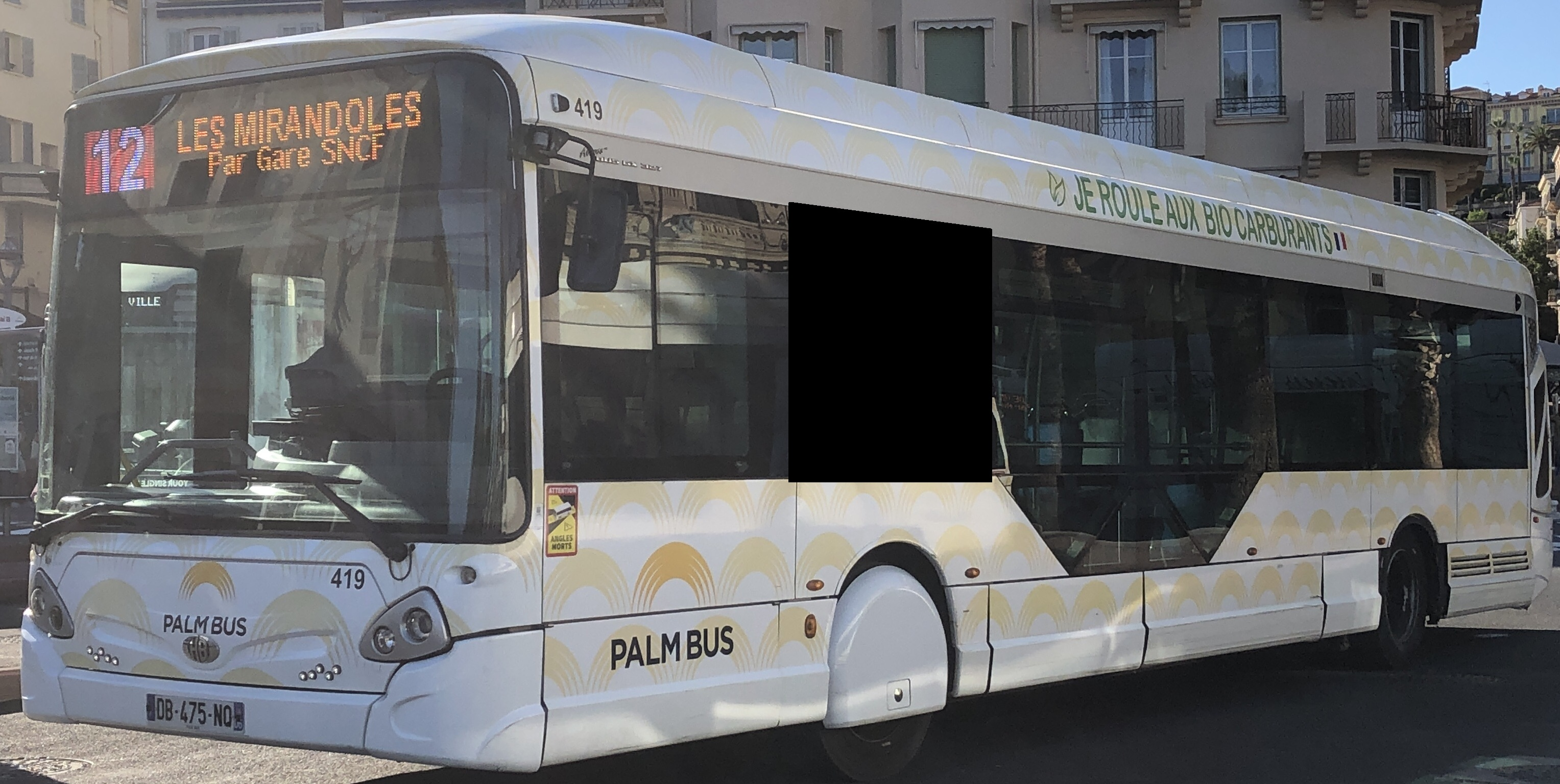
- Heuliez GX 327 BHNS n°419 operating a service on the line 12, awaiting his passengers on his terminus, Hôtel de Ville.
- Headquarters: Cannes
- Locale: Cannes
- Service area: France
- Service type: Bus rapid transit
- Routes: 46
- Operator: Régie Palm Bus
- Website: https://palmdeplacements.fr/en/

Palm Bus is a brand of bus services serving the Southern French city of Cannes, France. The operator, Veolia Transport Cannes is responsible for operating the Bus Azur buses for SITP, grouping the communes of Cannes, le Cannet et Mandelieu-la-Napoule, Théoule-sur-Mer and Mougins.

== History ==
=== 1933–2014: Cannes buses history ===
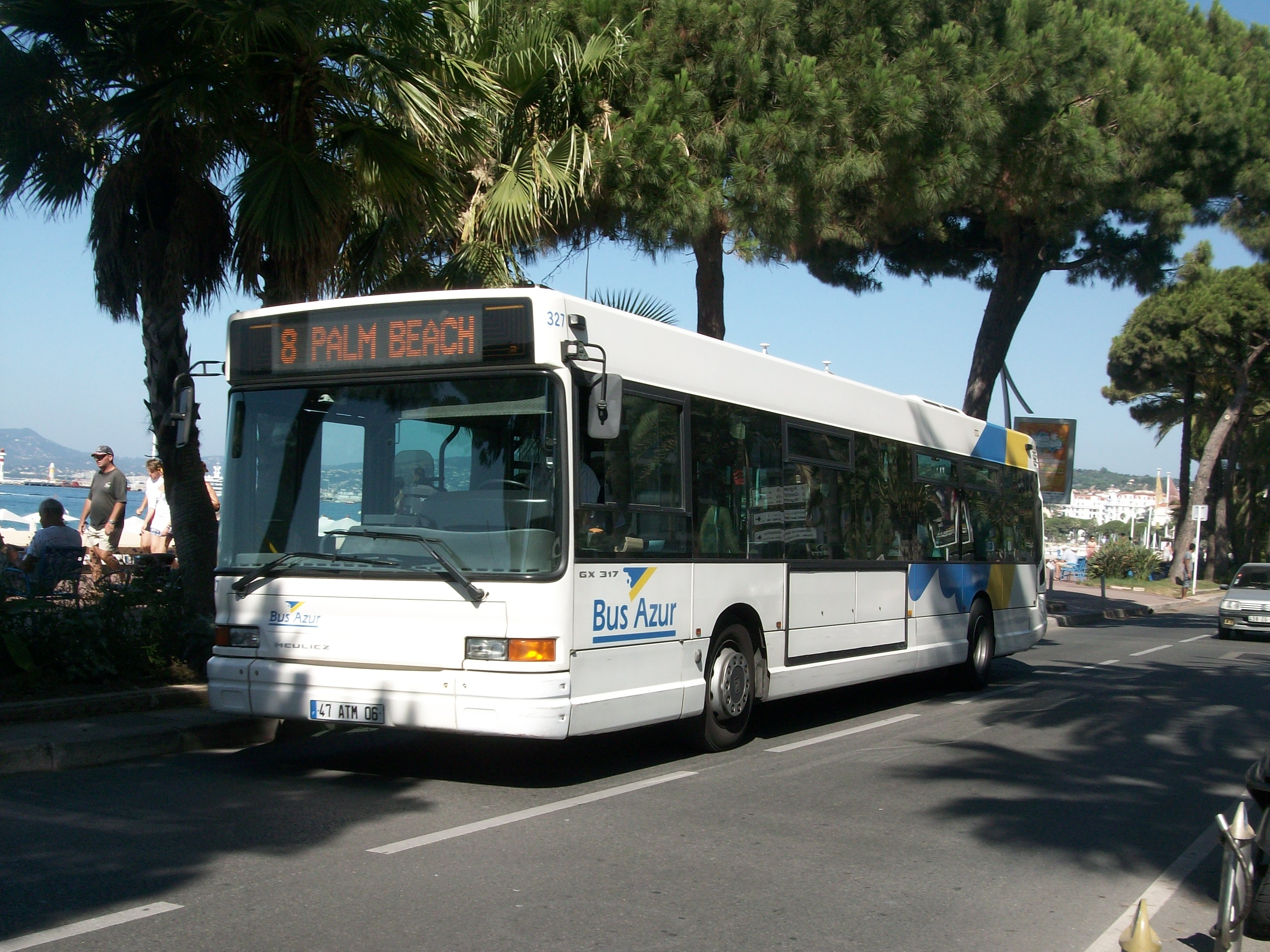
A now-retired Heuliez GX 317 vehicle from Bus Azur running on Palm Impérial (or Route 8).

The city of Cannes was, until 1933, served by an urban tramway system, the Tramway de Cannes, as well as an inter-urban tramway, the Tramway de Nice et du Littoral until 1953.

The first bus services within Cannes and between Cannes and Le Cannet began in 1936. Cannes bus company operated four lines:

- Cannes to Le Cannet
- Cannes to Le Cannet Rocheville
- Cannes to Cannes-la-Bocca
- Cannes to The Croisette

Each of the lines were divided in two fare zones. In 1954, the concession for operation of buses in Cannes was given to Société des Transports Urbains de Cannes by the Syndicat Intercommunal des Transports Publics for twenty years. Several lines were created during the 1960s, linking Cannes to la Californie, Cannes and le Cannet via République and Cannes to l'Aubarède. Lines were divided into four fare zones. In 1968, severe strikes forced the company to reduce its staff presence on buses to one.

The STUC's concession was extended by ten years in 1974 thanks to a grant to the STIP. The company adopted a new ticketing system, using magnetic strip cards. Lines were grouped into two global fare zones in replacement of the four per line. Service was increased with the purchase of more rolling stock. Within two years, stock and staff numbers doubled.

In 1978, the STUC purchased a diesel multiple unit X 94630 for use on the Cannes-Ranguin railway line. Service was eleven minutes in length and bus ticketing used.

The concession was once more extended, for five years, in 1984, with further bus purchases and the repainting of the X 94630 into the line's colours. rail services ended in 1995 due to loss of revenue. On 5 November 1996, CGFTE Cannes signed a contract delegating services. In 2004, Bus Azur introduced double-decker buses on its line 8 quai Laubeuf-La Croisette-Palm Beach.

=== 2014–2018: New network ===
On 1 January 2014, Bus Azur is extended to Mougins and Théoule-sur-Mer and officially becomes Palm Bus.

Palm Bus network is changed: Sillages lines 24 and 27 are transferred to Cannes network, three lines named 22, 23 and 30 were created and departmental line 620 was transferred.

=== 2018–2022: New buses ===
Since mid-2010, Palm Bus started receiving new articulated and electric Heuliez buses :

- In 2018, Palm Bus received their first Heuliez Bus GX 337 Linium prototype.
- In end-2019, Palm Bus received their first three-articulated buses, (GX 437 Linium).
- In 2021, Palm Bus received their first electric buses.

=== 2022–present: New buses lines ===
On 1 September 2022, Sillages line 18 were transferred to Cannes network.

In September 2023, the network get into a high changement.

- Three new lines named 26, 28 and 29, serving Cannes, Mougins, Valbonne and Sophia-Antipolis
- Line 27 were deleted.
- Line 25 becomes a scholar line and renamed Renfort 5

== Routes ==
Image	Bus	Between	And
Express lines
	A	Mandelieu-la-Napoule – Centre Commercial Minelle	Gare de Cannes
	B	Mouans-Sartoux — Centre	Gare de Cannes
Other lines
	1	Le Cannet — Penh Chai	Cannes — Ranguin
	2	Le Cannet — Blanchisserie	Cannes — Les Bastides
	4	Le Cannet — Place Leclerc	Cannes — Hôtel de Ville
	6A / 6B	Le Cannet — Le Colombier; Cannes — Saint-Michel Collines	Cannes — Hôtel de Ville
	7	Cannes — Mare Monte	Cannes — Polyclinique
	7A *	Cannes — Hôtel de Ville	Cannes — Villa Pont de Veyre
	8	Cannes — Quai Laubeuf	Cannes — Palm Beach
	9	Gare de Cannes	Vallauris — Fournas
	10	Le Cannet — Les Pins Parasols	Cannes — Hôtel de Ville
	11	Le Cannet — Penh Chai	Cannes — Gabians
	11A	Le Cannet — Mairie	Le Cannet — Les Pins Parasols
	12	Le Cannet — Mirandoles II	Cannes — Hôtel de Ville
	13 *	Le Cannet — Place Leclerc	Le Cannet — Les Collines
	14	Cannes — Gare du Bosquet	Cannes — Gabians
	17	Cannes — Simone Veil Hospital	Mandelieu-la-Napoule — Gare Routière
	18	La Roquette-sur-Siagne — Hameau Saint-Jean	Mandelieu-la-Napoule — Gare Routière
	19	Saint-Raphaël — Le Trayas; Théoule-sur-Mer — Mairie	Mandelieu-la-Napoule — Gare Routière
	21	Cannes — Hôtel de Ville (circular line, via Notre-Dame-des-Pins and Gare SNCF)	
	22	Saint-Raphaël — Le Trayas; Théoule-sur-Mer — Mairie	Gare de Cannes
	23	Mandelieu-la-Napoule — Parc d'activités de la Siagne	
	24	Le Cannet — Place Leclerc	Mougins — Place des Acades
	26	Mougins — Tournamy	Cannes — Ranguin
	28	Mougins — Tournamy	Mougins — Mairie Annexe de l’Aubarède
	29	Mougins — Tournamy	Valbonne — Gare Routière
	35	Gare de Cannes	Cannes — Ranguin (via Le Cannet and Rocheville)
Circular lines
	CP (Note: City Palm)	Gare de Cannes	
	NS (Note: Navette du Suquet)	Cannes — Hôtel de Ville	
	PM (Note: Navette de la Presqu'île-Montfleury)	Pont des Gabres	
Summer lines
	LT (Note: La Littorale)	Mandelieu-la-Napoule — Espace Muller	Mandelieu-la-Napoule — Port de la Rague
	MP (Note: Mimo Plage)	Mandelieu-la-Napoule — Canadière-Tassigny	Mandelieu-la-Napoule — Cannes Marina
	BC (Note: Bocca Cabana)	Cannes La Bocca — Résidence Coubertin (circular line, via La Bocca-Verrerie, Place du Marché and la Roubine)	
	MR (Note: Mouré Rouge)	Cannes — Parking Roseraie-Port Canto (circular line, via Base Nautique and Plage de l'Étang))	
Night lines
	N10	Le Cannet — Les Pins Parasols	Cannes — Hôtel de Ville
	N20	Cannes – Boulevard du Midi	Gare de Cannes (via Centre Commercial Minelle, Gare Routière and Hôtel de Ville)
	N21	Cannes — Hôtel de Ville (circular line, via Palm Beach, Notre-Dame-des-Pins and Gare SNCF)	

Legends

#	Text
*	Only on-demand route
