= Tenda line =

Railway line in Italy and France

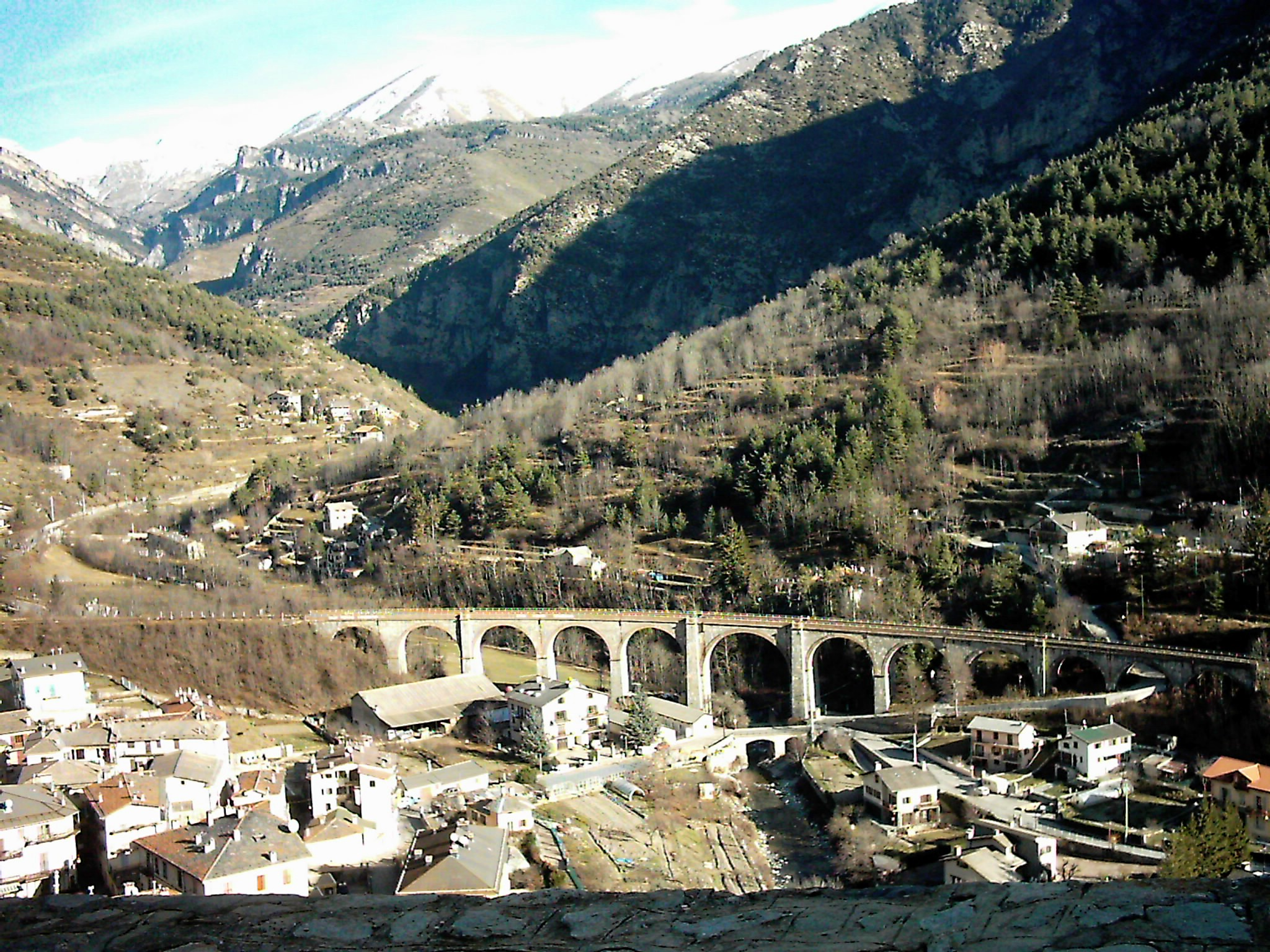
- A viaduct in the Col de Tende

Overview
- Other name: Cuneo-Ventimiglia line
- Owner: Rete Ferroviaria Italiana; SNCF
- Termini: Cuneo; Ventimiglia

History
- Commenced: 1856
- Opened: 18 July 1887
- Completed: 1928
- Closed: 1945 (Limone-Ventimiglia)
- Reopened: 1979 (Limone-Ventimiglia)

Technical
- Line length: 99.4 km (61.8 mi)
- Track gauge: 1,435 mm (4 ft 8 1/2 in) standard gauge
- Electrification: 3000 V DC (Cuneo - Limone)

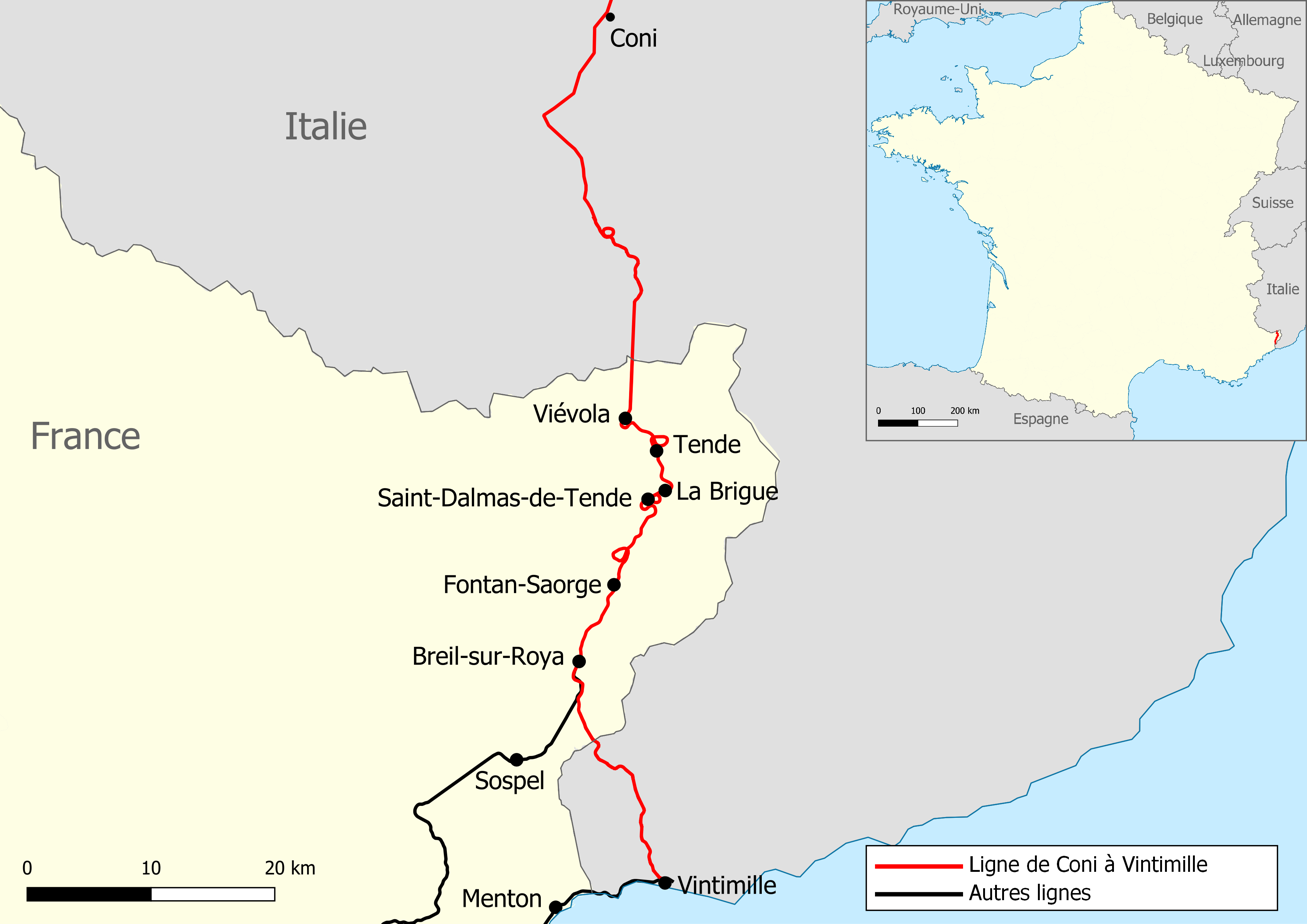
Map of the Tenda line.

The Tenda line or Cuneo-Ventimiglia line, also called in Italian: Ferrovia delle Meraviglie, lit. 'Railway of Wonders', is a cross-border railway line in the Alpine regions of France and Italy, connecting the Maritime and Ligurian Alps. The line is 99.4 kilometres (61.8 mi) long, including an 8-kilometre (5.0 mi) tunnel under the Col de Tende mountain pass.

The line connects Cuneo and Ventimiglia, both stations in Italy, but it passes through territory now belonging to France. This historical peculiarity is due to the fact that at the time of its design and construction, the route was located entirely within the Kingdom of Sardinia.

== Recognition ==
On 25 February 2021, the railway was named the winner of the tenth I Luoghi del Cuore, a competition run by the Fondo Ambiente Italiano (FAI), due to the richness and uniqueness of the landscapes in the territories it crosses. It also ranked first in the special category Italy above 600 meters.
