= Heuliez GX 437 =

French bus used in public transport

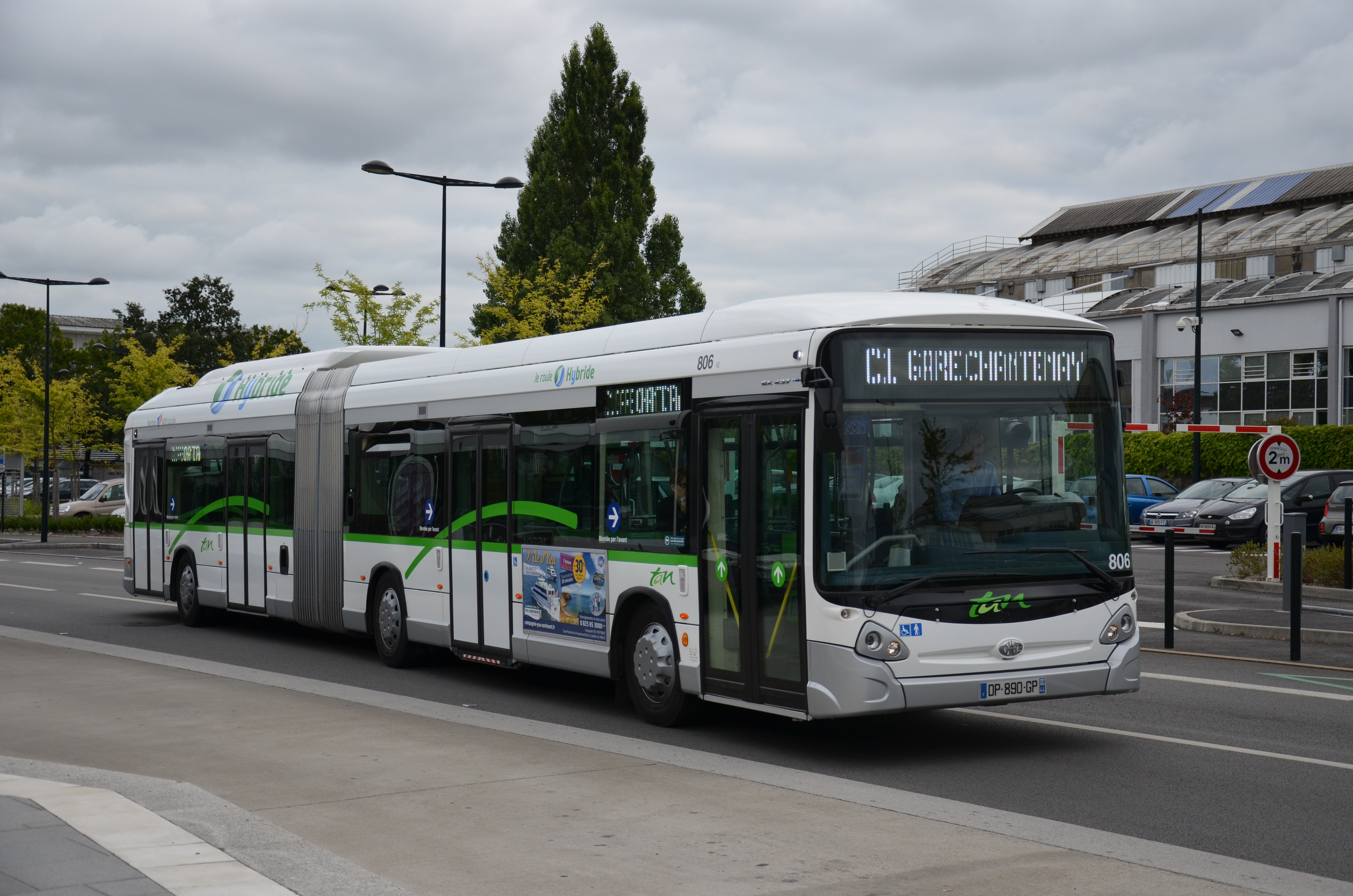
- Heuliez GX 437 Hybrid in France

Overview
- Manufacturer: Heuliez Bus
- Production: 2014–Present
- Assembly: Rorthais, Deux-Sèvres, France

Body and chassis
- Class: Integral
- Doors: 3 or 4
- Floor type: Low floor Low entry

Dimensions
- Length: 17,980 mm (58 ft 11.9 in)
- Width: 2,550 mm (8 ft 4.4 in)
- Height: 3,300 mm (10 ft 9.9 in)

Chronology
- Predecessor: Heuliez GX 427

The Heuliez GX 437 is a single-decker bus made by the French bus manufacturer Heuliez Bus designed for use in public transport, and is the articulated version of the Heuliez GX 337. The GX 437 is the successor to the Heuliez GX 427, which went out of production at the end of 2013. Diesel, Hybrid and Electric powered versions of the GX 437 exist.

Together with the GX 137 and GX 337 the Heuliez GX 437 forms a series called Access BUS 3rd generation.

== Design and characteristics ==
The bus was designed on a Iveco Bus Urbanway 18-chassis. As a result, the bus has the same properties as the Iveco Bus Urbanway. In June 2014, it was presented at the European Mobility Exhibition at Villepinte Exhibition Center. Three-door and four-door versions of the bus exist.

The electric busses are equipped with a 160/200 kW electric traction motor and with an energy & power Li-ion NMC battery system (250 kWh). The bus can run 120 km on a single charge and can optionally be recharged with an on-board pantograph, but conventional or a mix of both charging options are also available.

In addition to the standard region-/city bus design the bus is also available in a HOV/BRT (Bus Rapid Transit)-design, which is being marketed as the "GX LINIUM" series.

== Production ==
All Heuliez GX 437 are built at the Heuliez Bus factory in Rorthais, Deux-Sèvres, France. In the future only the electric version will be produced, production of the diesel version will be phased out.

== Operators ==
The Heuliez GX 437 is used primarily in Europe, mainly by French public transport companies.

In The Netherlands electric versions of the bus are operated by Qbuzz in Utrecht and Groningen, In Norway the electric version is used in Trondheim since 2019.

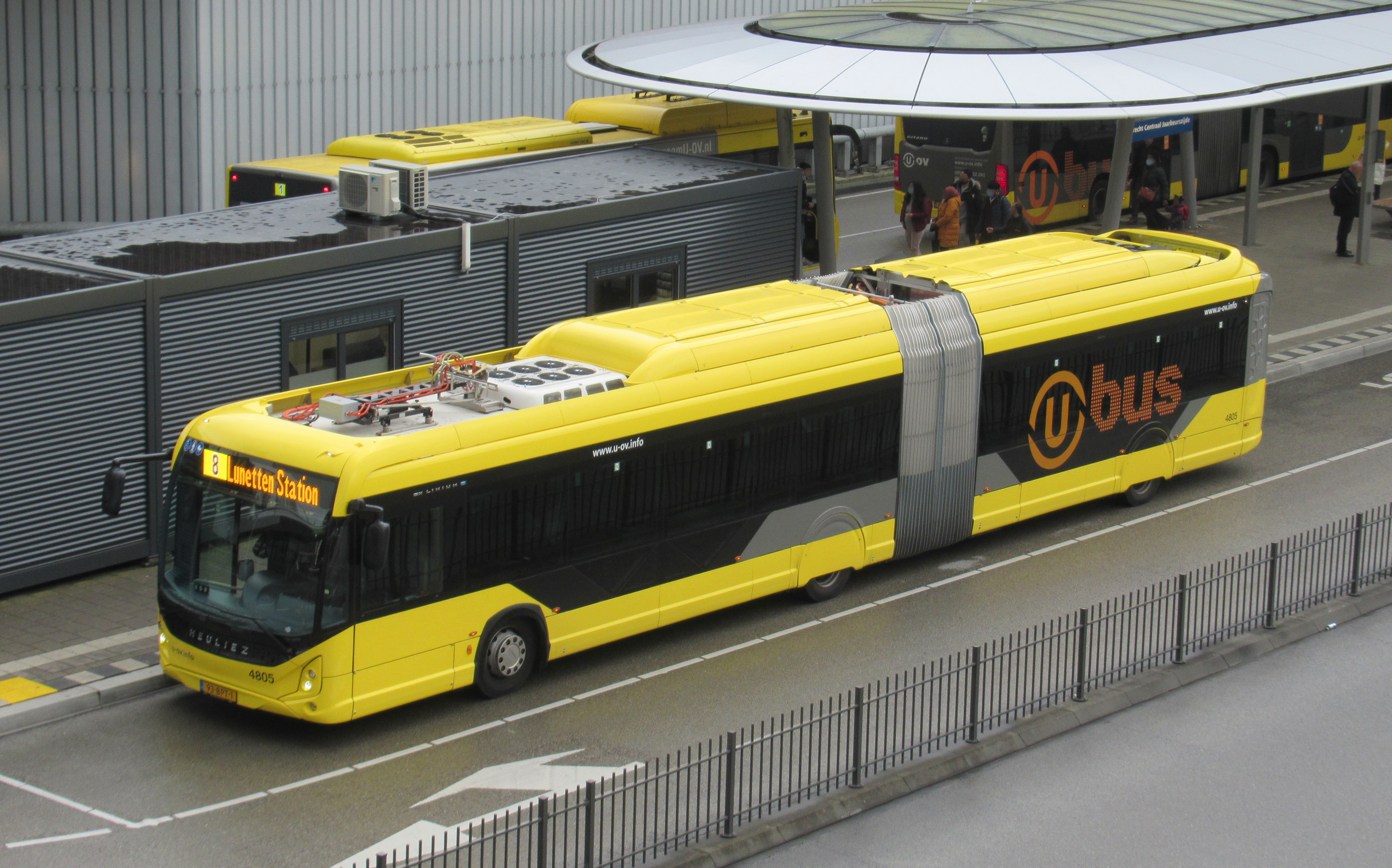
Heuliez GX437 ELEC of Qbuzz at Utrecht Centraal railway station

== Related types ==
- Heuliez GX 137
- Heuliez GX 337
