= Ventimiglia railway station =

Railway station in Italy

Ventimiglia
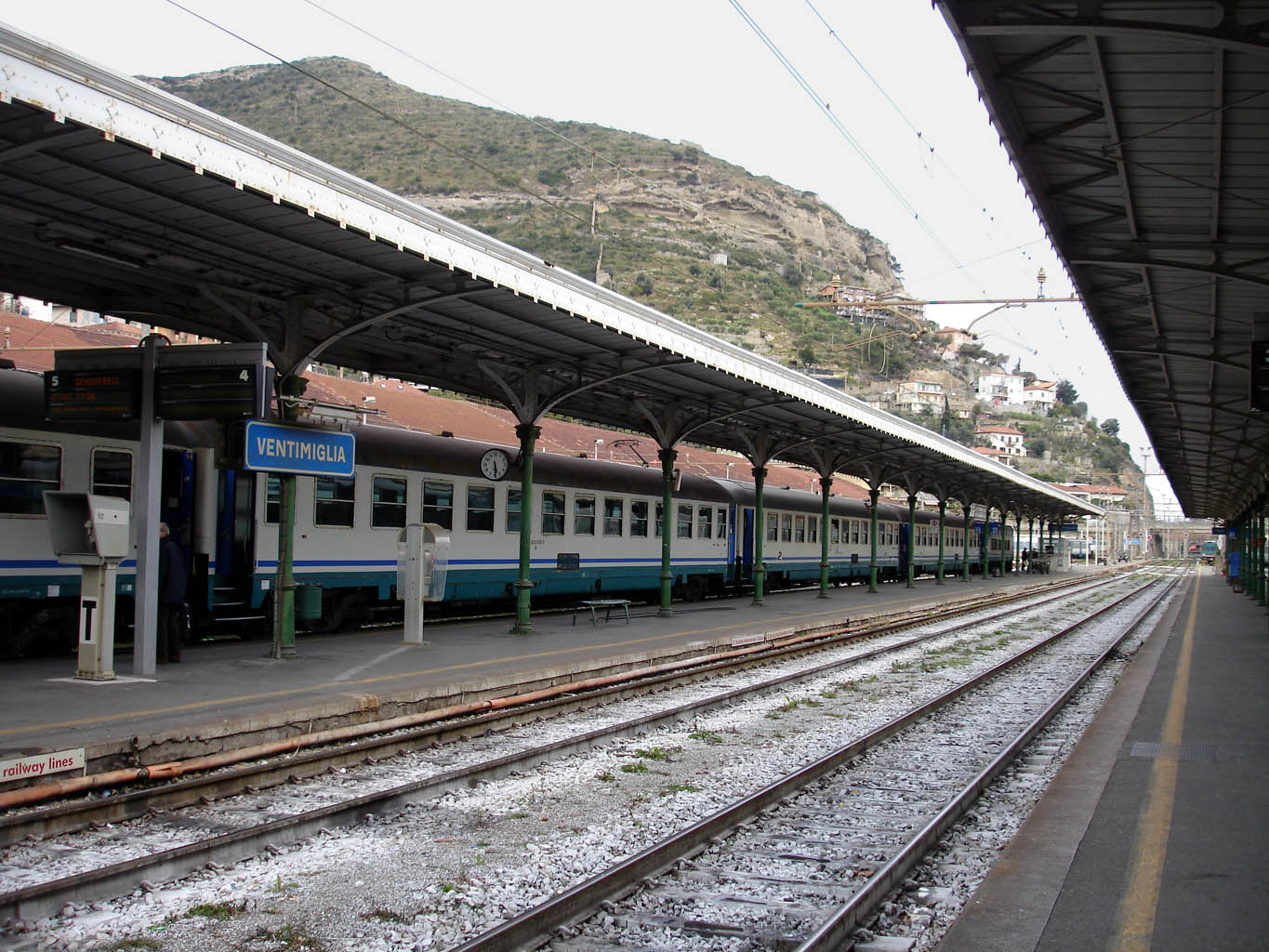
- View of the platforms

General information
- Location: Piazza Cesare Battisti; 18039 Ventimiglia IM; Ventimiglia, Imperia, Liguria; Italy
- Coordinates: 43°47′33″N 07°36′36″E
- Operator: Rete Ferroviaria Italiana; Centostazioni
- Lines: Genoa–Ventimiglia; Cuneo–Ventimiglia; Marseille–Ventimiglia
- Distance: 147.315 km (91.537 mi) from Genova Piazza Principe
- Platforms: 7
- Train operators: Trenitalia; SNCF

Other information
- Classification: Gold

History
- Opened: 1871; 155 years ago

Other services
Preceding station	TER PACA	Following station
Menton-Garavan towards Mandelieu-la-Napoule or Grasse	4	Terminus
Location
- Location within Liguria Location within Northern Italy Location within Italy

Ventimiglia railway station (Italian: Stazione di Ventimiglia) is the main station in the Italian town of Ventimiglia. It is at the end of three rail routes: the Genoa–Ventimiglia line, the Cuneo–Ventimiglia line and the Marseille–Ventimiglia line. It plays an important role not only in rail transport in Liguria but also in Italy.

The station is managed by Rete Ferroviaria Italiana (RFI). However, the commercial area of the passenger building is managed by Centostazioni. Italian train services to and from the station are operated by Trenitalia. Each of these companies is a subsidiary of Ferrovie dello Stato (FS), Italy's state-owned rail company.

French train services to and from Ventimiglia are operated by the SNCF.

== Location ==
Ventimiglia railway station is situated in Piazza Cesare Battisti, just north of the centre of the city.

== History ==
The station was opened at the end of 1871 and renamed Ventimiglia International station in 1882, with the construction of a new passenger building with a glass roof over the tracks. This roof was later superseded by the current building, designed by the architect Roberto Narducci (who also designed 40 other Italian stations), which reflects, like other public buildings in Ventimiglia (especially the town hall and the gymnasium), the typical lines of Italian rationalist architecture.

== Overview ==
The station consists of seven through tracks for passenger services, all equipped with platforms and connections to an underpass. There are many sidings for storing passenger carriages and a locomotive shed.

Being a border station located about 9 kilometres (5.6 mi) from the border with France, passenger train operations have to be carefully managed, taking into account the handover of operations between the Italian and French railways. Trains depart from here to several parts of Italy and France (TER from Cannes and Grasse to Ventimiglia, InterCity from Ventimiglia to Milan and Rome).

Ventimiglia station is electrified at 1.5 kV DC. The Italian railway system is electrified at 3 kV DC, and the Marseille–Ventimiglia line is electrified at 25 kV 50 Hz AC. However, the locomotives operating on the line into France are multi-system because Marseille railway station is also electrified at 1.5 kV. The Italian trains operate in the station area at half power.

== Train services ==
The station is served by the following service(s):

- Intercity services Ventimiglia - Savona - Genoa - La Spezia - Pisa - Livorno - Rome
- Intercity services Ventimiglia - Savona - Genoa - Milan
- Regional services (Treno regionale) Ventimiglia - Savona - Genoa - Sestri Levante - La Spezia - San Stefano di Magra
- Local services (Treno regionale) Fossano - Cuneo - Breil sur Roya - Ventimiglia
- Local services (TER Provence-Alpes-Côte-d'Azur) Grasse/Mandelieu - Cannes - Nice - Monaco - Ventimiglia

== See also ==
- History of rail transport in Italy
- List of railway stations in Liguria
- Rail transport in Italy
- Railway stations in Italy
