= Chemins de fer de Provence =

French rail company

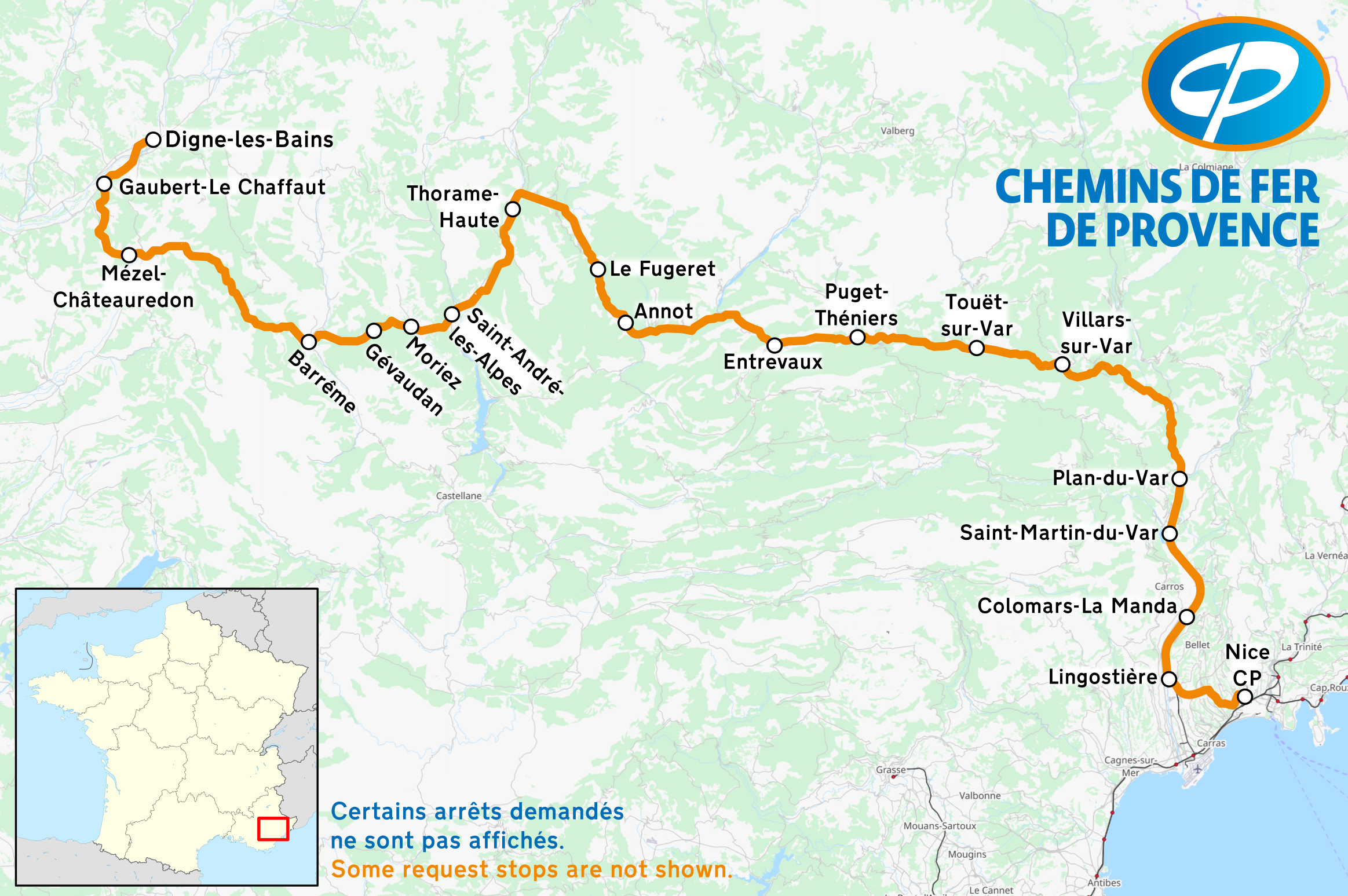
Map of the Nice–Digne line

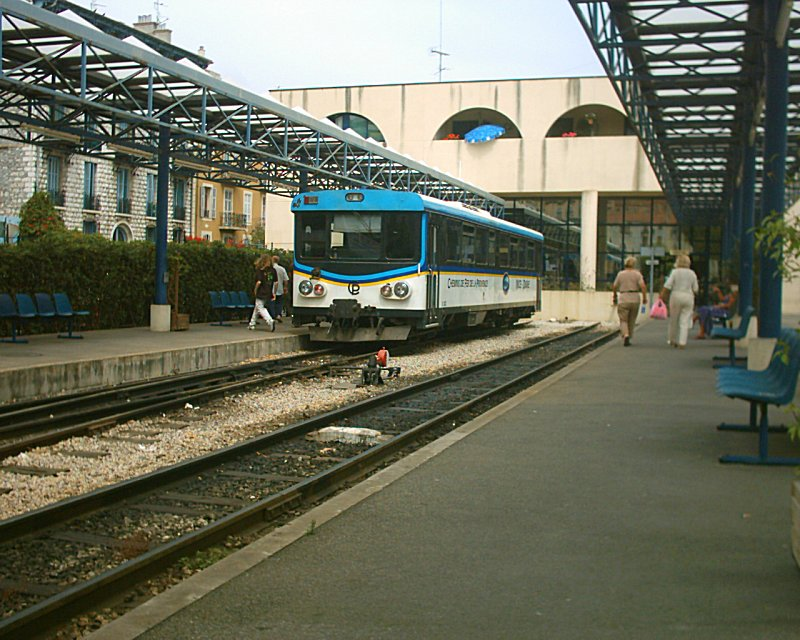
A Chemins de Fer de Provence train at Gare de Nice CP

The Chemins de Fer de Provence (French pronunciation: [ʃəmɛ̃ də fɛʁ də pʁɔvɑ̃s]) is a small rail company providing a daily train service between Nice and Digne-les-Bains in Provence. Their single remaining route, which dates from the 1890s and known locally as the Train des Pignes, is a metre-gauge railway, mostly single-track with passing loops at some stations. Between Pont-de-Gueydan and Saint-Sauveur-sur-Tinée the line runs through the valley of the Var. Most stops are upon request only and some do not have a built platform.

== History ==
Construction of the meter gauge line began in 1890 followed by a partial opening in 1892. Construction ended on 3 July 1911 and conceded to Sud-France. Lines from Nice stretched to Grasse, Puget-Théniers (opened in 1892), Digne (opened in 1911) and Annot.

After World War II, the line to Meyrargues closed and almost took the entire network with it. The Chemins de Fer de Provence closed the Gare du Sud in December 1991 and moved its terminating services to Nice CP.

On 5 November 1994 flooding of the river Var cut the line in several places and forced upon the line a total closure. A new bridge at Gueydan was built and the reopening of the line occurred on 12 April 1996.

The remaining line is 151 kilometres (94 mi) long. It comprises 27 tunnels, including the 3,457-metre-long (11,342 ft) Tunnel de la Colle Saint-Michel. The exit of the tunnel, Dignes-side, is at an elevation of 1,023 metres (3,356 ft).

The railway's terminus in Nice was until 1991 at Gare du Sud and since then Gare de Nice CP. The station is the terminus of a 1,000 mm (3 ft 3 3/8 in) (metre gauge) railway from Digne-les-Bains.

In Digne there was also a former railway line to Grenoble (standard gauge) operated by the SNCF. The SNCF had its own station building opposite the CP station.

In Digne the former station of the CP is no longer used. The narrow gauge track and the ticket service are moved to the former SNCF station building.

== Accidents and incidents ==
On 8 February 2014, a passenger train was struck by a falling boulder near Annot and derailed. Two people were killed and nine injured.

== Current operations ==
The railway line is not part of the Société nationale des chemins de fer (SNCF). It is owned by the Syndicat Mixte Méditerranée Alpes, SYMA, who received its concession for ninety-nine years in 1972. The SYMA is a grouping of several authorities (Provence-Alpes-Côte d'Azur, Alpes-Maritimes, Alpes-de-Haute-Provence, Nice and Digne-les-Bains). It is presided by Gérard Piel, vice-président of the Provence-Alpes-Côte d'Azur région and delegate of transport of Antibes. Service of the railway is assured by the CFTA, a subsidiary of Veolia Transport.

The workforce numbers 135.

=== Services ===
Passenger service is provided between Nice and Digne-les-Bains as well as a more frequent urban service between Nice and Plan-du-Var. Steam trains are operated during the summer season between Puget-Théniers and Annot. A postal service is also operated.

=== Maintenance ===
The main workshop for maintenance and repairs is in Nice-Lingostière. There are additional facilities at Puget-Théniers.

== Rolling stock ==
Currently the CP has the following rolling stock:

=== Steam Locomotives ===
No.	Wheels Arr.	Builders Details	Date Built	Date out of service	Notes.
E211	1B'C't	Henschell & Sohn	1923	In-service.	Ex-Portuguese National Railways locomotive. Works No. 19874

=== Diesel Locomotives ===
No.	Wheels Arr.	Builders Details	Date Built	Date out of service	Notes.
T61-T66	Bo'Bo'	B et L (Note: B et L: Brissonneau et Lotz)	1950	?	T66 was acquired from the Swiss Chemins de fer du Jura (CJ). Only T62 and T66 are still in service.
BB1200	B'B'	Henschel	1966	-	Acquired second-hand from Spanish FEVE. Former FEVE-class 1400. Rebuilt by CFD.
BB401, BB402	B'B'		1962	?	Diesel locomotive.
DU012, DU102	B	Matisa	1993	-	Draisine
11	B		1945	?	Shunter bought second hand from Chemin de Fer du Blanc-Argent (BA).
51	D		1948	?	Shunter
490	B	Berry	1957	?	Shunter

=== Diesel Railcars ===
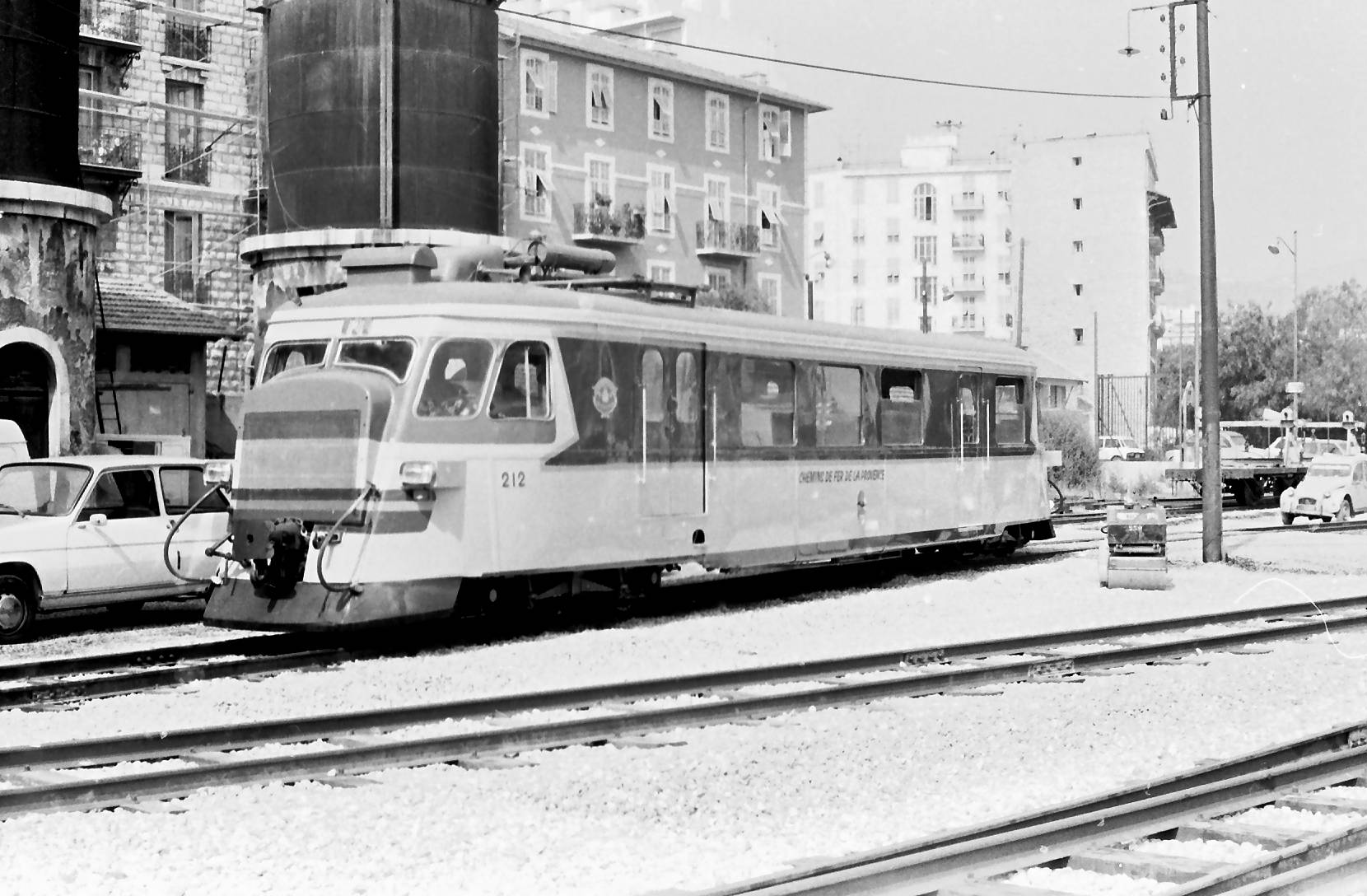
Railcar 212 in Nice Gare du Sud in 1983

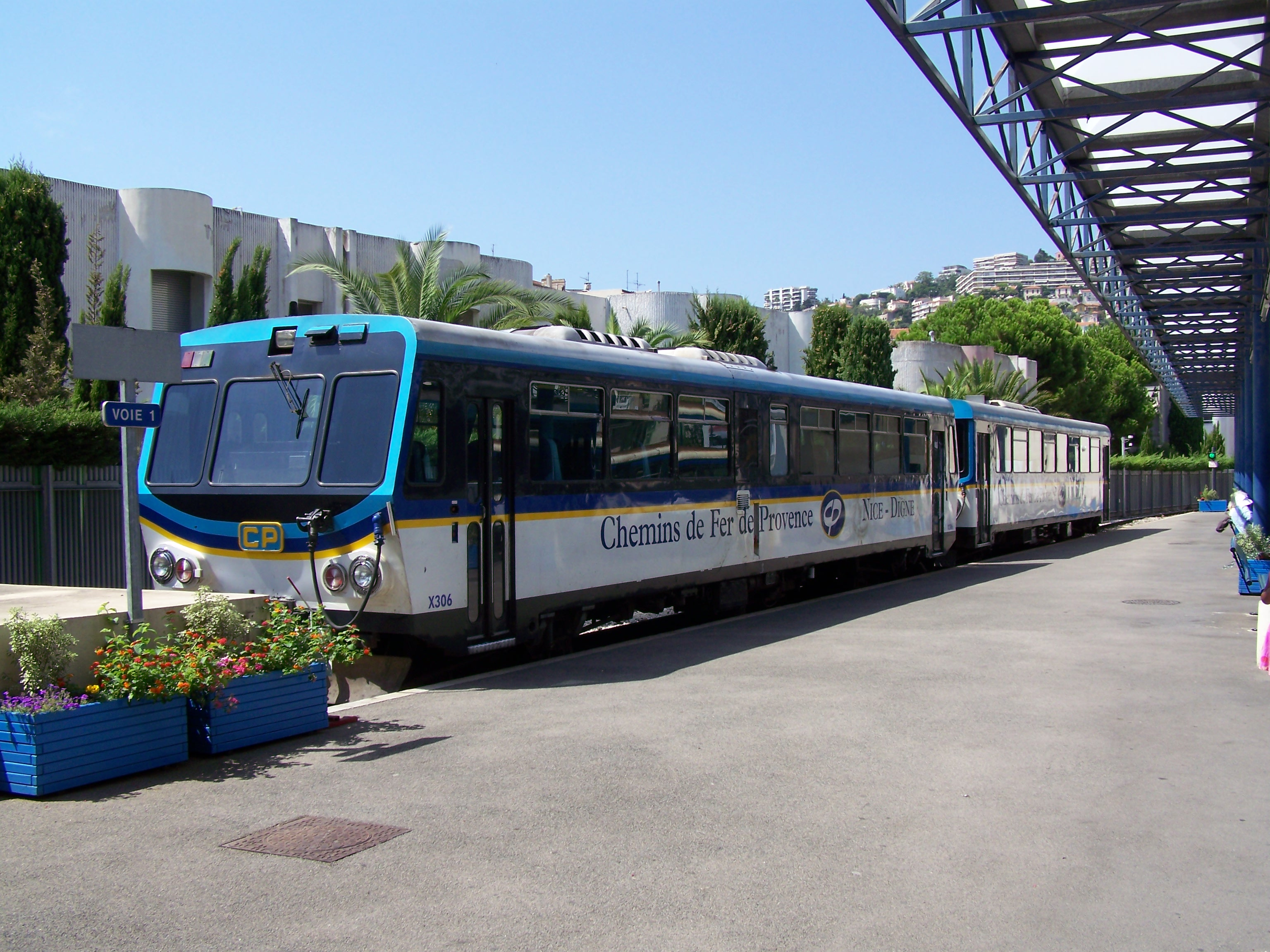
Railcar X306 in Nice

No.	Wheels Arr.	Builders Details	Date Built	Date out of service	Notes.
211-212		Billard	1939	?	Design A150D. Bought from C.F.D. du Vivarias in 1968. Class X200.
223-224		Billard	1939	?	Design A150D2. Bought from C.F.D. du Vivarias in 1968.
ZM1+ZR1-ZM10+ZR10		B et L	1935	?	For the section from Toulon to St. Tropez and St. Raphael. Sold to a railway in Spain.
ZM11+ZR11-ZM14+ZR14		B et L	1938	?	For the section from Toulon to St. Tropez and St. Raphael. Sold to a railway in Spain.
X301-X304		CFD (Note: CFD: Compagnie de Chemins de Fer Départementaux)	1971-1972	-	Numbered SY01-SY04 until 1984.
X305-X306		CFD	1977	-	Numbered SY05-SY06 until 1984.
X307		?	1975	?	Acquired from Chemins de Fer de Corse (CFC) in 2009. Original number X2003.
ZZ1-ZZ6		Renault	1935 (1-2), 1936 (3-6)	?	Class ABH1. ZZ2 and ZZ6 are still in service. Class X320.
ZZ7-ZZ12		Renault	1942	?	Class ABH5.
X351+X1351		Soulé-Garnéro	1984	-	Withdrawn in 2008 after a fire, but completely reconstructed by Safra in 2012 and returned to service.
		CFD-Bagnères	2010	-	4 ordered trainsets (DMU-2). Type AMP 800. Identical to AMG 800 of CFC.

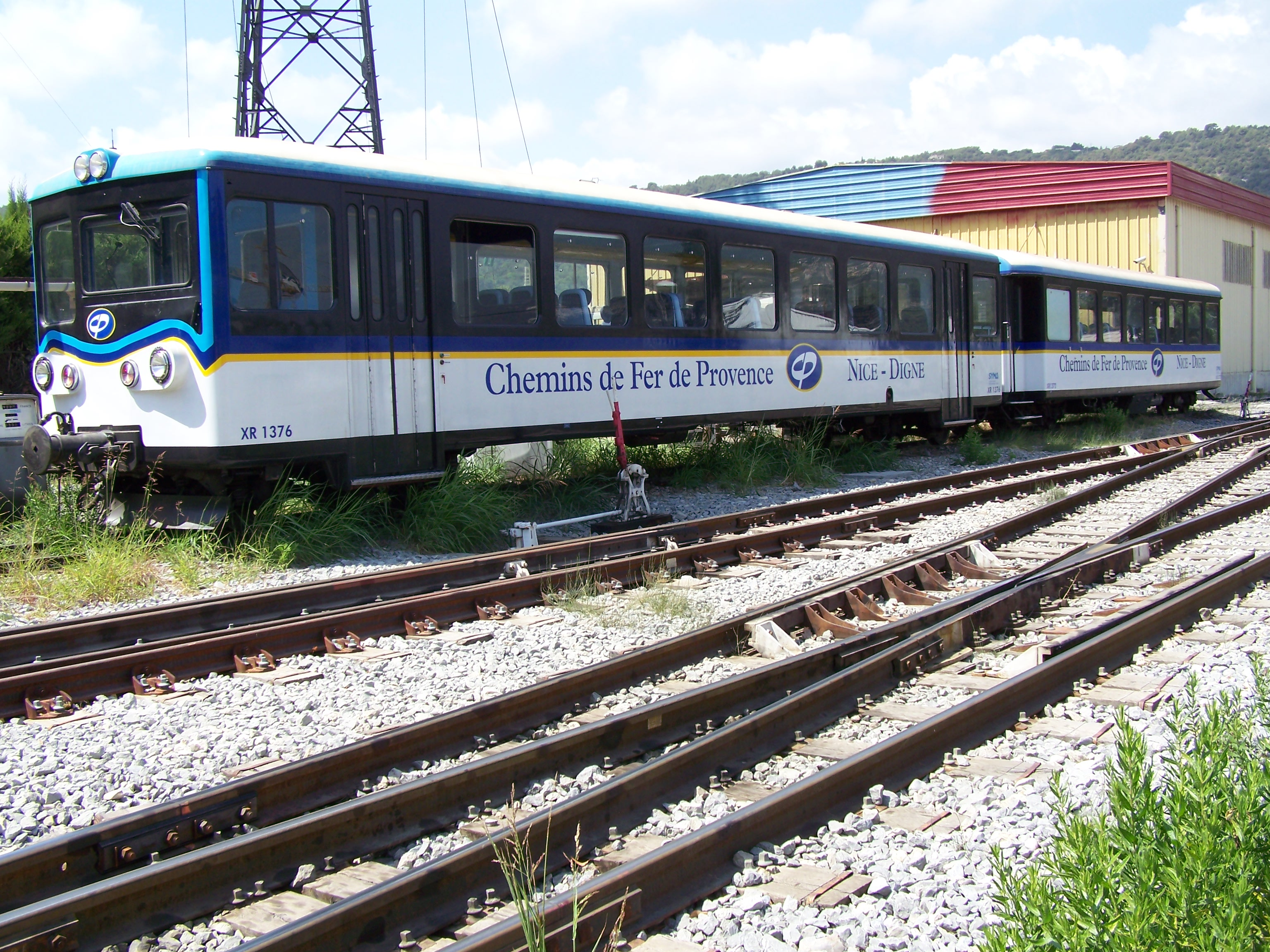
Railcar XR1376 in station Nice-Lingostière

=== Passenger cars ===
No.	Wheels Arr.	Builders Details	Date Built	Date out of service	Notes.
XR1331, XR1332		Billard	?		RL1-RL2 acquired in 1955. Design R210D2.
XR1333			?		RL3 acquired in 1959.
XR1334, XR1335			?		RL4-RL5 purchased from CFD du Tarn in 1964.
XR1336, XR1337			?		Rl6-RL7 were acquired from Vivarais in 1969.
XR1341-XR1344			1912	?	Originally numbered as A521-A524, later renumbered in AT1-AT4.
XR1371, XR1372			1948		Acquired from Appenzeller Bahn in 2004.
XR1376					Acquired from CJ.

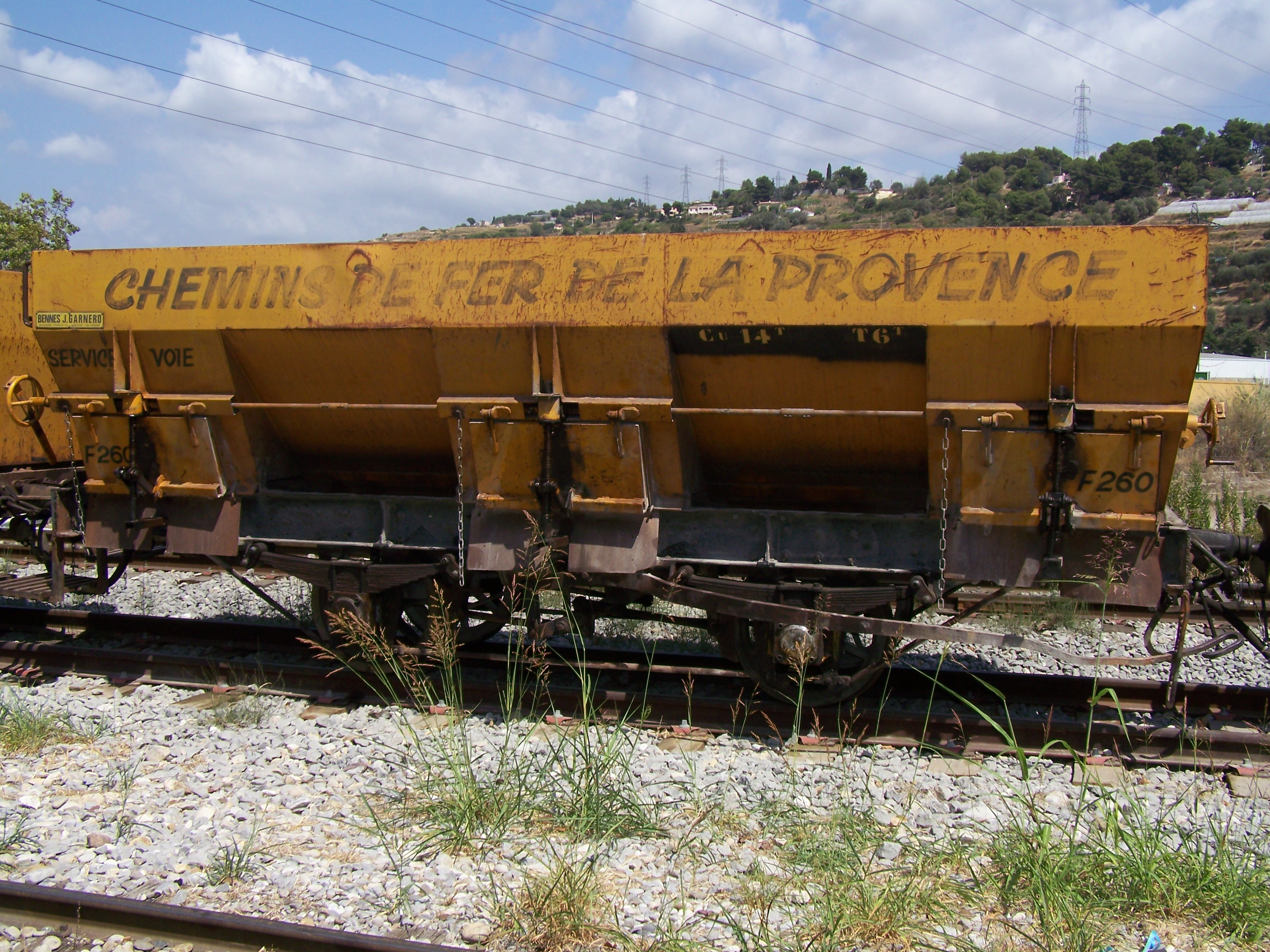
Hopper car F260 in station Nice-Lingostière

=== Freight cars ===
No.	Wheels Arr.	Builders Details	Date Built	Date out of service	Notes.
D 273, D 61					Closed car.
E 216, 221, 223, 226, 230	2				Open car.
F 259-263					Maintenance ballast car.
F 301-303					Maintenance ballast car.
G 205-214					Closed car.
K 233-238	2				Flat car.
L 239-246					Flat car.
R 247-254, 257					Flat car.
U 265					Special car.
U 267-270					Snow plough.
Y 271				.	Special car.

== Notes and references ==
Abbreviations:
