= Nice CP station =

Railway station in Nice, France

Coordinates: 43°42′32″N 7°15′34″E

Nice CP
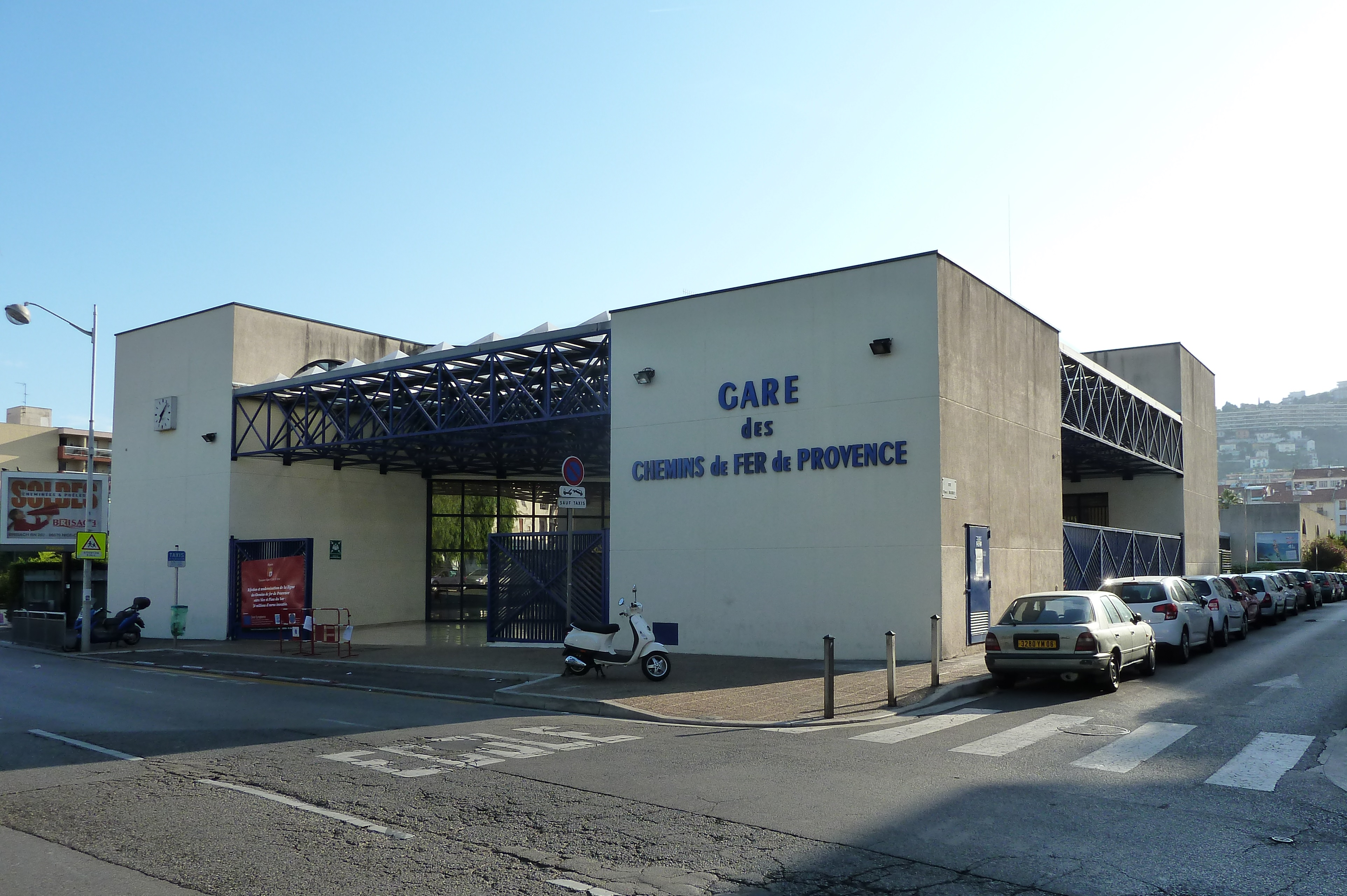
- The front face of the station

General information
- Location: 4 bis rue Alfred Binet; Nice; France
- Operator: Chemins de Fer de Provence
- Line: Nice–Digne les Bains

History
- Opened: 1991

Services
Preceding station	CFSF	Following station
Nice-Gambetta towards Digne	Digne–Nice	Terminus
Location

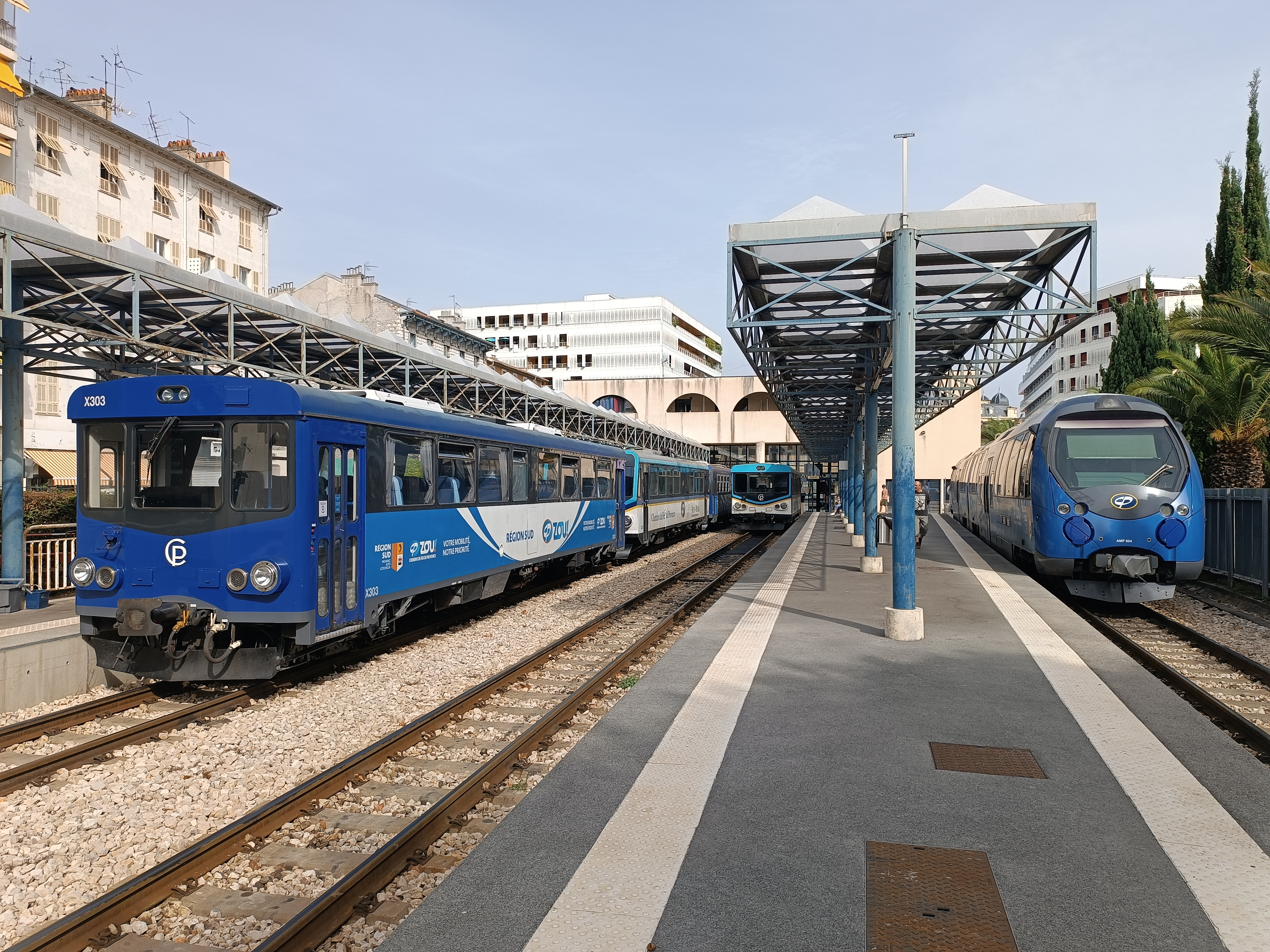
Diesel multiple units in the station's three platforms

Nice CP station (French: Gare de Nice CP) is a small French railway station in Nice, France. It is the terminus of the Train des Pignes line, a metre-gauge railway which runs from Digne-les-Bains station to Nice and is operated by Chemins de Fer de Provence. The station was opened in December 1991, replacing the old Gare du Sud station which had been built in 1890. The old station was sold to the council because it was in a poor state of repair and the council had redevelopment plans for the area, making repairs to the station not financially worthwhile.

The new station was built a few hundred metres up the line to allow Nice city council to redevelop the old station site into a retail, catering and leisure complex. The new station was built in a modernist style which contrasts with that of every other station on the route. It is served by the Nice tramway and city bus. The city's main railway station, Nice-Ville station, is a 10–15 minute walk away.
