= Gare du Sud =

Food court and former railway station in Nice, France

Coordinates: 43°42′34″N 7°15′44″E

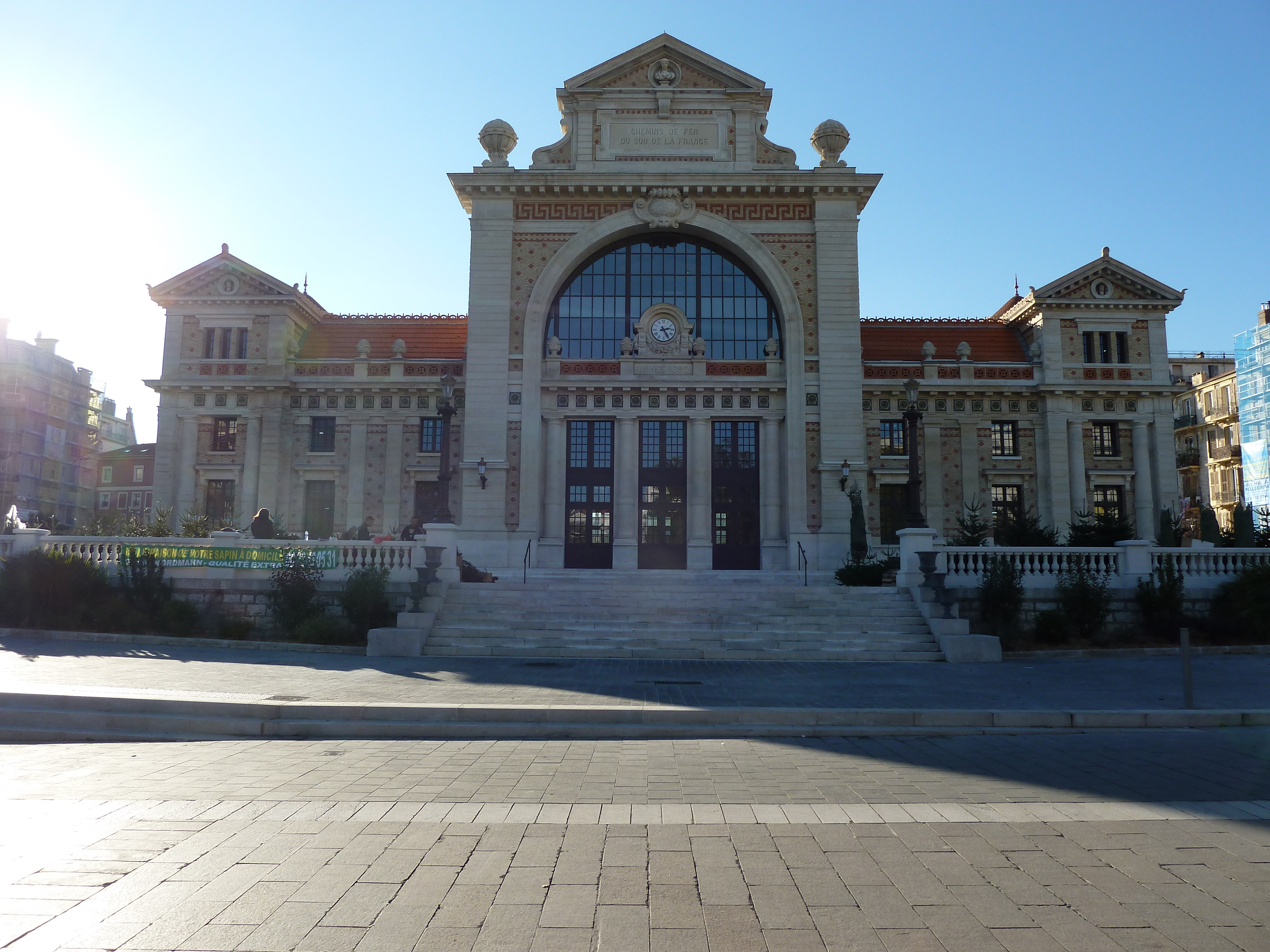
- The front face of the former station in December 2013

General information
- Location: Gare du Sud; Place de la Gare du Sud; Avenue Malausséna; 06000 Nice; Nice; France
- Owner: Commune de Nice
- Line: Nice–Digne les Bains
- Train operators: Chemins de Fer de Provence

Construction
- Architect: Prosper Bobin

History
- Opened: 1892
- Closed: 1991
Location

The Gare du Sud is a food court in the Libération quarter of the city of Nice in south-east France. It has been constructed within the buildings of the former railway station that bore the same name. The station was the terminus of the metre gauge railway of the Chemins de Fer de Provence rail company which links Nice to Digne-les-Bains in the department of Alpes-de-Haute-Provence. The line, known as the Train des Pignes because it follows a scenic route through the mountains, has been served by a nearby replacement Nice terminus station, the Gare de Nice CP station, since the original station was closed in December 1991. The Gare du Sud site then remained derelict until 2013, when the station building was renovated and converted into a library.

The remainder of the station site was subsequently redeveloped into a food court, shopping centre and cinema as part of project to regenerate the Libération quarter. The main entrance is through the train station's original, restored 19th-century facade.

== History ==
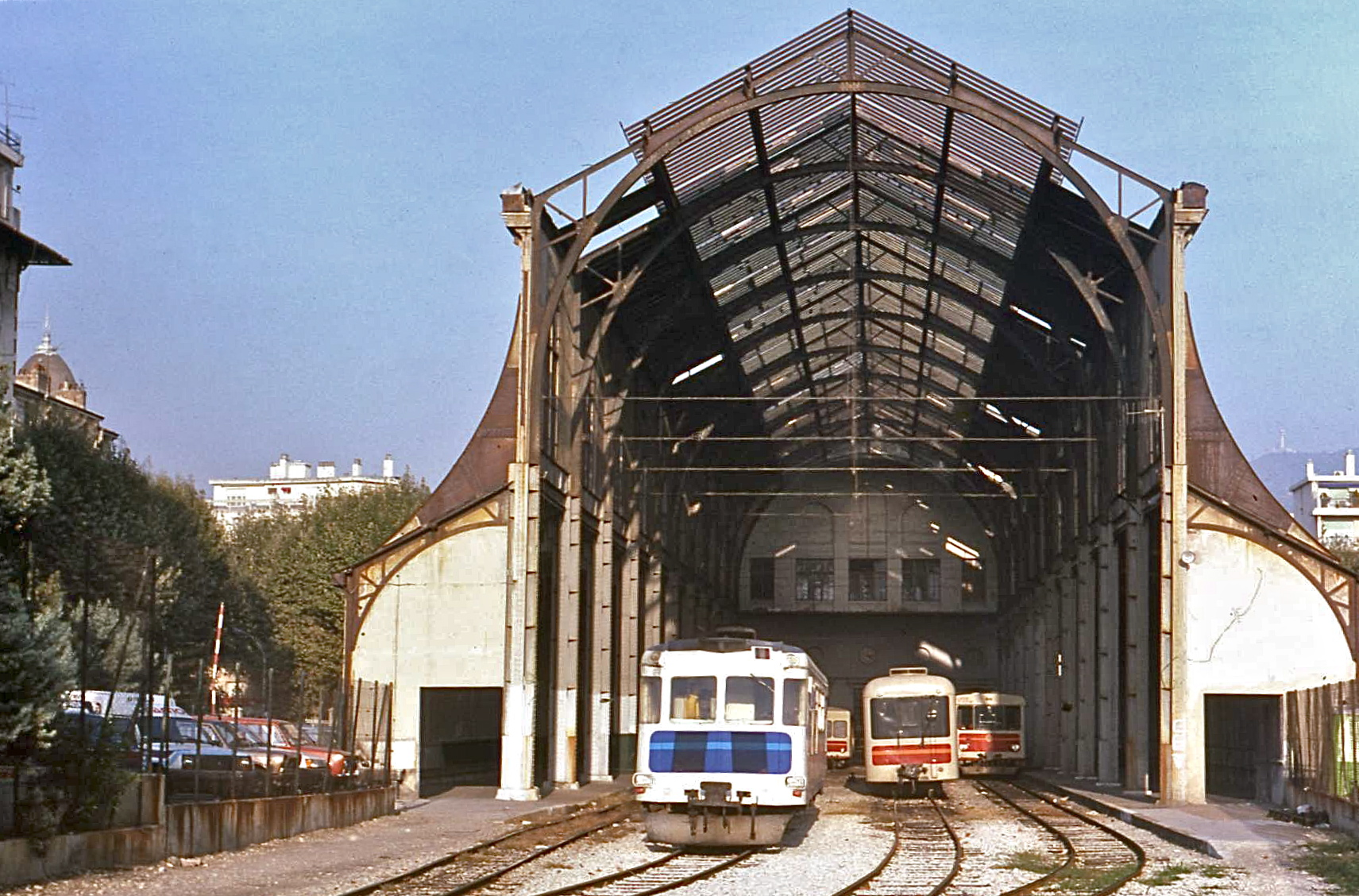
The Gare du Sud when it was still operating as a station in November 1989

The station was designed by architect Prosper Bobin for the Compagnie des Chemins de fer du Sud de la France and construction lasted from 1890 until June 1892. The station building, set back from the Avenue Malausséna, was designed in an elegant neoclassical style, and built at reasonable cost using new industrial materials. It had a monumental and imposing facade with a central high section flanked by two side pavilions, decorated with ceramic tiles, painted designs and picturesque stonework. Above this was a pitched roof with terracotta tiles, parapets and finials. The interior floor was marble. Behind the station building and contrasting with it was a tall metal train shed, 23 meters wide, 18 meters high and 87 meters long, with a glass roof to cover the platforms for Grasse and Puget-Théniers. The train shed was originally designed by Gustave Eiffel for the Russian and Austro-Hungarian pavilion at the Paris Exposition Universelle (1889), and was added to the station in 1891.

The station allowed farmers from the surrounding countryside to bring their goods into Nice to sell at the Libération market. Although lines to Digne and Annot were opened in 1911, the line to Meyrargues was closed after World War II leaving only the Nice-Digne service. The Gare du Sud was itself closed in December 1991 by its then operator, the Chemins de Fer de Provence. Terminating services for the line were moved a short distance upline to a small new station, Nice CP. Ownership of the old station was transferred from the state to the city of Nice in 2000 and there were plans to demolish the metal train shed and glass roof, and to dismantle the facade. Following public outcry, the Minister of Culture, Renaud Donnedieu de Vabres blocked the plan in 2004.

== Restoration and redevelopment ==
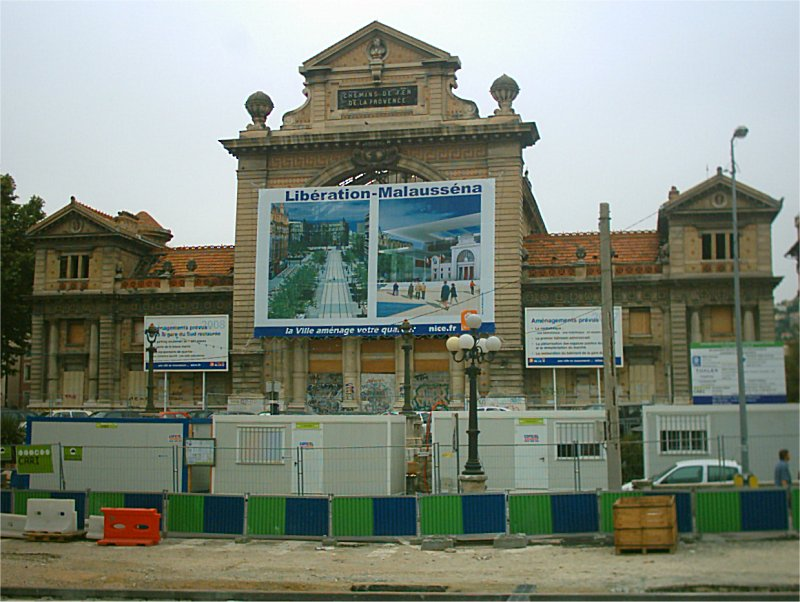
Nice's derelict Gare du Sud station, 2006.

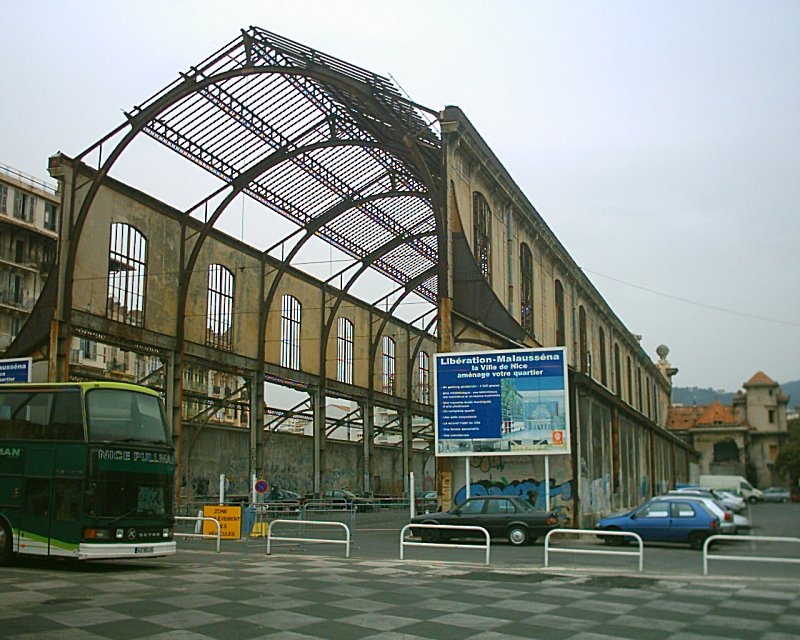
The back of Nice's derelict Gare du Sud station, 2006.

The facade of the old station building was listed as a historic monument in 2002 and the train shed was listed in 2005. Although the station had been saved, its future remained uncertain for some time and several projects were proposed. One was for a number of artistic associations which had no proper base to move into the building. Another was the controversial proposal to transfer Nice's town hall to the station site.

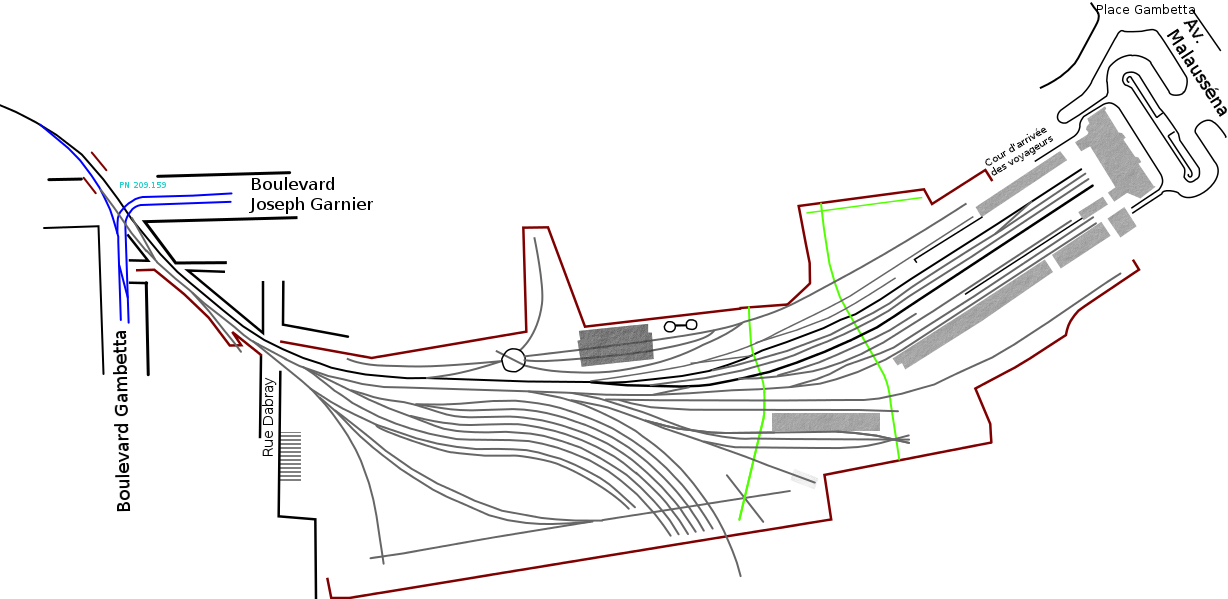
Plan of the station site

Following the failure of the 2000 demolition project, the town asked architect Pierre-Louis Faloci to create a new design which would preserve the entire passenger building as well as the metal train shed. His design proposed the erection above the station of a vast porch roof, a "shade", to be covered with 2000 square meters of electricity producing solar panels. The proposal also included the construction of a media library and sports complex, as well as the rehabilitation of the School of Fine Arts, and creation of a 1300-space parking lot. The design was approved by the Ministry of Culture on 12 May 2005.

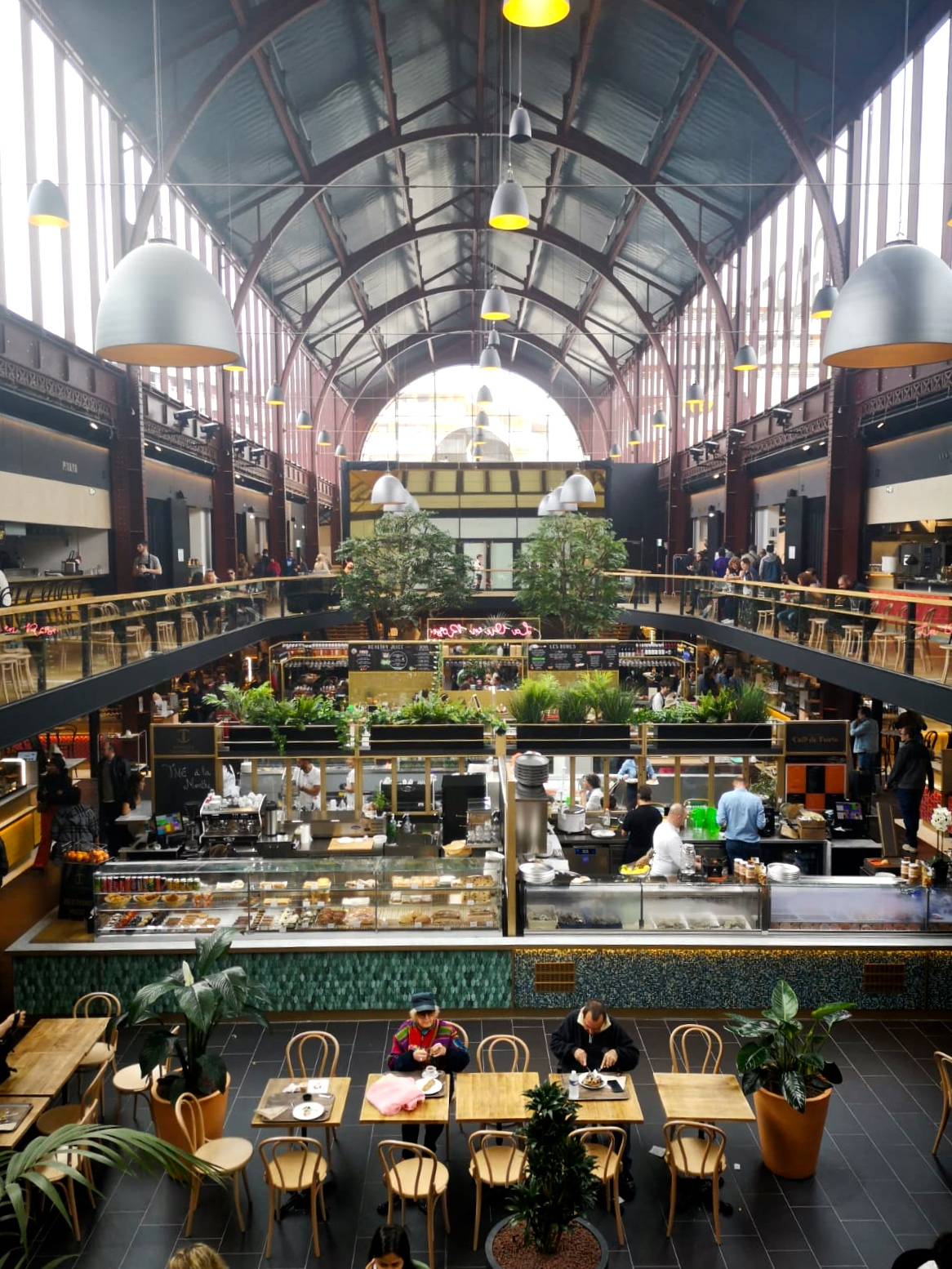
Interior of the Gare du Sud food court, 2019

The first phase of the project, the internal and external renovation of the station building, took place in 2013. Work was completed by December of that year and the building was re-opened on 4 January 2014. The new Raoul Mille library has been incorporated into the station's former waiting room and the building now houses multimedia rooms, meeting rooms and a climate-controlled storage basement. The second phase of the project involved the restoration of the train shed site. Plans were drawn up for a shopping centre, cinema, sports facilities, housing and underground car park, and the return of Gustave Eiffel's listed train shed. The plans were initially opposed by councillor Jean Claude Mari. However, he dropped legal proceedings in November 2014, allowing the city of Nice and the developers to begin work. The underground car park had been completed by the middle of 2016 and it was anticipated at that time that the renovation of the former train shed would be completed by 2017 with other facilities expected to open during the second quarter of 2018. The project won the Pyramide d'or, the highest award of the Fédération des Promoters Immobilisers in 2016. In March 2018, during ongoing redevelopment work, the main hall was temporarily opened to the public to house an exhibition by the Salon du Vintage. On 10 May 2019 it was confirmed that the hall's inauguration was scheduled for 17 May 2019 with its public opening on the next day. The restored train shed houses a food court with businesses selling food from the local region. A mezzanine at each end is linked to the ground floor by a wide staircase. Plans remain for the addition of a nightclub, fitness center, cultural center and offices.

== See also ==
- List of SNCF stations in Provence-Alpes-Côte d'Azur
- Chemins de fer de Provence
- Gare de Nice-Ville
- Nice tramway
