= Nice–Digne line =

Railway in France

Nice-Digne line
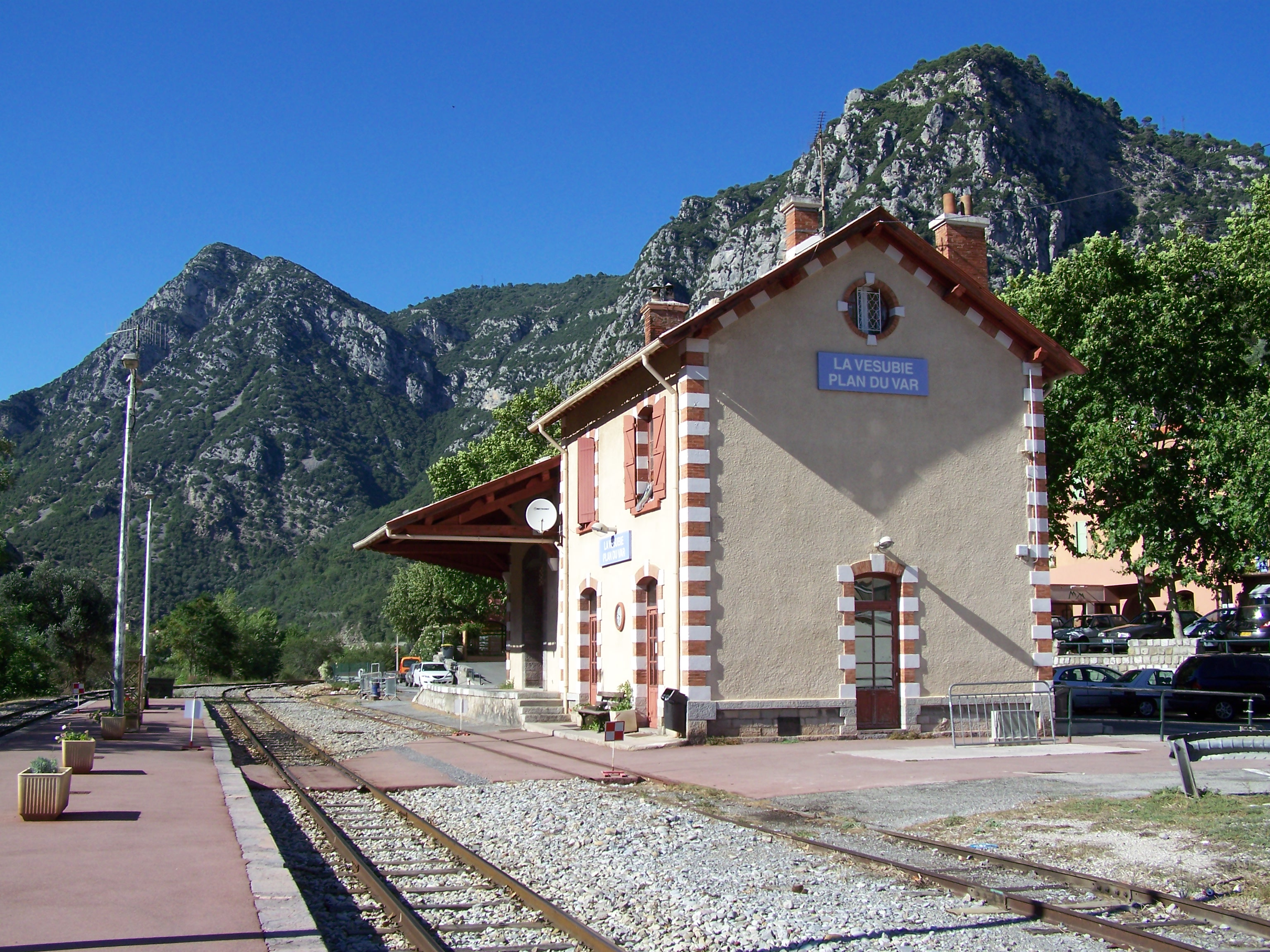
- Plan-du-Var Station

Overview
- Status: Operational
- Termini: Nice CP; Digne-les-Bains

Service
- Operator(s): Chemins de fer de Provence

Technical
- Track gauge: 1,000 mm (3 ft 3 3/8 in)
- Electrification: no
Route map
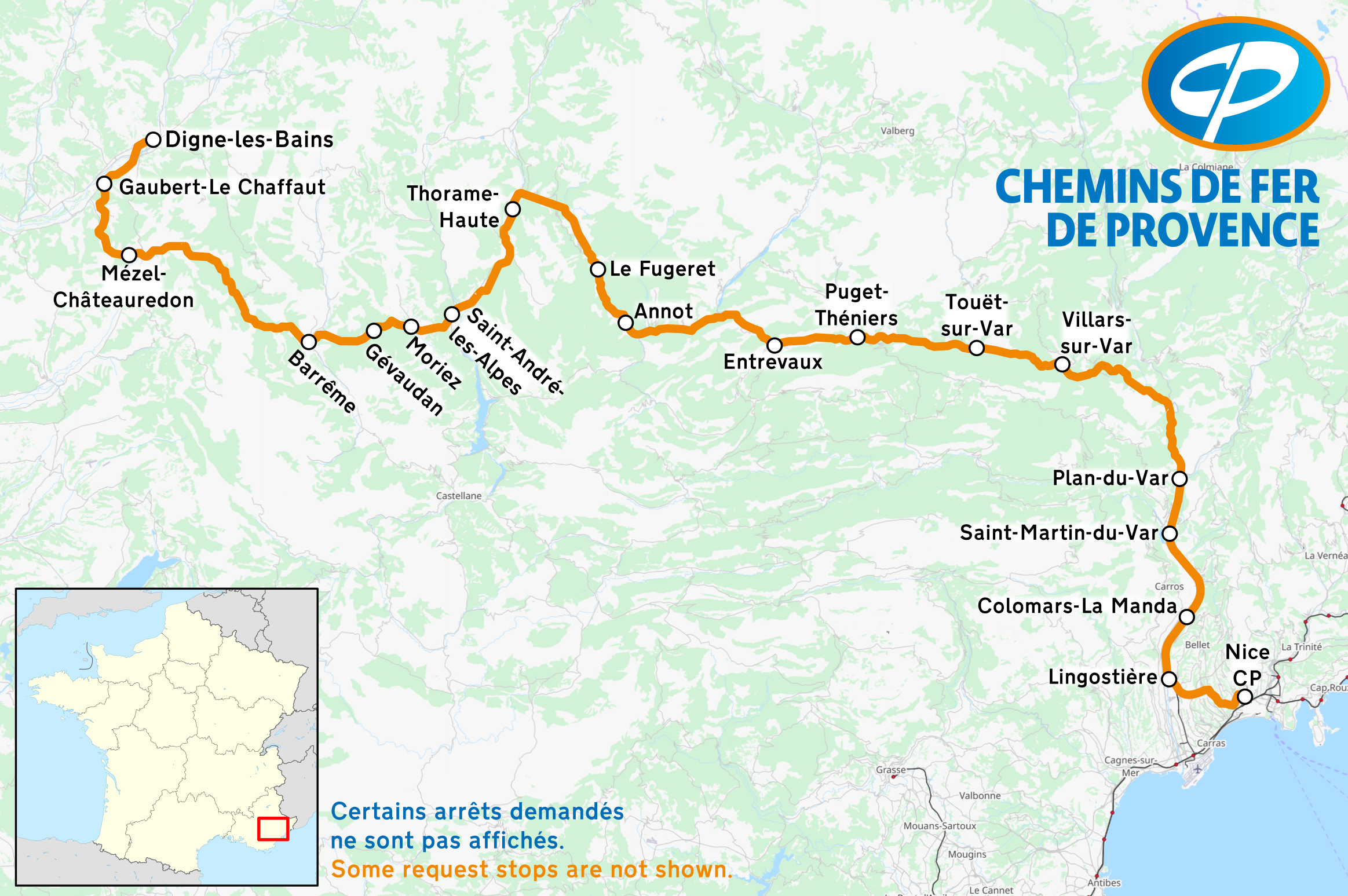

The Nice to Digne line (French: Ligne de Nice à Digne), is a French metre-gauge railway line connecting Nice to Digne-les-Bains at Digne station.

It is operated by Chemins de fer de Provence and is the only remaining Train des Pignes.
