= Train des Pignes =

Four historic metre-gauge railways in France

Coordinates: 43°43′13″N 6°59′25″E

The Train des Pignes (French pronunciation: [tʁɛ̃ de piɲ]) is a set of four metre gauge railways that once existed in the departments of Alpes-Maritimes (06), Var (83), Alpes-de-Haute-Provence (04) and Bouches-du-Rhône (13) in the Provence-Alpes-Côte-d'Azur (PACA) région in southern France:

- Nice (06) — Meyrargues (13)
- Nice (06) — Digne-les-Bains (04)
- Saint-Raphaël (83) — Toulon (83)
- Cogolin (83) — Saint-Tropez (83)

Only the one between Nice and Digne is still in operation. Therefore, today most people when they use the term, unaware of the history, refer to the Nice-Digne Line only.

Pignes is the southern French dialect word for pine cones.

The St. Raphaël - Toulon and Cogolin - St. Tropez lines were also sometimes called Le Macaron.

== History ==
The Nice to Meyrargues line was developed under the Freycinet Plan, a public works program initiated by the French Prime Minister Charles de Freycinet. The line was opened in stages between 1888 and 1892. With a length of 210 kilometres (130 mi) it was the first narrow-gauge route in France to exceed 100 kilometres (62 mi). Viaducts for the line were built to cross the rivers Siagne, Loup and Var. During the line's early years the locomotive fleet included 0-6-0 and 2-4-0 tender engines. In 1913 services ran at an average speed of 19 kilometres per hour (12 mph). The line was connected to Nice at the city's neo-classical terminus station, the Gare du Sud. Destruction of viaducts during WWII closed the section of the line between Nice and Tanneron and the rest was shut in 1950 as it was uneconomic.

Work to build these lines started in 1887 and the lines were opened in sections

- Nice — Meyrargues (210 kilometres (130 mi))
  - Draguignan - Meyrargues (22 March 1889)
  - Grasse - Draguignan (25 October 1890)
  - Colomars - Grasse (7 June 1892)
  - Nice — Colomars (2 June 1892)
- Nice — Digne (150 kilometres (93 mi))
  - Nice — Colomars (2 June 1892)
  - Colomars - Puget-Théniers (8 August 1892)
  - Puget-Théniers - St. André-les-Alpes (3 July 1911) (from 1892 to 1911 passengers were transferred by stagecoach, a trip that took 6.5 hours)
  - St.André-les-Alpes — Digne-les-Bains (15 May 1892)
- St.Raphaël — Toulon (103 kilometres (64 mi))
  - St.Raphaël — La Foux (19 September 1889)
  - La Foux - Hyères (4 August 1890)
  - Hyères — Toulon (21 August 1905)
- Cogolin — St.Tropez (9 kilometres (5.6 mi))
  - Cogolin — St.Tropez (1 July 1894)

The Nice-Digne line is today operated daily by Chemins de Fer de Provence with railcars, four trains per day.

== Rolling stock ==
=== Former rolling stock ===
Railcars by Brissonneau & Lotz and Renault were used.

=== Current rolling stock ===
The current rolling stock in use is:-

- X301 - X306 Railcars build by CFD. X301 - X304 entered into service in 1972, and X305 -X306 entered into service in 1977.
- X351 Railcar built by Soulé, with trailer XR351. Entered into service in 1984.
- XR1736 Railcar, renovated at the workshops at Lingostière in 2006.

New rolling stock is due to be introduced in 2008 which will have better facilities for disabled passengers.

=== Steam train ===
A group of voluntary rail enthusiasts in an association called Groupe d'Etude pour les Chemins de fer de Provence (GECP) operate a steam train (sometimes also called Train des Pignes) between Puget-Théniers and Annot on the Nice — Digne line every weekend from May to October, occasionally with an extended overnight trip to Digne-les-Bains.
