= Aimé Teisseire =

French military officer

- Teisseire c. 1960
- Born: Aimé Louis Albert Teisseire; 18 December 1914; Puget-Théniers, France
- Died: 28 June 2008 (aged 93) Nice, France
- Allegiance: France
- Branch: French Army
- Service years: 1934 - 1961
- Rank: Captain
- Conflicts: World War II; Indochina War
- Awards: Croix de Guerre; Ordre de la Libération; Légion d'honneur

Aimé Teisseire (18 December 1914 – 28 June 2008) was a French military officer who fought with the Free French Forces in the African campaign of World War II and later in Europe for the Liberation of France. Wounded multiple times in battle, he was awarded the Croix de Guerre and Order of Liberation. For his service in French Indochina after the war he was made a Grand Officier of the Légion d'Honneur.

== Life and career ==
The son of an employee at the Monte Carlo Casino, Teisseire was born in Puget-Théniers and studied at the Lycée Rouvière in Toulon before taking up a position at Barclays Bank in Monte Carlo. He then decided to enlist in the French army but was initially rejected on medical grounds. After spending some time in Gabon, he managed to enlist in the Senegalese Tirailleurs in 1934. He was sent to the non-commissioned officers' training school in Saint-Maixent-l'École and then assigned to the French Congo where he was promoted to sergeant in 1938. He returned to France later that year and at the outbreak of World War II was stationed at the Rochefort-sur-Mer air base. He demanded a combat job and was finally assigned to the 6th Regiment of the Colonial Infantry. He fought with them in the Battle of France and was promoted to Sergent-chef for his valor in battle near Ardennes. Wounded at Meurthe-et-Moselle in June 1940. he was taken prisoner by the Germans, and sent to the hospital at Nancy but escaped and eventually re-joined the Armée d'Armistice in Frejus.

In Frejus Teisseire attempted to convince the men to join the Free French Forces but without success. Instead, he was sent to West Africa where after many vicissitudes, he escaped from Dahomey to Lagos. Once there, a British administrator helped him to join the Free French Army in Chad. He was assigned to the 1st Company of the Regiment of Senegalese soldiers of Chad and in February 1942 was promoted to Adjutant. While training in Morocco, his regiment was evacuated to England. From there he took part in the D-Day landings and went on to fight German tank and infantry divisions in the Forêt d'Écouves. Badly wounded in a battle on the outskirts of Paris, he was discharged and sent to a hospital from which he escaped and hitch-hiked to Paris to rejoin his unit. He then fought with them in a series of battles at Andelot, Hourcourt, and Châtel-sur-Moselle. For his role in establishing the bridgehead across the Moselle, he was promoted to sub-lieutenant in September 1944. In November, he was again wounded (so seriously this time that he was given the Last Rites), but recovered and rejoined his unit to fight in the Ardennes-Alsace Campaign and eventually in Germany at Berchtesgaden.

After the war ended, Teisseire was promoted to lieutenant and assigned to French Indochina, arriving in Saigon in December 1946. He served as a company commander there, receiving three battle citations, the Ordre Royal du Cambodge, and later the Légion d'Honneur. On his return to France in 1949, he was promoted to captain. He then served as a company commander in Réunion, Madagascar, Cameroon, and finally in Algeria before retiring from the army in 1961. In 1955 he had been made an Officier of the Légion d'Honneur and was subsequently promoted to Commandeur and then Grand Officier. Teisseire's wife and daughter were present when Jacques Chirac presented him with the Grand Officier insignia on 6 October 2005.

After his retirement from the military, Teisseire worked as the chief of staff in a department store in Nice, where he lived for the rest of his life. When he died at the age of 93, he was one of the 59 surviving Compagnons de la Libération.
