= Puget-Théniers =

Commune in Provence-Alpes-Côte d'Azur, France

- Commune
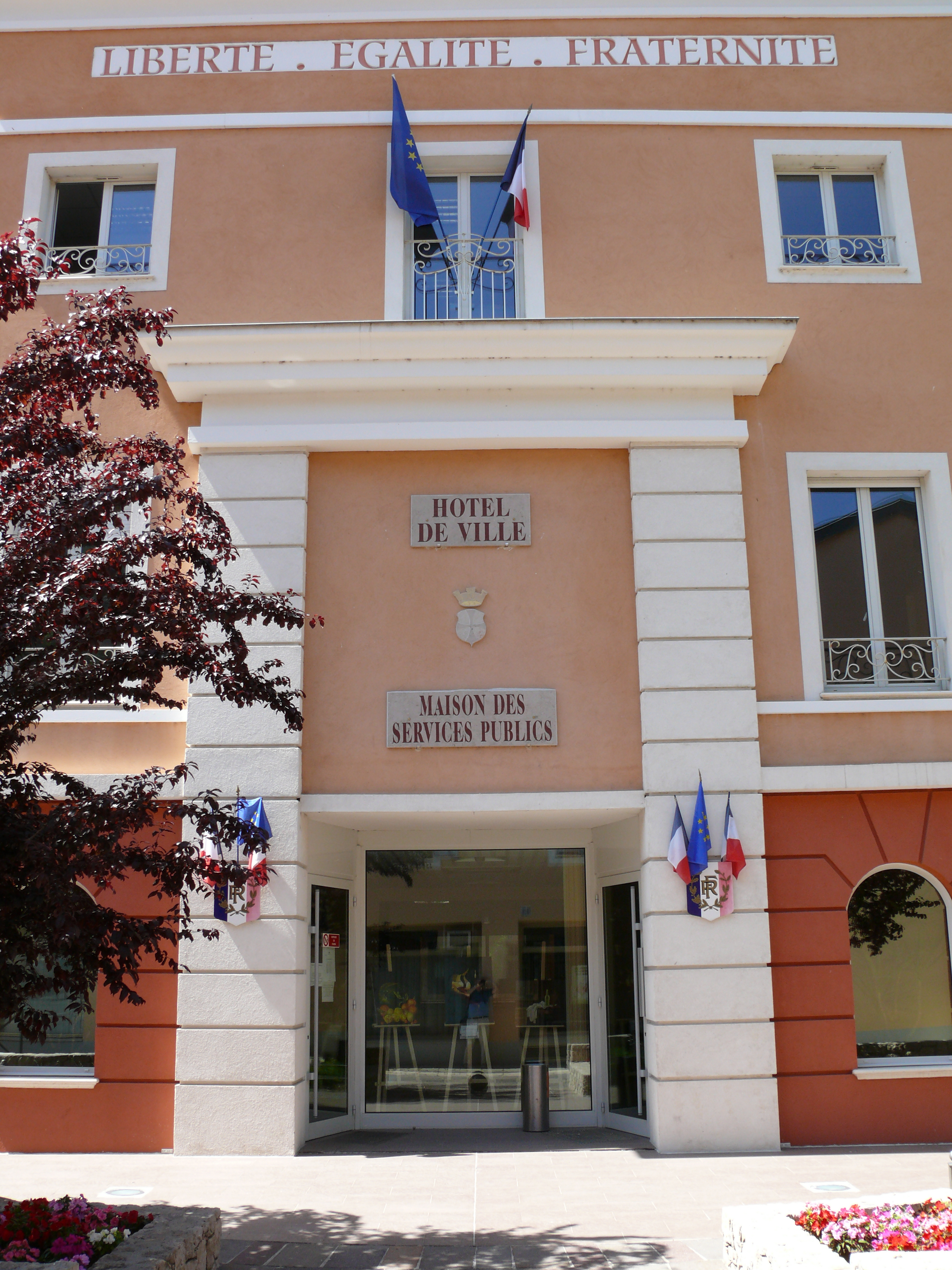
- Town hall

- Coat of arms
- Location of Puget-Théniers
- Location within France Location within Provence-Alpes-Côte d'Azur
- Coordinates: 43°57′25″N 6°53′39″E
- Country: France
- Region: Provence-Alpes-Côte d'Azur
- Department: Alpes-Maritimes
- Arrondissement: Nice
- Canton: Vence

Government
  - Mayor (2026–32): Pierre Corporandy
- Area^{1}: 21.45 km^{2} (8.28 sq mi)
- Elevation: 409 m (1,342 ft)
- Highest elevation: 1,436 m (4,711 ft)
- Lowest elevation: 353 m (1,158 ft)
- Population (2023): 1,798
  - Density: 83.82/km^{2} (217.1/sq mi)
- Time zone: UTC+01:00 (CET)
  - Summer (DST): UTC+02:00 (CEST)
- INSEE/Postal code: 06099 /06260
- ^{1} French Land Register data, which excludes lakes, ponds, glaciers > 1 km^{2} (0.386 sq mi or 247 acres) and river estuaries.

Puget-Théniers (French pronunciation: [pyʒɛ tenje]; Occitan: Lo Puget Tenier; Italian: Poggetto Tenieri) is a commune in the Alpes-Maritimes department in southeastern France.

== Geography ==
It is situated on in the valley of the Var.

== History ==
It was part of the historic County of Nice until 1860 as Poggetto Tenieri.

== Personalities ==
It is the birthplace of Auguste Blanqui, Jean-Pierre Papon and Aimé Teisseire.

== Population ==
Historical population
Year	Pop.	±% p.a.
1968	1,488	—
1975	1,438	−0.49%
1982	1,446	+0.08%
1990	1,703	+2.07%
1999	1,533	−1.16%
2007	1,822	+2.18%
2012	1,840	+0.20%
2017	1,880	+0.43%
2023	1,798	−0.74%
Source: INSEE

== See also ==
- Communes of the Alpes-Maritimes department
