= Ferdinand Bac =

German-French cartoonist, artist and writer

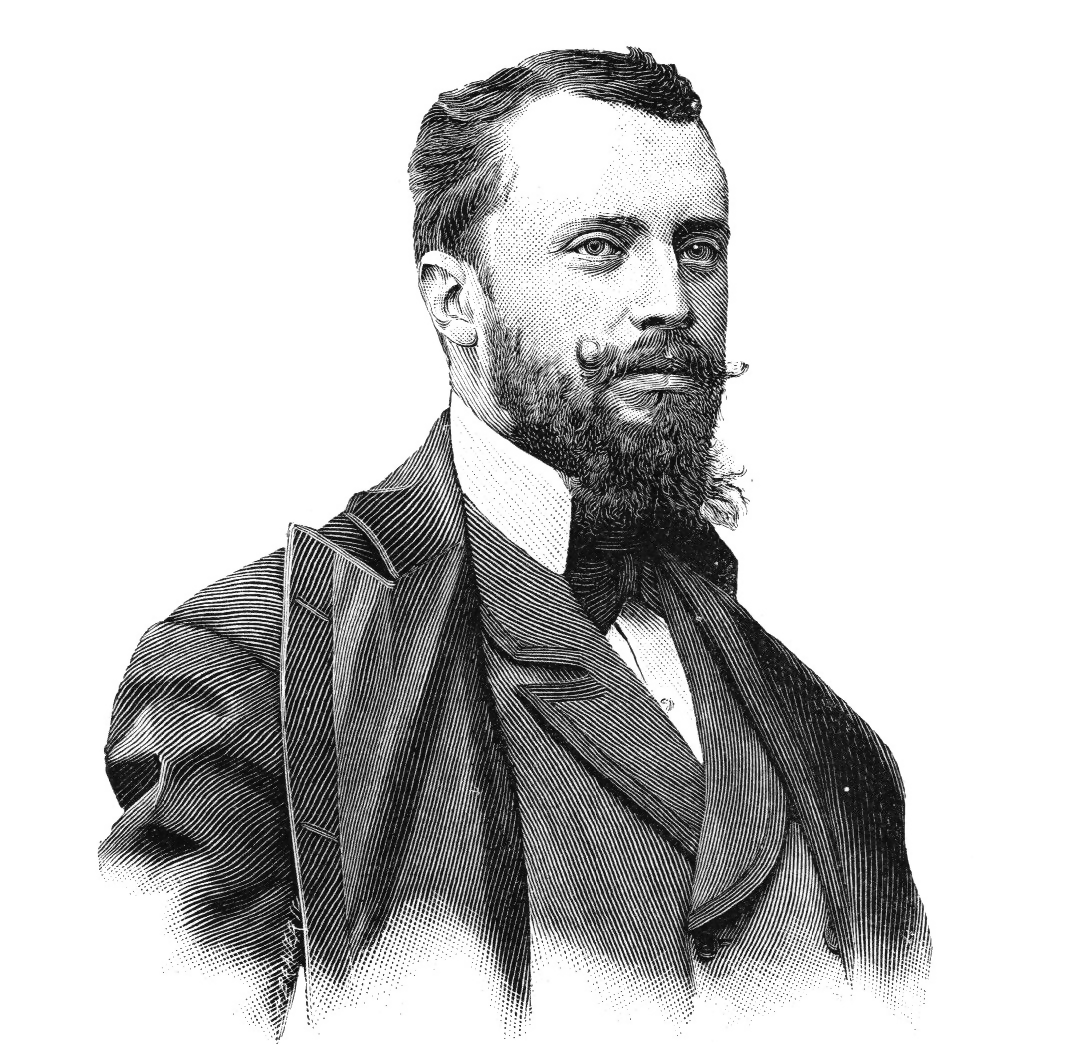
- Born: 15 August 1859; Stuttgart
- Died: 18 November 1952 (aged 93); Compiègne
- Occupations: Writer and Artist
- Known for: The gardens of Les Colombières

Ferdinand-Sigismond Bach, known as Ferdinand Bac, (15 August 1859, Stuttgart, Germany - 18 November 1952, Compiegne, France) was a German-French cartoonist, artist and writer, son of an illegitimate nephew of the Emperor Napoleon. As a young man, he mixed in the fashionable world of Paris of the Belle Époque, and was known for his caricatures, which appeared in popular journals. He also travelled widely in Europe and the Mediterranean. In his fifties, he began a career as a landscape gardener. The gardens that he created at Les Colombières in Menton on the French Riviera are now designated as a Monument Historique. He also wrote voluminously about social, historical and political subjects, but his work has been largely forgotten.

== Youth ==
Ferdinand-Sigismond Bach was born in Stuttgart on 15 August 1859. His father, Karl Philipp Heinrich Bach (1811–1870), was a geologist, cartographer and landscape architect, the illegitimate son of Jérôme Bonaparte, King of Westphalia. Ferdinand was born of a second marriage of his father with Sabina Ludovica de Stetten, daughter of Baron Sigismund-Ferdinand Stetten. The baron, born in 1772 in Bohemia, had attended the Congress of Vienna and told his memories to his grandson. Ferdinand Bac, a second cousin of Napoleon III, was raised on the margin of the court of the Second Empire.

== Early career ==
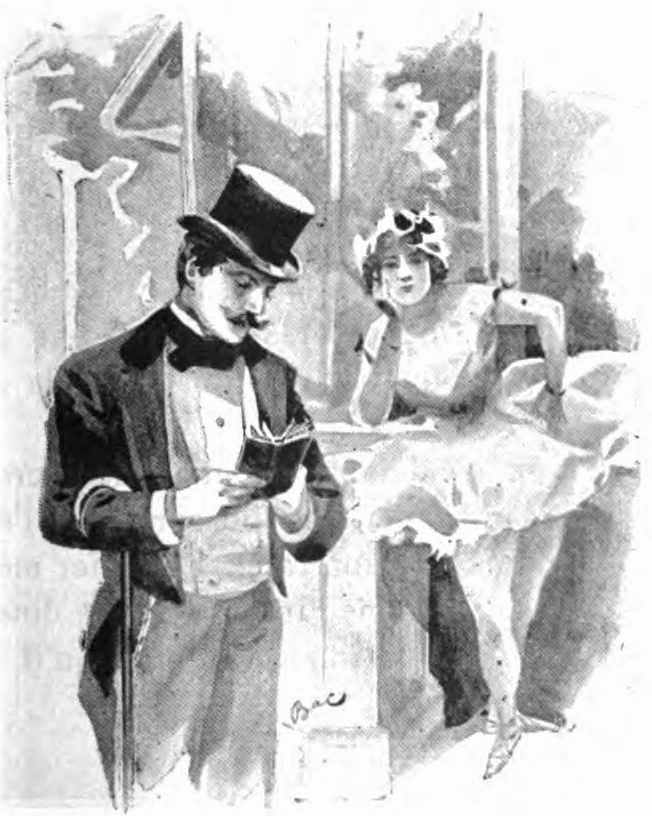
Illustration of Guy de Maupassant's Bel-Ami, 1885

A few years after the collapse of the regime, he chose to leave Germany and his mother to live a quiet but bohemian life in Paris. He was introduced to the Parisian salon society by his godfather Arsène Houssaye and Prince Napoleon, and became a fashionable artist. Ferdinand Bac's friends and acquaintances included Adolphe Thiers, Léon Gambetta, Richard Wagner, Victor Hugo, Hippolyte Taine, Auguste de Villiers de L'Isle-Adam, Paul Verlaine, Maurice Barrès, Jules Barbey d'Aurevilly, Alphonse Daudet, Guy de Maupassant, Giuseppe Verdi, Charles Gounod and Pierre de Nolhac.

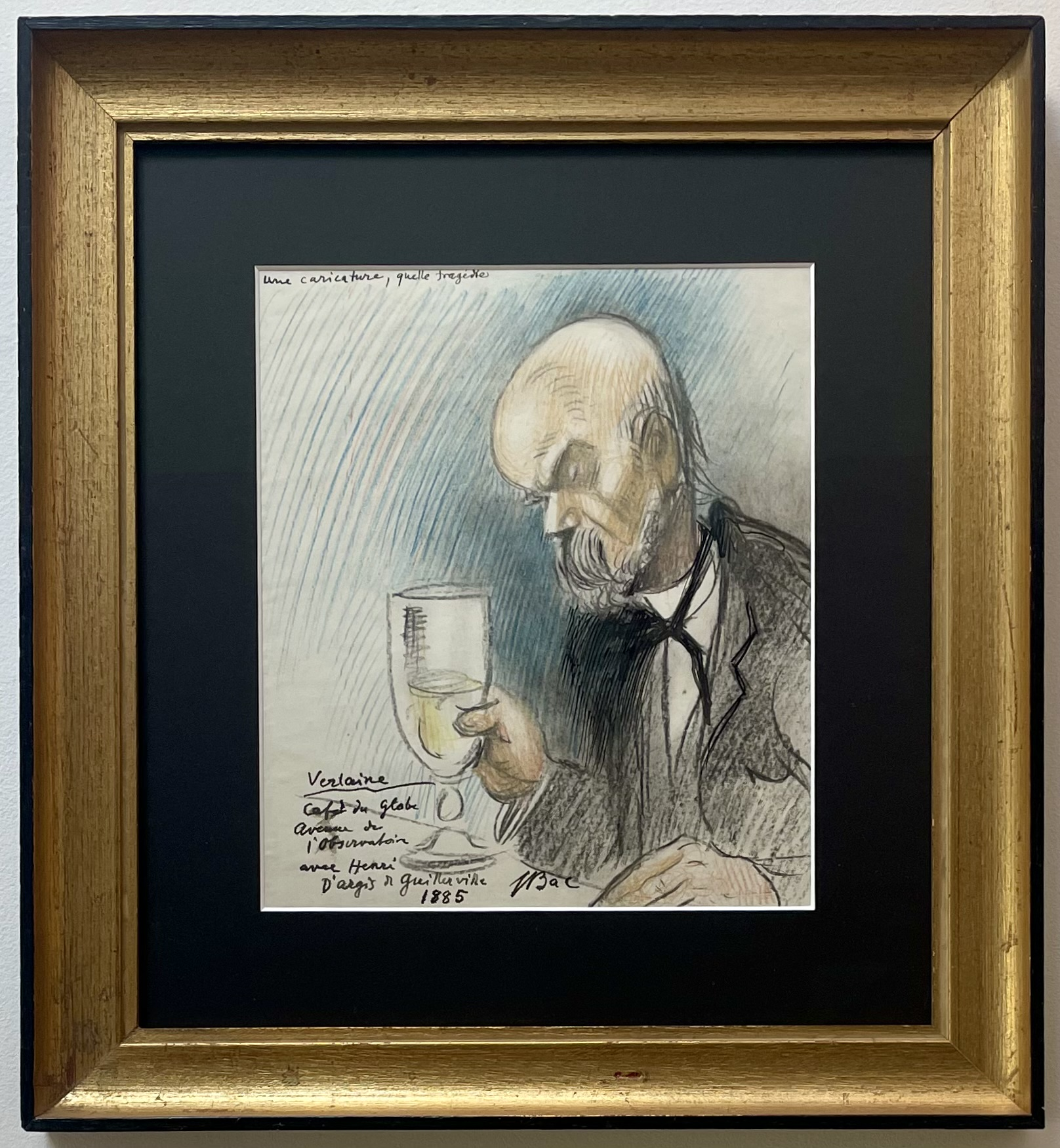
Paul Verlaine par Ferdinand Bac, Paris 1885

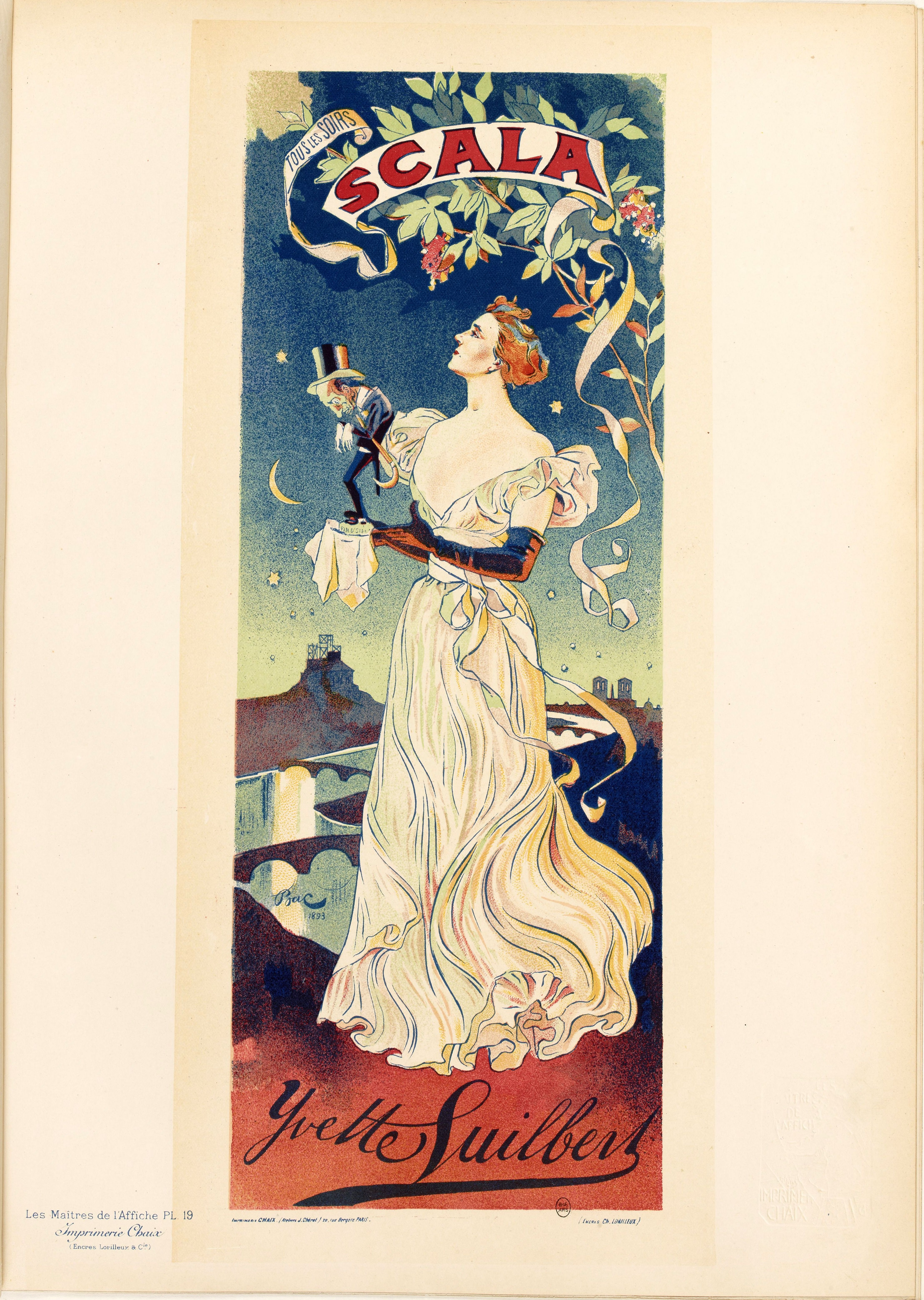
Poster from Les Maîtres de l'Affiche

Ferdinand Bac's early drawings were published in the satirical weekly La Caricature, edited between 1880 and 1890 by Albert Robida, himself a cartoonist. Robida acted more as a friend than as a boss to Bac and other cartoonists working for the journal. Bac became one of the leading designers and cartoonists of his time, with a reputation equal to contemporaries such as Robida, Job, Sem, Jean-Louis Forain and Caran d'Ache.

Bac's cartoons were often risqué and reflected contemporary Parisian attitudes towards sex. His 1892 drawing Femmes Automatiques for La Vie Parisienne depicted a collection of women in different roles who could be animated by inserting a coin. It implies that in addition to their legitimate roles as dancer, chambermaid, actress and so on, the women would provide sexual services at varying prices. An erotic illustration for the same journal in 1899 showed a woman wrapped in snakes. Bac often drew pictures of models posing for artists that suggested an intimate relationship.

Bac was a romantic, inspired by Watteau and Fragonard. He travelled widely through Europe, visiting Turkey, Sicily, Spain and Norway. In 1880 he was in Morocco with the artists John Singer Sargent and Charles Daux, where the three men rented a small house in Tangier. He had a particular love for Germany, Austria and Italy. He was awarded the Legion of Honor in 1913, and recognized by the Académie française.

== Garden design ==
Ferdinand Bac was over 50 when he discovered his vocation as a garden designer. In 1912, while dining with Marie-Thérèse de Croisset at her home in the French Riviera, he offered to transform the house and garden. The Villa Croisset was characterless but had a magnificent view of the country around Grasse. Bac started sketching plans of arches, courtyards and gardens, and began work the next day. The outbreak of World War I delayed the project, but it was completed by 1918. Bac aimed for a modern Mediterranean style. The structures had simple forms and were made of common local materials. The design united the house, garden and landscape with views framed by plants and structures. Colours were warm, including ochres, pinks and saffrons, offset by dark greens and Venetian red. A simple chapel dedicated to Saint Francis stood at the top of the garden.

After this project, Ferdinand Bac transformed the Fiorentina villa in Cap Ferrat for the Countess of Beaumont. Bac's friend, Émile Ladan-Bockairy, and his wife, Caroline, bought the Les Colombières estate above Menton in 1918, it was formerly the property of the philosopher Alfred Jules Émile Fouillée. They invited Bac to come to live with them, and to rebuild and enlarge the building. His design for the house drew on his memories from visits to different Mediterranean countries. Bac painted the frescoes in the house and designed the Modernist furniture. He planned a garden around the house with pavilions, colonnades, bridges and secret gardens. There were quiet, enclosed spaces and open areas of wild plants with broad vistas. The garden, above the town of Menton, is said to have the oldest carob tree in France.

Ferdinand Bac wrote that "the soul of gardens shelters the greatest sum of serenity at man's disposal." The young Mexican architect Luis Barragán came across two books, Les Colombières and Jardins enchantés, that Bac had written about his eclectic Mediterranean gardens, and heard him talking about garden design at the 1925 Exposition of Decorative Arts in Paris, which inspired him in his own work. Barragán visited France again in 1931–32, and managed to visit Bac's gardens several times.

== Later years ==
From 1918 onward, when he was aged 60, Ferdinand alternated between Colombières and a beautiful mansion in Compiègne that also belonged to the Ladan-Bockairys. There he met Marcel Proust, Jean Cocteau, Gabriele D'Annunzio and Anna de Noailles. Until the end of his life, Ferdinand Bac continued to travel, write and draw, reflecting on the political and historical development of the world. For nearly 80 years, he was still spending three hours a day on correspondence. In his later years he would know popes, kings, presidents and all the elite.

He was forced into exile in 1940 and saw some of his work go up in smoke in 1944. His spirit was always alive, allowing him to draw and comment on the books that were sent to him. Still worried by the idea of dying too young, he strove to leave some of his work in numerous museums and libraries, including the Bibliothèque de l'Arsenal in Paris, Municipal Library in Menton and Bibliothèque Cessole in Nice. Each paper is annotated with his hand.

Ferdinand Bac died in Compiègne on 18 November 1952, aged 93, surviving his friend Émile Ladan-Bockairy by three days. Ladan-Bockairy's wife lived on for several years. The tombs of the three friends are contained in a mausoleum in the garden at Les Colombières. The house and garden were classified as historic monuments on 3 October 1991. As of 2013, they were privately owned. The Villa Croisset and its gardens were largely destroyed by 1975. Some traces of the upper, north-east portion of the garden remain, including an arch and the chapel. A school in Compiègne bears Bac's name.

== Works ==
- Mistresses, comprising 100 colour drawings (1897)
- The Female Comedy, containing 100 unpublished drawings (1899)
- Lovers, containing 100 colour drawings (1900)
- Images, containing 100 drawings (1901)
- Petites Folies, containing 100 drawings (1903)
- Old Germany. Nuremberg, Louisbourg Castle (1906)
- Old Germany. The Landscapes of Goethe: Frankfurt, Wetzlar, Weimar, Jena (1907)
- Master Comedians (1908)
- The Phantom of Paris (1908)
- The Venetian Mystery: Verona, Padua, Venice (1909)
- Romantic Journey (2 volumes, 1910–1912)
- The Italian Adventure (1912)
- Old France (1913)
- Memories of exile, the end of the old Germany, 1812-1871 (1919)
- Roman Delight, adorned with 100 colour illustrations by the author (1922)
- The singular adventure of Odysseus in forty one frescoes (1923)
- Odysseus. A singular adventure. With 65 full-page colour illustrations (1923)
- Les Colombières. Gardens and scenery described by the author with 60 colour plates (1925)
- Enchanted gardens. A Ballad. With 36 gardens in colour by the author (1925)
- The Pilgrim lovers. Confessions of a libertine (1926)
- The Extra-planetary. Impressions of the Terrestrials (1926)
- Jean Paul or universal love. Romantic Germany. 1763-1825 (1927)
- Schubert or the wind harp, 1797-1828 (1928)
- The Marriage of Empress Eugénie (1928)
- Louis I of Bavaria and Lola Montès (1928)
- The Praise of Folly. 10 original lithographs (1929)
- Trip to Berlin. The End of the Romantic Germany (1929)
- The Favori of Cardinal Albani (Jean-Joachim Winckelmann), the father of archeology, 1717-1768 (1929)
- Princess Mathilde. Her life and her friends (1929)
- L'Ancienne France. The Court of the Tuileries under the Second Empire (1930)
- The Anti-Latin. The German Reformation. 1517-1546 (1930)
- Intimacies of the Second Empire. The Court and the City, according to contemporary documents (1931)
- Intimacies of the Second Empire. Women in Comedy. According to contemporary documents (1931)
- Intimacies of the Second Empire. Poets and artists, from contemporary records (1932)
- Prince Napoleon (1932)
- The Unknown Napoleon III (1933)
- Vienna at the time of Napoleon, according to contemporary accounts (1933)
- The Secret of Talleyrand: according to contemporary accounts (1933)
- Walks in the new Italy (3 volumes, 1933–1935)
- Walks in old Europe. The City of Porcelain. Dresden at the time of the kings of Poland and Napoleon (1934)
- Walks in old Europe. Munich. Things seen from Louis II to Hitler (1934)
- Intimacies of the 3rd Republic. From Thiers to President Carnot. Childhood memories (1935)
- Intimacies of the 3rd Republic. End of the delicious time. Paris Memories (1935)
- Intimacies of the 3rd Republic. The Ballets Russes to the Peace of Versailles. Memories of a witness (1936)
- The flute and drum. Thoughts of a witness of the century (1937)
- The Return of the Grand Army, in 1812, according to survivors. With 90 compositions with the author (1939)
- Unknown Merimee (1939)
- Quotes from Montesquieu, 4 colour drawings (1943)
- Memories of Compiègne, Second Empire (1946)
