= Alfred Jules Émile Fouillée =

French philosopher (1838–1912)

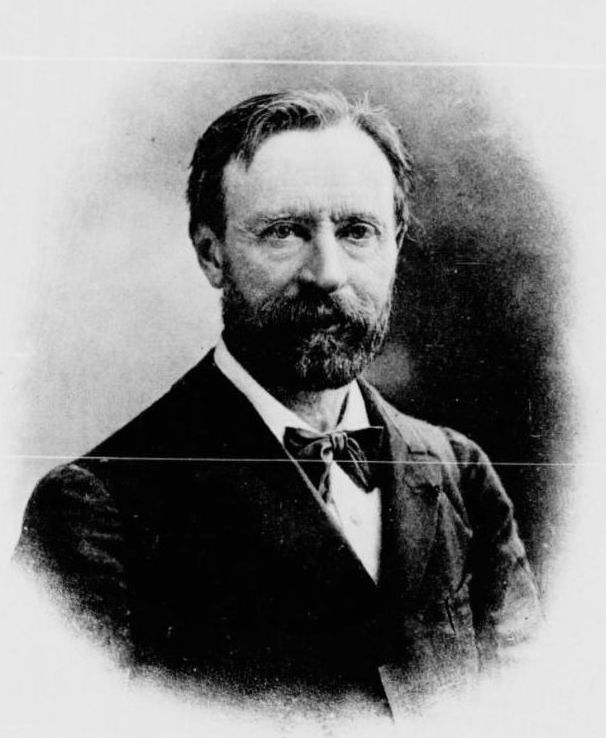
Alfred Fouillée by Nadar

Alfred Jules Émile Fouillée (French: [alfʁɛd fuje]; 18 October 1838 – 16 January 1912) was a French philosopher of the spiritualist school.

== Life ==
Fouillée was born at La Pouëze, Maine-et-Loire. He held several minor philosophical lectureships, and from 1864 was professor of philosophy at the lycées of Douai, Montpellier and Bordeaux successively. In 1867 and 1868 he was crowned by the Academy of Moral Science for his work on Plato and Socrates. In 1872 he was elected master of conferences at the Ecole Normale, and was made doctor of philosophy in recognition of his two treatises, Platonis Hippias Minor sine Socratica contra liberum arbitrium argumenta and La Liberté et le déterminisme.

The strain of the next three years' continuous work undermined his health and his eyesight, and he was compelled to retire from his professorship. During these years he had published works on Plato and Socrates and a history of philosophy (1875); but after his retirement he further developed his philosophical position, a speculative eclecticism through which he endeavoured to reconcile metaphysical idealism with the naturalistic and mechanical standpoint of science.

In L'Évolutionnisme des idées-forces (1890), La Psychologie des idées-forces (1893), and La Morale des idées-forces (1907), is elaborated his doctrine of idées-forces, or of mind as efficient cause through the tendency of ideas to realize themselves in appropriate movement. Ethical and sociological developments of this theory succeed its physical and psychological treatment, the consideration of the antinomy of freedom being especially important.

Fouillée's wife, Augustine Fouillée, who by a previous marriage was the mother of the poet and philosopher Jean-Marie Guyau, is better known, under the pseudonym of "G. Bruno", as the author of the books for children, including educational novel and school book Le Tour de la France par deux enfants (1877).

Fouillée occupied the Les Colombières estate in Menton, which was later remodelled by Ferdinand Bac. He died on 16 January 1912 in Lyon.

== Works ==
His other chief works are:

- L'Idée moderne du droit en Allemagne, en Angleterre et en France (Paris, 1878)
- La Science sociale contemporaine (1880)
- La Propriété sociale et la démocratie (1884)
- Critique des systèmes de morale contemporains (1883)
- La Morale, l'art et la religion d'après Guyau (1889)
- L'Avenir de la métaphysique fondée sur l'expérience (1889)
- L'Enseignement au point de vue national (1891)
- Descartes (1893)
- Tempérament et caractère (2nd ed., 1895)
- Le Mouvement positiviste et la conception sociologique du monde (1896)
- Le Mouvement idéaliste et la réaction contre la science positive (1896)
- La Psychologie du peuple français (2nd ed., 1898)
- La France au point de vue moral (1900)
- L'Esquisse psychologique des peuples européens (1903)
- Nietzsche et "l'immoralisme" (1903)
- Le Moralisme de Kant, et l'immoralisme contemporain (1905)

== See also ==
- Stefan Pawlicki
