= Les Colombières =

Villa in Menton, Alpes-Maritimes, France

Coordinates: 43°47′14.59″N 7°30′59.83″E

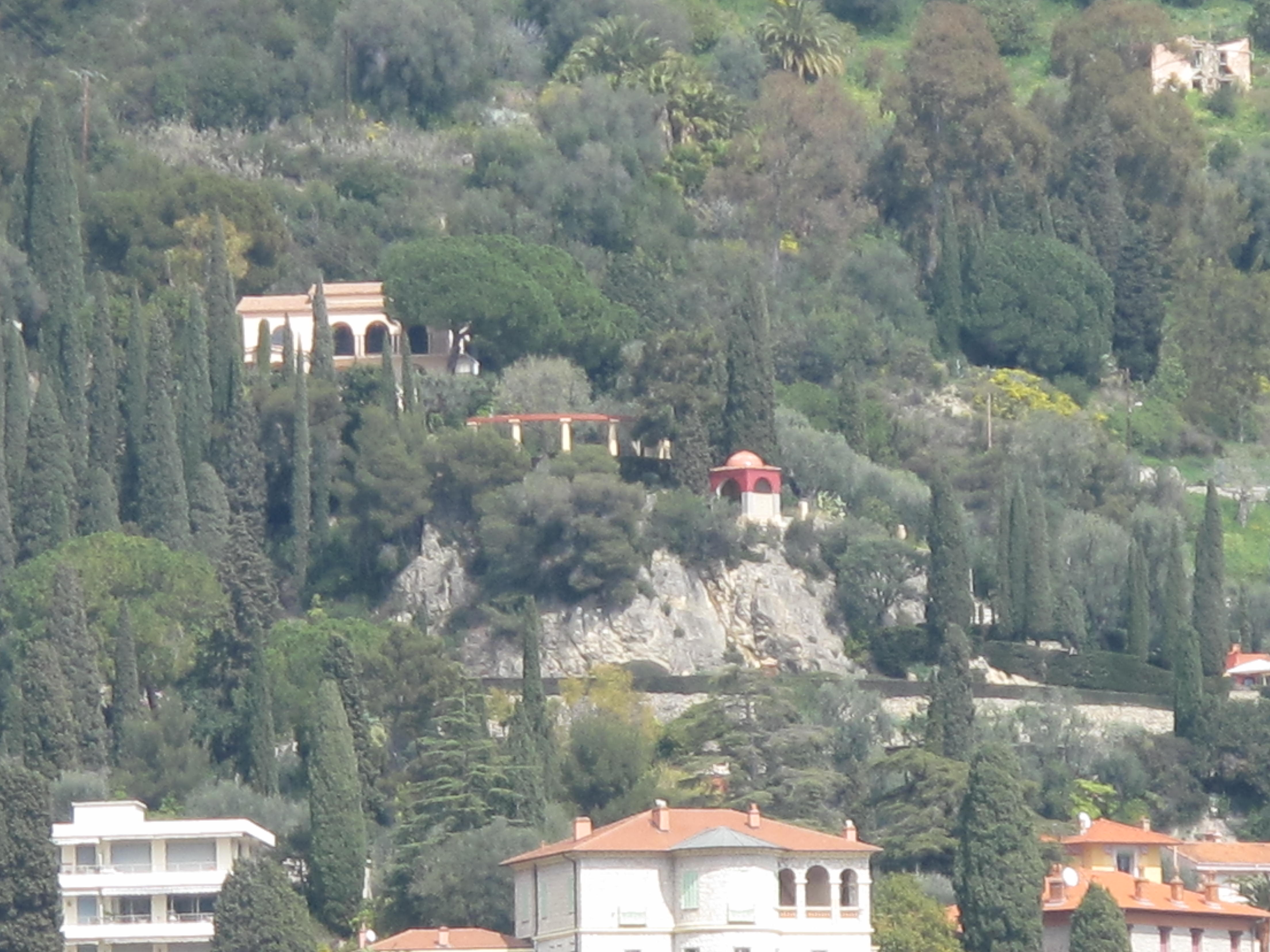
A distant view of the Les Colombières estate from Menton.

Les Colombières (The Dovecote) is a villa in Menton, in the Alpes-Maritimes department on the French Riviera. The gardens of the villa were designed by Ferdinand Bac between 1918 and 1927. Bac also designed modernist furniture for the house and personally painted all the villa's frescos and paintings. The gardens are 7.4 acres (3.0 ha) in size, and have been described as full of "wit, brilliance and imagination" that "inspire both the intellect and the imagination".

Bac's friends Émile and Caroline Ladan-Bockairy bought the Domaine des Colombières in 1918; before this, it was the property of the philosopher Alfred Jules Émile Fouillée. The Ladan-Bockairys invited Bac to come to live with them and to rebuild and enlarge the building. His design for the house drew on his memories from visits to different Mediterranean countries. Bac painted the frescoes in the house and designed the Modernist furniture.

The villa, built in 1790, is set over three storeys, and is 800 square metres (8,600 sq ft) in size. It has 14 bedrooms and 13 bathrooms, with an exterior painted red and yellow. The interior of the house is adorned with frescos painted by Bac, featuring idealised landscapes from Mediterranean countries including Greece, Turkey, Italy, and Morocco. Some of the rooms are themed; a carnival scene is depicted in the Venetian Room, a room also decorated with a Murano glass chandelier and gondola lights. Wooden cabinets painted with birds line the Parrot Room.

During the Second World War, the villa was used in the rehabilitation of Italian soldiers and, subsequently, as a bed-and-breakfast. Prominent visitors to Les Colombières included the artist Jean Cocteau and the French war hero Marshal Joseph Joffre.

Bac died in Compiègne in November 1952, aged 93; he survived Émile Ladan-Bockairy by three days. Caroline Ladan-Bockairy lived for several years afterward, and the three of them are buried in a mausoleum on a rock overlooking the garden at Les Colombières.

== Garden ==
Bac planned a garden around the house with pavilions, colonnades, bridges, and secret gardens. There were quiet, enclosed spaces and open areas of wild plants with broad vistas. Bac wrote that "the soul of gardens shelters the greatest sum of serenity at man's disposal." Bac wrote two books about his Mediterranean gardens, Les Colombières and Jardins enchantés. Created on the site of an olive grove, the gardens are set over several levels, studded with Mediterranean cypresses. The gardens reference classical literature such as Homer's Odyssey, including Nausicaa's fountain, a garden named for Ulysses, and a head of Medusa. At the centre of an avenue of large olive jars is a 600-year carob tree, said to be the oldest carob tree in France. Twelve small buildings guide visitors through the garden. The site is located on a hillside above Menton's harbour. and noted for its fine views of the Bay of Menton and Menton's old city.

== Recent history ==
Les Colombières was classified as a French Monuments Historique in October 1991.

The estate has been owned by a British couple, Michael and Margaret Likierman, since 1995. Michael Likierman was the founding CEO of the French arm of Habitat furniture stores. Margaret Likierman had first visited the house on a guided tour of its garden three years earlier, as a participant of a colloquium on the future of historic private gardens. Half of the estate had been sold by Caroline's Ladan-Bockairy's descendants, and the Ladan-Bockairy's last child died in 1991. In their purchase of the estate the Likiermans had to negotiate with the grandchildren of the Ladan-Bockairys, and restore the house with sensitivity, in order to comply with their acquisition of a "Monuments Historiques". The restoration of Les Colombières was enabled by the assistance of Jean-Yvan Yarmola, the chief architect of France's "Monuments Historiques", the Czech contemporary sculptor Ivan Theimer, architect Bernard Camous, and landscape designer Arnaud Maurières. The Likiermans spent five years restoring the house at a cost of €4 million, and moved into Les Colombières in 2000. Their restoration was designed with a potential future purchaser in mind, as a swimming pool and air conditioning were added to the house, and "the right number of bedrooms and bathrooms."

== Sources ==
- Álvarez Álvarez, Darío (2007). El jardín en la arquitectura del siglo XX: Naturaleza artificial en la cultura moderna. Reverte. p. 304. ISBN 978-84-291-2114-8.
- Barragan, Rodolfo (2008). An Architectural Score: Recording and Orchestrating an Architectural Experience. ISBN 978-0-549-92900-0.
- Evans, Adele; Williams, Roger (19 January 2012). DK Eyewitness Travel Guide: Provence and Cote D'Azur. DK Publishing. ISBN 978-0-7566-9106-6.
- Facaros, Dana; Pauls, Michael (2007). South of France. New Holland Publishers. p. 110. ISBN 978-1-86011-358-1.
- Robida, Albert; Willems, Philippe; Evans, Arthur B. (17 March 2004). The Twentieth Century. Wesleyan University Press. ISBN 978-0-8195-6680-5.
- Roucaute, Gérard; Heller, Marc (2013). "Domaine des Colombières". Ministry of Culture.
- Spencer-Jones, Rae (2012). 1001 Gardens You Must See Before You Die. London: Cassell Illustrated. ISBN 978-1-84403-737-7.
- Walker, Peter (1996). Invisible Gardens: The Search for Modernism in the American Landscape. MIT Press. ISBN 978-0-262-73116-4.
