= Augustine Tuillerie =

French writer

- Born: 31 July 1833; Laval, France
- Died: 8 July 1923 (aged 89); Menton, France
- Writing career
- Pen name: G. Bruno, Augustine Thuillerie, Augustine Guyau, Augustine Fouillée

Augustine Tuillerie (31 July 1833 – 8 July 1923) was a French writer best known under the pseudonym G. Bruno. She wrote instructional books and educational books aimed at the children of the Third Republic.

== Personal life ==
Augustine Tuillerie was born in Laval, Mayenne born on 31 July 1833. Her surname is spelt Thuillerie. Her father was a manufacturer from Saint-Vénérand. She married Jean Guyau in 1853 and they had a son, the philosopher Jean-Marie Guyau. Her husband was abusive and she left him. Tuillerie then lived with the philosopher Alfred Fouillée. Once she was able to divorce her first husband after 1884, she married him. She and her husband were considered the intellectuals of the Third Republic, from the west of France. Tuillerie died in Menton on 8 July 1923.

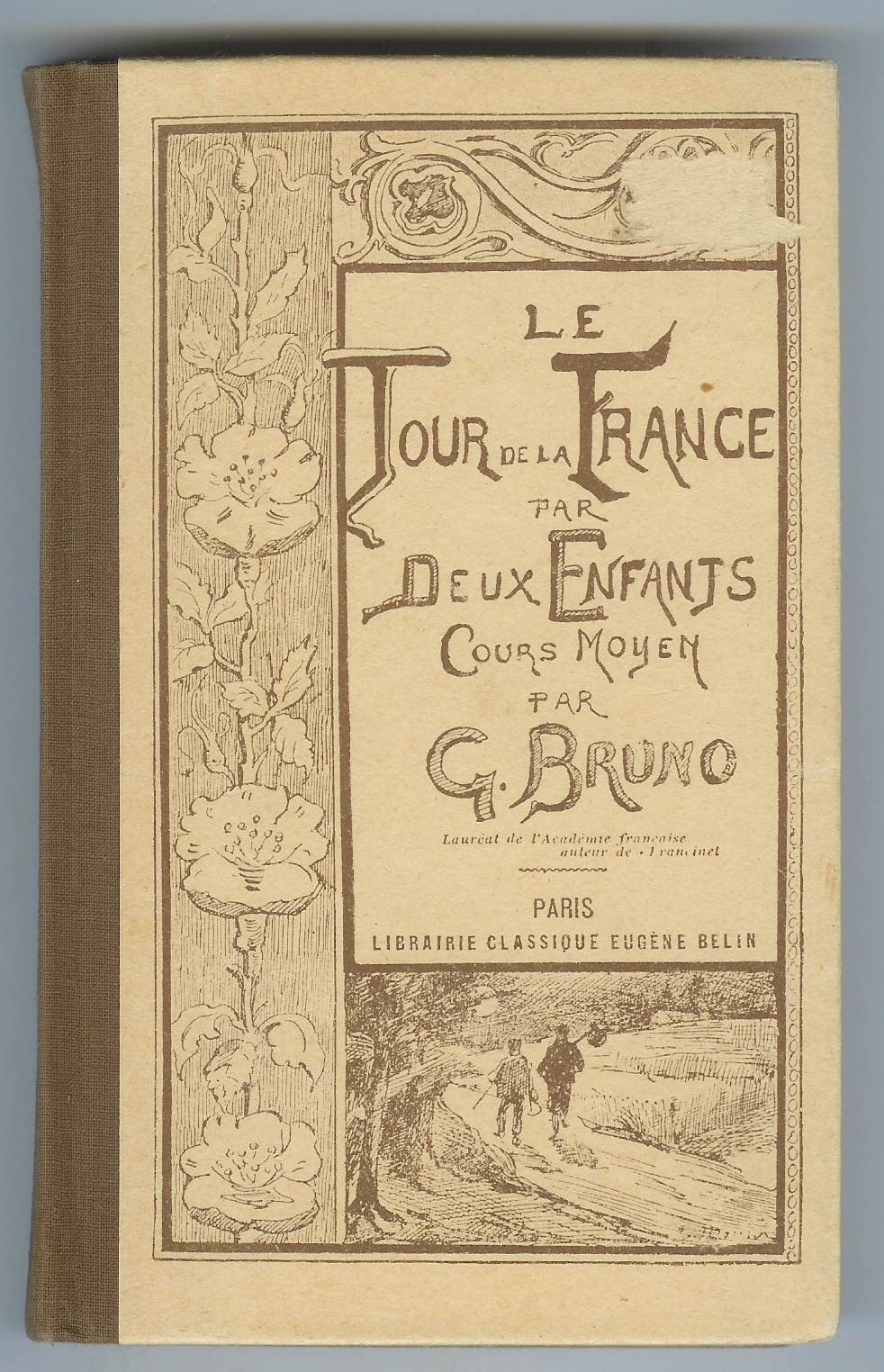
Tour de France par deux enfants

== Writing life ==
In 1869 she wrote a manual in the form of a coming of age story, Francine about a teenage boy entering working life. While a book on civic instruction and ethics it also discusses ideas around law, economics and science. She went on to write The Tour of France by two children in 1877. This book uses geography, history, and scientific knowledge in the telling of the story and became a standard book in schools. It is credited with being part of the unification of France through an idea of unity in diversity, bringing the various regional aspects of France under one national identify. She continued with these ideas in Les Enfants de Marcel, which she published in 1887.

During the First World War, Tuillerie published the Tour of Europe which was a sequel to the Tour of France and included the same characters, André and Julien Volden with their children.

Her pen name was inspired by the name of the Italian philosopher and writer Giordano Bruno. She is remembered in her home town of Laval where a square is named after her as is a school.

== Bibliography ==
- Francine, 1869
- The Tour of France by two children, 1877
- The Children of Marcel, 1887
- The Tour of Europe during the war, 1916
