= Stefan Pawlicki =

Polish Catholic priest and historian (1839–1916)

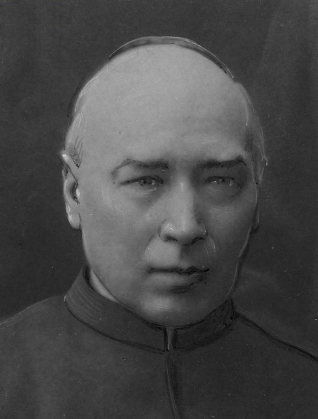
Portrait of Pawlicki, c. 1888–1893

Stefan Zachariasz Pawlicki (2 September 1839, Danzig (Gdańsk) – 28 April 1916, Kraków) was a Polish Catholic priest, philosopher, historian of philosophy, professor and rector of Kraków's Jagiellonian University.

== Life ==
Stefan Pawlicki came from a merchant family. He began his education in Danzig (Gdańsk); after his family moved to Greater Poland, he continued it in Pleschen (Pleszew). At age thirteen, he lost his parents during an epidemic. He completed progimnazjum thanks to help from a local parish priest, Father Basiński. He continued his education in 1853–58 at a liceum in Ostrów Wielkopolski, where he was one of the best pupils, thanks to a scholarship from Jan Kanty Działyński of Kórnik.

In 1858–62 he studied classical philology at Breslau University. At Breslau (Wrocław) he was secretary and president of the Slavic-Literary Society. In 1862 he left Breslau without taking a degree. In 1862–64 he was tutor, at Rogalin, to Edward Aleksander Raczyński. From 1864 he studied in the Philosophy Department at Wrocław University. At the same time, he attended lectures in psychology and logic. In 1865 he defended a doctoral thesis, De Schopenhaueri doctrina et philosophandi ratione—a then pioneering study of the thought of Arthur Schopenhauer.

In 1866 his study of The Eleatic School (Szkoła Eleatów) won him an assistant professorship (docentura) at Warsaw's Main School. He lectured there until 1868, in the Philological-Historical Department, on the history of philosophy. He also conducted open lectures in Warsaw for the intelligentsia. In 1868 he became an editor of Biblioteka Warszawska, in which he published theatrical and literary reviews.

In Warsaw, influenced by the founder and superior general of the Congregation of the Resurrection of Our Lord Jesus Christ, Father Piotr Semenenko, he underwent a spiritual transformation. In 1868 he went to Rome and entered upon a Resurrectionist novitiate. In 1872, in the Basilica of St. John Lateran, he took holy orders.

In 1869 Pawlicki began studying Christian philosophy and theology at the Jesuit Collegium Romanum. In 1873 he defended a doctorate in theology on The Secret of the Holy Trinity. That same year, he became Vice Rector of the Polish College in Rome. In 1887 he sought a chair in philosophy at Kraków's Jagiellonian University, without success. He remained in Rome and was called by Pope Pius IX to lecture at the Accademia di Religione Cattolica.

In 1882 Pawlicki obtained a professorship in Kraków University's Theology Department. Pope Leo XIII heralded his arrival with the Latin words: "Magnum lumen vobis mitto" ("I send you a great light").

At a consistory of 10 November 1884, the Pope desired to elevate Father Pawlicki to Cardinal, but Pawlicki declined the honor. In 1884 he was elected a correspondent of the Historical-Philosophical Department of the Academy of Learning, and in 1891 its active member. In 1894 he received a second chair, in the Jagiellonian University's Philosophical Department. In 1888–89 and 1892–93 he was dean of the University's Theology Department. In academic year 1905–06 he was the University's rector. In 1910 he retired, later lecturing at the University without pay.

From 1911 Pawlicki headed a Commission on the History of Polish Philosophy. He was a member of the Philosophical Society in Kraków and the Polish Philosophical Society in Lwów. Additionally, he belonged to a number of Italian and German scholarly societies.

Pawlicki was laid to rest at Kraków's Rakowicki Cemetery.

== Legacy ==
Pawlicki left his rich book collection to the Jagiellonian University Library. He was honored in Kraków with a street named for him.

Historian of philosophy Władysław Tatarkiewicz writes that Pawlicki was a man of broad culture and philosophical bent, but lacking in real talent for writing or teaching. Under his thirty-plus-year tenure, Kraków philosophy became mainly a historical discipline, out of touch with what was happening in the West or even in Warsaw.

== Works ==
- Historia filozofii greckiej od Talesa do śmierci Arystotelesa (A History of Greek Philosophy from Thales to the Death of Aristotle), vol. I, 1890; vol. II, 1903, incomplete
- Wiktor Cousin (Victor Cousin), 1867
- O początkach chrześcijaństwa (On the Origins of Christianity), 1884
- Pozytywizm (Studia nad pozytywizmem) [Positivism (Studies of Positivism)], 1886
- Renan, 1896
- Filozofia Fouillé'go (The Philosophy of Fouillée), 1899
- Materializm (Materializm wobec nauki) [Materialism (Materialism and Science)], 1870
- Darwinizm (Darwinism), 1876
- Mózg i dusza (Brain and Soul), 1874
- Kilka uwag o podstawach i granicach filozofii (Some Remarks on the Foundations and Limits of Philosophy), 1878
- Lassalle i przyszłość socjalizmu (Lassalle and the Future of Socialism)
- Żywot i dzieła Ernesta Renana (The Life and Works of Ernest Renan)

== See also ==
- History of philosophy in Poland
- List of Poles
