= Le Tour de la France par deux enfants =

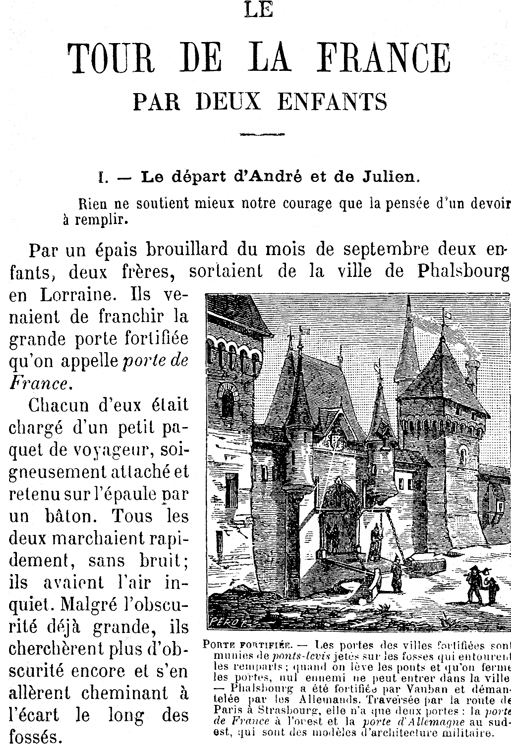
The book is well illustrated with pen and ink drawings (1930 edition)

Le Tour de la France par deux enfants (1877) is a French novel/geography/travel/school book. It was written by Augustine Fouillée (née Tuillerie) who used the pseudonym of G. Bruno. She was the wife of Alfred Jules Émile Fouillée. The book was widely used in the schools of the Third Republic, where it was influential for generations of children in creating a sense of a unified nation of France. Its success was such that it reached a circulation of 6 million copies in 1900, and by 1914 it had sold 7 million copies. It was still used in schools until the 1950s and is in print to this day. It is sometimes known as "the little red book of the Republic".

The story recounts the journey of two young brothers from Phalsbourg in Lorraine, Andrew and Julian Volden, who, following the annexation of the Alsace–Lorraine by the Prussians in the 1870–71 Franco-Prussian War, and the death of their father, go in search of family members through the French provinces. There are passages on the taste of local foods, the strange patois, mitigated by methodical learning. It is very patriotic and emphasizes civic and moral education, as well as geography, science, history. The story teaches about monuments and symbols, exemplary lives of inventors, soldiers and patriot benefactors. The accumulated wealth of knowledge—agriculture, home economics, hygiene—leads them to establish a perfect farm called "La Grand'Lande", symbolic of the nation of France.

The book was reissued in 2000 by Belin, and in 2006 by France Loisirs.

== Adaptations ==
- A silent film version was released in 1923 by Louis de Carbonnat for Pathé.
- A television series began in 1957 for the RTF (French Radio and Television).
- Jean-Luc Godard made in 1977, for French television (Antenna 2), a series on the occasion of the centenary of the book and is titled France/tour/détour/deux/enfants.
- Anne Pons wrote a modernized adaptation of the book in 1983.

== See also ==
- The Wonderful Adventures of Nils
