= Lamballe station =

Railway station in Lamballe, France

Lamballe Lambal
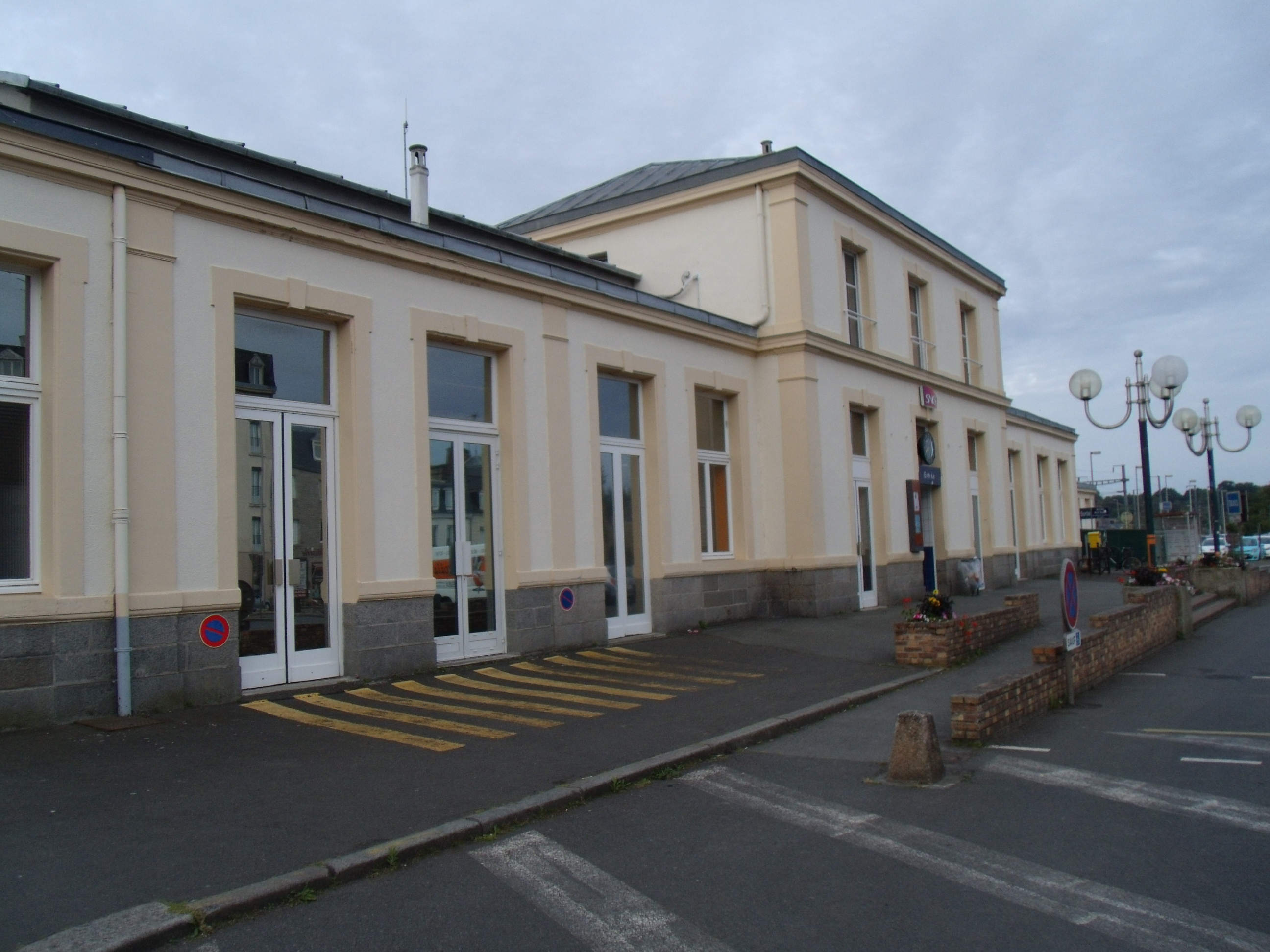
- The station building from the parking

General information
- Location: Boulevard Jobert; 22400 Lamballe; Côtes-d'Armor; France
- Coordinates: 48°27′57″N 2°30′41″W
- Lines: Paris–Brest railway Lison–Lamballe railway
- Platforms: 3
- Tracks: 3

Other information
- Station code: 87473108

History
- Opened: 7 September 1863
Location

Lamballe station (French: Gare de Lamballe; Breton: Ti-gar Lambal) is a railway station serving the town Lamballe, Côtes-d'Armor department, western France. It is situated on the Paris–Brest railway and the branch line to Dinan and Dol-de-Bretagne.

== Services ==
The station is served by high speed trains to Brest, Rennes and Paris, and regional trains to Brest, Saint-Brieuc, Dol-de-Bretagne and Rennes.

== See also ==
- List of SNCF stations in Brittany

Preceding station	SNCF	Following station
Saint-Brieuc towards Brest	TGV	Rennes towards Montparnasse
Saint-Brieuc towards Lannion	TGV	Rennes towards Montparnasse
Preceding station	TER Bretagne	Following station
Saint-Brieuc towards Brest	1	Rennes Terminus
Yffiniac towards Saint-Brieuc	16	Plestan towards Rennes
Yffiniac towards Saint-Brieuc	24	Landébia towards Dol-de-Bretagne
