= Saint-Brieuc station =

Railway station in Saint-Brieuc, France

Saint-Brieuc Sant-Brieg
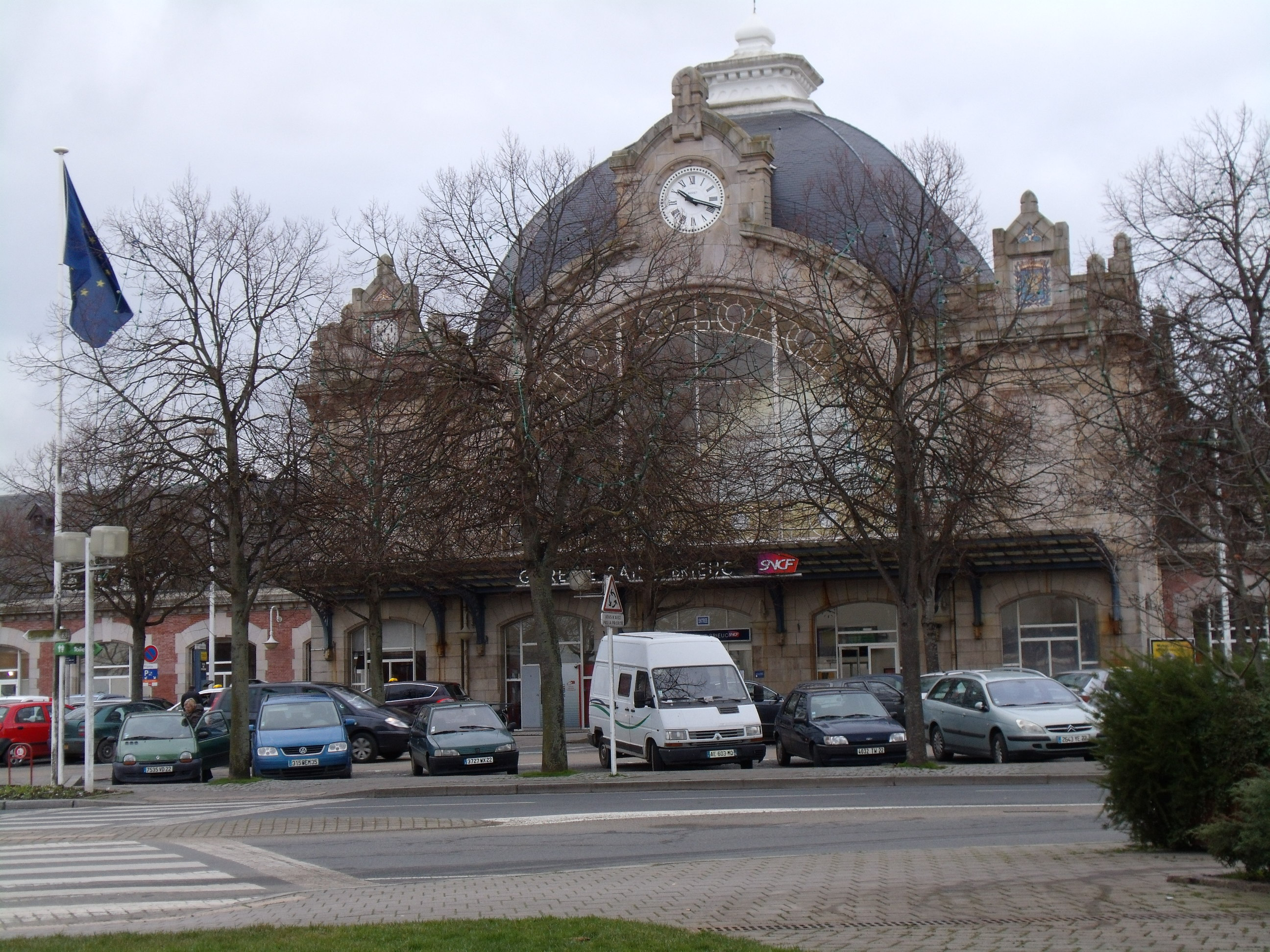
- Saint-Brieuc station

General information
- Location: Saint-Brieuc, Côtes-d'Armor, Brittany, France
- Coordinates: 48°30′27″N 2°45′54″W
- Lines: Paris–Brest railway Saint-Brieuc-Pontivy railway
- Platforms: 3
- Tracks: 5

Other information
- Station code: 87473009

History
- Opened: 7 September 1863

Passengers
- 2024: 1,946,492
Location

Saint-Brieuc station (French: Gare de Saint-Brieuc; Breton: Ti-gar Sant-Brieg) is a railway station serving the town Saint-Brieuc, Côtes-d'Armor department, western France. It is situated on the Paris–Brest railway and the branch line to Pontivy (freight) and Le Légué (sometimes touristic).

== Services ==
The station is served by high speed trains to Brest, Rennes and Paris, and regional trains to Brest, Lannion, Dol-de-Bretagne and Rennes.

| Preceding station | SNCF | Following station |
|---|---|---|
| Guingamp towards Brest | TGV | Lamballe towards Montparnasse |
| Guingamp towards Lannion | TGV | Lamballe towards Montparnasse |
| Preceding station | TER Bretagne | Following station |
| Guingamp towards Brest | 1 | Lamballe towards Rennes |
| Terminus | 16 | Yffiniac towards Rennes |
| La Méaugon towards Lannion | 21 | Terminus |
| Terminus | 24 | Yffiniac towards Dol-de-Bretagne |
