= Lorraine TGV station =

Railway station in Louvigny, France

Lorraine TGV
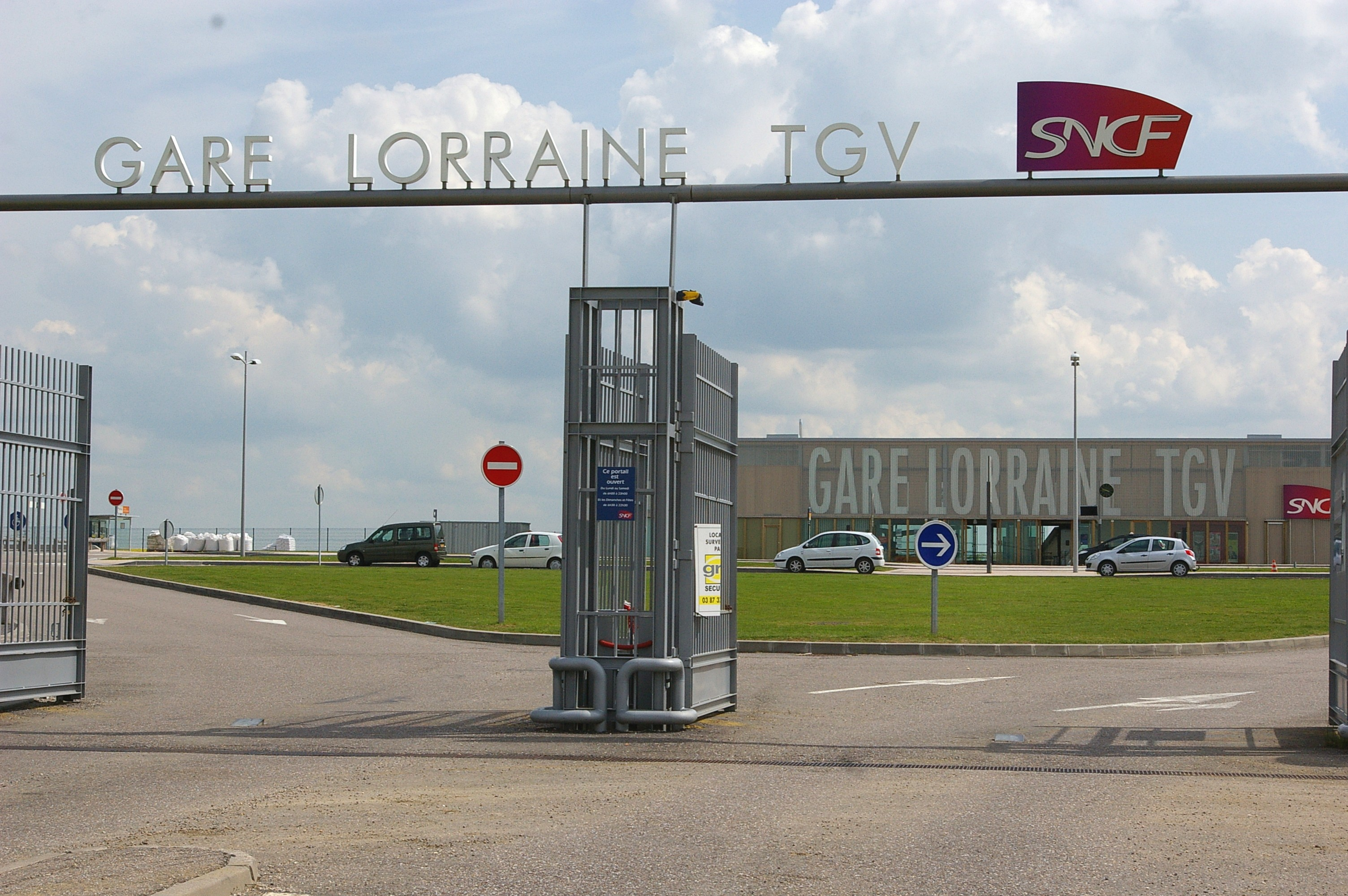

General information
- Location: Route départementale 910; 57420 Louvigny, Moselle; France
- Coordinates: 48°56′51″N 6°10′11″E
- Owner: SNCF
- Operator: SNCF
- Line: LGV Est
- Platforms: 2
- Tracks: 4

Construction
- Architect: Jean-Marie Duthilleul

Other information
- Station code: 87142109

History
- Opened: 10 June 2007

Passengers
- 2023: 493 690
Location

Lorraine TGV station (French: Gare de Lorraine TGV, also known as Metz-Cambrousse) is a railway station located in Louvigny, France, on the LGV Est, a high-speed rail line running from Paris to Strasbourg. Opened in 2007 as part of the first phase of the new line, it is situated near Metz–Nancy–Lorraine Airport, between the cities of Metz and Nancy. As the two other new LGV Est stations (Gare de Champagne-Ardenne TGV and Gare de Meuse TGV) it is served by TGV inOui and Ouigo services.

When built, it was criticised for being too far from any of the towns to be useful. There have been many political disputes since the 1990s to decide if it should be rebuilt at Vandières, Meurthe-et-Moselle, connected with the Metz–Nancy railway line (TER Grand Est). It was the subject of a local referendum in February 2015, in which the majority of votes (58%) were against moving the station to Vandières, but voter turnout was very low (10%). As a result, the project was abandoned.

== Train services ==
Preceding station	SNCF	Following station
Meuse TGV towards Western France	TGV inOui	Strasbourg-Ville towards Eastern France
Preceding station	Ouigo	Following station
Paris-Est Terminus	Ouigo	Strasbourg Terminus

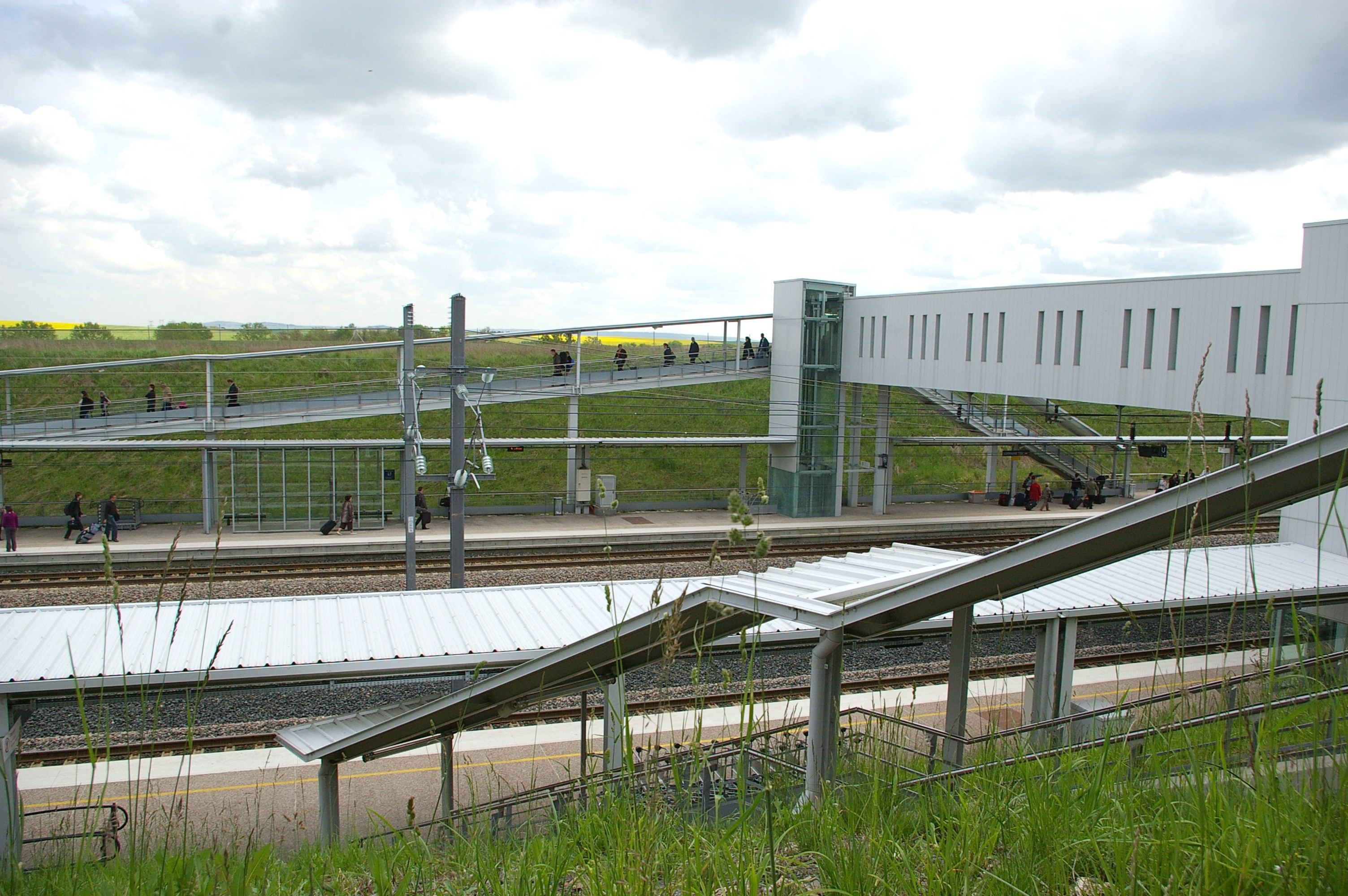
Station platforms and tracks.
