= List of TGV services =

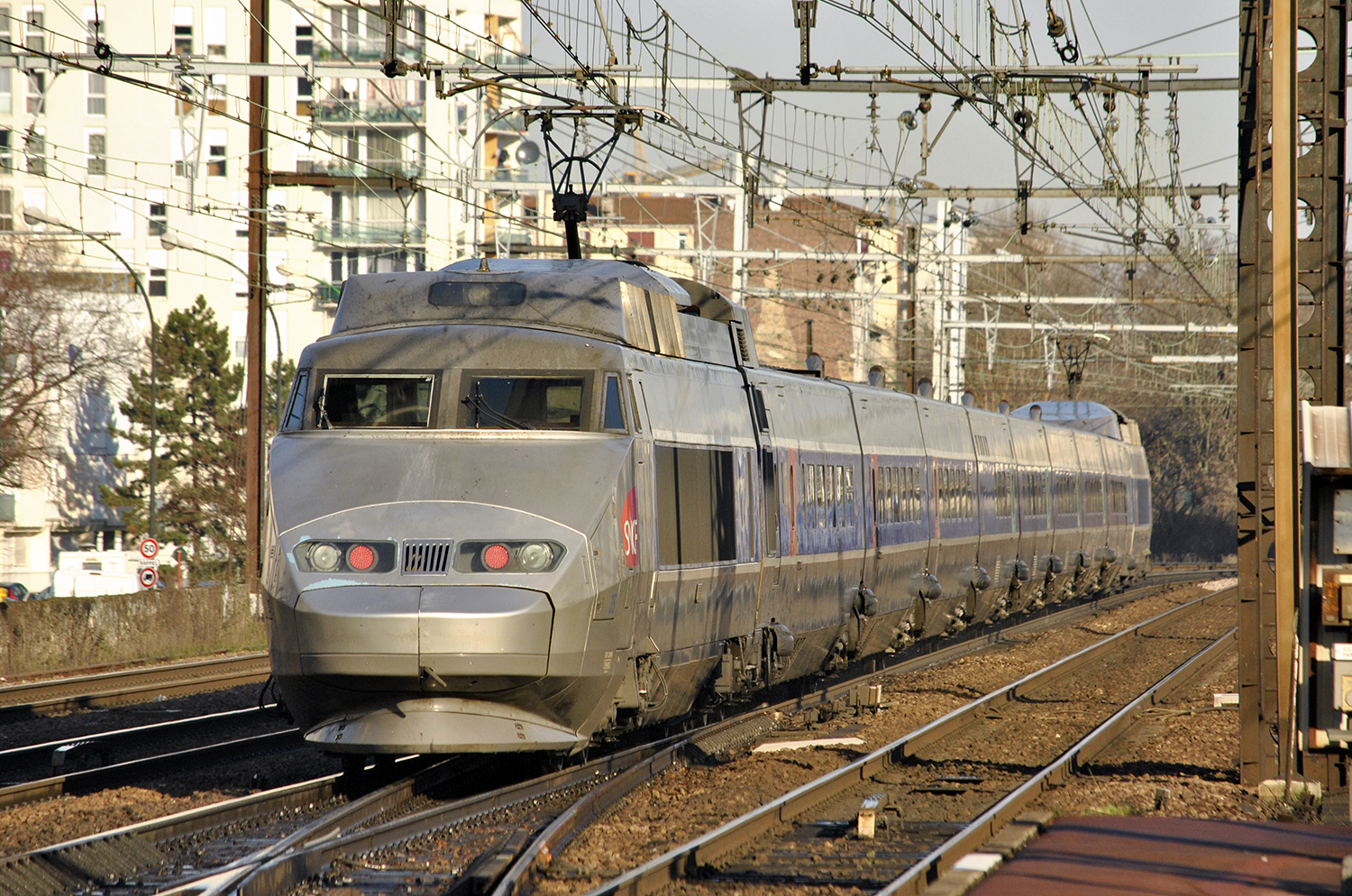
A TGV Sud-Est, the first trainset in regular service.

The TGV (Train à Grande Vitesse) is a high-speed rail service, which started operation in 1981.

This article is a list of all high-speed train services in France. This includes all international high-speed trains that make at least one station stop in France, as well as domestic high-speed trains. Most trains use the LGV network to attain the top speed of 320 km/h (200 mph), but many services also utilise the classic network to reach off-network destinations.

All services are TGV services operated by SNCF, unless otherwise stated. Other operators that run high-speed trains in France include Eurostar, Ouigo, Renfe and Trenitalia France.

== International services ==
Route	Calling points	Notes
France ↔ Switzerland (TGV Lyria)
Paris–Lyon ↔ Zürich–HB	Dijon–Ville ‡, Belfort-Montbéliard TGV, Mulhouse, Basel SBB	Correct Dec 2021
Paris–Lyon ↔ Lausanne (via Dijon)	Dijon–Ville, Dole, Frasne, Vallorbe	Correct Dec 2021
Paris–Lyon ↔ Lausanne/Brig (via Genève)	Bourg en Bresse, Nurieux †, Bellegarde, Genève–Cornavin •, (Lausanne, Vevey, Montreux, Aigle, St. Maurice, Martigny, Sion, Sierre, Visp, Brig)	Correct Dec 2021
Paris–Lyon ↔ Interlaken Ost (via Basel SBB)	Dijon–Ville, Belfort-Montbéliard TGV, Mulhouse, Basel SBB, Olten, Bern, Thun, Spiez, Interlaken West	Cancelled (2020)
Paris–Lyon ↔ Interlaken Ost (via Neuchâtel)	Dijon–Ville, Dole, Frasne, Neuchâtel •, Bern, Thun, Spiez, Interlaken West	Cancelled (2013)
Marseille ↔ Genève–Cornavin (via Basel SBB)	Avignon, Lyon, Mâcon-Ville, Dijon, Besançon Franche-Comté TGV, Belfort–Montbéliard TGV, Mulhouse, Basel SBB, Olten, Solothurn, Biel/Bienne, Neuchâtel, Yverdon-les-Bains, Lausanne	Cancelled (2011)
Marseille ↔ Genève–Cornavin (via Lyon)	Aix-en-Provence, Avignon, Lyon, Bellegarde	Now departing from Nice
France ↔ Italy (TGV France-Italie/Thello)
Paris–Lyon ↔ Milano–Porta Garibaldi	Mâcon Loché TGV, Chambéry, Modane, Bardonecchia †, Oulx, Torino–Porta Susa	Correct Dec 2021
France ↔ Spain
Paris–Lyon ↔ Barcelona–Sants	Valence TGV, Nîmes–Centre, Montpellier–St Roch, Sète, Agde, Béziers, Narbonne, Perpignan, Figueres–Vilafant, Girona	Correct Dec 2021
France ↔ Luxembourg and Germany (TGV/ICE)
Paris–Est ↔ Luxembourg	Metz, Thionville	Correct Dec 2021
Paris–Est ↔ Frankfurt (Main)–Hbf via Saarbrücken	Forbach ‡, Saarbrücken–Hbf, Kaiserslautern–Hbf, Mannheim–Hbf.	Correct Dec 2021
Paris–Est ↔ Frankfurt (Main)–Hbf via Strasbourg	Strasbourg, Karlsruhe–Hbf, Mannheim–Hbf	Correct Dec 2021
Paris–Est ↔ München–Hbf	Strasbourg, Karlsruhe–Hbf, Stuttgart–Hbf •, Ulm–Hbf, Augsburg–Hbf, Pasing (München)	Correct Dec 2021.
Paris–Est ↔ Stuttgart–Hbf	Strasbourg, Karlsruhe–Hbf.	Correct Dec 2021
Strasbourg ↔ Frankfurt (Main)–Hbf	Karlsruhe–Hbf, Mannheim–Hbf.	Correct Dec 2021
Paris–Est ↔ Berlin–Hbf	Strasbourg, Karlsruhe–Hbf, Frankfurt (Main)–Süd.	Correct Dec 2024
Luxembourg ↔ Montpellier–St Roch ① or Nice–Ville ②	Thionville, Metz, Strasbourg, Colmar †, Mulhouse, Belfort Montbéliard TGV, Besançon Franche Comté TGV, Dijon–Ville †, Mâcon–Ville, Lyon–Part Dieu, Nîmes–Centre ①; Avignon TGV ②, Aix en Provence TGV ②, Marseille–St Charles ②, Toulon ②, St Raphaël Valescure ②, Cannes ②, Antibes ②	Correct Dec 2021
France ↔ United Kingdom, Belgium, Germany and the Netherlands as well as United Kingdom ↔ Belgium and the Netherlands via France (Eurostar). Since most inter-regional services to/from Northern France commence/terminate at Brussels–South (the only calling point in Belgium), they are instead listed in the domestic sections of the table on this page.
Paris–Nord ↔ Amsterdam–Centraal	Brussels–South •, Antwerpen–Centraal, Rotterdam–Centraal, Schiphol Airport.	Correct Dec 2021
Paris–Nord ↔ Dortmund–Hbf	Brussels–South, Liège–Guillemins, Aachen–Hbf, Köln–Hbf, Düsseldorf–Hbf, Duisburg–Hbf, Essen–Hbf.	Correct Dec 2021
London–St Pancras ↔ Amsterdam–Centraal	Lille–Europe †, Brussels–South •, Rotterdam–Centraal.	Correct Dec 2021
Paris–Nord ↔ London–St Pancras	.	Correct Dec 2021
Marne-la-Vallée Chessy TGV ↔ London–St Pancras	Lille–Europe.	Correct Dec 2021
Bourg St Maurice ↔ London–St Pancras	Moûtiers.	Correct Dec 2021

† = most or many trains call at this station. ‡ = few trains call at this station. • = most or many trains commence/terminate at this station.

== Inter-regional services ==
Route	Calling points	Notes
Northern and Northwestern France ↔ Eastern France
Brussels–South ↔ Strasbourg	Lille–Europe, Aéroport Charles de Gaulle 2 TGV, Champagne Ardenne TGV, Meuse TGV †, Lorraine TGV	Correct Dec 2021
Northern and Northwestern France ↔ Southern and Southeastern France
Brussels–South ↔ Marseille–St Charles	• Lille–Europe, Aéroport Charles de Gaulle 2 TGV, Marne la Vallée Chessy TGV, Lyon–Part Dieu, Avignon TGV, Aix en Provence TGV. Sometimes trains commence/terminate at Lille–Flandres.	Correct Dec 2021
Brussels–South ↔ Montpellier–Sud de France	• Lille–Europe, Arras †, Aéroport Charles de Gaulle 2 TGV, Marne la Vallée Chessy TGV, Lyon–Part Dieu, Valence TGV, Nîmes–Pont du Gard	Correct Dec 2021
Brussels–South ↔ Perpignan	• Lille–Europe, Arras †, Haute Picardie TGV †, Aéroport Charles de Gaulle 2 TGV, Marne la Vallée Chessy TGV, Lyon–Part Dieu, Valence TGV, Nîmes–Centre, Montpellier–St Roch •, Sète, Agde, Béziers, Narbonne	Correct Dec 2021
Le Havre ↔ Marseille–St Charles	Rouen, Mantes la Jolie, Versailles–Chantiers, Massy TGV, Lyon–Part Dieu, Valence TGV, Avignon TGV	Correct Dec 2021
Cherbourg ↔ Bourg St Maurice	Valognes, Carentan, Lison, Bayeux, Caen, Lisieux, Bernay, Évreux-Normandie, Versailles–Chantiers, Massy TGV, Chambéry-Challes-les-Eaux, Albertville, Moûtiers, Aime la Plagne, Landry	Correct Dec 2021
Northern and Northwestern France ↔ Western and Southwestern France
Brussels–South ↔ Rennes ① or Nantes ②	• Lille–Europe ①②, Haute Picardie TGV, Aéroport Charles de Gaulle 2 TGV, Marne la Vallée Chessy TGV, Massy TGV, Le Mans ①② †; Angers St Laud ②	Correct Dec 2021
Brussels–South ↔ Bordeaux–St Jean	• Lille–Europe, Haute Picardie TGV, Aéroport Charles de Gaulle 2 TGV, Marne la Vallée Chessy TGV, Massy TGV, St Pierre des Corps †, Poitiers †, Angoulême †. Some services commence/terminate at Lille–Flandres.	Correct Dec 2021
Eastern France ↔ Southern and Southeastern France
Nancy ↔ Nice–Ville	• Strasbourg, Colmar †, Mulhouse, Belfort Montbéliard TGV, Besançon Franche Comté TGV, Dijon–Ville †, Mâcon–Ville, Lyon–Part Dieu, Avignon TGV, Aix en Provence TGV, Marseille–St Charles, Toulon, St Raphaël Valescure, Cannes, Antibes	Correct Dec 2021
Eastern France ↔ Western and Southwestern France
Strasbourg ↔ Rennes	Lorraine TGV, Meuse TGV ‡, Champagne Ardenne TGV, Aéroport Charles de Gaulle 2 TGV, Marne la Vallée Chessy TGV, Massy TGV, Le Mans	Correct Dec 2021
Strasbourg ↔ Nantes	Lorraine TGV, Meuse TGV ‡, Champagne Ardenne TGV, Aéroport Charles de Gaulle 2 TGV, Marne la Vallée Chessy TGV, Massy TGV, Le Mans † or St Pierre des Corps ‡, Angers St Laud	Correct Dec 2021
Strasbourg ↔ Bordeaux–St Jean	Lorraine TGV, Meuse TGV, Champagne Ardenne TGV, Aéroport Charles de Gaulle 2 TGV, Marne la Vallée Chessy TGV, Massy TGV, St Pierre des Corps †, Poitiers †, Angoulême †	Correct Dec 2021
Western and Southwestern France ↔ Southern and Southeastern France
Lyon–Perrache ↔ Rennes ① or Nantes ②	Lyon–Part Dieu ①②, Massy TGV ①②, Le Mans ①②; Saumur ② ‡, Angers St Laud ②	Correct Dec 2021
Marseille–St Charles ↔ Rennes ① or Nantes ②	Aix en Provence TGV ①②, Avignon TGV, Valence TGV ‡, Lyon–Part Dieu, Massy TGV ①②, Le Mans ①; Le Mans ② † or St Pierre des Corps ② ‡, Angers St Laud ②	Correct Dec 2021
Montpellier–St Roch ① or Montpellier–Sud de France ② ↔ Rennes ③ or Nantes ④	Nîmes–Centre ①; Nîmes–Pont du Gard ②, Valence TGV ①②③④ †, Lyon–Part Dieu, Massy TGV, Le Mans ①②③④ †; St Pierre des Corps ④ ‡, Angers St Laud ④	Correct Dec 2021
Toulouse–Matabiau ↔ Lyon–Part Dieu	Carcassonne, Narbonne, Béziers, Sète, Montpellier–Sud de France, Nîmes–Pont du Gard, Valence TGV	Correct Dec 2021

† = most or many trains call at this station. ‡ = few trains call at this station. • = most or many trains commence/terminate at this station.

== Intra-regional services ==
Route	Calling points	Notes
Northern France and Northwestern France
Paris–Nord ↔ Tourcoing	Arras ‡, Lille–Flandres •, Croix Wasquehal, Roubaix	Correct Dec 2021
Paris–Nord ↔ Dunkerque (via Lille)	Arras, Lille–Europe	Correct Dec 2021
Paris–Nord ↔ Dunkerque (via Béthune)	Arras, Lens, Béthune, Hazebrouck	Correct Dec 2021
Paris–Nord ↔ Valenciennes	Arras, Douai	Correct Dec 2021
Paris–Nord ↔ Rang du Fliers	Arras, Douai ‡, Lille–Europe, Calais–Fréthun, Boulogne–Ville •, Étaples Le Touquet	Correct Dec 2021
Eastern France
Paris–Est ↔ Sedan (via Reims)	Reims •, Rethel, Charleville–Mézières •	Correct Dec 2021
Paris–Est ↔ Colmar (via Strasbourg)	Lorraine TGV †, Strasbourg, Sélestat	Correct Dec 2021
Paris–Est ↔ Strasbourg (via Sarrebourg)	Nancy, Lunéville, Sarrebourg, Saverne	Correct Dec 2021
Paris–Est ↔ St Dié	Champagne Ardenne TGV †, Meuse TGV, Nancy •, Lunéville	Correct Dec 2021
Paris–Est ↔ Remiremont	Champagne Ardennes TGV, Nancy, Épinal	Correct Dec 2021
Paris–Est ↔ Bar le Duc	Champagne Ardenne TGV, Châlons en Champagne, Vitry le François	Correct Dec 2021
Southern and Southeastern France
Paris–Lyon ↔ Besançon–Viotte	Montbard, Dijon–Ville, Besançon–Franche Comté TGV or Dole	Correct Dec 2021
Paris–Lyon ↔ Lyon–Perrache	Le Creusot TGV, Mâcon Loché TGV, Lyon–Part Dieu	Correct Dec 2021
Paris–Lyon ↔ St Étienne–Châteaucreux	Le Creusot TGV †, Lyon–Part Dieu •	Correct Dec 2021
Paris–Lyon ↔ Nice–Ville	• Lyon–Part Dieu ‡, Avignon TGV ‡, Aix en Provence TGV ‡, Marseille–St Charles •, Toulon, St Raphaël Valescure, Cannes, Antibes	Correct Dec 2021
Paris–Lyon ↔ Annecy	Mâcon Loché TGV, Chambéry, Aix les Bains	Correct Dec 2021
Paris–Lyon ↔ Grenoble	Lyon–St Exupéry TGV	Correct Dec 2021
Paris–Lyon ↔ Évian les Bains	Annemasse, Thonon les Bains	Correct Dec 2021
Paris–Lyon ↔ Bourg St Maurice	Albertville, Moûtiers, Aime la Plagne, Landry	Correct Dec 2021
Paris–Lyon ↔ Miramas	Lyon–St Exupéry TGV, Valence–Ville, Montelimar, Orange, Avignon–Centre, Arles	Correct Dec 2021
Paris–Lyon ↔ Montpellier–St Roch	Valence TGV, Nîmes–Centre	Correct Dec 2021
Paris–Lyon ↔ Perpignan	Valence TGV, Nîmes–Pont du Gard, Montpellier–Sud de France, Sète, Agde, Béziers, Narbonne	Correct Dec 2021
Western and Southwestern France
Paris–Montparnasse ↔ St Malo	Le Mans †, Laval †, Vitré ‡, Rennes •, Dol de Bretagne ‡	Correct Dec 2021
Paris–Montparnasse ↔ Brest ①, Lannion ②, Quimper ③ or St Malo ④ via Rennes	Rennes ①②③④ •, St Brieuc ①②, Guingamp ①②; Morlaix ①; Dol de Bretagne † ④; Redon ③, Vannes ③, Auray ③, Lorient ③	Correct Dec 2021
Paris–Montparnasse ↔ Le Croisic ① or Les Sables d’Olonne ② via Nantes	Sablé sur Sarthe ①② ‡, Angers St Laud ①②, Nantes ①② •, St Nazaire ①, La Baule Escoublac ①; La Roche sur Yon ②	Correct Dec 2021
Paris–Montparnasse ↔ Tours	Vendôme–Villiers sur Loire TGV, St Pierre des Corps	Correct Dec 2021
Paris–Montparnasse ↔ Poitiers	Vendôme–Villiers sur Loire TGV, St Pierre des Corps, Châtellerault, Futuroscope	Correct Dec 2021
Paris–Montparnasse ↔ La Rochelle	St Pierre des Corps ‡, Poitiers †, Niort, Surgères	Correct Dec 2021
Paris–Montparnasse ↔ Bordeaux–St Jean	St Pierre des Corps †, Poitiers, Châtellerault ‡, Angoulême, Libourne ‡	Correct Dec 2021
Paris–Montparnasse ↔ Arcachon ①, Hendaye ②, Tarbes ③ or Toulouse–Matabiau ④ via Bordeaux–St Jean	Bordeaux–St Jean ①②③④ •, Dax ②③, Bayonne ②, Biarritz ②, St Jean de Luz ②; Orthez ③, Pau ③, Lourdes ③; Agen ④, Montauban ④	Correct Dec 2021

† = most or many trains call at this station. ‡ = few trains call at this station. • = most or many trains commence/terminate at this station.

== Ouigo services ==
Route	Calling points	Notes
Lille–Flandres ↔ Marseille–St Charles	Haute Picardie TGV, Aéroport Charles de Gaulle 2 TGV, Marne la Vallée Chessy TGV, Lyon–St Exupéry, Avignon TGV, Aix en Provence TGV	Correct Dec 2021
Lille–Flandres ↔ Lyon–Perrache	Aéroport Charles de Gaulle 2 TGV, Marne la Vallée Chessy TGV, Lyon-Part Dieu	Correct Dec 2021
Tourcoing ↔ Montpellier–Sud de France	Aéroport Charles de Gaulle 2 TGV, Marne la Vallée Chessy TGV, Lyon–Part Dieu, Valence TGV, Nîmes–Pont du Gard	Correct Dec 2021
Tourcoing ↔ Bordeaux–St Jean	Haute Picardie TGV, Aéroport Charles de Gaulle 2 TGV, Marne la Vallée Chessy TGV, Massy TGV, St Pierre des Corps, Poitiers, Angoulême	Correct Dec 2021
Paris–Montparnasse ↔ Toulouse–Matabiau	Angoulême †, Bordeaux–St Jean, Agen, Montauban	Correct Dec 2021
Paris–Montparnasse ↔ Nantes	Massy TGV, Le Mans, Angers St Laud	Correct Dec 2021
Paris–Montparnasse ↔ Rennes	Le Mans	Correct Dec 2021
Paris–Lyon ↔ Montpellier–St Roch	Lyon–St Exupéry TGV, Nîmes–Centre	Correct Dec 2021
Paris–Lyon ↔ Nice–Ville	Lyon–St Exupéry TGV, Aix en Provence TGV, Toulon, St Raphaël Valescure, Cannes, Antibes. Some services commence/terminate at Marseille–St Charles.	Correct Dec 2021
