= Dol-de-Bretagne station =

Railway station in Dol-de-Bretagne, France

Coordinates: 48°32′39″N 1°45′00″W

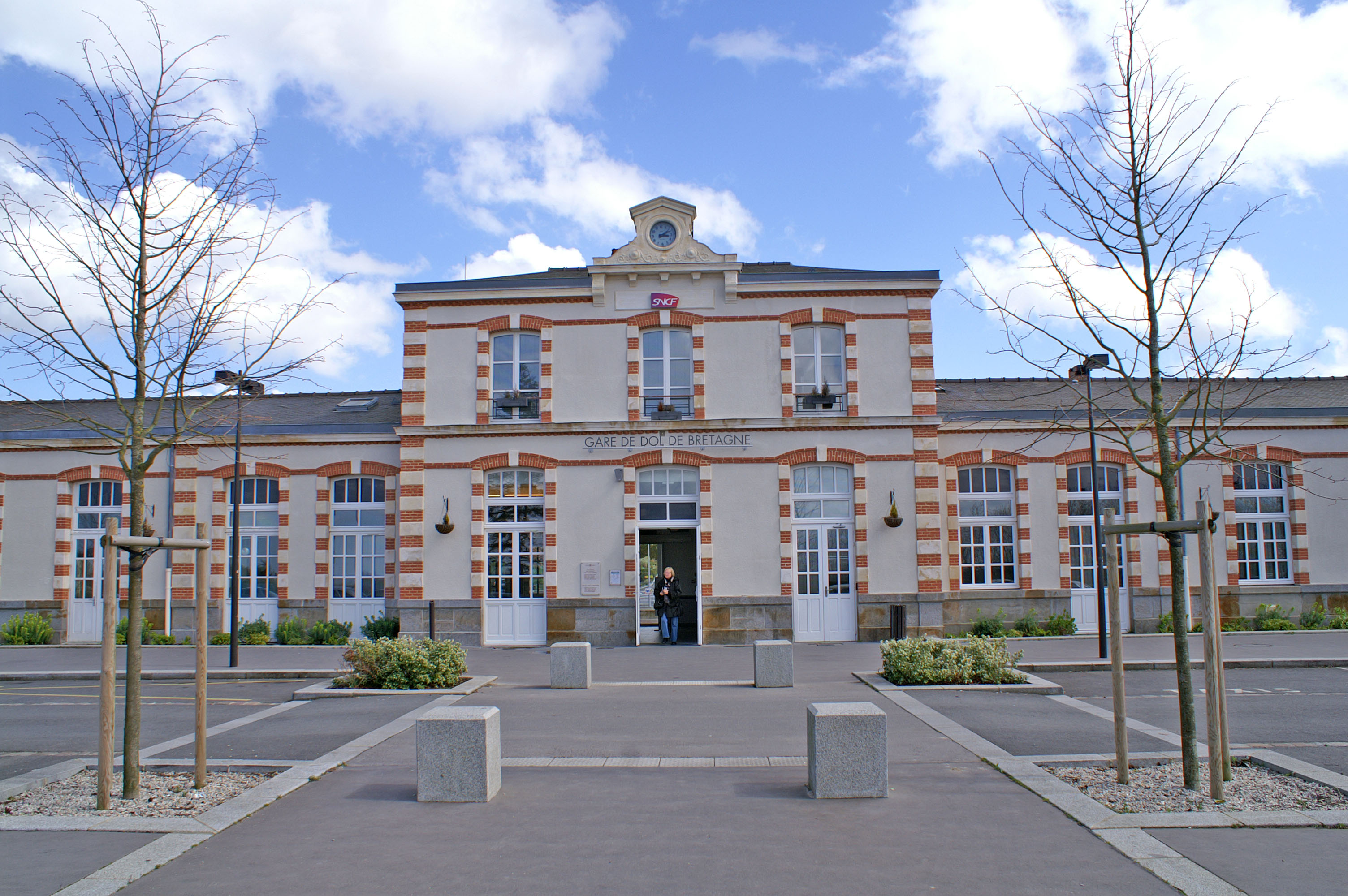
Gare de Dol-de-Bretagne

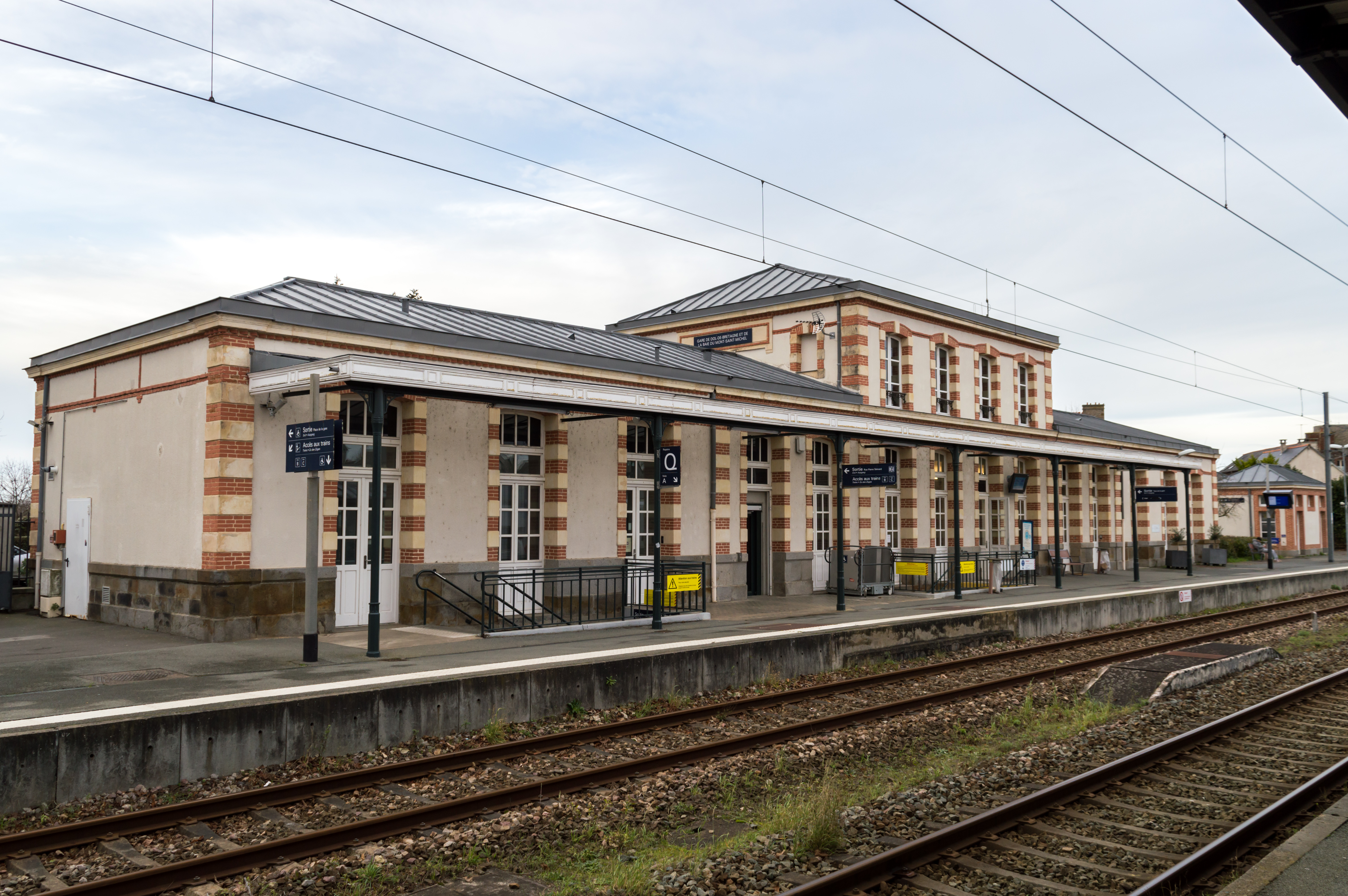
Station seen from the platforms

Dol-de-Bretagne station (French: Gare de Dol-de-Bretagne) is a railway station serving the town Dol-de-Bretagne, Ille-et-Vilaine department, western France.

The station is situated on the Rennes–Saint-Malo and the Lison–Lamballe railways.

== Services ==
The station is served by high speed trains to Rennes and Paris, and regional trains to Saint-Malo, Saint-Brieuc, Granville and Rennes.

Preceding station	SNCF	Following station
Saint-Malo Terminus	TGV	Rennes towards Montparnasse
Preceding station	TER Bretagne	Following station
La Fresnais towards Saint-Malo	13	Bonnemain towards Rennes
Plerguer towards Saint-Brieuc	24	Terminus
Preceding station	TER Normandie	Following station
Pontorson-Mont-Saint-Michel towards Granville	Citi	Rennes Terminus
