= Champagne-Ardenne TGV station =

Railway station in France

Champagne-Ardenne
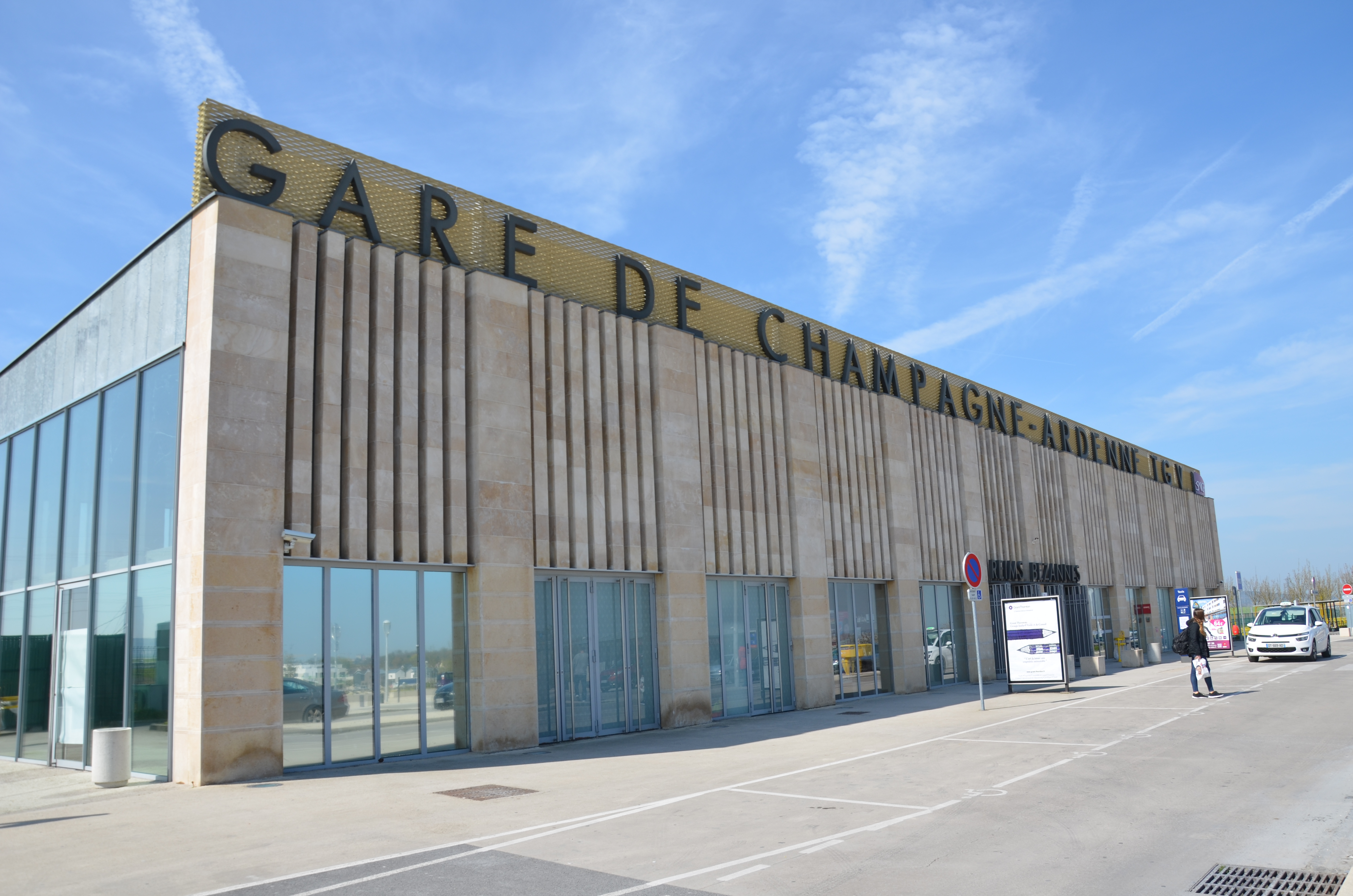

General information
- Location: Bezannes, France
- Coordinates: 49°12′54″N 3°59′38″E
- Owner: SNCF
- Operator: SNCF
- Line: LGV Est

Construction
- Architect: Pierre-Michel Desgrange

Other information
- Station code: 87171926

History
- Opened: 10 June 2007

Passengers
- 2024: 1,337,827
Services
| Preceding station | SNCF | Following station |
|---|---|---|
| Paris-Est Terminus | TGV inOui | Meuse TGV towards Strasbourg |
| Aéroport Charles de Gaulle towards Brussels-South or Lille-Europe | TGV inOui | Meuse TGV towards Strasbourg |
| Marne-la-Vallée–Chessy towards Bordeaux, Nantes or Rennes | TGV inOui | Meuse TGV towards Strasbourg |
| Paris-Est Terminus | TGV inOui | Châlons-en-Champagne towards Bar-le-Duc |
| Paris-Est Terminus | TGV inOui | Meuse TGV towards Luxembourg |
| Preceding station | TER Grand Est | Following station |
| Terminus | C01 | Reims towards Sedan |
| Terminus | C09 | Reims-Maison-Blanche towards Reims |
Location

Champagne-Ardenne TGV station (French: Gare de Champagne-Ardenne TGV) is a railway station located in Bezannes, France that opened in 2007 along with the first phase of the LGV Est, a high-speed rail line running from Paris to Strasbourg. It is situated about five kilometres south of Reims; the station is a stop for TGV, Ouigo and TER Grand Est services.

== Travel times ==
27 TGV trains serve the station daily in each direction, for a total of 54 trains per day.

It is directly connected to the stations of: Gare de l'Est, Aéroport Charles de Gaulle 2 – TGV, Marne-la-Vallée – Chessy and Massy TGV in Île-de-France. TGV services connect it directly in Lille-Europe, Rennes (one train), Nantes, Bordeaux-Saint-Jean and Strasbourg-Ville. However, Champagne-Ardenne TGV is not served by the TGV Sud-Est, and there is no direct connection to Lyon and Avignon:

- Marne-la-Vallée – 30 minutes
- Paris – 40 minutes
- Massy TGV – 1 hour
- Lille – 1 hour 25 minutes
- Nantes and Rennes – 3 hours 15 minutes
- Bordeaux – 4 hours 25 minutes

There are also TGV trains to Gare de Reims, the older station in downtown Reims. The station is also served by the Reims tramway, which provides a connection to the city of Reims.

== See also ==
- List of SNCF stations in Grand Est
