= Saint-Malo station =

Railway station in Saint-Malo, France

Coordinates: 48°38′48″N 2°0′14″W

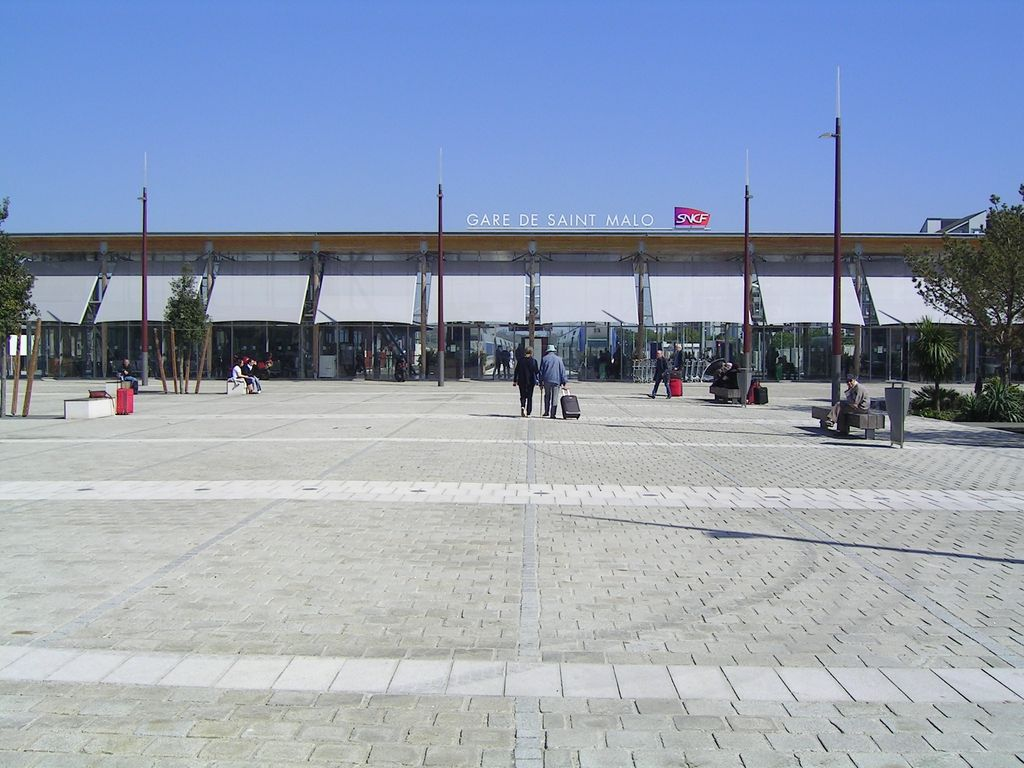
Gare de Saint-Malo

Saint-Malo station (French: Gare de Saint-Malo) is a railway station serving the town Saint-Malo, Ille-et-Vilaine department, western France.

The station is situated on the Rennes–Saint-Malo railway.

== Services ==
The station is served by high speed trains to Rennes and Paris, and regional trains to Dol-de-Bretagne and Rennes.

Preceding station	SNCF	Following station
Terminus	TGV	Dol-de-Bretagne towards Montparnasse
Preceding station	TER Bretagne	Following station
Terminus	13	La Gouesnière-Cancale towards Rennes
Ferry services
Terminus	Brittany Ferries; Ferry	Portsmouth
Terminus	Brittany Ferries; Ferry	Guernsey(Limited service)
Terminus	Brittany Ferries high-speed catamaran	Jersey(Limited service)
Terminus	Brittany Ferries high-speed catamaran	Guernsey
Terminus	Brittany Ferries high-speed catamaran	Poole
Terminus	DFDS Seaways high-speed catamaran	Jersey
Terminus	DFDS Seaways; Ferry (Limited Service)	Jersey
Terminus	DFDS Seaways; Ferry (Limited Service)	Portsmouth
