= Rennes–Saint-Malo railway =

French regional rail line

Rennes - Saint-Malo railway
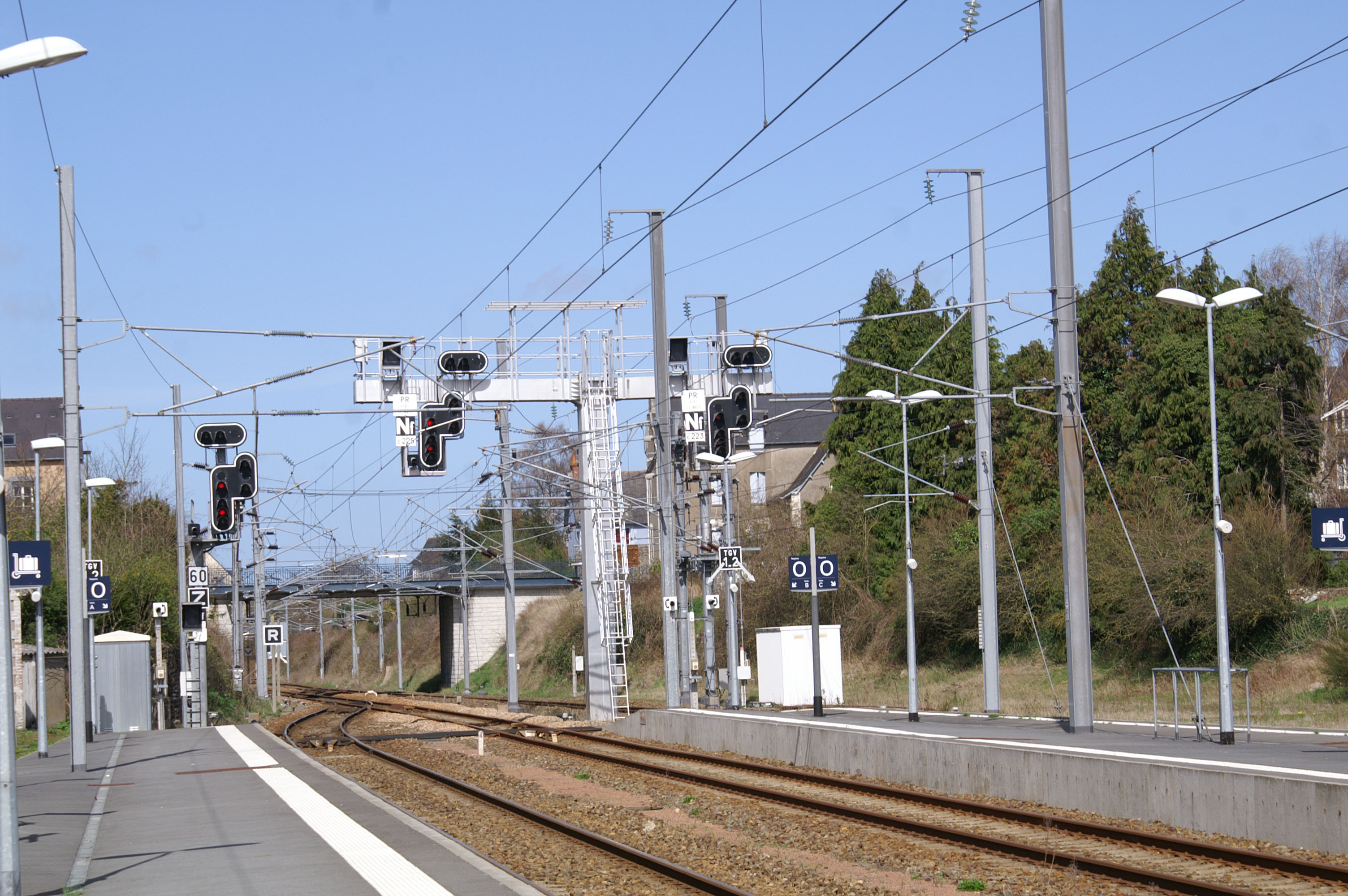

Overview
- Status: Operational
- Owner: RFF
- Locale: France (Brittany)
- Termini: Rennes station; Saint-Malo station

Service
- System: SNCF
- Operator(s): SNCF

History
- Opened: 1864

Technical
- Line length: 81 km (50 mi)
- Number of tracks: Double track
- Track gauge: 1,435 mm (4 ft 8 1/2 in) standard gauge
- Electrification: since 2005 25 kV 50 Hz

The railway from Rennes to Saint-Malo is a regional railway line between Rennes and Saint-Malo in Ille-et-Vilaine, western France.

== Route ==
These are the main stations:

The line begins in Rennes station, then passes the Dol-de-Bretagne station, and ends in Saint-Malo station.

== Line history ==
The line opened on June 27, 1864.
