= Paris–Brest railway =

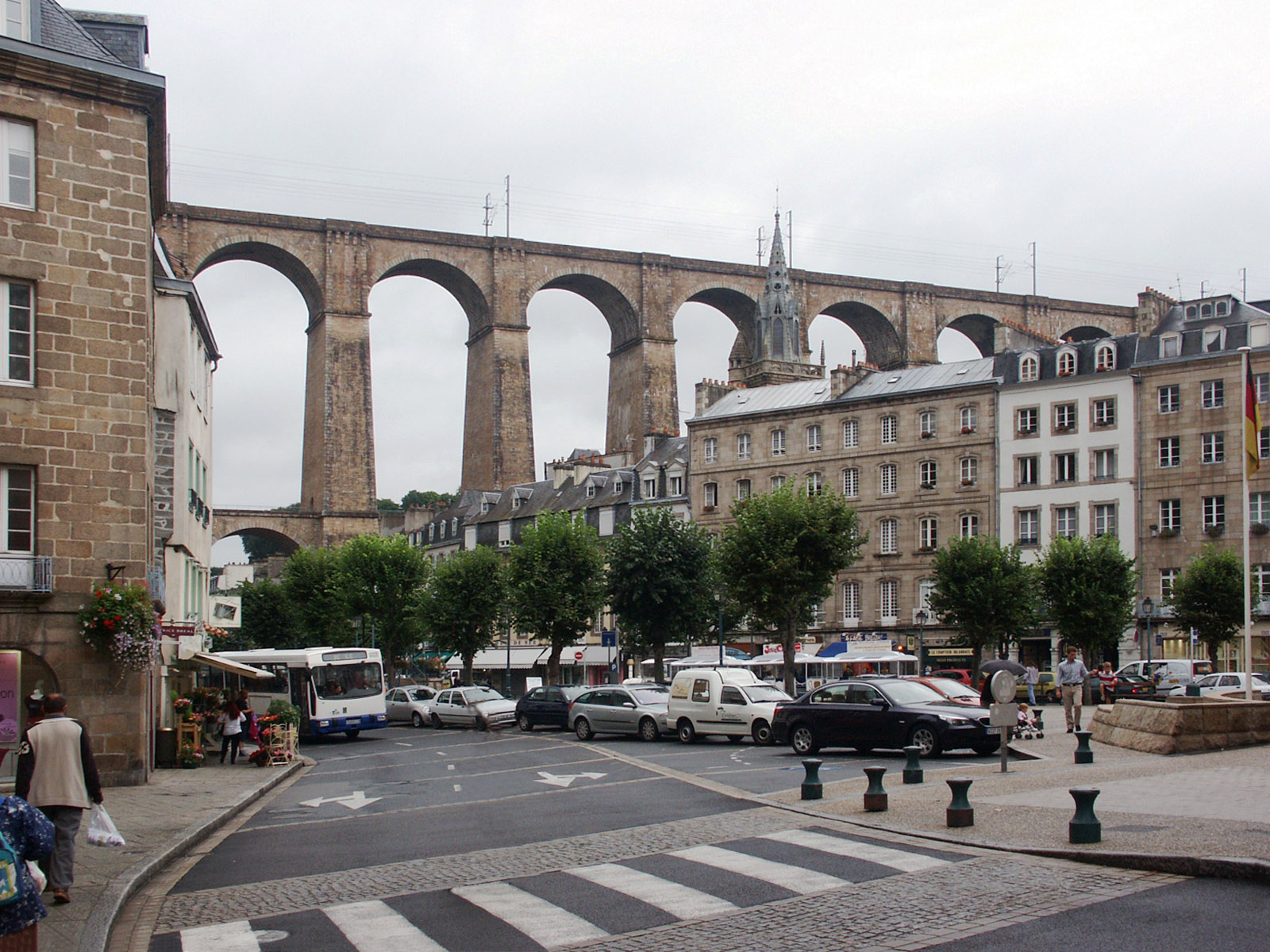
- Railway viaduct in Morlaix

Overview
- Status: Operational
- Owner: RFF
- Locale: France (Île-de-France, Centre-Val de Loire, Normandy, Pays de la Loire, Brittany)
- Termini: Gare Montparnasse, Paris; Brest station

Service
- System: SNCF
- Operator(s): SNCF

History
- Opened: 1840-1865

Technical
- Line length: 622 km (386 mi)
- Number of tracks: Double track
- Track gauge: 1,435 mm (4 ft 8 1/2 in) standard gauge
- Electrification: Paris–Le Mans 1.5 kV DC, Le Mans–Brest 25 kV 50 Hz

The railway from Paris to Brest is a 622-kilometre long railway line in France that connects Paris and the western port city Brest, via Le Mans and Rennes. It is used for passenger (express, regional and suburban) and freight traffic.

The railway was opened in several stages between 1840 and 1865.

== Route ==
Map of the line

The railway leaves Paris-Montparnasse in southwestern direction for the first 3 km, and turns west at Malakoff, skirting the southern quarters of the city of Versailles. It turns southwest again until Maintenon, where it starts following the river Eure upstream, passing Chartres. At La Loupe, it leaves the Eure valley in southwestern direction until it enters the Huisne valley at Condé-sur-Huisne. It follows the Huisne downstream to Le Mans, where it turns northwest. At Sillé-le-Guillaume it turns west, crossing the river Mayenne in Laval.

After Vitré, it follows the river Vilaine downstream to Rennes. It continues roughly northwest to Lamballe, where it turns west. Just before Saint-Brieuc (at Yffiniac), it nearly touches the English Channel coast. It continues west through Guingamp and Morlaix until it reaches its terminus Brest, at a bay of the Atlantic Ocean.

TGV high speed trains with destination Le Mans and further west use the LGV Atlantique between Paris and Connerré (20 km east of Le Mans) instead of the "classic" line.

=== Main stations ===
- Gare Montparnasse (Paris)
- Versailles Chantiers station
- Chartres station
- Le Mans station
- Laval station
- Vitré station
- Rennes station
- Lamballe station
- Saint-Brieuc station
- Guingamp station
- Plouaret-Trégor station
- Morlaix station
- Landerneau station
- Brest station

== Line history ==
The railway Paris–Brest was first built and exploited by the Chemins de fer de l'Ouest. The oldest section of the line is the part between Paris and Viroflay, built in 1840 as part of the railway between Paris and the city of Versailles. The part between Viroflay and Chartres was opened in 1849, Chartres–La Loupe in 1852, La Loupe–Le Mans in 1854, Le Mans–Laval in 1855, Laval–Rennes in 1857, followed by Rennes–Guingamp in 1863 and Guingamp–Brest in 1865.

== Technical information ==
The line is on a double track in its entirety. The gauge is the 1,435 mm (4 ft 8 1/2 in) standard gauge. The overhead current is 1.5 kV DC between Paris and Le Mans, and 25 kV 50 Hz between Le Mans and Brest. The train protection system Contrôle de vitesse par balises (KVB) is operational on the Paris - Saint-Brieuc section. The signaling is either automatic block signaling (block automatique lumineux (BAL)) or block automatique à permissivité restreinte (BAPR) on the whole line.

== Bibliography ==
- Euzen, Jean-Pierre (2013). "L'arrivée du chemin de fer en Bretagne Nord" (in French). Paris: Riveneuve éditions. ISBN 978-2-36013-171-6
- Euzen, Jean-Pierre (2015). "L'étoile ferrée morlaisienne" (in French). Paris: Riveneuve éditions. ISBN 978-2-36013-295-9
