= Vavin station =

Metro station in Paris, France

Vavin
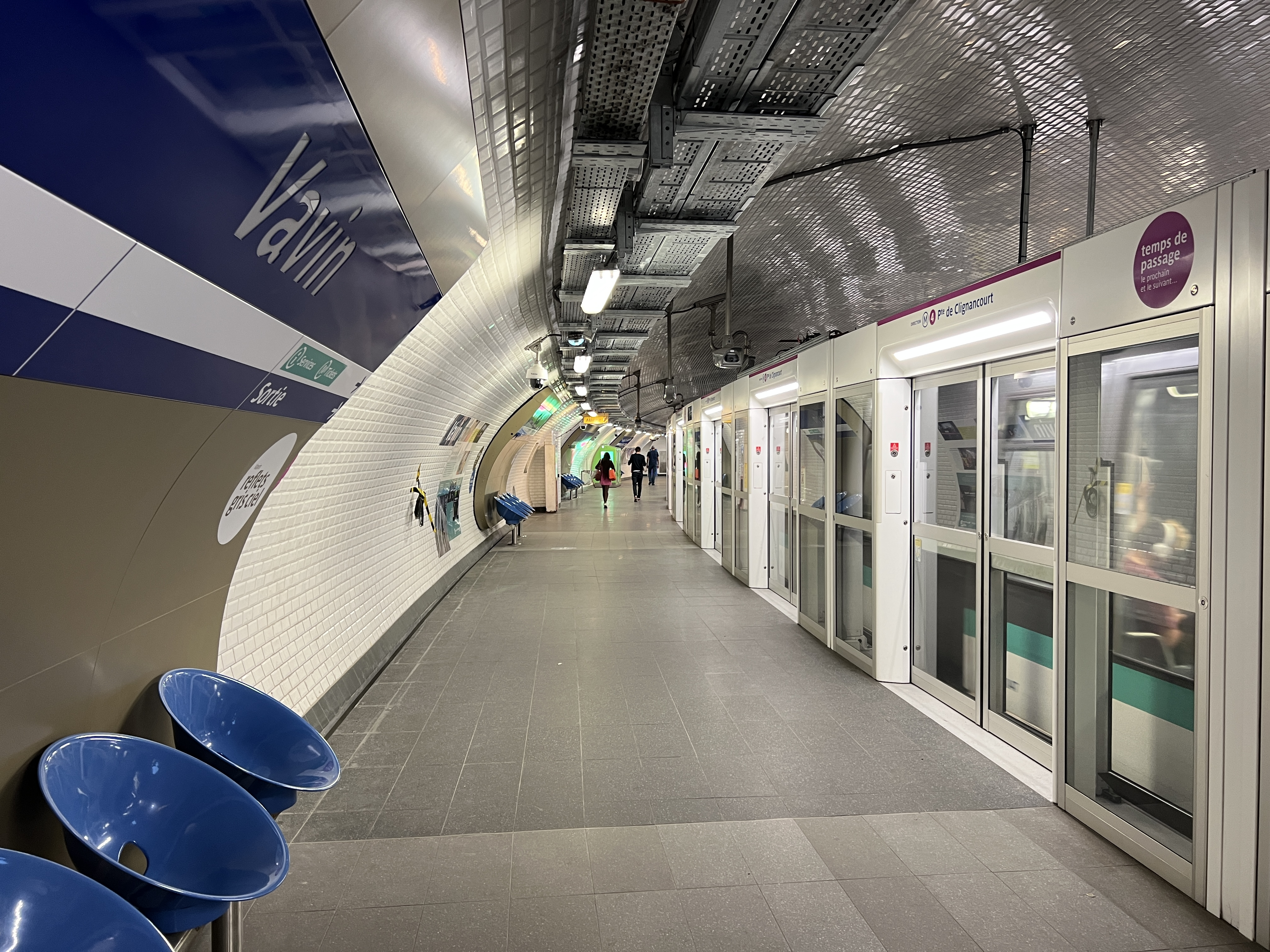
- Vavin after the installation of platform screen doors

General information
- Location: 101, boul. Montparnasse; 103, boul. Montparnasse; 106, boul. Montparnasse; 108, boul. Montparnasse; 6th arrondissement of Paris; Île-de-France; France
- Coordinates: 48°50′32.04″N 2°19′44.22″E
- Owner: RATP
- Operator: RATP
- Line: Paris Metro Paris Metro Line 4
- Platforms: 2 (2 side platforms)
- Tracks: 2

Construction
- Accessible: No

Other information
- Station code: 0407
- Fare zone: 1

History
- Opened: 9 January 1910

Passengers
- 1,322,588 (2021)

Services
Preceding station	Paris Metro	Following station
Raspail towards Bagneux–Lucie Aubrac	Line 4	Montparnasse–Bienvenüe towards Porte de Clignancourt
Location
- Location within Paris

Vavin (French pronunciation: [vavɛ̃]) is a station of the Paris Métro on line 4 on the border of the 6th arrondissement and 14th arrondissement, under Place Pablo-Picasso at the intersection of Boulevard du Montparnasse and Boulevard Raspail. It is named after the nearby rue Vavin, named after 19th-century statesman Alexis Vavin (1792-1863).

It has the peculiarity of having two connections to other lines on the track towards Bagneux–Lucie Aubrac; one from line 12 just before entering the station and one towards line 6 just after leaving the station.

== History ==
The station was opened on 9 January 1910 as part of the connecting section of the line under the Seine between Châtelet and Raspail.

As part of the "Un métro + beau" programme by the RATP, the station's corridors were renovated and modernised on 2 December 2005.

As part of the automation of line 4, the platforms were partially renovated and modernised. Its platform levels were raised to accommodate the installation of platform screen doors which took place from July to August 2020. This was in addition to new lighting being installed, tiling the floor, and the installation of new seats.

In 2018, the station was used by 2,182,742 passengers, making it the 244th busiest of the Métro network out of 302 stations.

In 2019, the station was used by 2,021,987 passengers, making it the 244th busiest of the Métro network out of 302 stations.

In 2020, the station was used by 1,009,201 passengers amidst the COVID-19 pandemic, making it the 241st busiest of the Métro network out of 304 stations.

In 2021, the station was used by 1,009,201 passengers, making it the 249th busiest of the Métro network out of 304 stations.

== Passenger services ==
=== Access ===
The station has 4 accesses:

- Access 1: Boulevard Raspail
- Access 2: rue Vavin
- Access 3: Boulevard du Montparnasse
- Access 4: rue Delambre

=== Station layout ===
Street Level
B1	Mezzanine
Platform level	Side platform with PSDs, doors will open on the right
Platform level	Northbound	← toward Porte de Clignancourt (Montparnasse – Bienvenüe)
Platform level	Southbound	toward Bagneux–Lucie Aubrac (Raspail) →
Platform level	Side platform with PSDs, doors will open on the right

=== Platforms ===
The station has a standard configuration with 2 tracks surrounded by 2 side platforms, with platform screen doors installed since August 2020.

=== Other connections ===
The station is also served by lines 58, 68, 82, and 91 of the RATP bus network, and at night, by lines N01 and N02 of the Noctilien bus network.

== Nearby ==
- Paris-Panthéon-Assas University

== Gallery ==
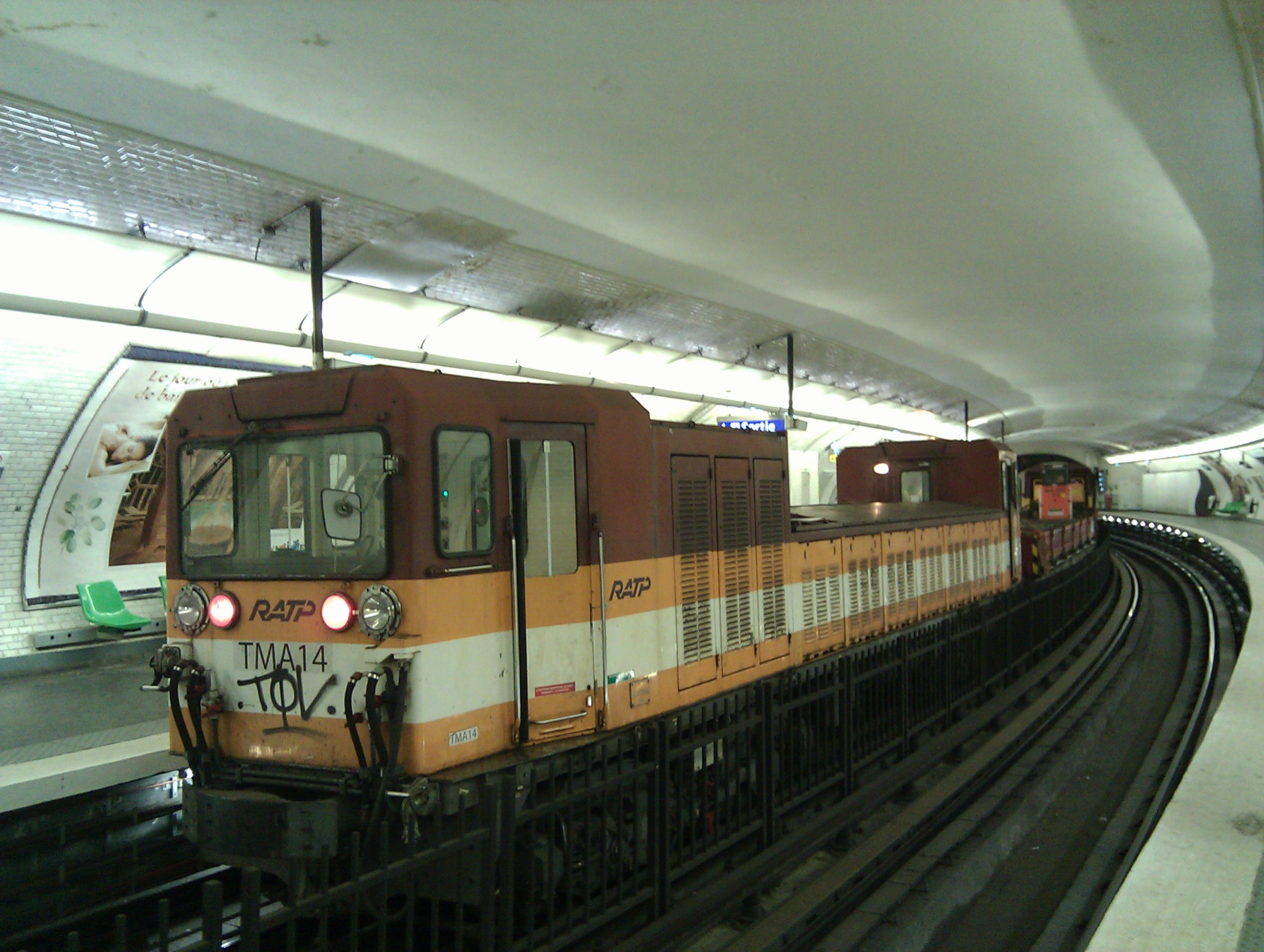
Work train at Vavin before the installation of platform screen doors

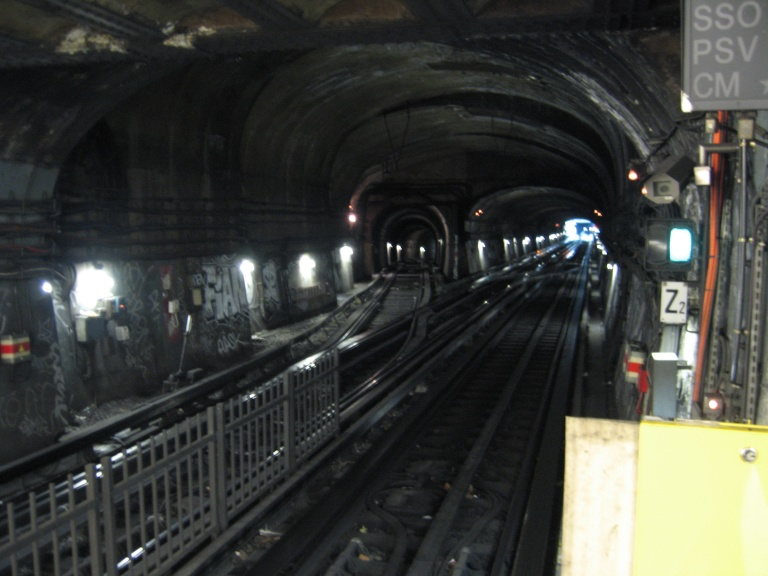
Connection to line 12

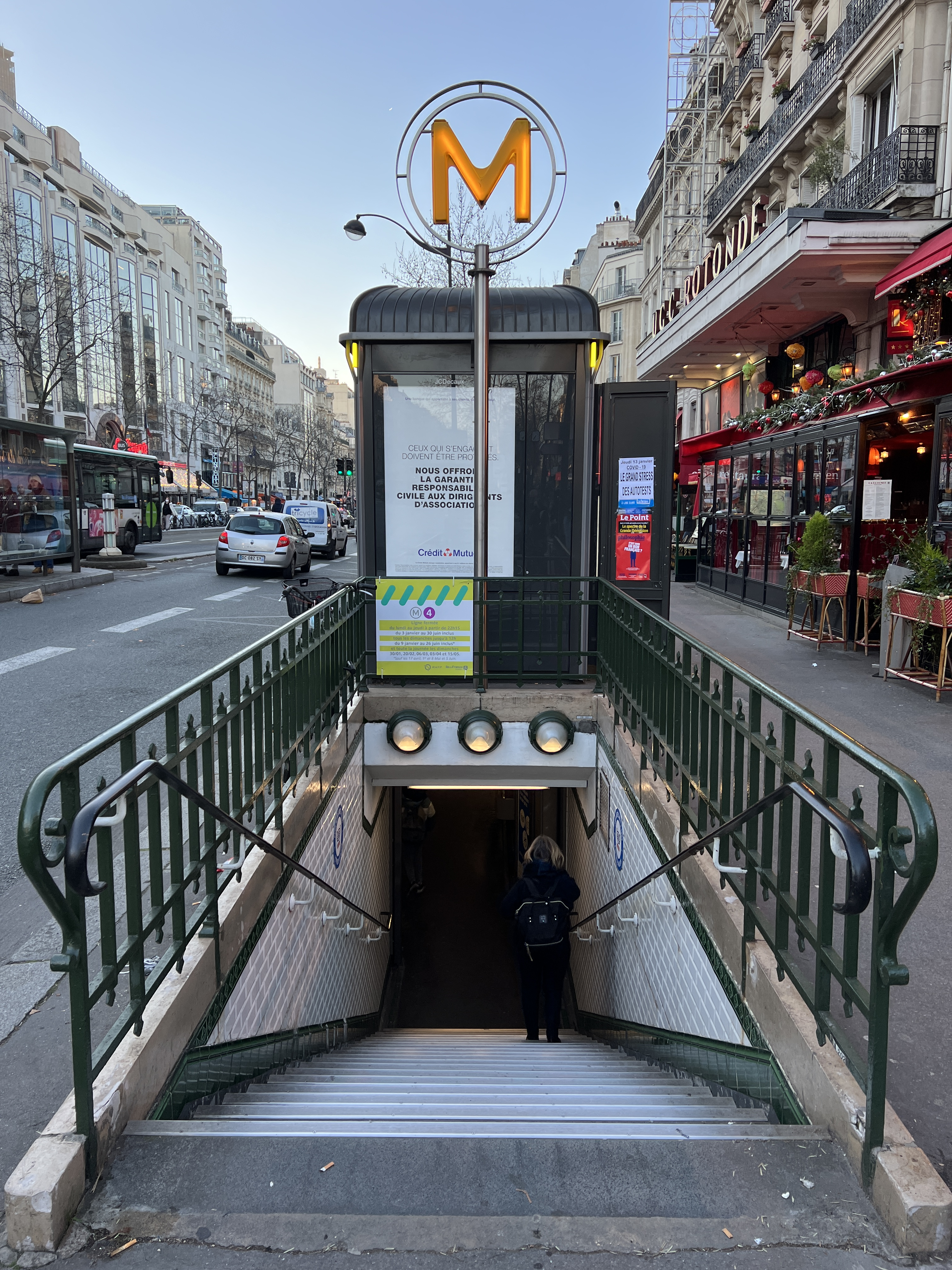
Access 1

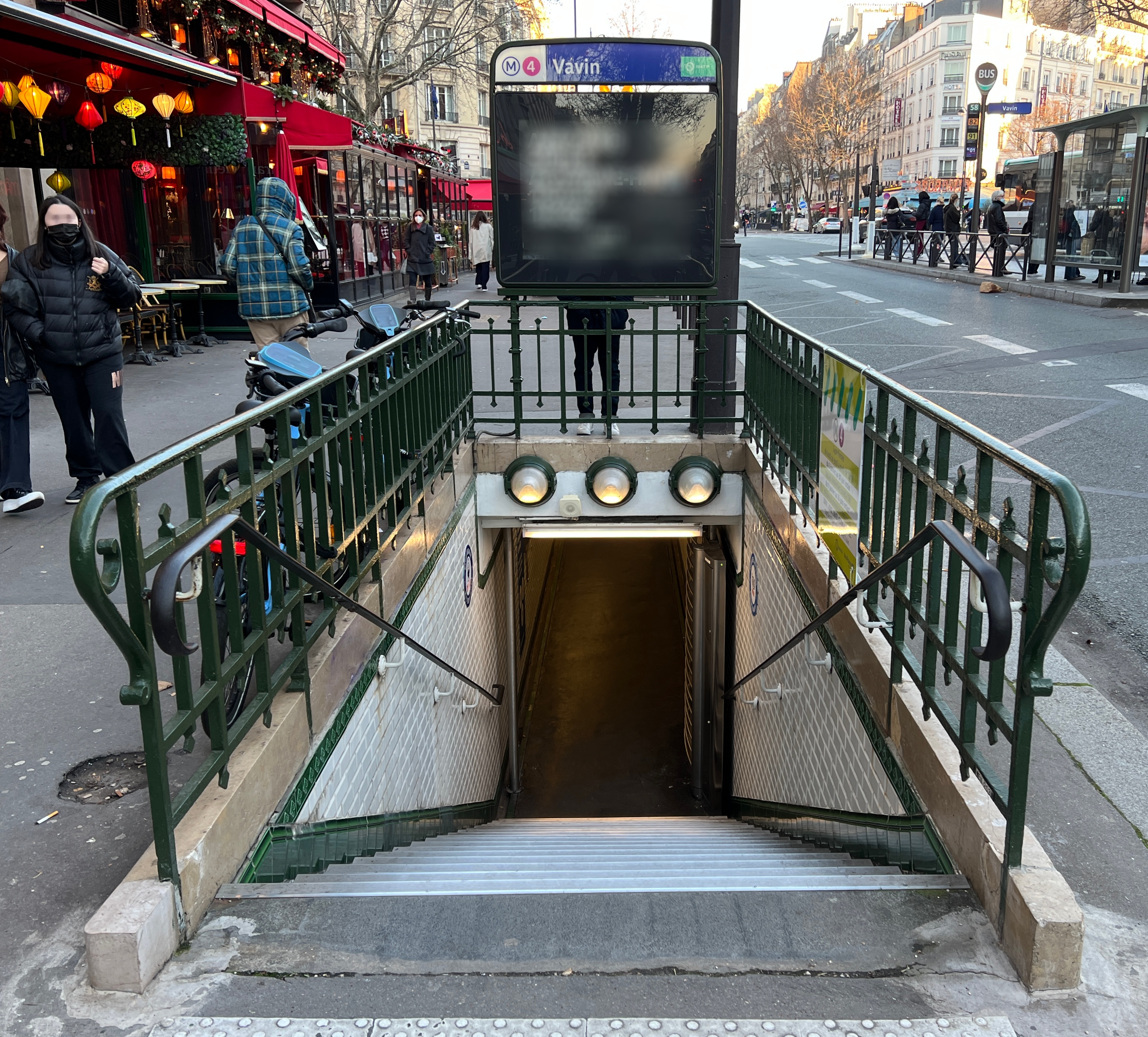
Access 2

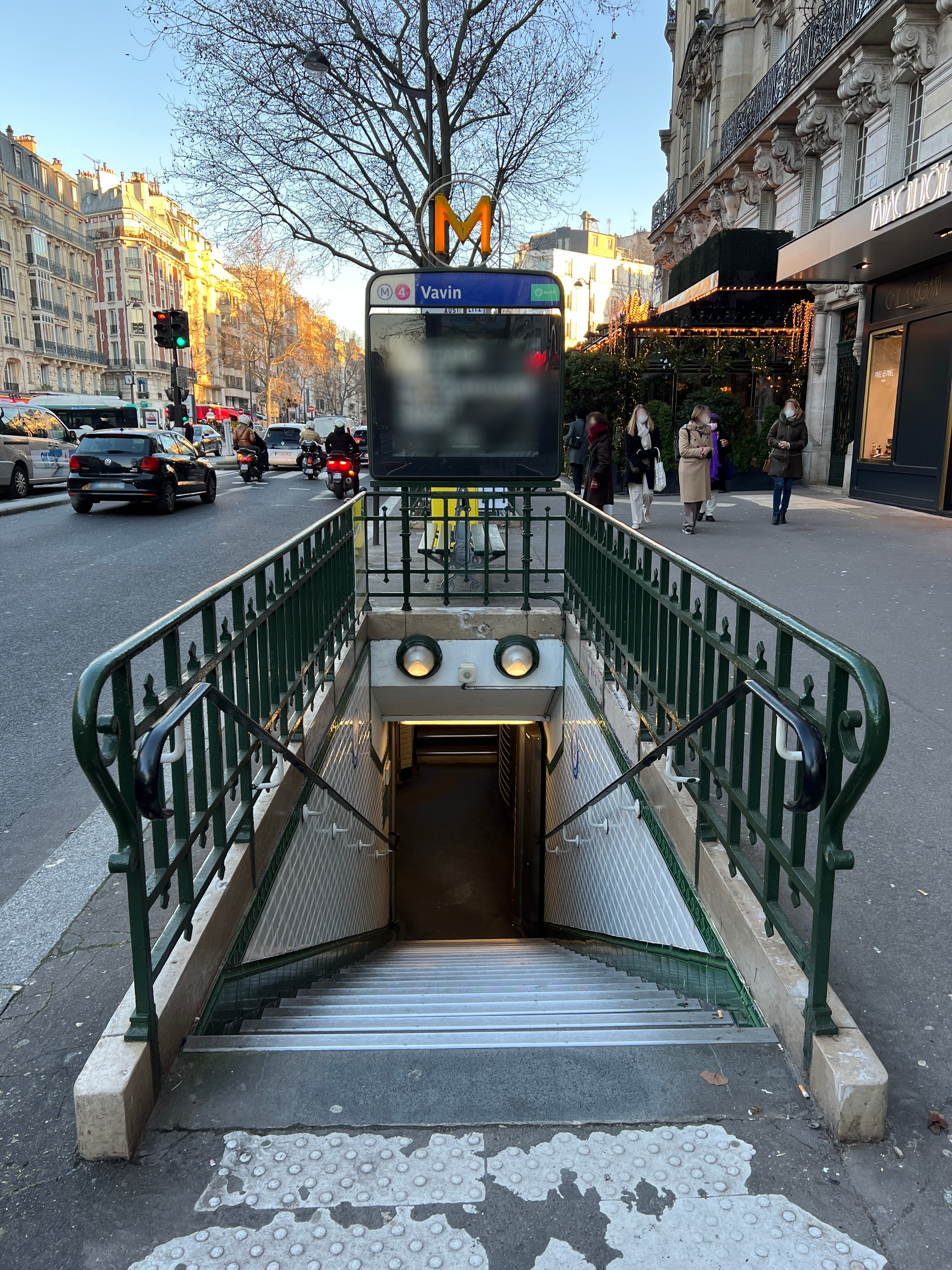
Access 3

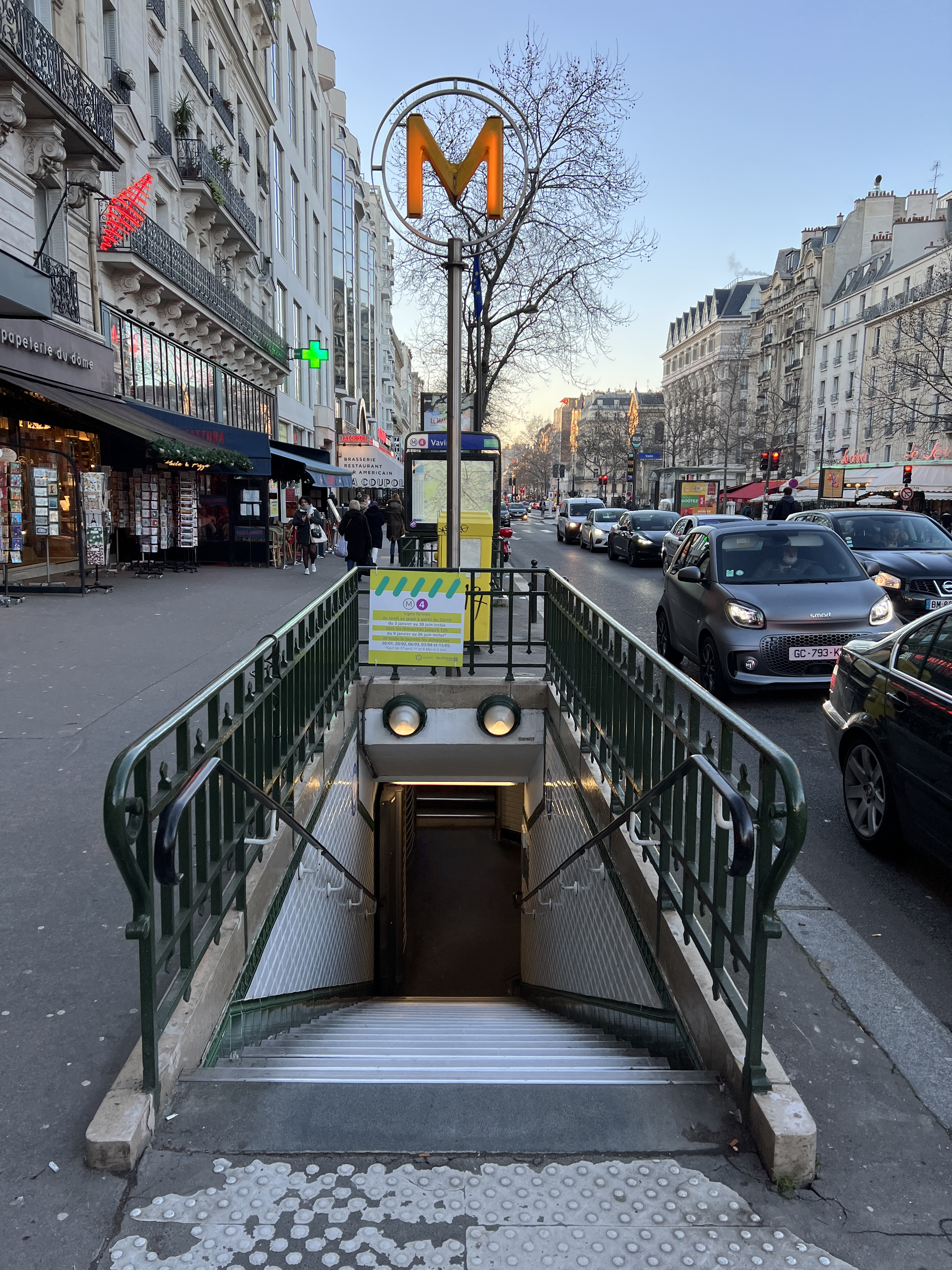
Access 4
