= Massy TGV station =

TGV railway station in Massy, France

Massy TGV
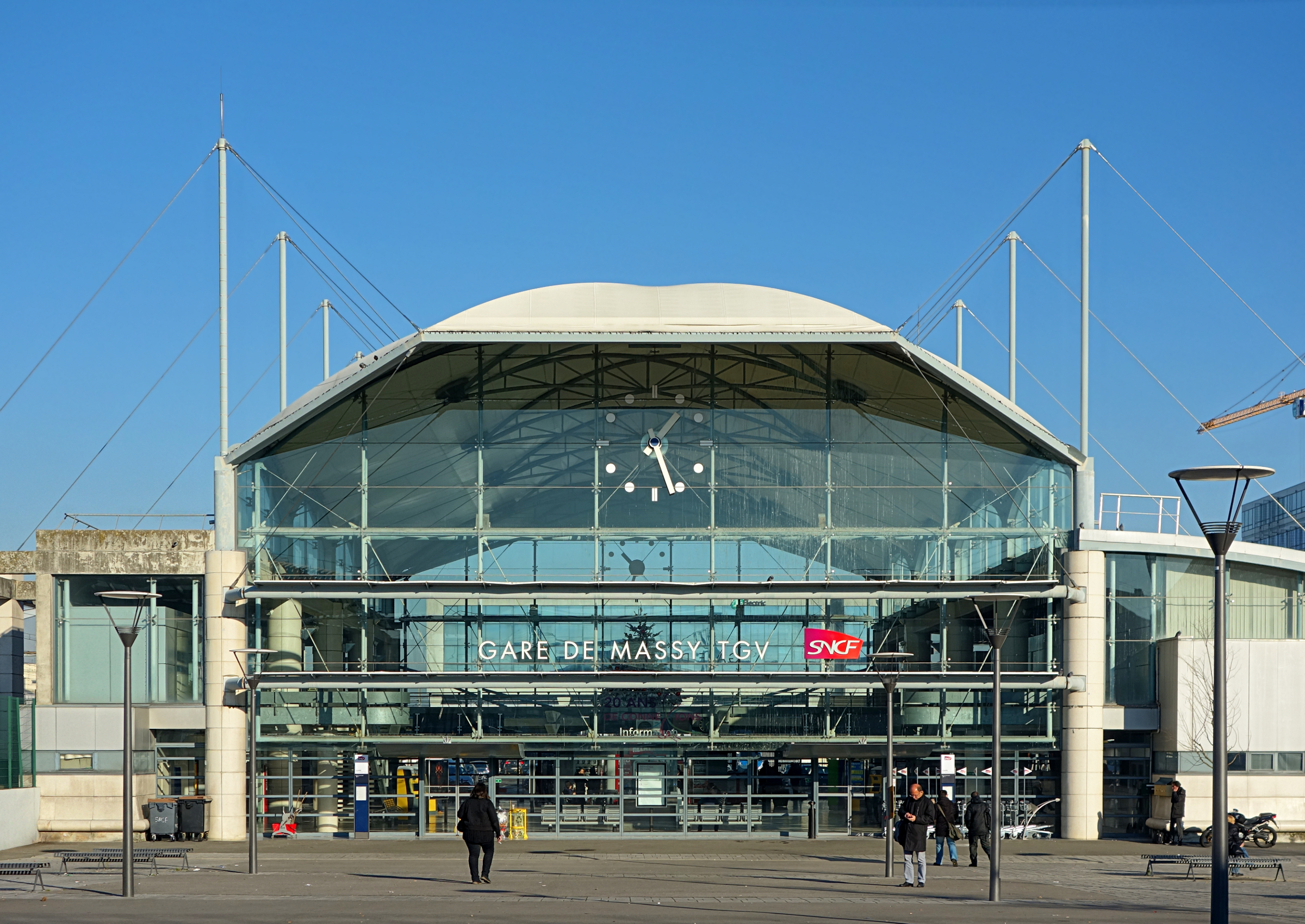
- Massy TGV station entrance

General information
- Location: 7 Avenue Carnot; Massy, Palaiseau, France
- Coordinates: 48°43′34″N 02°15′42″E
- Elevation: 78 m (256 ft)
- Owner: SNCF
- Line: LGV Atlantique
- Platforms: 2
- Tracks: 4
- Connections: at Massy–Palaiseau

Construction
- Structure type: Below-grade
- Parking: Yes
- Accessible: Yes

Other information
- Station code: 87393702

History
- Opened: 29 September 1991

Passengers
- 2024: 2,099,156

Services
Preceding station	SNCF	Following station
Montparnasse towards	TGV inOui Montparnasse–W	Le Mans towards
Montparnasse towards	TGV inOui Montparnasse–SW	Vendôme-Villiers-sur-Loir TGV towards
Marne-la-Vallée–Chessy towards	TGV inOui E–W	Le Mans towards
Marne-la-Vallée–Chessy towards	TGV inOui E–SW	Vendôme-Villiers-sur-Loir TGV towards
Le Creusot TGV towards	TGV inOui SE–W	Le Mans towards
Le Creusot TGV towards	TGV inOui SE–SW	Vendôme-Villiers-sur-Loir TGV towards
Chambéry-Challes-les-Eaux towards	TGV inOui Bourg-Saint-Maurice–Cherbourg	Versailles Chantiers towards
Preceding station	Ouigo	Following station
Paris-Montparnasse Terminus	Grande Vitesse	Le Mans towards Nantes
Paris-Montparnasse Terminus	Grande Vitesse	Laval towards Rennes
Marne-la-Vallée–Chessy towards Tourcoing	Grande Vitesse	Saint-Pierre-des-Corps towards Bordeaux
Location

Massy TGV station (French: Gare de Massy TGV) is a TGV railway station in Massy and Palaiseau, France. The station was built along the LGV Atlantique and serves as a transfer point to the regional rail system that stops at the nearby Massy–Palaiseau station.

== Services ==
The proximity of Massy–Palaiseau station (one can even consider that Massy TGV is an extension of this station) makes it possible for this station to serve a great part of south Paris and its suburbs. The station also offers the advantage of enabling Lille–Tours(–Bordeaux) and Strasbourg–Tours(–Bordeaux) trains to serve Paris via the LGV Interconnexion Est without having to turn around at a terminus station (e.g. Gare de l'Est or Gare de Lyon). However, in spite of these advantages, the traffic of this station remains low.

== History ==
On 29 September 1991, Massy TGV was inaugurated by the SNCF. It had a total cost of 160,000,000 French francs (equivalent to €24,391,843).

The station project first received the opposition of the SNCF and the local residents of Massy; the project was considered to be too close to Montparnasse station, in Paris, and a potential nuisance. The Ministry of Transport nevertheless pursued the project, as the station might avoid the suburban commuters having to travel through the capital with the RER C or B from Massy–Palaiseau.

In 2007, works were launched in order to restructure the area and the station and better integration in Massy. This involves the construction of a footbridge which would link Massy TGV, Massy–Palaiseau SNCF station, Massy–Palaiseau RATP station. The end of the works, initially programmed for 2010, has been delayed by two years.
