= Gare Montparnasse =

Terminal railway station in Paris, France

Paris Montparnasse
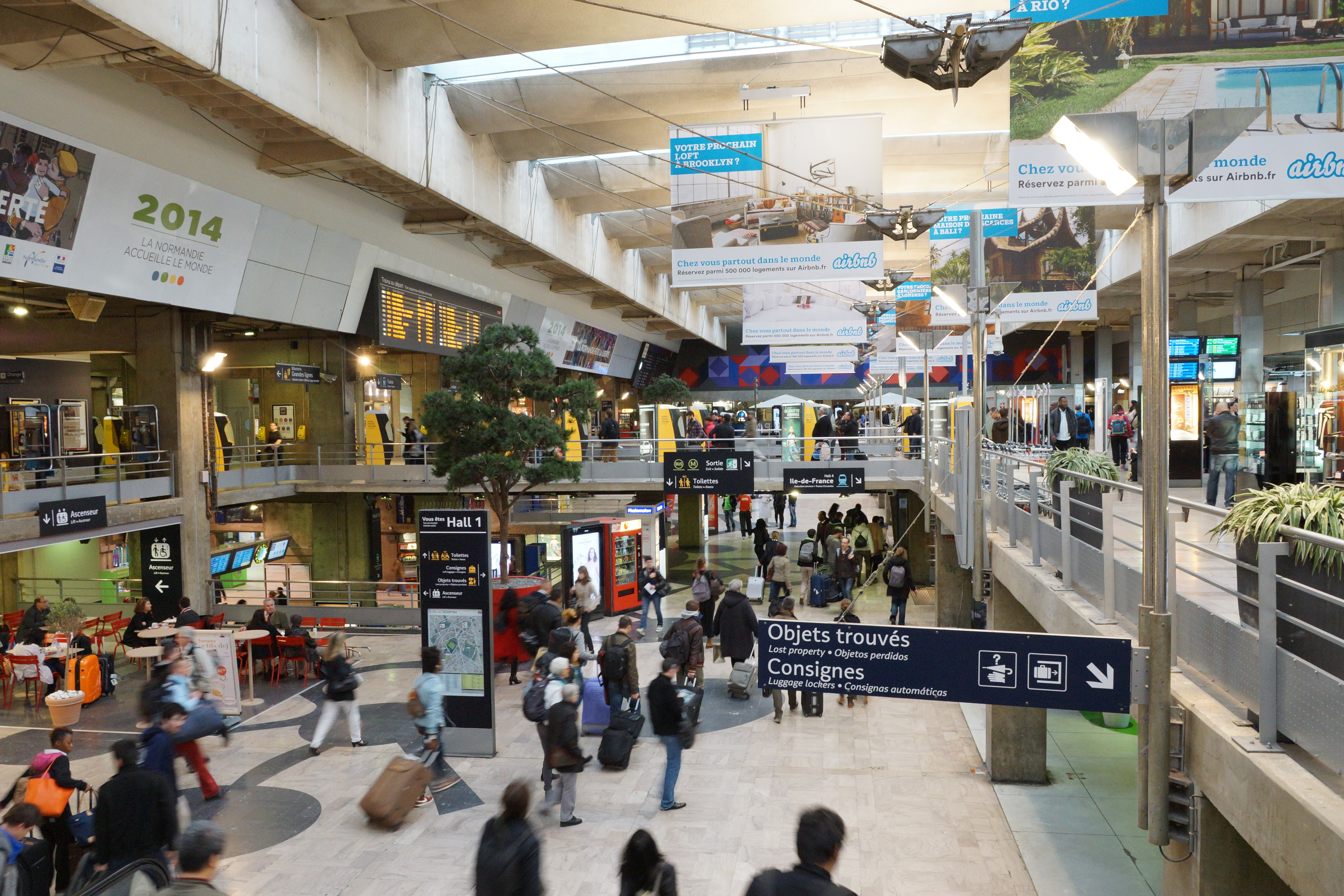
- Main station concourse

General information
- Location: Place Raoul-Dautry; Paris; France
- Coordinates: 48°50′24″N 2°19′07″E
- Elevation: 63 m (207 ft)
- Operator: SNCF
- Lines: LGV Atlantique; Paris–Brest railway; Paris–Granville railway
- Tracks: 28
- Connections: at Montparnasse–Bienvenüe; RATP Bus: 28 39 58 88 91 92 94 95 96; Noctilien: N01 N02 N12 N13 N61 N62 N63 N66 N145

Construction
- Structure type: At-grade
- Platform levels: 2
- Parking: Yes
- Cycle facilities: Parking station
- Accessible: Yes

Other information
- Station code: 87391003
- Fare zone: 1 (Public transport fares in the Île-de-France)

History
- Opened: 10 September 1840

Passengers
- 2024: 68,925,312
- Rank: 4th in France
Services
Preceding station	SNCF	Following station
Terminus	TGV	Saint-Pierre-des-Corps towards Tours
Terminus	TGV	Massy TGV towards Bordeaux
Terminus	TGV	Rennes towards Brest
Terminus	TGV	Le Mans towards Rennes
Terminus	TGV	Rennes Terminus
Terminus	TGV	Massy TGV towards Toulouse
Terminus	TGV	Vendôme-Villiers-sur-Loir TGV towards Poitiers
Terminus	TGV	Angers Saint-Laud towards Nantes
Terminus	TGV	Le Mans towards Nantes
Terminus	TGV	Niort towards La Rochelle
Terminus	TGV	Le Mans towards Saint-Malo
Terminus	TGV	Rennes towards Quimper
Preceding station	Ouigo	Following station
Terminus	Grande Vitesse	Massy TGV towards Rennes
Terminus	Grande Vitesse	Massy TGV towards Nantes
Terminus	Grande Vitesse	Saint-Pierre-des-Corps towards Bordeaux
Terminus	Grande Vitesse	Bordeaux towards Toulouse
Preceding station	Transilien	Following station
Terminus	Line N	Vanves–Malakoff towards Dreux, Mantes-la-Jolie or Rambouillet
Preceding station	Le Réseau Rémi	Following station
Versailles-Chantiers towards Le Mans	3.2	Terminus
Preceding station	TER Normandie	Following station
Terminus	Krono	Versailles-Chantiers towards Granville
Connections to other stations
Preceding station	Paris Metro	Following station
Vavin towards Bagneux–Lucie Aubrac	Line 4 transfer at Montparnasse–Bienvenüe	Saint-Placide towards Porte de Clignancourt
Pasteur towards Charles de Gaulle–Étoile	Line 6 transfer at Montparnasse–Bienvenüe	Edgar Quinet towards Nation
Falguière towards Mairie d'Issy	Line 12 transfer at Montparnasse–Bienvenüe	Notre-Dame-des-Champs towards Mairie d'Aubervilliers
Gaîté towards Châtillon–Montrouge	Line 13 transfer at Montparnasse–Bienvenüe	Duroc towards Les Courtilles or Saint-Denis–Université
Location

Gare Montparnasse (French pronunciation: [ɡaʁ mɔ̃paʁnas]; Montparnasse station), officially Paris Montparnasse and formerly Gare de l'Ouest, is one of the seven large Paris railway termini, and is located in the 14th and 15th arrondissements.

The station opened in 1840, was rebuilt in 1852 and relocated in 1969 to a new station just south of the original location, where subsequently the prominent Tour Montparnasse was constructed. It is a central element to the Montparnasse area. The original station is noted for the Montparnasse derailment, where a steam train crashed through the station in 1895, an event captured in widely known photographs and reproduced in full scale in several locations.

The station serves intercity TGV trains to the west and southwest of France including Tours, Bordeaux, Rennes and Nantes, and suburban and regional services on the Transilien Line N routes. There is also a metro station. Gare Montparnasse is the only mainline terminus in Paris not directly connected to the RER system, though the Montparnasse main line is connected to the RER at Versailles Chantiers and the LGV Atlantique at Massy–Palaiseau.

== History ==
The station opened in 1840 as Gare de l'Ouest, later being renamed. A second station was built between 1848 and 1852.

On 25 August 1944, the German military governor of Paris, General von Choltitz, surrendered his garrison to the French General Philippe Leclerc at the old station. (see Liberation of Paris).

During the 1960s, a newer station integrated into a complex of office buildings was built further down the track. In 1969, the old station was demolished and the Tour Montparnasse built on its site. An extension was built in 1990 to host the TGV Atlantique.

== 1895 derailment ==
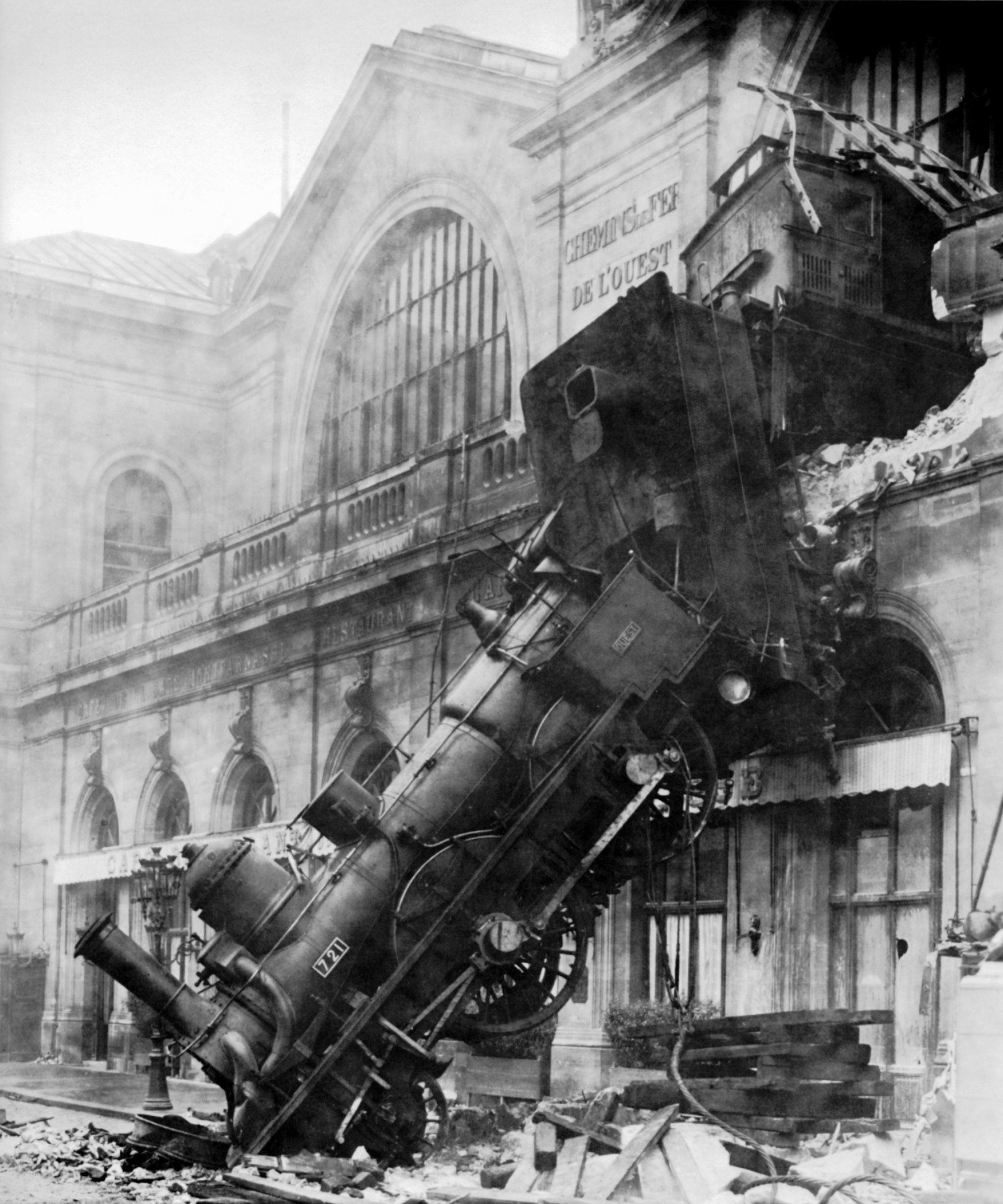
Granville–Paris Express wreck on 22 October 1895.

The Gare Montparnasse became famous for the derailment on 22 October 1895 of the Granville–Paris Express, which overran the buffer stop. The engine careened across almost 30 metres (100 ft) of the station concourse, crashed through a 60-centimetre (2 ft) thick wall, shot across a terrace and smashed out of the station, plummeting onto the Place de Rennes 10 metres (33 ft) below, where it stood on its nose. Two of the 131 passengers sustained injuries, along with the fireman and two conductors. The only fatality was a woman on the street below, Marie-Augustine Aguilard, who was temporarily taking over her husband's work duty while he went out to get the newspapers. She was killed by falling masonry. The railway company later paid for her funeral and provided a pension to look after her two children. The accident was caused by a faulty Westinghouse brake and the engine driver, who was trying to make up lost time. A conductor was given a 25-franc fine and the engine driver a 50-franc fine.

Replicas of the train crash are recreated outside the Mundo a Vapor ("Steam World") museum chain buildings in Canela, Brazil.

== Train services ==
From Paris Montparnasse train services depart to major French cities such as: Le Mans, Rennes, Saint-Brieuc, Brest, Saint-Malo, Vannes, Lorient, Quimper, Angers, Nantes, Saint-Nazaire, Tours, Poitiers, La Rochelle, Angoulême, Bordeaux, Toulouse, Bayonne and Granville. The station is also served by suburban trains heading to the west and south-west of Paris.

- High speed services (TGV) Paris – Bordeaux – Dax – Lourdes – Tarbes
- High speed services (TGV) Paris – Bordeaux – Dax – Bayonne – Biarritz – Hendaye
- High speed services (TGV) Paris – Bordeaux – Agen – Toulouse
- High speed services (TGV) Paris – Bordeaux – Arcachon
- High speed services (TGV) Paris – Tours – Poitiers – Angoulême – Bordeaux
- High speed services (TGV) Paris – Poitiers – La Rochelle
- High speed services (TGV) Paris – Tours
- High speed services (TGV) Paris – Le Mans – Rennes – St Brieuc – Brest
- High speed services (TGV) Paris – Le Mans – Vannes – Lorient – Quimper
- High speed services (TGV) Paris – Rennes – St Malo
- High speed services (TGV) Paris – Le Mans – Rennes
- High speed services (TGV) Paris – Nantes – St-Nazaire – Le Croisic
- High speed services (TGV) Paris – Le Mans – Angers – Nantes
- Discount High Speed Services (Ouigo TGV) Paris (Vaugirard.Montparnesse Hall 3) - Poitiers - Saint-Pierre-des-Corps- Angoulême - Bordeaux
- Discount High Speed Services (Ouigo TGV) Paris (Vaugirard.Montparnesse Hall 3) - Le Mans - Laval - Rennes
- Regional Services (TER Normandie) Paris (Vaugirard.Montparnesse Hall 3) to Granville with numerous stops
- Regional services (TER Centre) Paris – Versailles – Rambouillet – Chartres – Le Mans
- Regional services (Transilien) Paris – Versailles – St-Quentin-en-Yvelines – Rambouillet
- Regional services (Transilien) Paris – Versailles – Plaisir – Dreux
- Regional services (Transilien) Paris – Versailles – Plaisir – Mantes-la-Jolie
- Regional services (Transilien) Paris – Versailles – Plaisir
Map

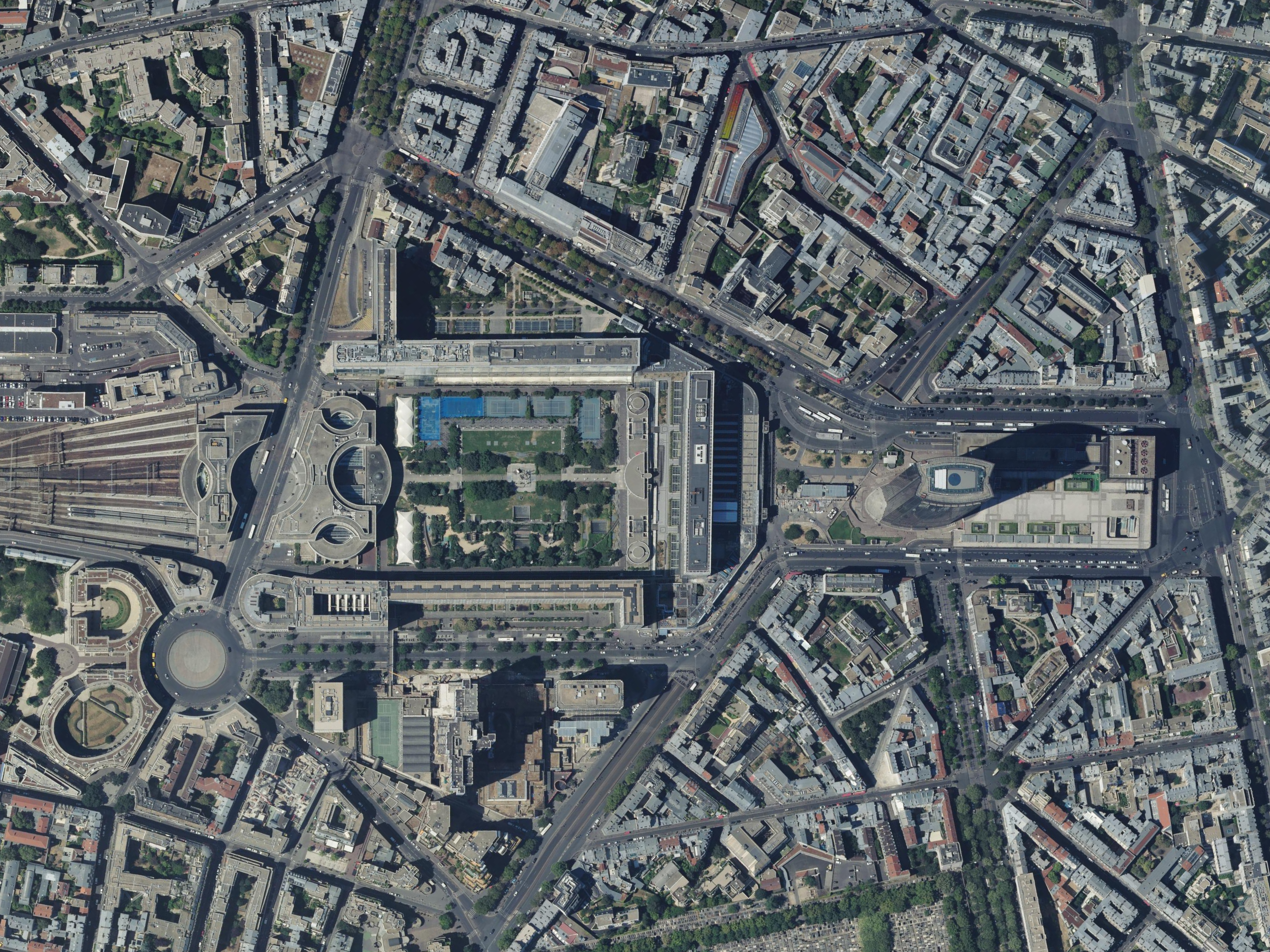
Aerial view

== Lines serving this station ==
Adjacent metro station:

- Montparnasse – Bienvenüe

Nearby station:

- Pasteur
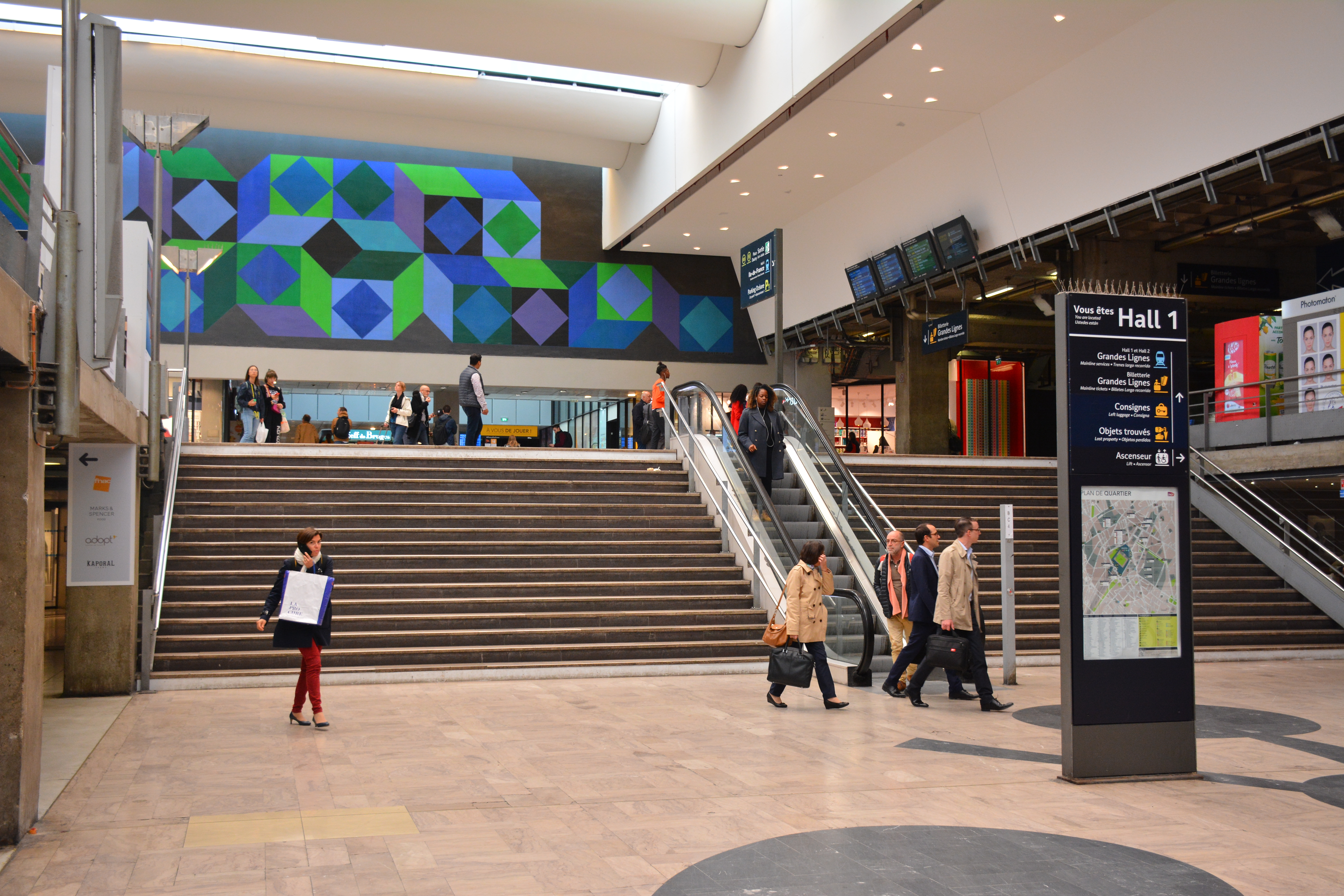
Concourse of the station

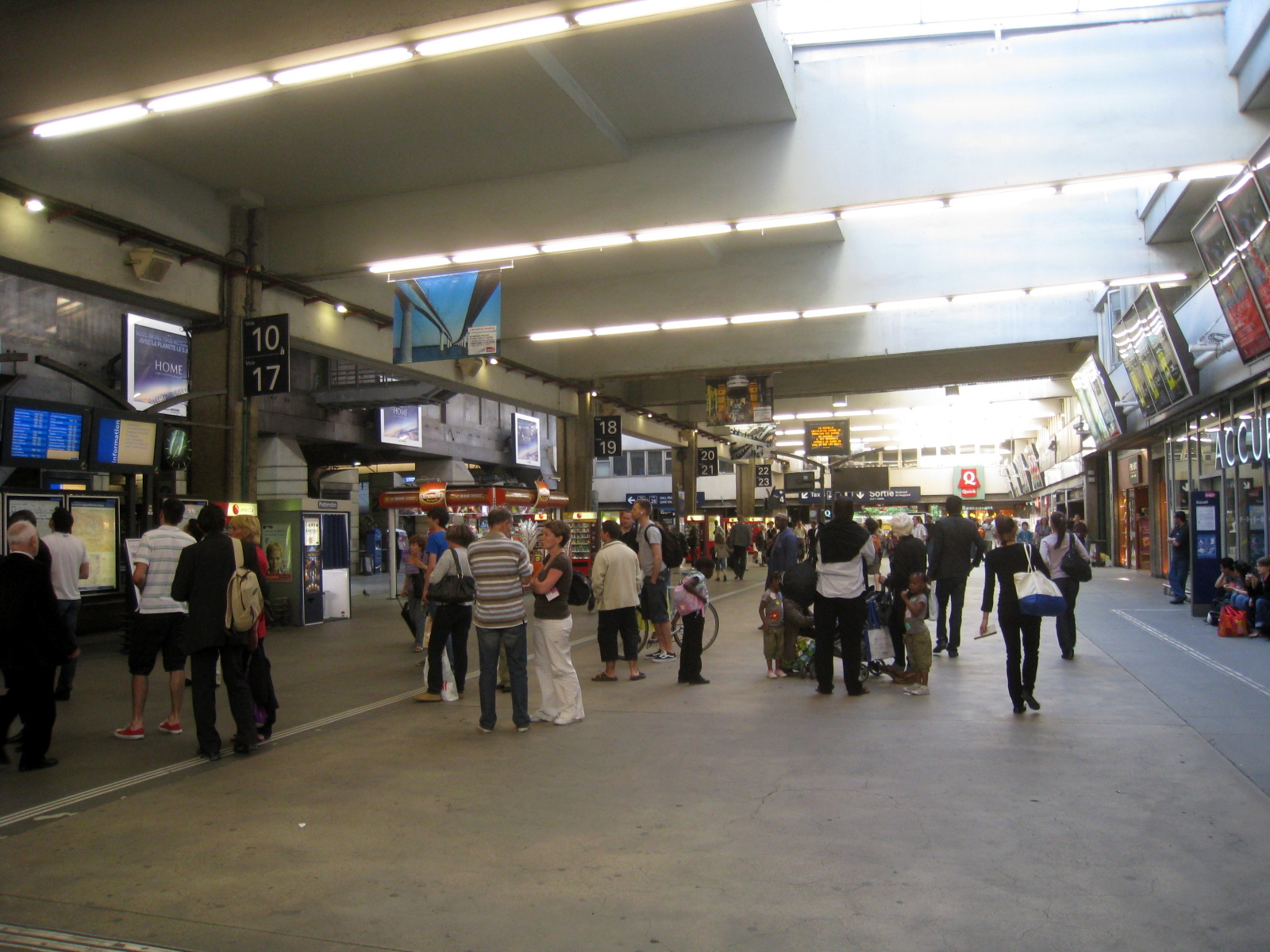
Platform of the station

== See also ==
- List of Paris railway stations
- Transportation in France
- List of stations of the Paris RER
- List of stations of the Paris Métro
- Gare d'Austerlitz
- Gare de l'Est
- Gare de Lyon
- Gare du Nord
- Gare Saint-Lazare
- Georges Méliès, who worked at the station later in his life.
