= Rennes station =

Railway station in Rennes, France

Rennes Roazhon
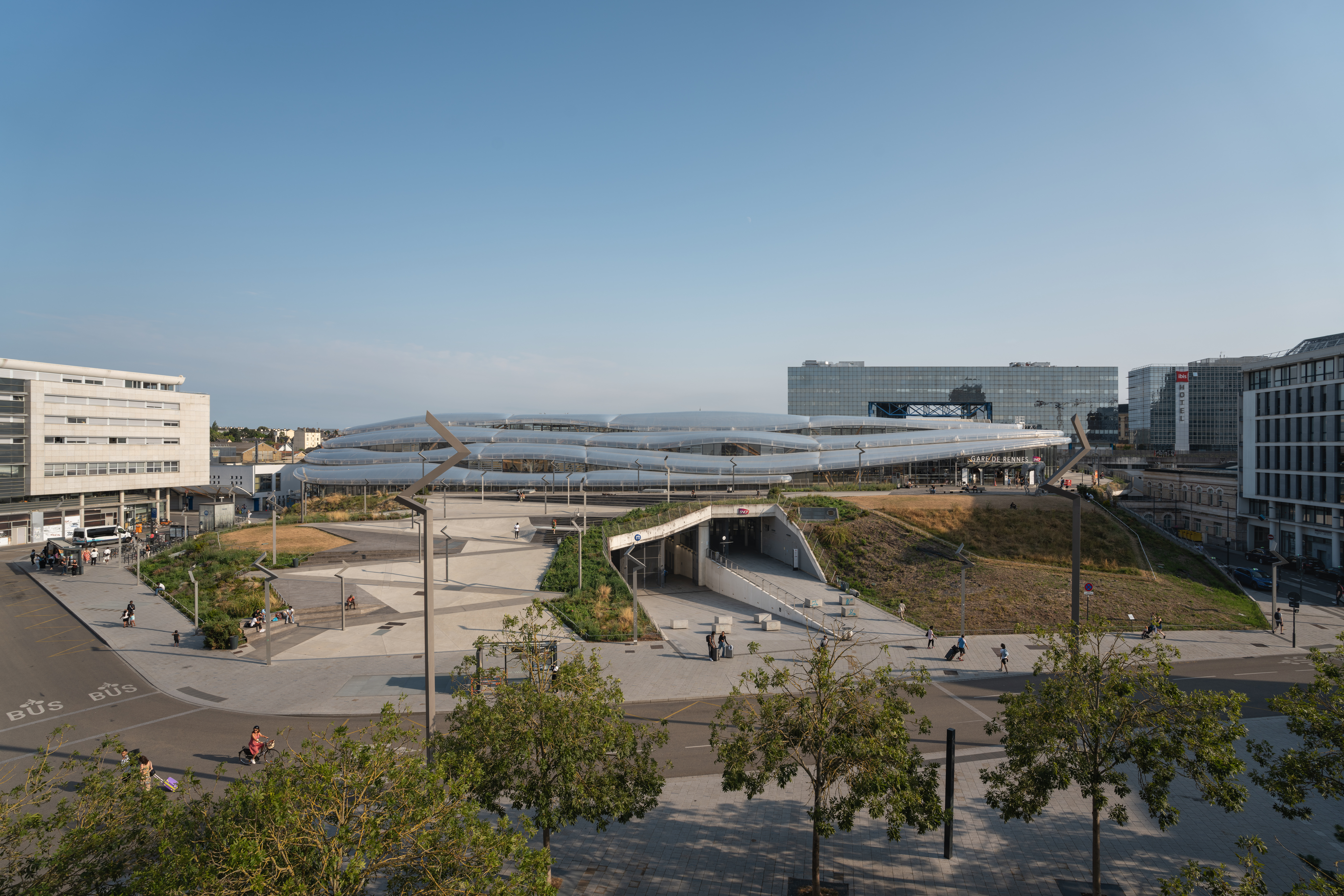
- New railway station square in 2024

General information
- Location: Place de la Gare, 35000 Rennes, France
- Coordinates: 48°06′12″N 1°40′21″W
- Owner: RFF / SNCF
- Lines: Paris–Brest railway Rennes–Redon railway Rennes–Saint-Malo railway Rennes–Châteaubriant railway
- Platforms: 5 central
- Tracks: 10

Construction
- Platform levels: 31 metres (102 ft)
- Parking: 2

Other information
- Station code: 87471003
- IATA code: ZFJ
- Fare zone: Unipass zone 1

History
- Opened: 1857

Passengers
- 2024: 15,689,647
Services
Preceding station	SNCF	Following station
Lamballe towards Brest	TGV	Vitré towards Montparnasse
Lamballe towards Lannion	TGV	Vitré towards Montparnasse
Redon towards Quimper	TGV	Vitré towards Montparnasse
Dol-de-Bretagne towards Saint-Malo	TGV	Vitré towards Montparnasse
Preceding station	TER Bretagne	Following station
Lamballe towards Brest	1	Vitré towards Montparnasse
Messac-Guipry towards Quimper	2	Vitré towards Montparnasse
Terminus	9	Rennes-La Poterie towards Châteaubriant
Rennes-Pontchaillou towards Saint-Malo	13	Terminus
Saint-Jacques-de-la-Lande towards Vannes	15	Terminus
L'Hermitage-Mordelles towards Saint-Brieuc	16	Terminus
Preceding station	TER Normandie	Following station
Dol-de-Bretagne towards Granville	Citi	Terminus
Preceding station	TER Pays de la Loire	Following station
Terminus	2	Nantes Terminus
Terminus	27	Cesson-Sévigné towards Laval
Vitré towards Nantes	28	Terminus
Preceding station	Ouigo	Following station
Laval towards Paris-Montparnasse	Grande Vitesse	Terminus
Location
- Location within France Location within Brittany

Rennes station (French: Gare de Rennes; Breton: Ti-gar Roazhon) is situated in the town centre of Rennes, France. It is situated on the Paris–Brest, Rennes–Saint-Malo and the Rennes–Redon railways.

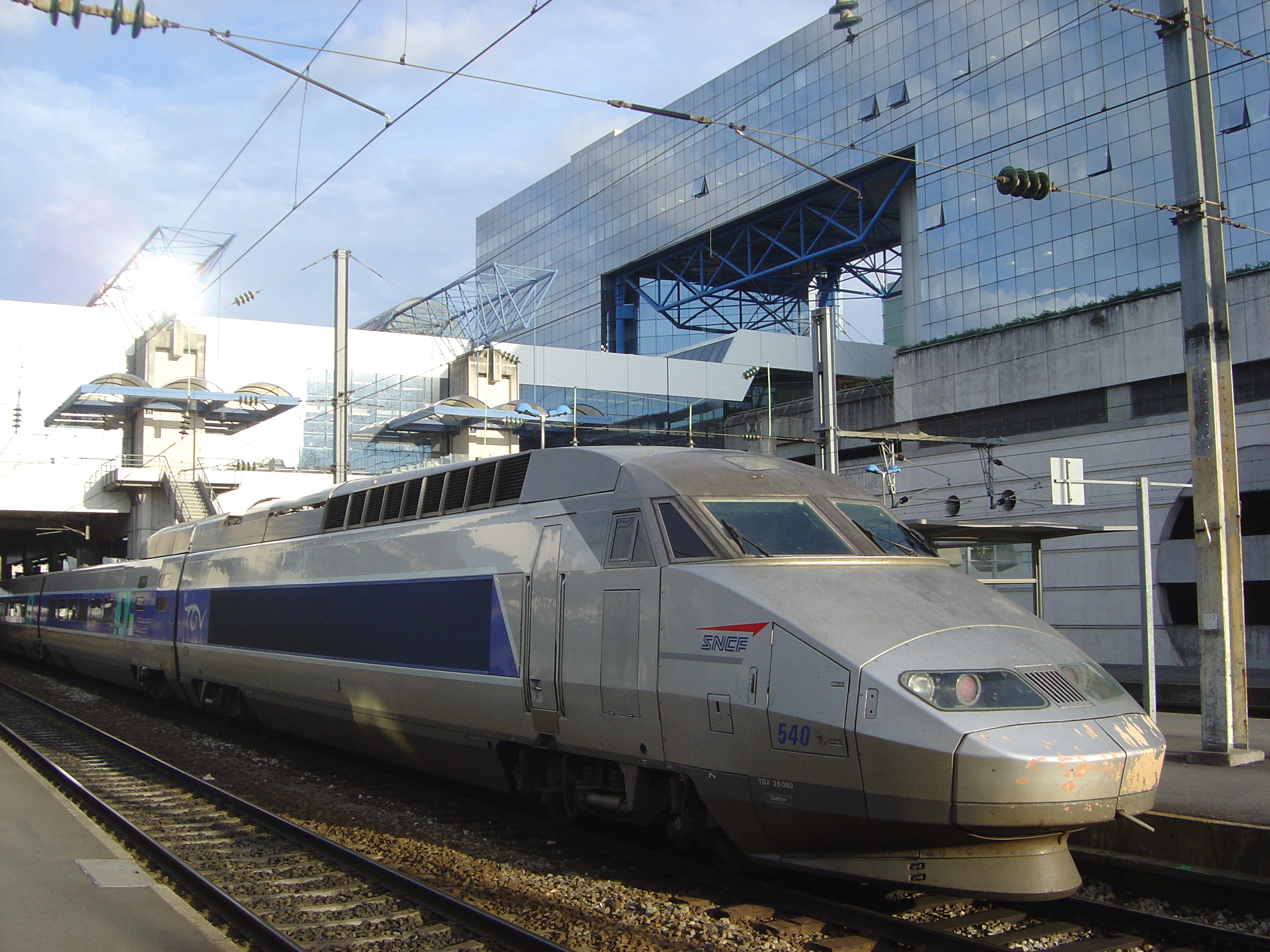
TGV train in Rennes Rail Station

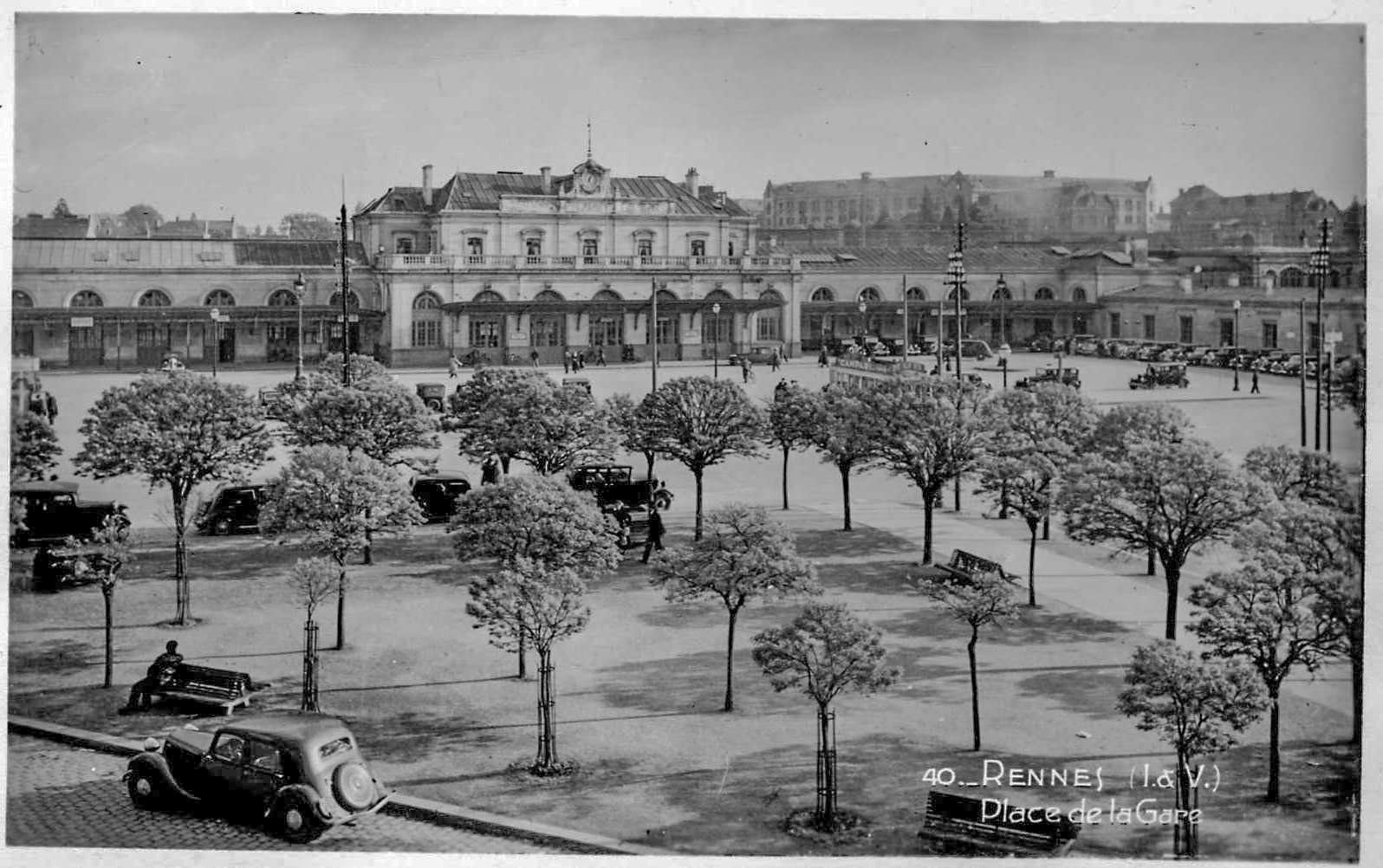
Rennes Station, early 20th Century

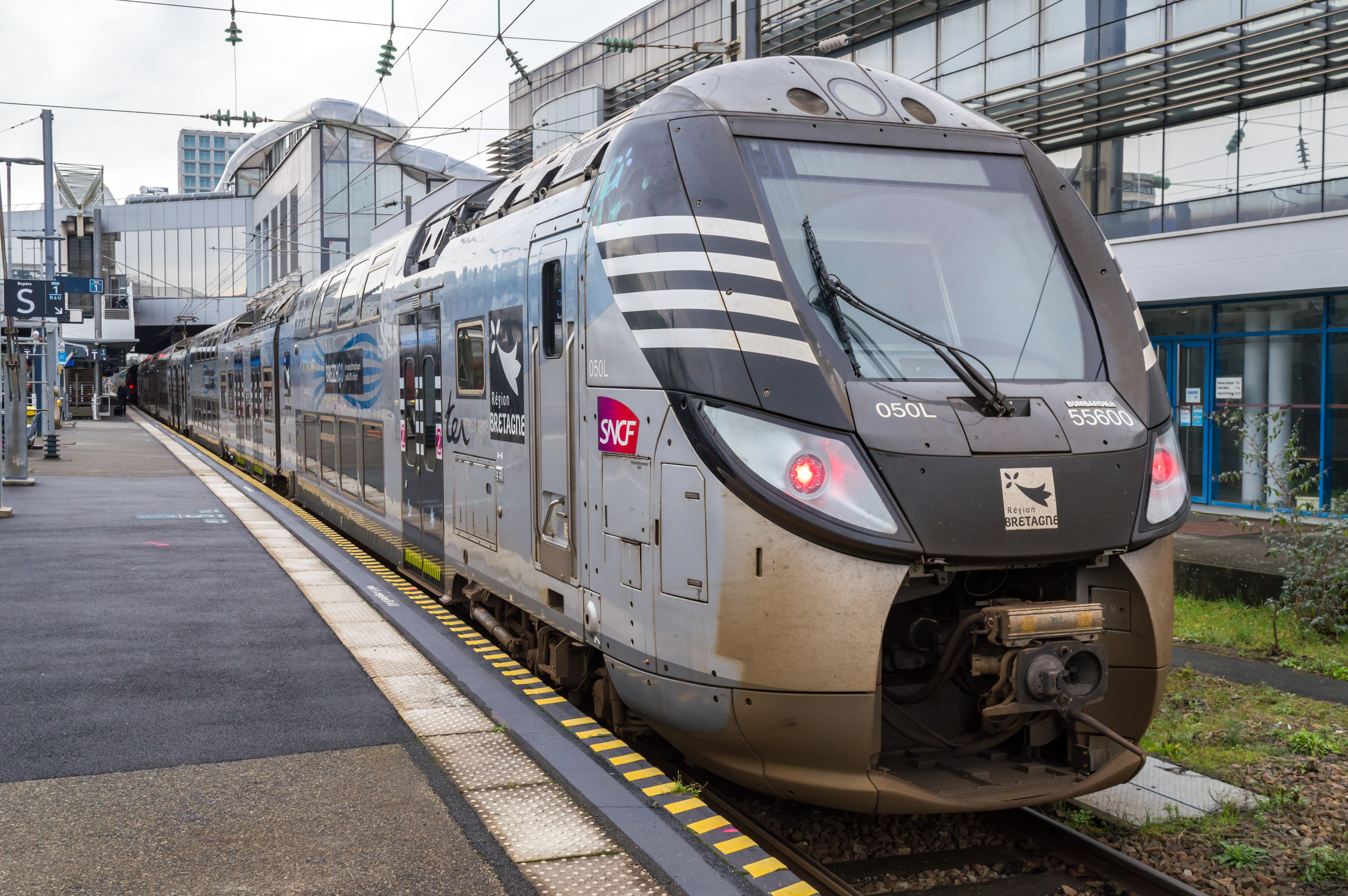
Regional TER Bretagne train in Rennes

The station at Rennes was opened in 1857 and was situated a significant walking distance from the city centre. However, since that date the town has expanded and now the station lies in the central part of the city. It has access to Paris on the TGV, a two-hour trip; and serves Brittany with regular trains to Brest, Lannion, Nantes, Quimper and Saint-Malo. Train service is available to other cities in France such as Lyon, Montpellier, Marseille, Lille, Aix-en-Provence and Strasbourg. The station also has a direct train service to Brussels-South railway station once every day.

It is served by the Gares station of both lines of the Rennes Metro.

== Train Services ==
The station is served by high-speed trains to Quimper, Brest and Paris, and regional trains to Quimper, Lorient, Nantes, Laval, Saint-Malo, Saint-Brieuc and Granville.

== Public Transport Services ==
The station is served by Lines A and B of the Rennes Metro. It is also served by several bus lines: C1, C2, 11, 12, and 63.

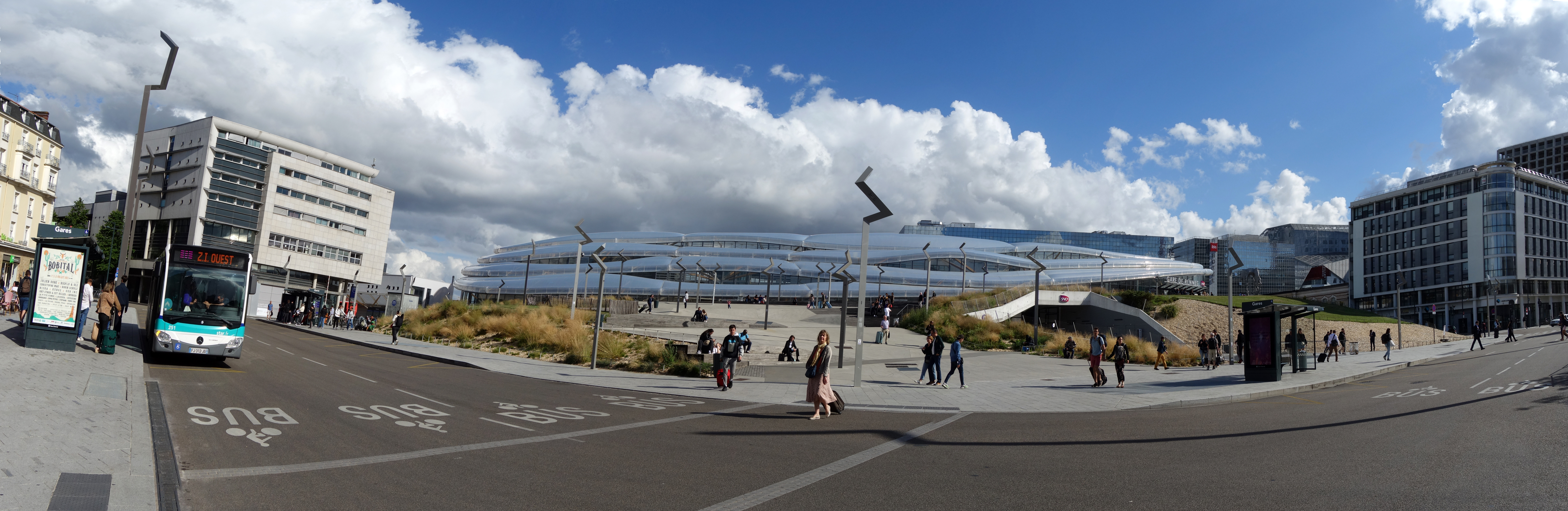
Panoramic view of the forecourt of Rennes SNCF train station from the north, from Avenue Janvier

== See also ==
- Transportation in France
