= List of SNCF stations in Pays de la Loire =

This article contains a list of current SNCF railway stations in the Pays de la Loire region of France.

== Loire-Atlantique (44) ==
- Abbaretz
- Ancenis
- Babinière
- Basse-Indre-Saint-Herblain
- Batz-sur-Mer
- La Baule-Escoublac
- La Baule-les-Pins
- La Bernerie-en-Retz
- Beslé
- Bouaye
- Bourgneuf-en-Retz
- Boussay-La Bruffière
- Le Cellier
- Chantenay
- La Chapelle-Aulnay
- La Chapelle-Centre
- Châteaubriant
- Clisson
- Cordemais
- Couëron
- Le Croisic
- La Croix-de-Méan
- Donges
- Drefféac
- Erdre-Active
- Gorges
- La Haie-Fouassière
- Haluchère-Batignolles
- Issé
- Machecoul
- Massérac
- Mauves-sur-Loire
- Montoir-de-Bretagne
- Les Moutiers-en-Retz
- Nantes
- Nort-sur-Erdre
- Oudon
- Le Pallet
- Penhoët
- Pontchâteau
- Pornic
- Pornichet
- Port-Saint-Père-Saint-Mars
- Le Pouliguen
- Rezé-Pont-Rousseau
- Sainte-Pazanne
- Saint-Étienne-de-Montluc
- Saint-Gildas-des-Bois
- Saint-Hilaire-de-Chaléons
- Saint-Nazaire
- Saint-Sébastien-Frêne-Rond
- Saint-Sébastien-Pas-Enchantés
- Savenay
- Sévérac
- Sucé-sur-Erdre
- Thouaré
- Varades-Saint-Florent-le-Vieil
- Vertou

== Maine-et-Loire (49) ==
- Angers-Maître-École
- Angers-Saint-Laud
- La Bohalle
- Chalonnes
- Champtocé-sur-Loire
- Chemillé
- Cholet
- Écouflant
- Étriché-Châteauneuf
- Ingrandes-sur-Loire
- La Ménitré
- Montreuil-Bellay
- Morannes
- La Possonnière
- Les Rosiers-sur-Loire
- Saint-Mathurin
- Saumur
- Savennières-Béhuard
- Tiercé
- Torfou
- Trélazé
- Le Vieux-Briollay

== Mayenne (53) ==
- Évron
- Le Genest
- Laval
- Louverné
- Montsûrs
- Neau
- Port-Brillet
- Saint-Pierre-la-Cour
- Voutré

== Sarthe (72) ==
- Arnage
- Aubigné-Racan
- Champagné
- Château-du-Loir
- Conlie
- Connerré-Beillé
- Crissé
- Domfont
- Écommoy
- La Ferté-Bernard
- La Guierche
- La Hutte-Coulombiers
- Laigneé-Saint-Gervais
- Le Mans
- Mayet
- Montbizot
- Montfort-le-Gesnois
- Neuvile-sur-Sarthe
- Noyen
- Rouessé-Vassé
- Sablé-sur-Sarthe
- Saint-Mars-la-Brière
- Sceaux-Boëssé
- Sillé-le-Guillaume
- La Suze
- Teillé
- Vaas
- Vivoin-Beaumont
- Voivres

== Vendée (85) ==
- Belleville-sur-Vie
- Bournezeau
- La Chaize-le-Vicomte
- Challans
- Chantonnay
- Cugand
- Fougeré
- L'Herbergement-Les Brouzils
- Luçon
- Montaigu
- La Mothe-Achard
- Olonne-sur-Mer
- Pouzauges
- La Roche-sur-Yon
- Les Sables-d'Olonne
- Saint-Gilles-Croix-de-Vie
- Saint-Hilaire-de-Riez

== See also ==
- SNCF
- List of SNCF stations for SNCF stations in other regions
