= Saint-Hilaire-de-Chaléons station =

Railway station in Saint-Hilaire-de-Chaléons, France

Saint-Hilaire-de-Chaléons
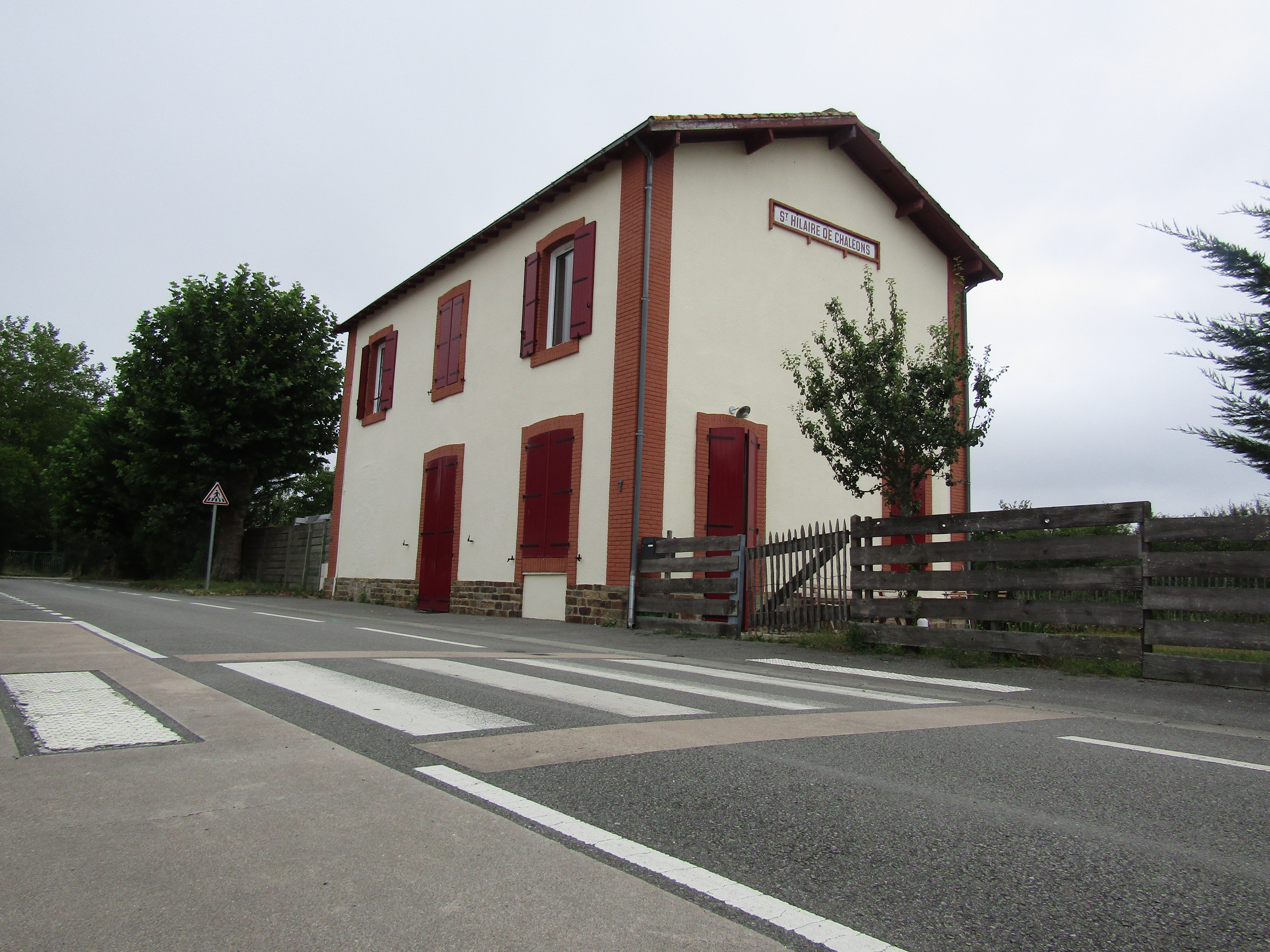
- Saint-Hilaire-de-Chaléons railway station

General information
- Location: Saint-Hilaire-de-Chaléons, Loire-Atlantique; Pays de la Loire, France
- Coordinates: 47°06′19″N 1°51′52″W
- Line: Sainte-Pazanne–Pornic railway
- Platforms: 1
- Tracks: 1

Other information
- Station code: 87481234

History
- Opened: 11 September 1875

Services
Preceding station	TER Pays de la Loire	Following station
Sainte-Pazanne towards Nantes	10	Bourgneuf-en-Retz towards Pornic
Location

Saint-Hilaire-de-Chaléons is a railway station in Saint-Hilaire-de-Chaléons, Pays de la Loire, France. The station is located on the Sainte-Pazanne–Pornic railway. The station is served by TER (local) services operated by the SNCF:

- local services (TER Pays de la Loire) Nantes - Sainte-Pazanne - Pornic
