= Machecoul station =

Railway station in Machecoul, France

Machecoul
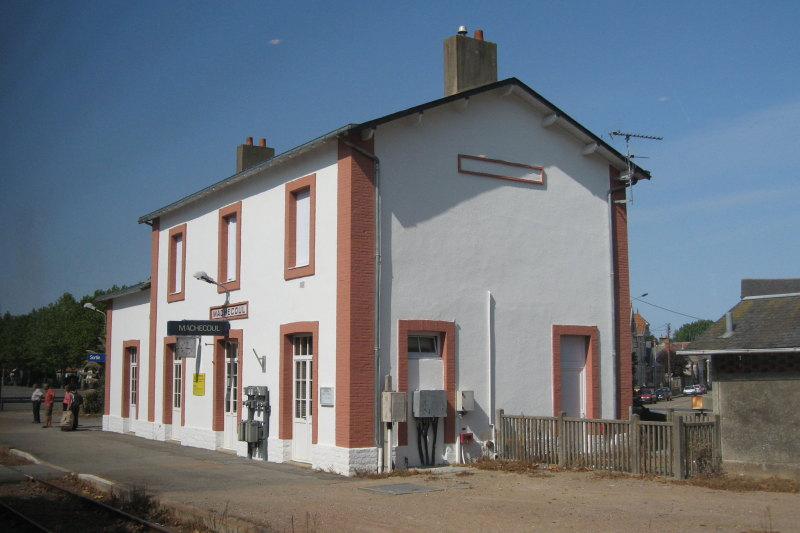
- Machecoul railway station

General information
- Location: Machecoul, Loire-Atlantique; Pays de la Loire, France
- Coordinates: 46°59′24″N 1°49′21″W
- Line: Nantes–La Roche (via Sainte-Pazanne)
- Platforms: 2
- Tracks: 2

Other information
- Station code: 87481366

History
- Opened: 25 March 1876

Services
| Preceding station | TER Pays de la Loire | Following station |
|---|---|---|
| Sainte-Pazanne towards Nantes | 11 | Challans towards Saint-Gilles-Croix-de-Vie |
Location

Machecoul is a railway station in Machecoul, Pays de la Loire, France. The station is located on the Nantes–La Roche-sur-Yon via Sainte-Pazanne railway. The station is served by TER (local) services operated by the SNCF:

- local services (TER Pays de la Loire) Nantes - Sainte-Pazanne - Saint-Gilles-Croix-de-Vie
