= Bourgneuf-en-Retz station =

Railway station in Bourgneuf-en-Retz, France

Bourgneuf-en-Retz
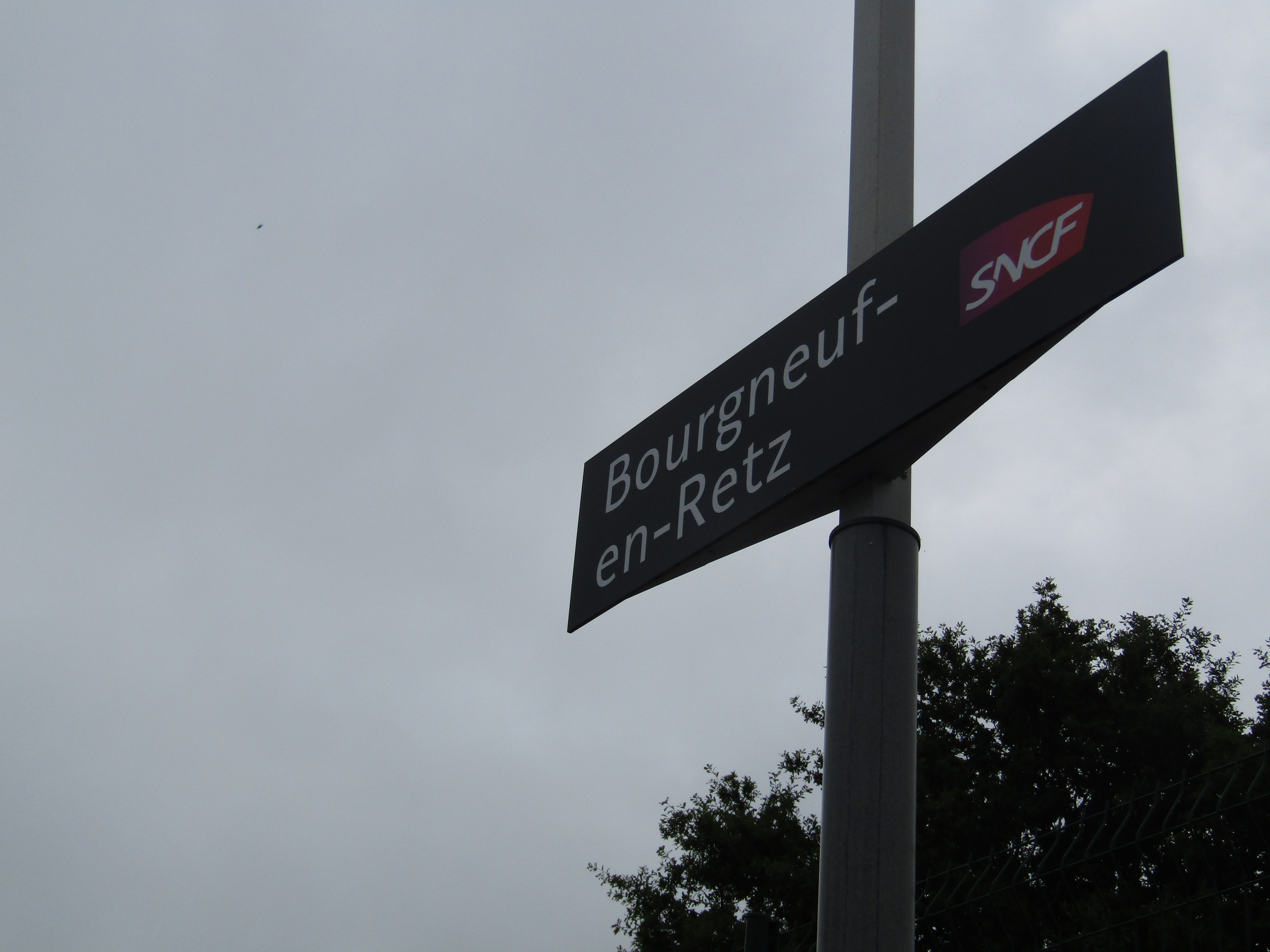
- Bourgneuf-en-Retz railway station

General information
- Location: Bourgneuf-en-Retz, Loire-Atlantique; Pays de la Loire, France
- Coordinates: 47°02′49″N 1°57′11″W
- Line: Sainte-Pazanne–Pornic railway
- Platforms: 1
- Tracks: 1

Other information
- Station code: 87481242

Services
Preceding station	TER Pays de la Loire	Following station
Saint-Hilaire-de-Chaléons towards Nantes	10	Les Moutiers-en-Retz towards Pornic
Location

Bourgneuf-en-Retz is a railway station in Bourgneuf-en-Retz, Pays de la Loire, France. The station is located on the Sainte-Pazanne–Pornic railway. The station is served by TER (local) services operated by the SNCF:

- local services (TER Pays de la Loire) Nantes - Sainte-Pazanne - Pornic
