= La Haie-Fouassière station =

Railway station in La Haie-Fouassière, France

La Haie-Fouassière
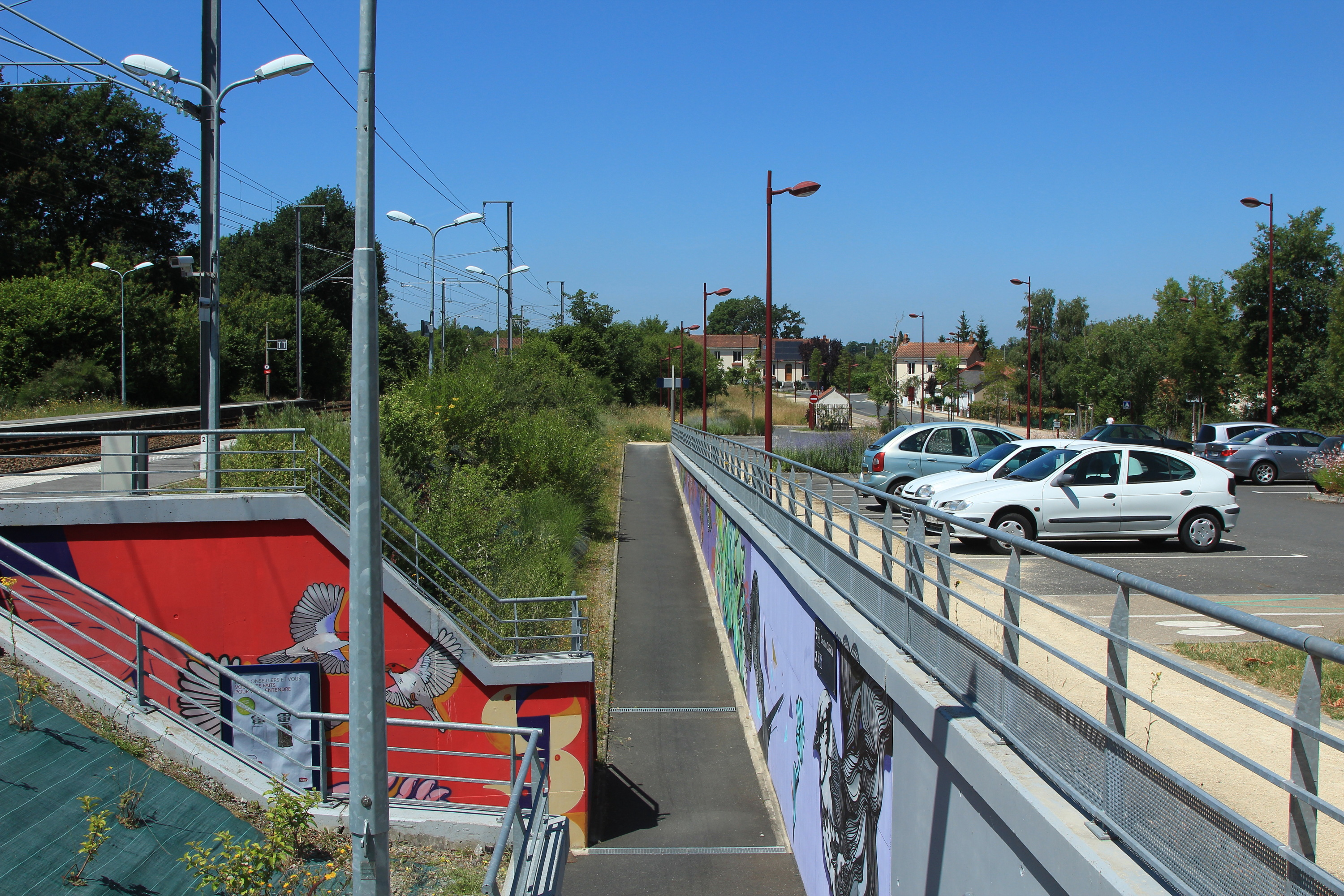
- La Haie-Fouassière railway station

General information
- Location: La Haie-Fouassière, Loire-Atlantique; Pays de la Loire, France
- Coordinates: 47°09′41″N 1°23′31″W
- Line: Nantes–Saintes railway
- Platforms: 2
- Tracks: 2

Other information
- Station code: 87481416

Services
Preceding station	TER Pays de la Loire	Following station
Vertou towards Nantes	T2	Le Pallet towards Clisson
Location

La Haie-Fouassière is a railway station in La Haie-Fouassière, Pays de la Loire, France. The station is located on the Nantes-Saintes railway. Since 15 June 2011 the station is served by a tram-train service between Nantes and Clisson operated by the SNCF. The following services call at La Haie-Fouassière as of 2022:

- local service (TER Pays de la Loire) Nantes - Clisson
