= Challans station =

Railway station in Challans, France

Challans
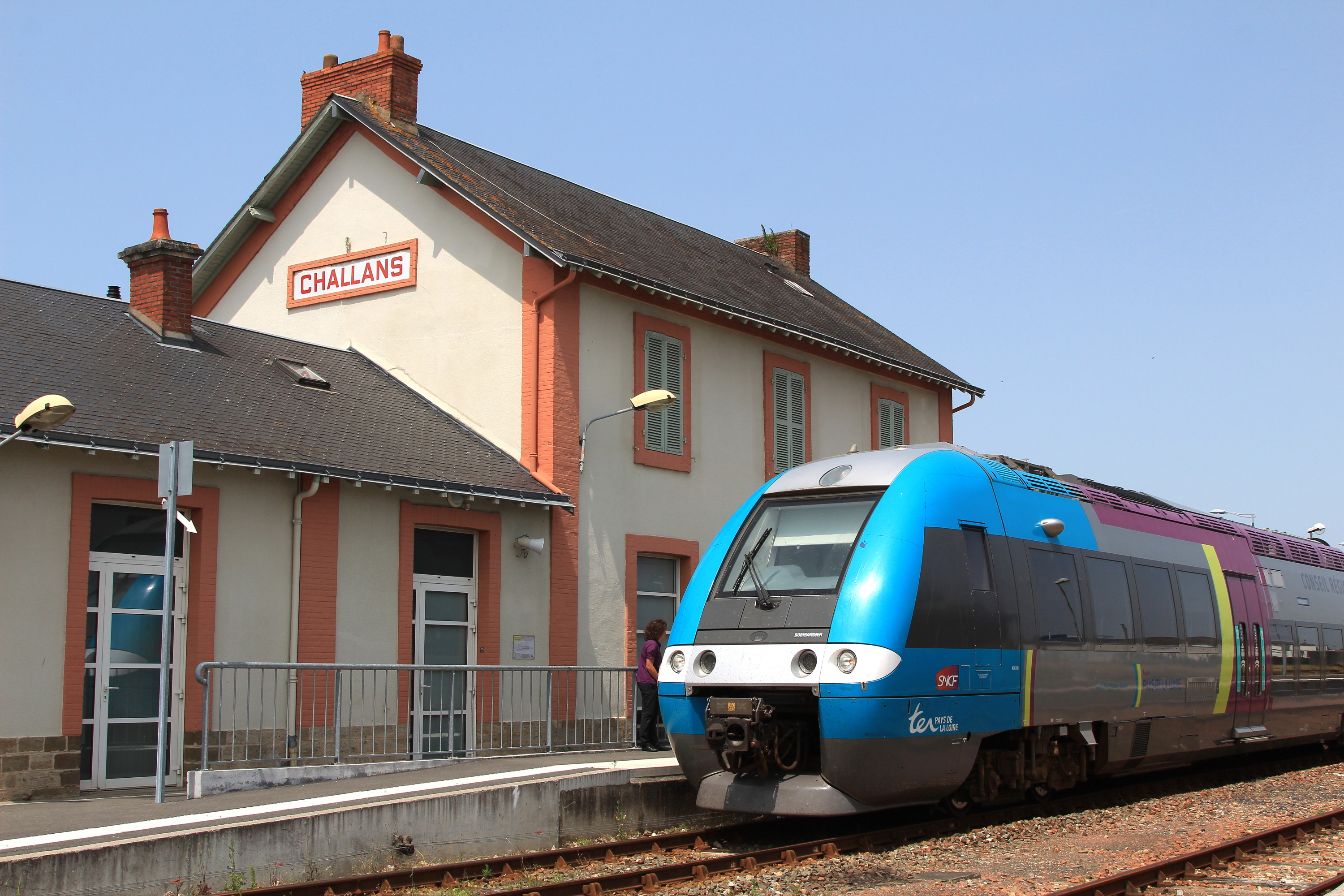
- Challans railway station

General information
- Location: Challans, Vendée; Pays de la Loire, France
- Coordinates: 46°50′36″N 1°52′19″W
- Line: Nantes–La Roche-sur-Yon via Sainte-Pazanne
- Platforms: 3
- Tracks: 3

Other information
- Station code: 87481390

History
- Opened: 30 December 1878

Services
Preceding station	TER Pays de la Loire	Following station
Machecoul towards Nantes	11	Saint-Hilaire-de-Riez towards Saint-Gilles-Croix-de-Vie
Location

Challans is a railway station in Challans, Pays de la Loire, France. The station is located on the Nantes–La Roche-sur-Yon via Sainte-Pazanne railway. The station is served by TER (local) services operated by the SNCF:

- local services (TER Pays de la Loire) Nantes - Sainte-Pazanne - Saint-Gilles-Croix-de-Vie
