= Vitré station =

Railway station in France

Coordinates: 48°07′21″N 1°12′42″W

Vitré station (French: Gare de Vitré) is a railway station serving the town Vitré, Ille-et-Vilaine department, western France. It is situated on the Paris–Brest railway. The station is listed as "historical monument" since 1975.

In 1985, the clip of the music Another Brick from Fake (Swedish band), was also a big success internationally, was filmed on the railway and station of Vitré.

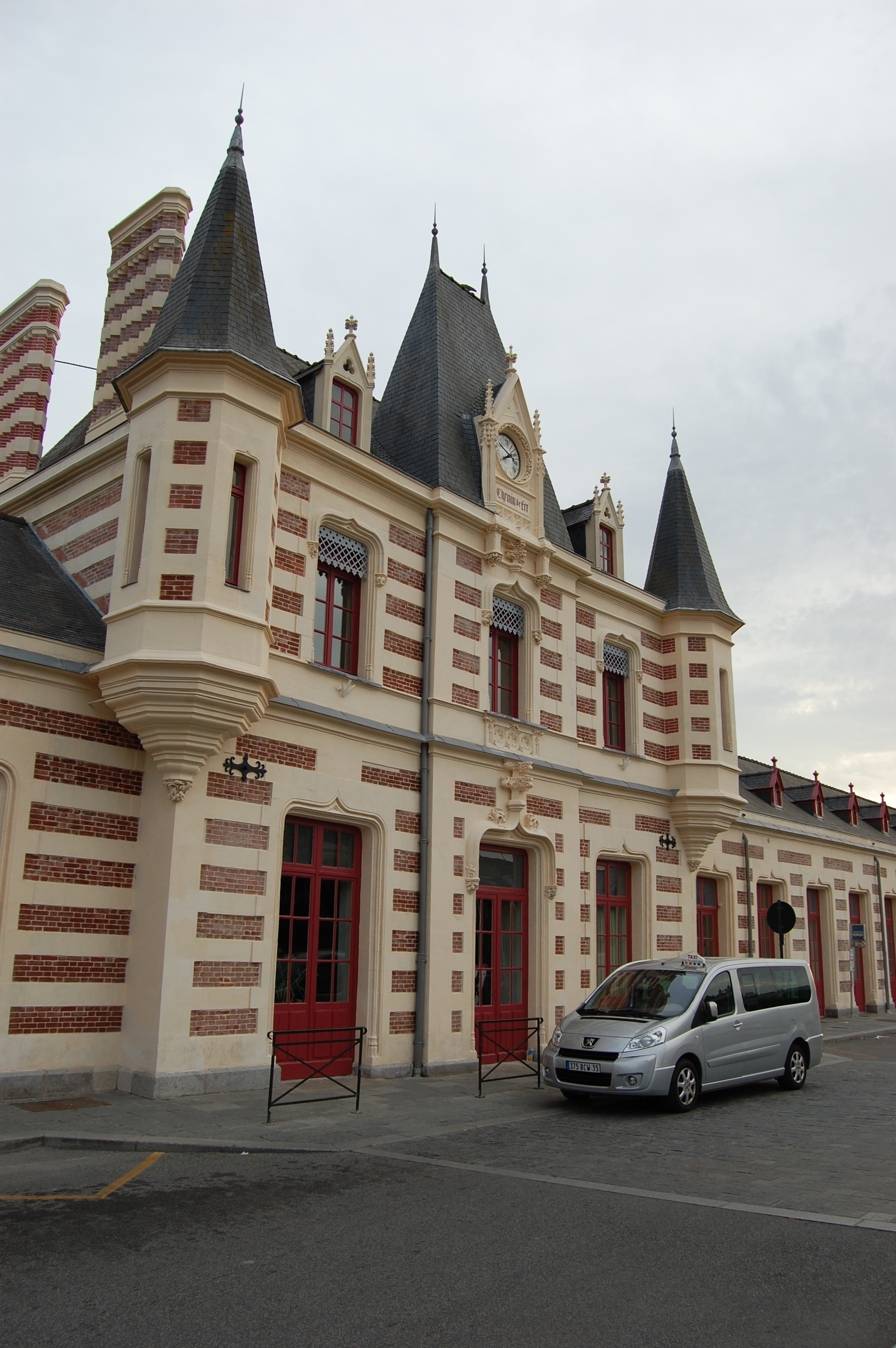
Vitré station

The station is served by high speed trains to Paris and Rennes, and by regional trains (TER Pays de la Loire) towards Rennes, Angers, Laval and Nantes.

Preceding station	SNCF	Following station
Laval towards Montparnasse	TGV	Rennes towards Western France
Preceding station	TER Pays de la Loire	Following station
Les Lacs towards Rennes	27	Saint-Pierre-la-Cour towards Laval
Laval towards Nantes	28	Rennes Terminus

== See also ==
- List of SNCF stations in Brittany
