= Saint-Hilaire-de-Riez station =

Railway station in Saint-Hilaire-de-Riez, France

Saint-Hilaire-de-Riez
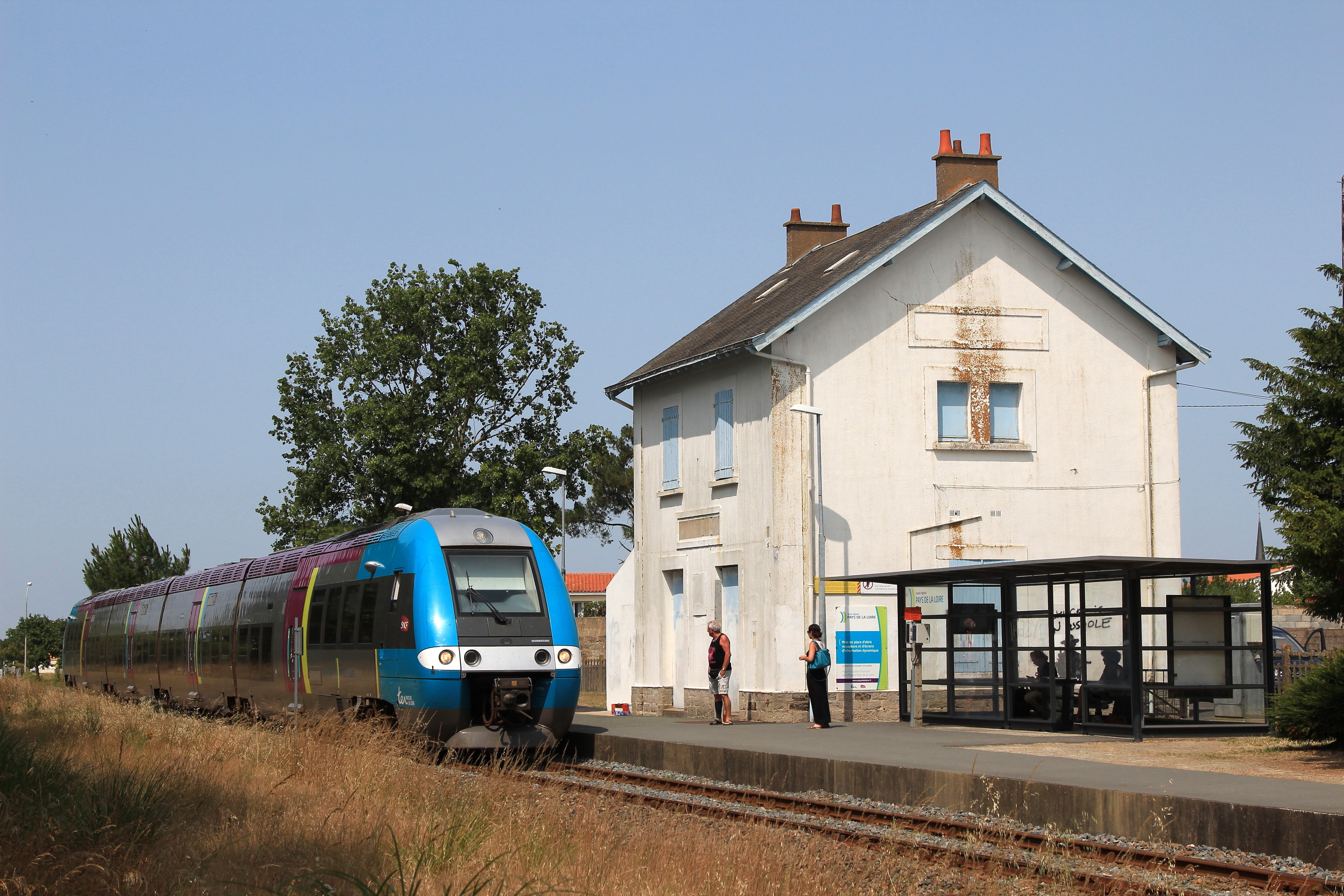
- Saint-Hilaire-de-Riez railway station in 2013

General information
- Location: Saint-Hilaire-de-Riez, Vendée; Pays de la Loire, France
- Coordinates: 46°42′58″N 1°56′59″W
- Line: Commequiers–Saint-Gilles-Croix-de-Vie railway
- Platforms: 1
- Tracks: 1

Other information
- Station code: 87486563

Services
Preceding station	TER Pays de la Loire	Following station
Challans towards Nantes	11	Saint-Gilles-Croix-de-Vie Terminus
Location

Saint-Hilaire-de-Riez is a railway station in Saint-Hilaire-de-Riez, Pays de la Loire, France. The station is located on the Commequiers–Saint-Gilles-Croix-de-Vie railway. The station is served by TER (local) services operated by the SNCF:

- local services (TER Pays de la Loire) Nantes - Sainte-Pazanne - Saint-Gilles-Croix-de-Vie
