= Laval station =

Railway station in France

Coordinates: 48°4′36″N 0°45′39″W

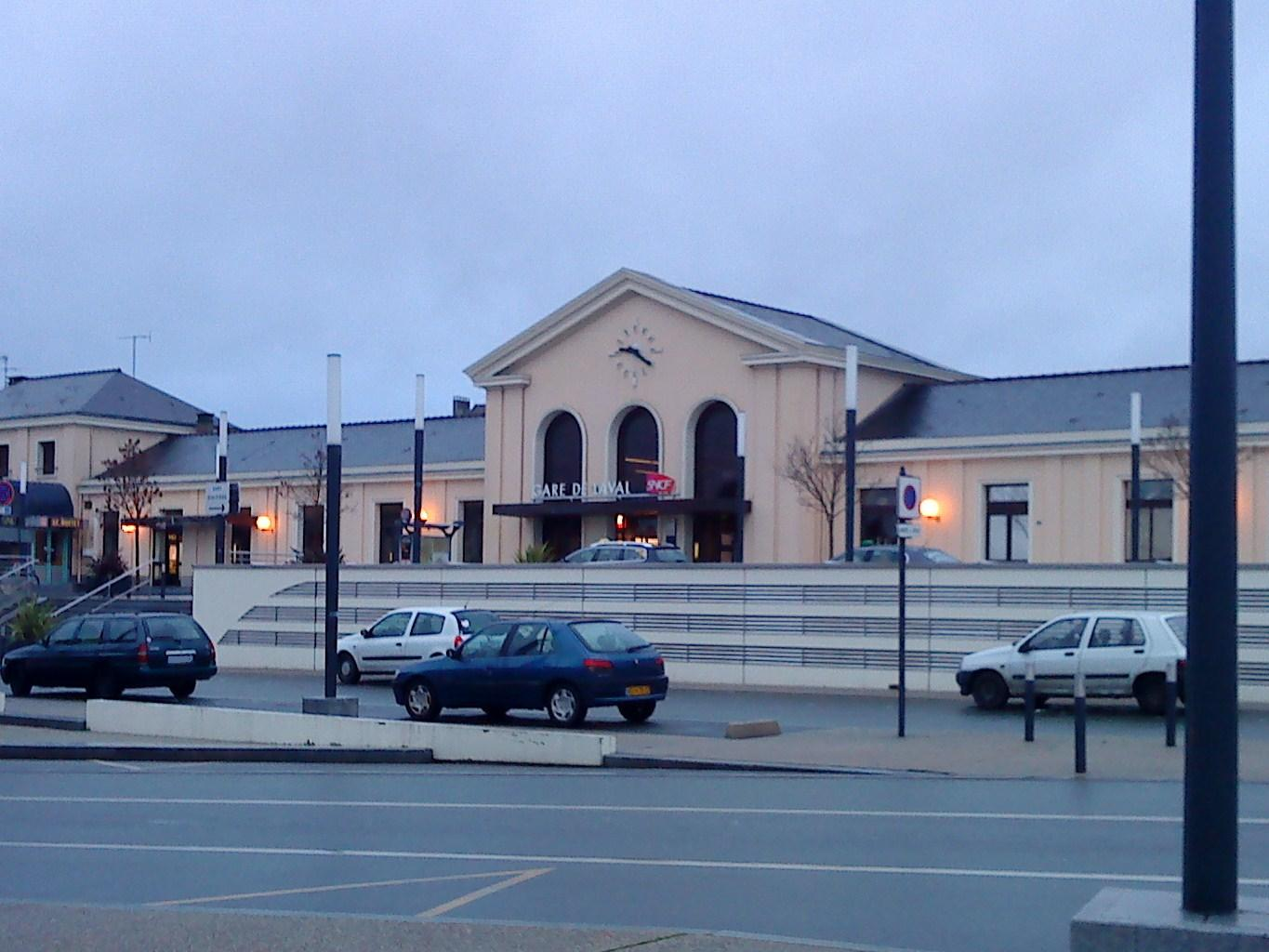
Laval station

Laval station (French: Gare de Laval) is a railway station serving the town of Laval, Mayenne department, western France. It is situated on the Paris–Brest railway.

The station is served by high speed trains to Paris and Rennes, and by regional trains (TER Pays de la Loire) towards Rennes, Angers, Le Mans and Nantes.

Preceding station	TER Pays de la Loire	Following station
Terminus	22	Louverné towards Le Mans
Le Genest towards Rennes	27	Terminus
Sablé-sur-Sarthe towards Nantes	28	Vitré towards Rennes
Preceding station	SNCF	Following station
Le Mans towards Montparnasse	TGV	Vitré towards Western France
Preceding station	Ouigo	Following station
Massy TGV towards Paris-Montparnasse	Grande Vitesse	Rennes Terminus

== See also ==
- List of SNCF stations in Pays de la Loire
