= La Bernerie-en-Retz station =

Railway station in La Bernerie-en-Retz, France

La Bernerie-en-Retz
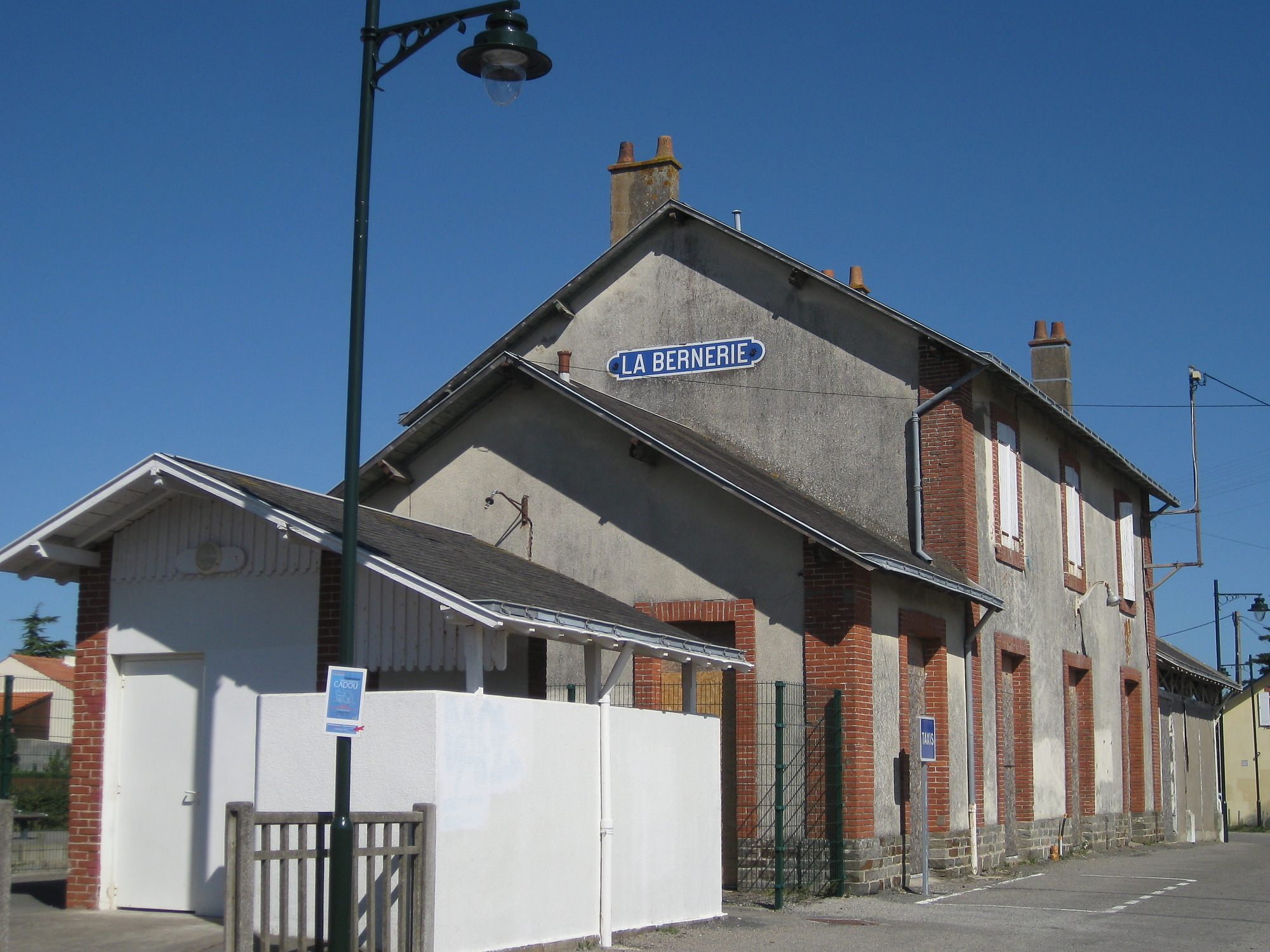
- La Bernerie-en-Retz railway station

General information
- Location: La Bernerie-en-Retz, Loire-Atlantique; Pays de la Loire, France
- Coordinates: 47°04′58″N 2°02′01″W
- Line: Sainte-Pazanne–Pornic railway
- Platforms: 1
- Tracks: 1

Other information
- Station code: 87481267

History
- Opened: 11 September 1875

Services
Preceding station	TER Pays de la Loire	Following station
Les Moutiers-en-Retz towards Nantes	10	Pornic Terminus
Location

La Bernerie-en-Retz is a railway station in La Bernerie-en-Retz, Pays de la Loire, France. The station is located on the Sainte-Pazanne–Pornic railway. The station is served by TER (local) services operated by the SNCF:

- local services (TER Pays de la Loire) Nantes - Sainte-Pazanne - Pornic
