= Rennes–Redon railway =

Coordinates: 47°39′00″N 2°04′53″W

Rennes - Redon railway

Overview
- Status: Operational
- Owner: RFF
- Locale: France (Brittany)
- Termini: Rennes station; Redon station

Service
- System: SNCF
- Operator(s): SNCF

History
- Opened: 1862

Technical
- Line length: 73.2 km (45.5 mi)
- Number of tracks: Double track since 1928
- Track gauge: 1,435 mm (4 ft 8 1/2 in) standard gauge
- Electrification: since 1991 25 kV 50 Hz

The railway from Rennes to Redon is a regional railway line between Rennes and Redon in Ille-et-Vilaine, western France. It's a part of the link between Rennes and Nantes/Quimper.

== Route ==
The line begins in Rennes station and ends in Redon station.

== Line history ==
The line opened on September 21, 1862 with a single track.
