= Redon station =

Railway station in Redon, France

Redon
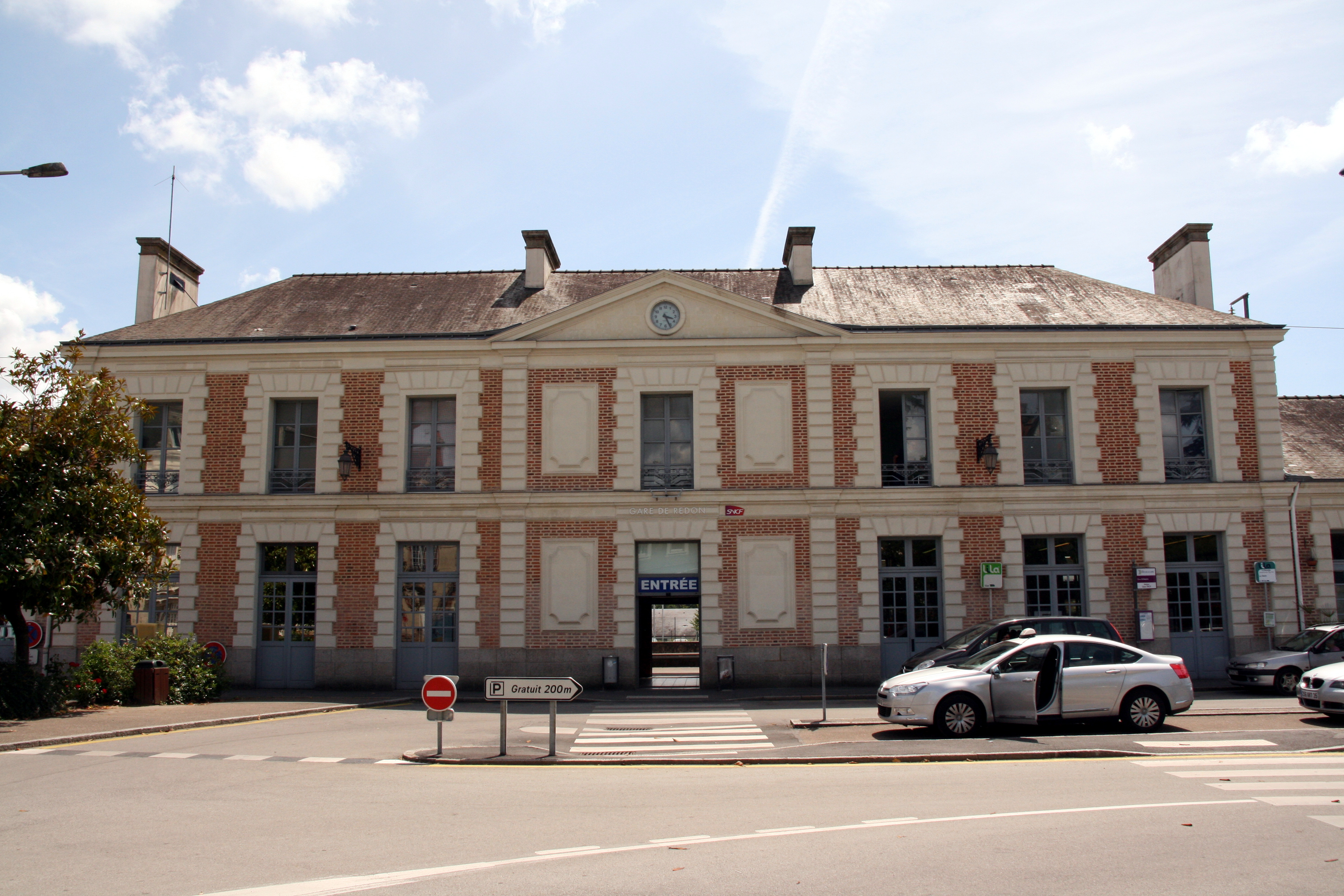
- Redon railway station

General information
- Location: Redon, Ille-et-Vilaine, Brittany, France
- Coordinates: 47°39′6″N 2°5′19″W
- Lines: Rennes–Redon railway Savenay–Landerneau railway
- Platforms: 5

Other information
- Station code: 87471300

History
- Opened: 21 September 1862

Passengers
- 2024: 1,104,562

Services
Preceding station	SNCF	Following station
Vannes towards Quimper	TGV	Rennes towards Montparnasse
Preceding station	TER Bretagne	Following station
Questembert towards Quimper	2	Messac-Guipry towards Rennes
Questembert towards Quimper	3	Saint-Gildas-des-Bois towards Nantes
Malansac towards Vannes	15	Massérac towards Rennes
Preceding station	TER Pays de la Loire	Following station
Terminus	2	Sévérac towards Nantes
Location

Redon is a railway station serving the town of Redon, Ille-et-Vilaine department, western France. The station is situated on the Rennes–Redon railway and the Savenay–Landerneau railway.

== Services ==
The station is served by high speed trains to Quimper and Paris, and regional trains to Quimper, Lorient, Vannes, Nantes and Rennes.

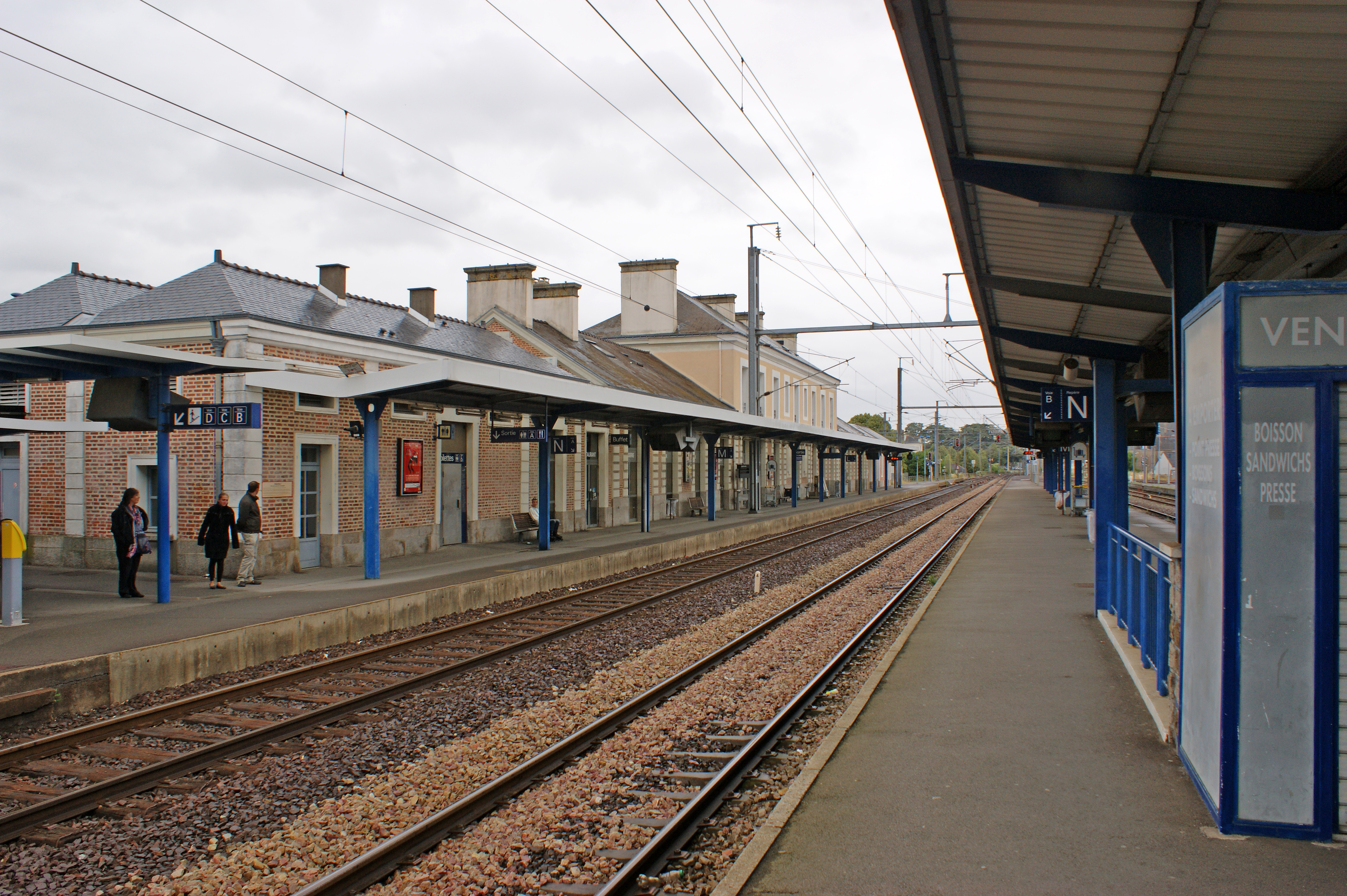
Redon station

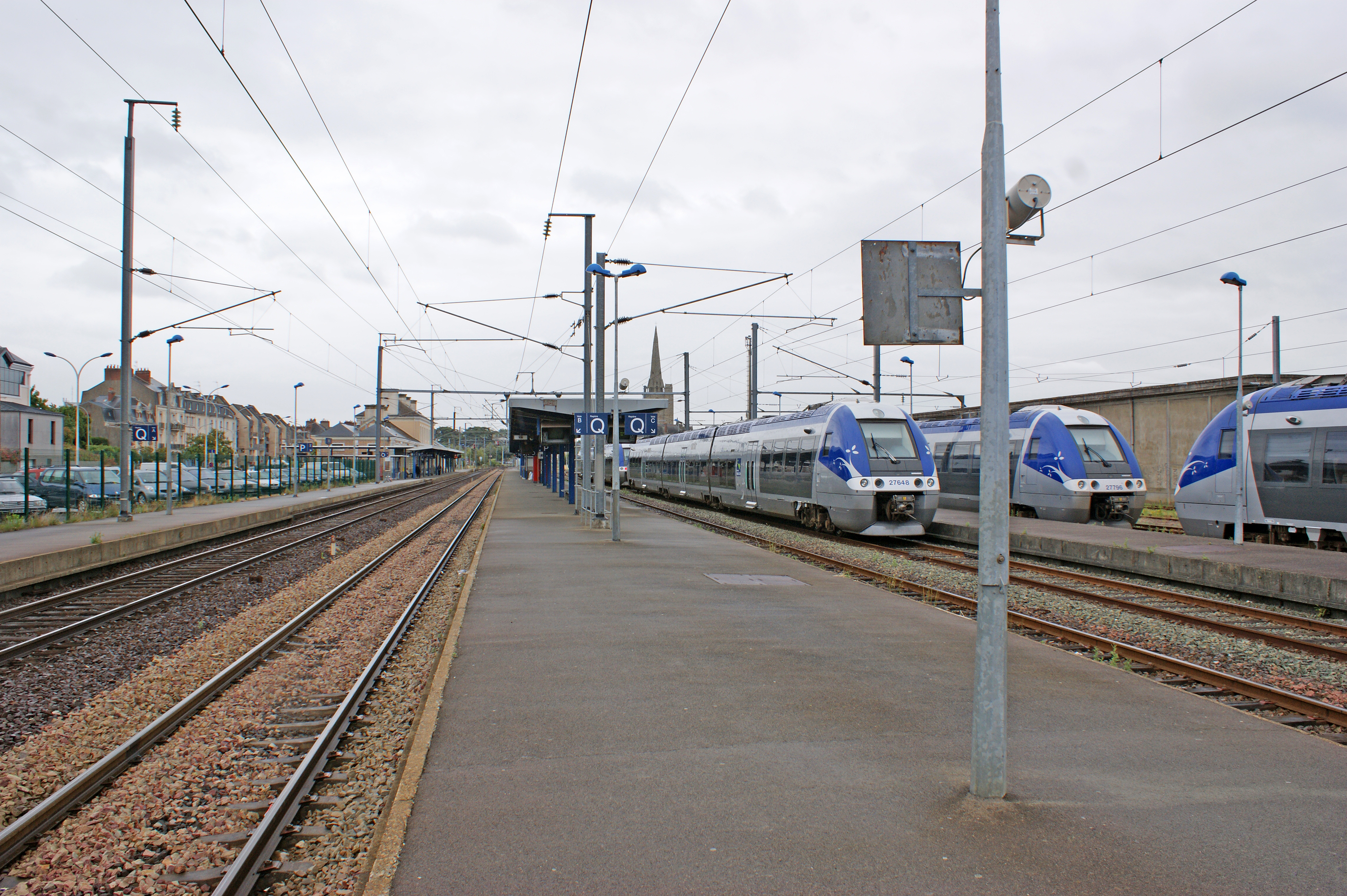
TER AGC units at Redon station
