= Ouigo =

SNCF low-cost rail brand in France, Belgium and Spain

The Ouigo logo

Ouigo (French pronunciation: [wiˈɡo]) is a low-cost service range of both conventional and high-speed trains run by SNCF in France, and also to Belgium in cooperation with NMBS/SNCB. The literal translation of Ouigo from French to English is "yes go"; the name is also a play on words with the English homonym "we go." It is composed of two different services: Ouigo Grande Vitesse, which is a brand of SNCF operating high-speed trains; and Ouigo Vitesse Classique, a brand under which Oslo, a subsidiary of SNCF, operates conventional speed trains.

Ouigo was established in 2013 to offer budget long-distance services on the core routes of the French railway network. The first train ran on 2 April 2013. Ouigo rolling stock was configured in a 'no-frills' arrangement, with minimal onboard amenities and a single class of seating. It was intended that passengers seeking a higher-level service would continue to use SNCF's regular high-speed trains since rebranded as TGV inOui. Ouigo quickly proved popular with the travelling public, selling in excess of 2.5 million tickets during its first year of operation, and was rapidly expanded to cover more stations and regions.

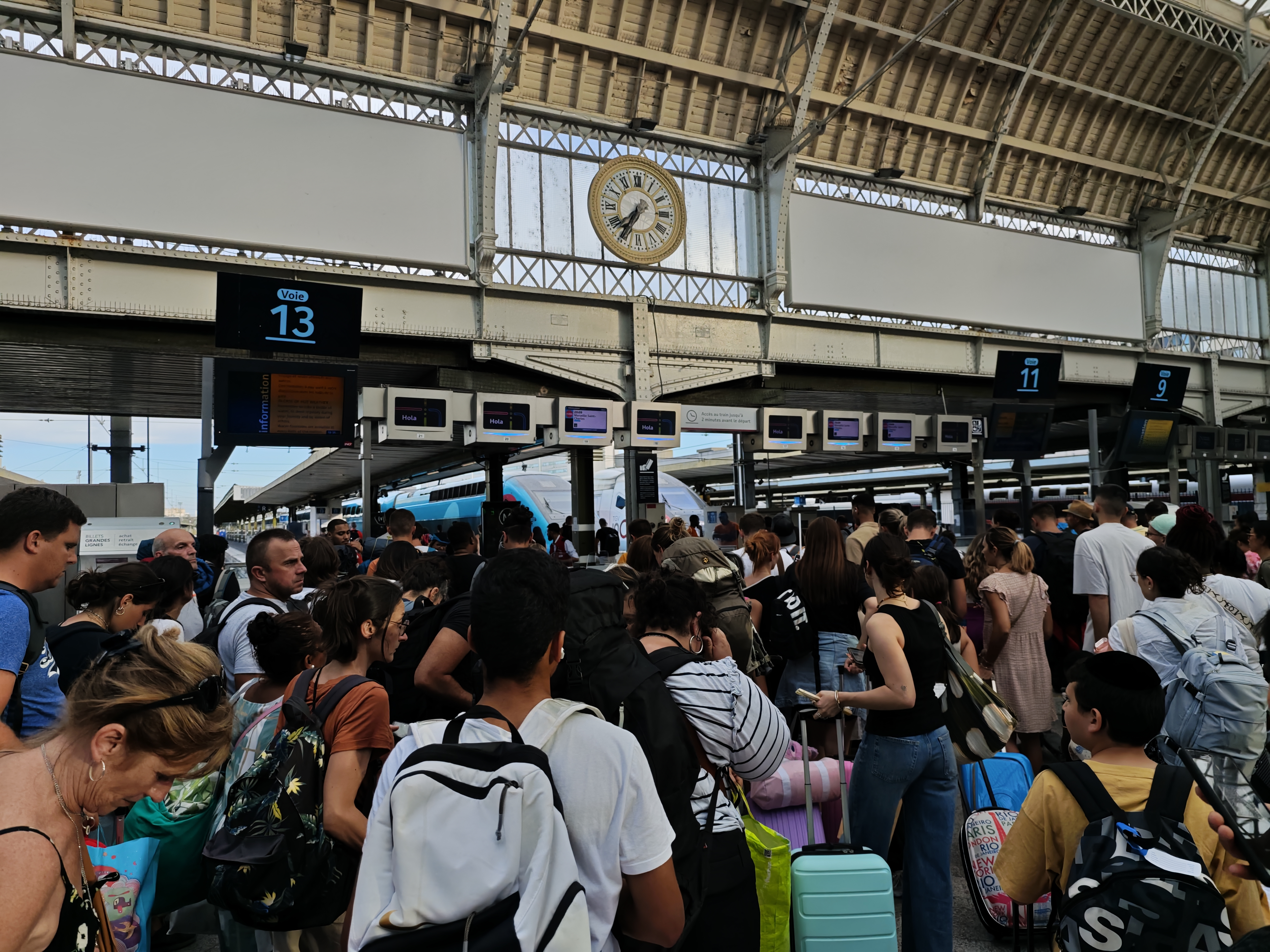
Passengers crowding the platform while boarding a Ouigo high-speed train at Gare de Lyon in Paris.

On 10 December 2017, Ouigo launched a new timetable and began to serve the central Paris termini for the first time. SNCF stated in the late 2010s that they sought for around 25 percent of the travelling public to use the Ouigo service. Originally, Ouigo operated only TGV high-speed train sets, but on 11 April 2022, the Ouigo Vitesse Classique service launched, using older locomotive-hauled rolling stock on conventional lines. This offered slower service, but with even cheaper tickets available. The high-speed service was therefore rebranded as Ouigo Grande Vitesse.

During the early 2020s, SNCF decided to expand Ouigo internationally for the first time, establishing the sister company Ouigo España to offer a similar service in neighbouring Spain.

== History ==
=== Background ===
In contrast to Europe's relatively liberalized airline market (open skies), the high-speed railways of many countries, including France, have traditionally been operated as a monopoly that is financed and owned by the respective national government. During the early twenty-first century, there was an increasing push towards the liberalization of the railways. In particular, the European Union announced targets for reforming high-speed railways for greater involvement of private operators as early as December 2019. Furthermore, competition from low-cost airlines, as well as the anticipation of the deregulation of the intercity bus market, which had happened in Germany during the early 2010s and shortly thereafter in France, motivated incumbent operators to seek to increase their competitiveness. Accordingly, the French state railway operator SNCF decided to launch a low cost operator of high speed trains, which it would brand as Ouigo.

On 19 February 2013, the Ouigo initiative was announced by Guillaume Pepy, the head of SNCF. In an April 2013 interview with CNN Business Traveller, Pepy stated his hope for Ouigo was for it to be successful enough that it could be expanded and, eventually, provide services beyond France to the capitals of neighbouring countries, specifically naming Brussels, Amsterdam and London. Early on, SNCF also stated that it wanted to provide Ouigo services to the south west of France by 2017, principally Bordeaux. In the few months between announcement and the commencement of passenger operators, Ouigo had reportedly sold 200,000 tickets while its website had been visited in excess of two million times.

On 2 April 2013, Ouigo was formally launched, with the first trains being run that same day. On 12 September 2013, SNCF announced that a sales milestone of one million tickets had been sold, and that 35 percent had been purchased for less than €35. On 1 April 2014, SNCF announced that Ouigo had sold over 2.5 million tickets since launch, of which 80 percent had been priced at €25 or less. It also announced that the Ouigo website had been visited roughly 10 million times.

=== Expansion ===
On 3 September 2015, SNCF announced that additional Ouigo services would commence during the first quarter of 2016; these would link Tourcoing (near Lille) with Lyon-Part-Dieu, Nantes and Rennes, having intermediate stops in TGV Haute-Picardie, Aéroport Charles de Gaulle, Massy TGV, Le Mans and Angers-Saint-Laud. Tickets for these destinations first went on sale on 17 November 2015. It was later announced that Ouigo would start serving these new destinations on 13 December 2015. At the same time, SNCF announced the relaunch and expansion of its IDBus long-distance bus service as Ouibus, aligning its branding with that of Ouigo, and sharing the same no-frills low-cost online travel service under the collective banner of #Oui. This service offered €10 million reduced-priced tickets for sale during 2016.

In May 2017, SNCF rebranded its TGV service as TGV inOui to align it as a high-end counterpart to the low-cost services provided by Ouigo. By this point, Ouigo reportedly carried 5 percent of all high-speed passengers in France. SNCF stated that by 2020, its goal was for 25% of all high-speed passengers to travel aboard Ouigo services, which was set to expand its coverage to 30 destinations using its fleet of 34 trainsets. The initial routes served by Ouigo at the launch of operations, along LGV Sud-Est, LGV Rhône-Alpes and LGV Méditerranée, have proved to be among the most frequently trafficked on the French high-speed network. During the late 2010s, SNCF stated that the growth of its high-speed services has been primarily due to Ouigo's expansion.

On 10 December 2017, Ouigo launched a new timetable, under which it ran services to stations within the centre of Paris for the first time. Specifically, destinations across western France were directly connected to Gare Montparnasse, while two round trips per day were in operation on both the Paris - Bordeaux and Paris - Le Mans - Nantes routes, along with a single daily service between Paris and Rennes. Ouigo opted to charge more for tickets that board within central Paris rather than at Massy, Marne-la-Valley, or Roissy Charles de Gaulle Airport on the periphery of the city. In July 2018, Gare de l'Est joined the Ouigo network, while Ouigo services from Gare de Lyon were launched later that same year. On 6 July 2019, direct trains between Gare Montparnasse and Toulouse commenced, replacing a former TGV InOui service as well as marking the expansion of Ouigo into southwest France.

Since June 2020, Ouigo has been running services between inner city stations of both Paris and Lyon. Furthermore, the inner city train stations of Lyon-Perrache and Lyon-Part-Dieu have also been included in the route network, along with direct connections to the center of Paris. During winter 2020/21, Ouigo trains were run in the French Alps to Grenoble and further along the Tarentaise to Albertville, Moutiers-Salins-Brides-les-Bains, Aime-la-Plagne and Bourg-Saint-Maurice.

=== International and classic services ===
On 22 September 2020, SNCF announced via its Spanish subsidiary Rielsfera, that high-speed services in Spain would be launched during the following year as a part of its low-cost brand, using the name Ouigo España. The Spanish service was to be largely modelled on that of the existing Ouigo operation. Ouigo España launched in 2021, and carried roughly two million passengers in its first twelve months of operation.

Between 2013 and 2021, Ouigo exclusively operated high-speed TGV train sets for its services. However, in September 2021, it was announced that 14 new services would be launched using conventional locomotive-hauled trains under the new Ouigo Vitesse Classique branding, while its high-speed services were rebranded as Ouigo Grande Vitesse. Both operations shared the same low-cost business model, with the new Classique services making intensive use of refurbished Corail coaches originally built for SNCF during the 1970s and 1980s. On 11 April 2022, the Ouigo Vitesse Classique service was launched, initially operating three trains per day along a pair of conventional lines that served a total of 14 stations. At the time, Christophe Fanichet, CEO of SNCF Voyageurs, stated that if the service proved successful, new routes would likely be intentionally parallel to heavily trafficked car routes.

View source data.

Source: Les Echos

== Concept ==
The idea of service is based on low-cost airlines such as Ryanair and EasyJet; accordingly, Ouigo operates the following practices:

- Tickets can only be bought online through a dedicated website or mobile app, not from ticket machines, or ticket counters. Since October 2013, customers can also book tickets via the non-affiliated booking agent Captain Train. Four days before passengers travel, they receive an e-mail of the ticket which they may print out at home, or they may use the mobile app to access the e-ticket.
- Use of high-density trainsets.
- Similar to some low-cost airlines, whilst a piece of hand luggage (maximum size, 35 cm × 55 cm × 25 cm; 14″ × 22″ × 10″) is allowed free of charge, larger bags must be paid for.
- Like the low-cost carriers' use of secondary airports (e.g., Paris-Beauvais) instead of major airports (e.g., Paris-Charles de Gaulle), the company uses some non-major railway stations (e.g. Tourcoing for Lille and Gare de Marne-la-Vallée–Chessy for Paris). The reason is the same: Ouigo uses these outgoing stations due to lower fees imposed by the rail network company, SNCF Réseau.
- The trains carry fewer staff, who (like low-cost airlines' staff) are tasked to do basic maintenance of the train as well as serving passengers.
- The company puts their own trains on a 13-hour shift daily, instead of the regular SNCF TGV 7-hour shift. This maximises vehicle utilisation, as it reduces trainset downtime in the depot and increases the number of seats sold.
- Like some low-cost air carriers, the only way customers can contact the company is via their website. There is no customer service phone number or e-mail address.

== Ouigo Grande Vitesse ==
Ouigo Grande Vitesse

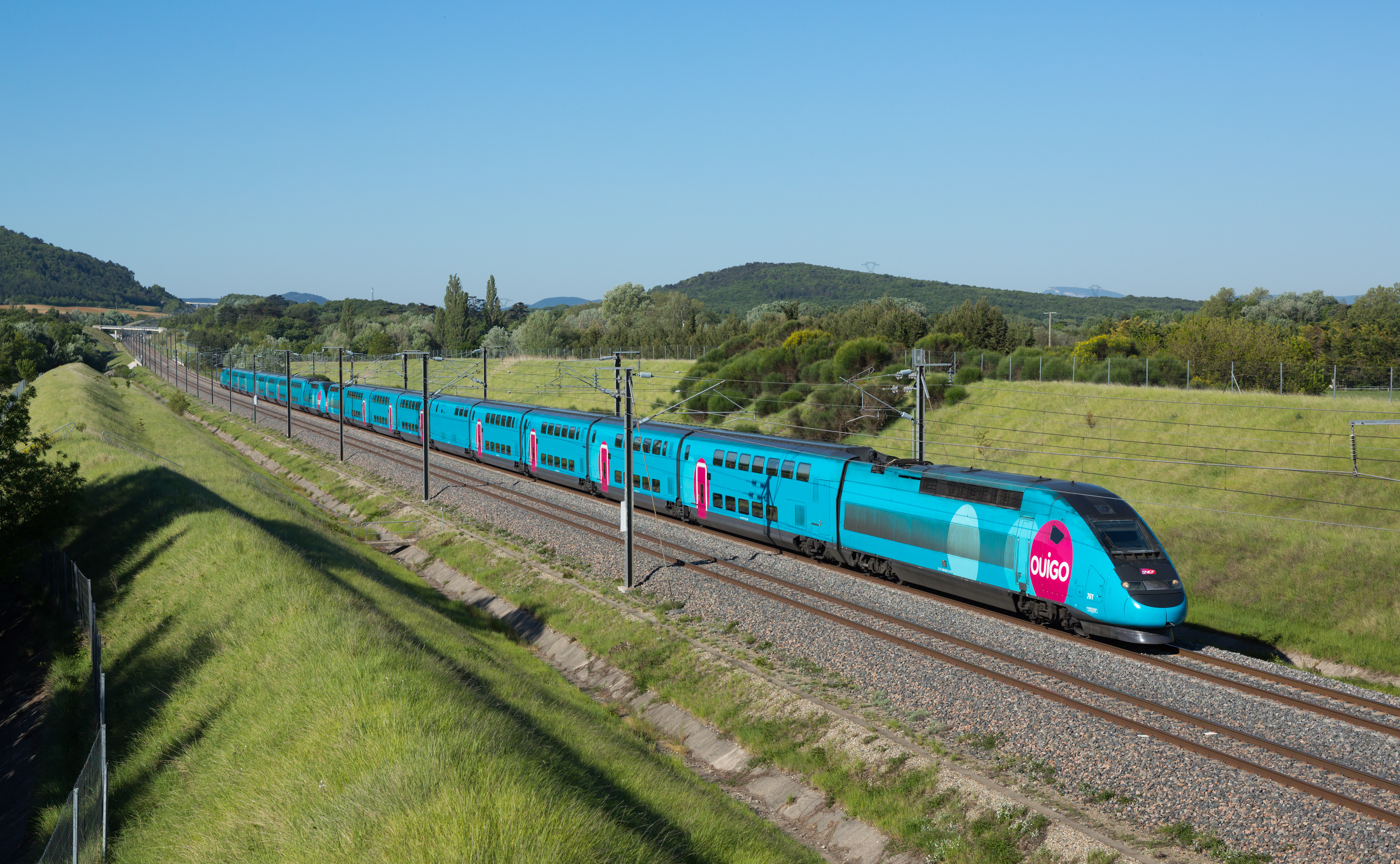
- A Ouigo Grande Vitesse train
- Main station: France
- Stations called at: 59

Other
- Website: www.ouigo.com

=== Stations ===
As of January 2024, Ouigo Grande Vitesse offers year-round service to 48 stations in France, going as far as Tourcoing, Strasbourg, Nice, Montpellier-Saint-Roch, Toulouse via Bordeaux-Saint-Jean, Nantes, and Rennes, as well as winter seasonal service to 5 stations between Grenoble and Bourg St Maurice, and summer seasonal service to 5 stations between Sète and Perpignan.

=== OGV network ===
Ouigo Grande Vitesse serves the following lines:

- Tourcoing – Aéroport Charles de Gaulle 2 TGV – Marne-la-Vallée–Chessy – Lyon-Part-Dieu – Valence TGV – Nîmes-Pont-du-Gard – Montpellier Sud de France
- Tourcoing – TGV Haute-Picardie – Aéroport Charles de Gaulle 2 TGV – Marne-la-Vallée–Chessy – Massy TGV – Saint-Pierre-des-Corps – Poitiers – Angoulême – Bordeaux-Saint-Jean
- Lille-Flandres – TGV Haute-Picardie – Aéroport Charles de Gaulle 2 TGV – Marne-la-Vallée–Chessy – Lyon-Saint-Exupéry TGV – Avignon TGV – Aix-en-Provence TGV – Marseille-Saint-Charles
- Nantes – Angers-Saint-Laud – Le Mans – Massy TGV – Paris-Montparnasse
- Rennes – Laval – Massy TGV – Paris-Montparnasse
- Paris-Est – Metz-Ville – Strasbourg-Ville
- Paris-Montparnasse – Saint-Pierre-des-Corps – Poitiers – Bordeaux-Saint-Jean
- Paris-Montparnasse – Bordeaux-Saint-Jean – Agen – Montauban-Ville-Bourbon – Toulouse-Matabiau
- Paris-Lyon – Lyon-Saint-Exupéry TGV – Aix-en-Provence TGV – Toulon – Les Arcs–Draguignan – Saint-Raphaël-Valescure – Cannes – Antibes – Nice-Ville
- Paris-Lyon – Avignon TGV – Aix-en-Provence TGV – Marseille-Saint-Charles
- Paris-Lyon – Valence TGV – Nîmes – Montpellier-Saint-Roch

=== Rolling stock ===
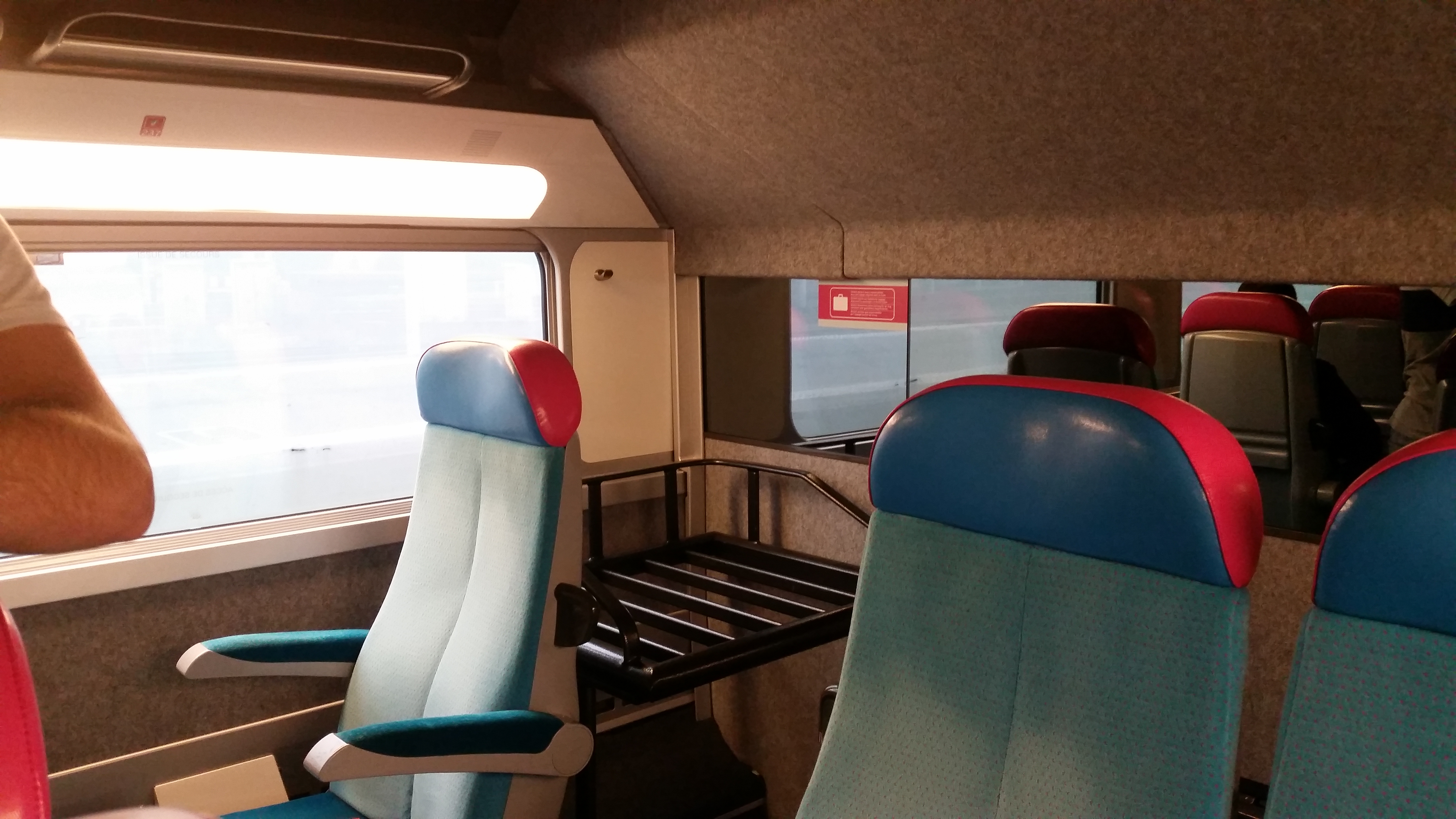
Ouigo train interior

Ouigo Grande Vitesse uses modified double-decker TGV Duplex trains, which are single 2nd class cars made up of either 2 × 2 or 3 × 1 abreast non-reclining seats, and lack a buffet car. This gives a capacity of 1268 passengers (634 per trainset), which is 20% more passengers than regular TGV Duplex trains.

=== Fare structure ===
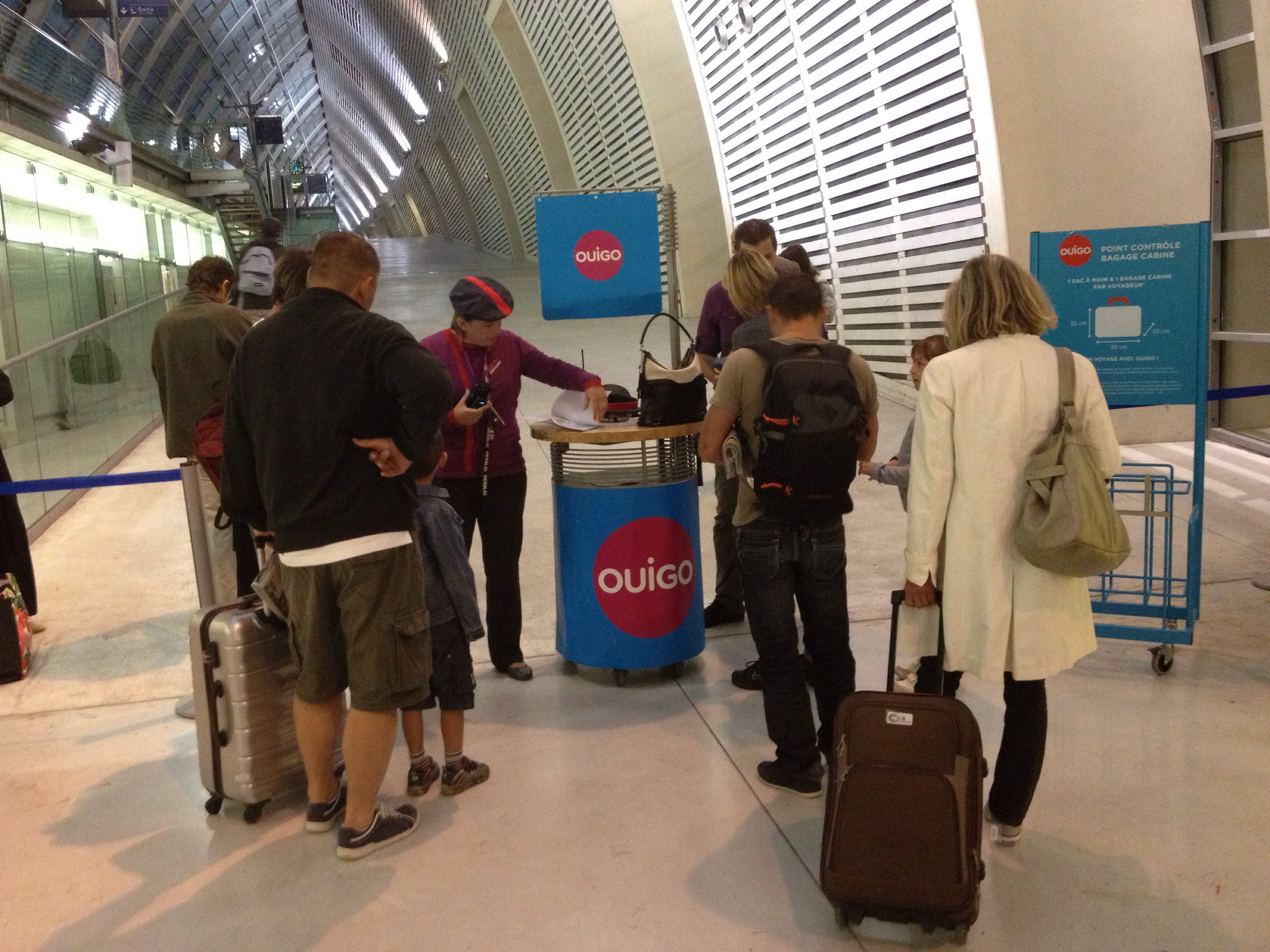
Ouigo check-in desk

As of May 2026, adult fares can range from €10 to a maximum of €119 per journey depending on the time of the journey and how far it is booked in advance. Supplementary fees are as follows:

- Children aged 11 or under are charged a flat fee of €5 for all journeys.
- Baggage (per piece) is €5 if booked at the time of booking, €10 if booked prior to travelling, or €20 if purchased at the station immediately prior to travel.
- Pets can be taken on board for free if under 6 kilograms (13 lb) and carried as part of a hand luggage case. Pets outside these requirements are charged a fee of €40 per animal, or €30 if they are booked at the same time as the owner.
- Seats next to plug sockets can be reserved for a supplementary fee of €2 per person.
- Tickets are not part of the European rail ticket network, and don't appear in all booking systems. This also means Interrail & Eurail passes are not valid, as well as through-ticketing not being possible.

== Ouigo Train Classique ==
Ouigo Train Classique

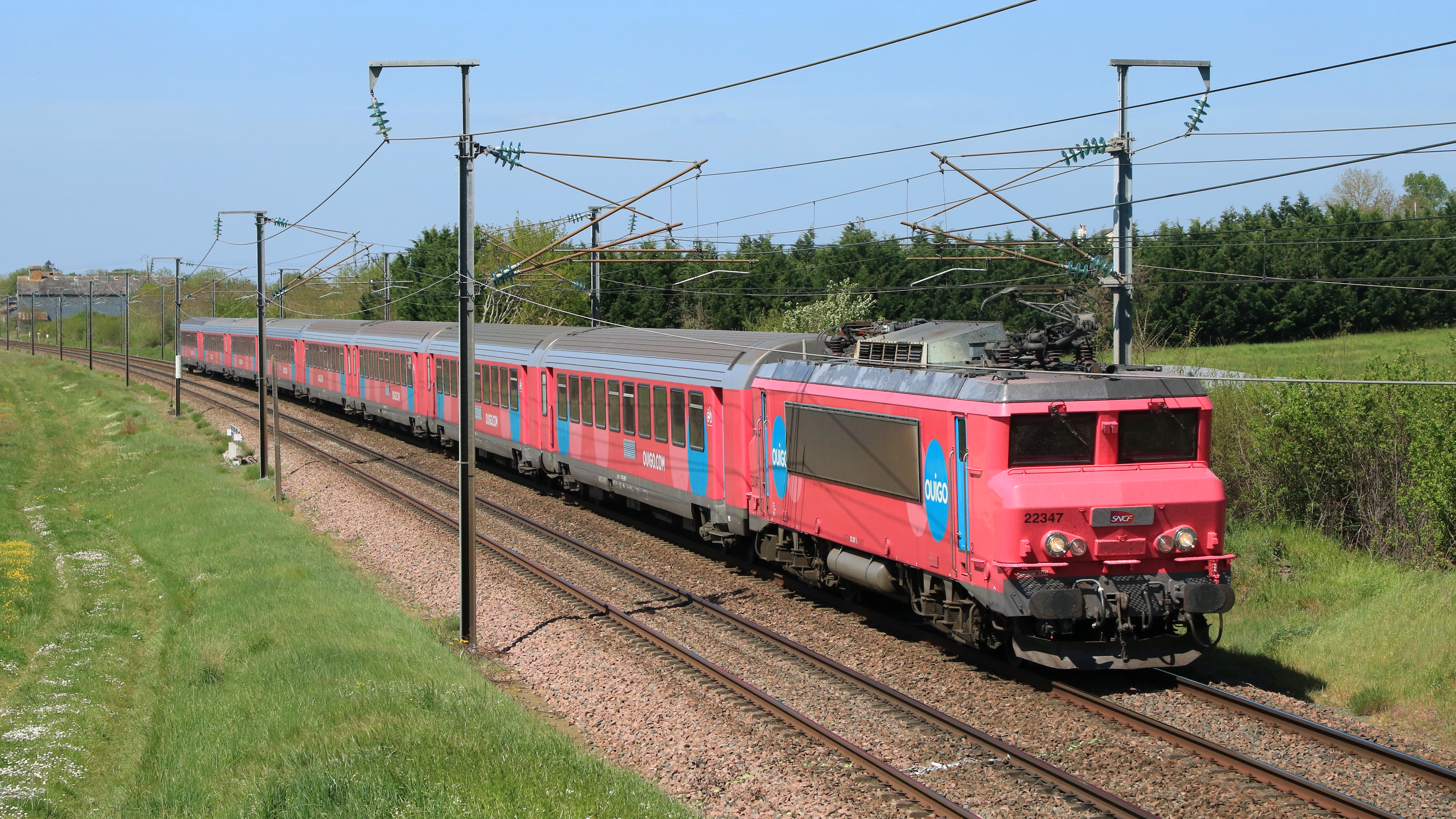
- A Ouigo Train Classique trainset
- Main station: France
- Stations called at: 19
- Parent company: SNCF Voyageurs

Other
- Website: www.ouigo.com

Introduced in April 2022, this service serves as a successor to the Intercités 100% Eco services which were discontinued in 2020.

Unlike the high-speed service, Ouigo Train Classique is operated by a subsidiary of SNCF Voyages Développement named Oslo (Offre de Services Librement Organisés). The line between Paris and Brussels remains operated by SNCF Voyageurs itself.

=== OTC network ===
Ouigo Train Classique serves four lines:

- Paris-Austerlitz – Juvisy – Massy-Palaiseau – Versailles-Chantiers – Chartres – Le Mans – Angers-Saint-Laud – Nantes
- Paris-Austerlitz – Juvisy – Les Aubrais – Blois – Saint-Pierre-des-Corps – Saumur – Angers-Saint-Laud – Nantes
- Paris-Austerlitz – Juvisy – Massy-Palaiseau – Versailles-Chantiers – Chartres – Le Mans – Laval – Rennes
- Paris Nord – Creil – Aulnoye-Aymeries – Mons – Brussels-South

==== Discontinued services ====
From April 2022 to 15 December 2024:

- Paris Bercy – Villeneuve-Saint-Georges – Melun – Dijon-Ville – Chalon-sur-Saône – Mâcon-Ville – Lyon-Perrache

=== Rolling stock ===
Domestic services use Corail cars, hauled by SNCF Class BB 22200 locomotives. The Paris North to Brussels-South uses NMBS/SNCB I11 coaches pulled by Belgian Railways Class 18 locomotives.

=== Fare structure ===
- As of May 2026, ticket price varies from €10 to €59 on all routes.
- Children that are 11 or under are charged a flat fee of €5 no matter the journey.
- Baggage (per piece) is €5 if booked at the time of booking, €10 if booked prior to travelling, or €20 if purchased at the station immediately prior to travel.
- Bikes can be carried on board for a €10 fee at the time of booking.

== Reception ==
During the first few months of operation, Ouigo sent passengers a short questionnaire after each trip, and had a 20 percent response rate. The responses gathered reportedly surprised the company, with roughly half of the passengers saying they came from the regular TGV service, short of the 70 percent that the company had envisaged, while a quarter of respondents said they would have not made the trip without Ouigo. The survey also reported that about 90 percent of passengers would recommend Ouigo to a friend or family member.

Commentators such as the travel journalist Simon Calder have said that Ouigo is a third-class train service, while the rail writer Mark Smith called it a rail service for flyers. The head of the rail division of the trade union CGT Bruno Charrier, referred to Ouigo as being a train service created for the poor. Initially, non-French customers had issues trying to book tickets, as the booking service required a French mobile phone number and postcode. However, since October 2013, the website has been changed to allow foreign customers to book tickets; the phone number is needed to provide information by text message for passengers in case of any issues.

Among English-speaking high-speed rail advocates, The British HSR lobbying group, Greengauge 21 is keen on the idea of low-cost high-speed rail service, and with it, the possibility of employing underused stations such as Stratford International and Ebbsfleet International.

== See also ==
- List of high-speed railway lines
- Ouigo España
