= Château-du-Loir station =

Railway station in Château-du-Loir, France

Coordinates: 47°40′59″N 0°24′54″E

Château-du-Loir
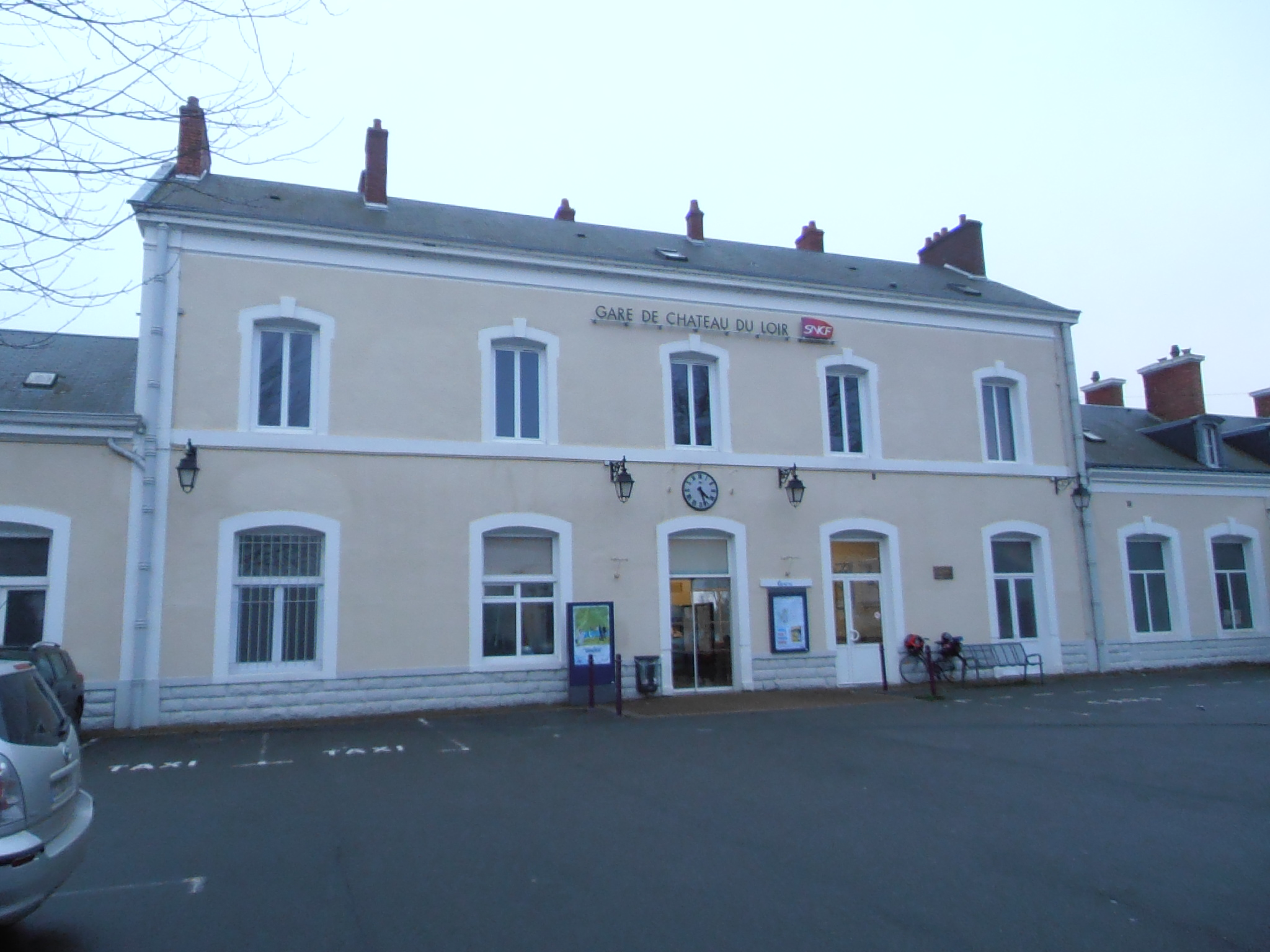

General information
- Location: Rue du Val de Loir; 72500 Château-du-Loir; Sarthe, France
- Elevation: 49 m (161 ft)
- Owner: SNCF
- Operator: SNCF
- Platforms: 2
- Tracks: 2

Other information
- Station code: 87396606

History
- Opened: 19 July 1858

Passengers
- 2018: 159 432

Services
Preceding station	TER Pays de la Loire	Following station
Vaas towards Le Mans	25	Saint-Paterne-Racan towards Tours
Location

Gare de Château-du-Loir is a railway station serving the town Château-du-Loir, Sarthe department, western France.

== Services ==
The station is served by regional trains to Le Mans and Tours.
