= Vertou station =

Railway station in Vertou, France

Vertou
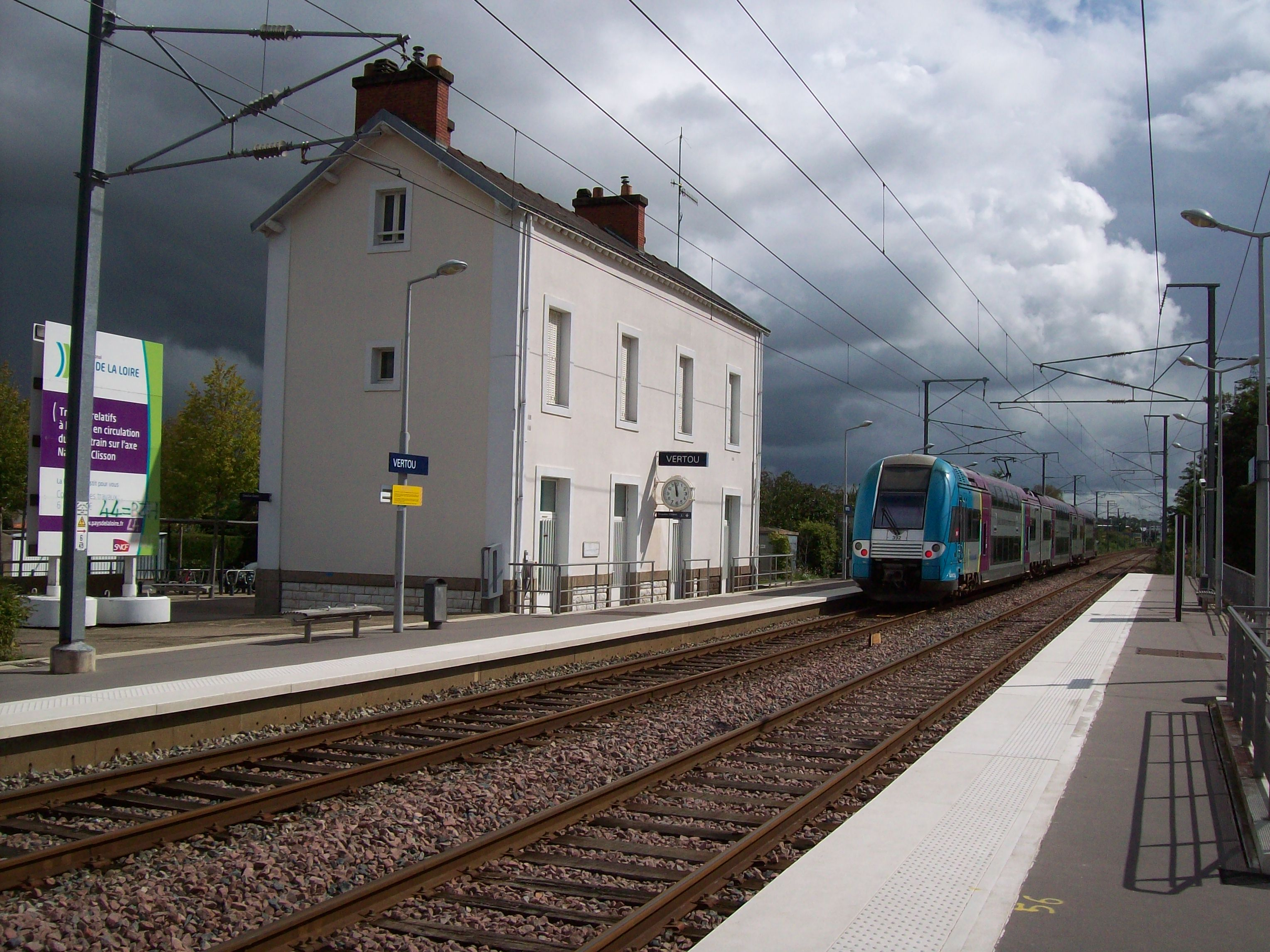
- Vertou railway station

General information
- Location: Vertou, Loire-Atlantique; Pays de la Loire, France
- Coordinates: 47°11′10″N 1°28′41″W
- Line: Nantes-Saintes railway
- Platforms: 3
- Tracks: 3

Other information
- Station code: 87481408

Services
Preceding station	TER Pays de la Loire	Following station
Saint-Sébastien-Frêne-Rond towards Nantes	T2	La Haie-Fouassière towards Clisson
Location

Vertou is a railway station in Vertou, Pays de la Loire, France. The station is located on the Nantes-Saintes railway. Since 15 June 2011 the station is served by a tram-train service between Nantes and Clisson operated by the SNCF. The following services currently call at Vertou:

- local service (TER Pays de la Loire) Nantes - Clisson
