= La Roche-sur-Yon station =

Railway station in La Roche-sur-Yon, France

Coordinates: 46°40′21″N 1°26′8″W

La Roche-sur-Yon
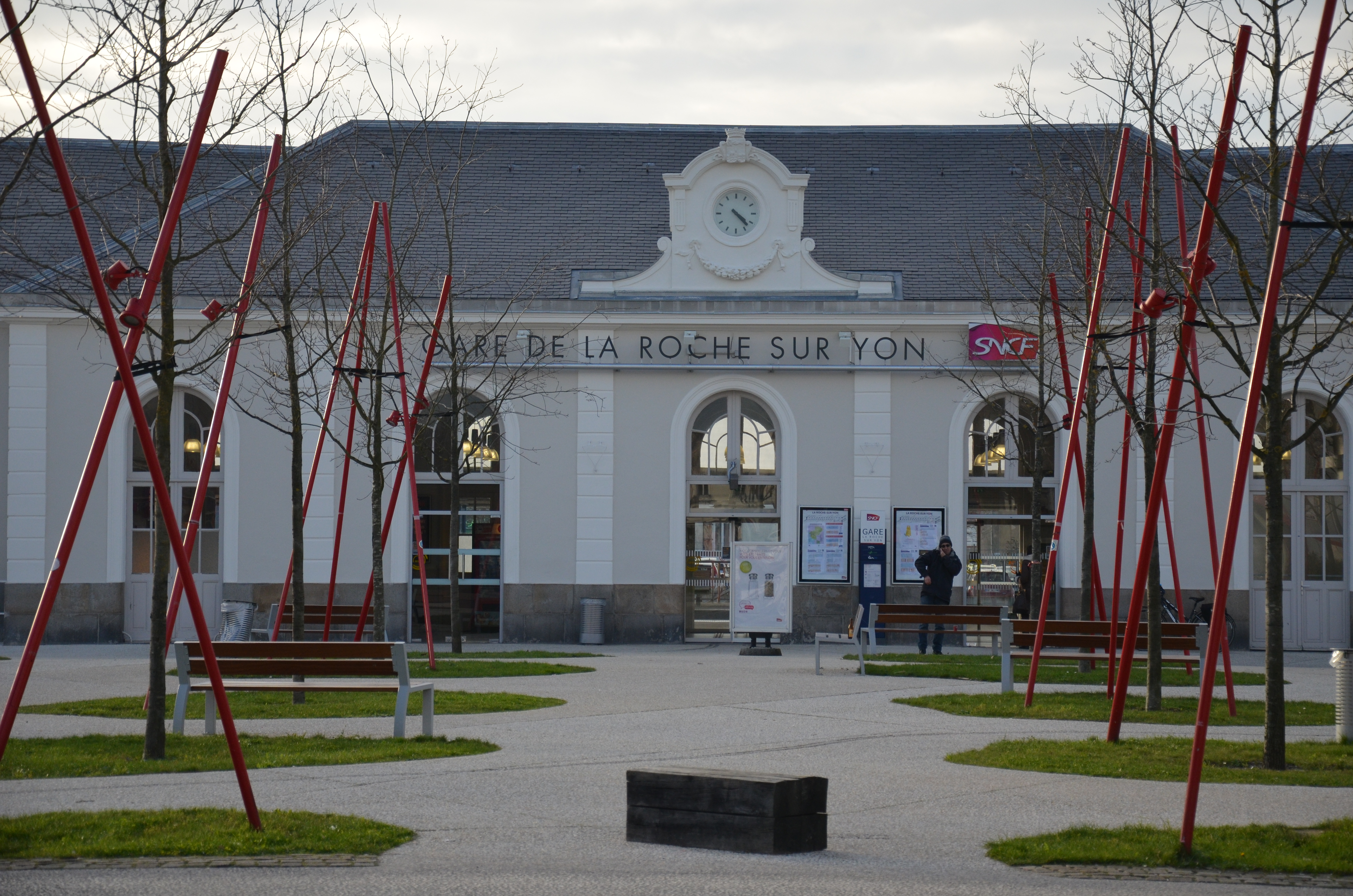

General information
- Location: Place d'Estienne d'Orves; 85000 La Roche-sur-Yon; Vendée, France
- Owner: SNCF
- Operator: SNCF
- Platforms: 4
- Tracks: 5

Other information
- Station code: 87486019

History
- Opened: 20 December 1866
- Former names: Gare de Napoléon-Vendée

Passengers
- 2024: 1,218,501
Services
Preceding station	SNCF	Following station
Nantes towards Montparnasse	TGV	Les Sables-d'Olonne Terminus
Nantes Terminus	Intercités	Luçon towards Bordeaux
Preceding station	TER Pays de la Loire	Following station
Belleville-sur-Vie towards Nantes	8	La Mothe-Achard towards Les Sables-d'Olonne
Nantes Terminus	9	Luçon towards La Rochelle
Terminus	14	La Chaize-le-Vicomte towards Tours
Location

Gare de La Roche-sur-Yon is a railway station serving the town La Roche-sur-Yon, Vendée department, western France.

== History ==
Opened in 1866, the station was originally called Napoléon-Vendée by the Compagnie des chemins de fer de la Vendée. Both ownership and operations have since been transferred to SNCF.

== Services ==
The following services currently call at La Roche-sur-Yon:

- TGV services Paris-Montparnasse - Les Sables d'Olonne
- Intercity services (Intercités) Nantes - La Rochelle - Bordeaux
- TER Pays de la Loire services
  - Line 8 Nantes - Les Sables d'Olonne
  - Line 9 Nantes - La Rochelle
  - Line 14 La Roche-sur-Yon - Saumur
