= Angers-Saint-Laud station =

Railway station in France

Angers–Saint-Laud
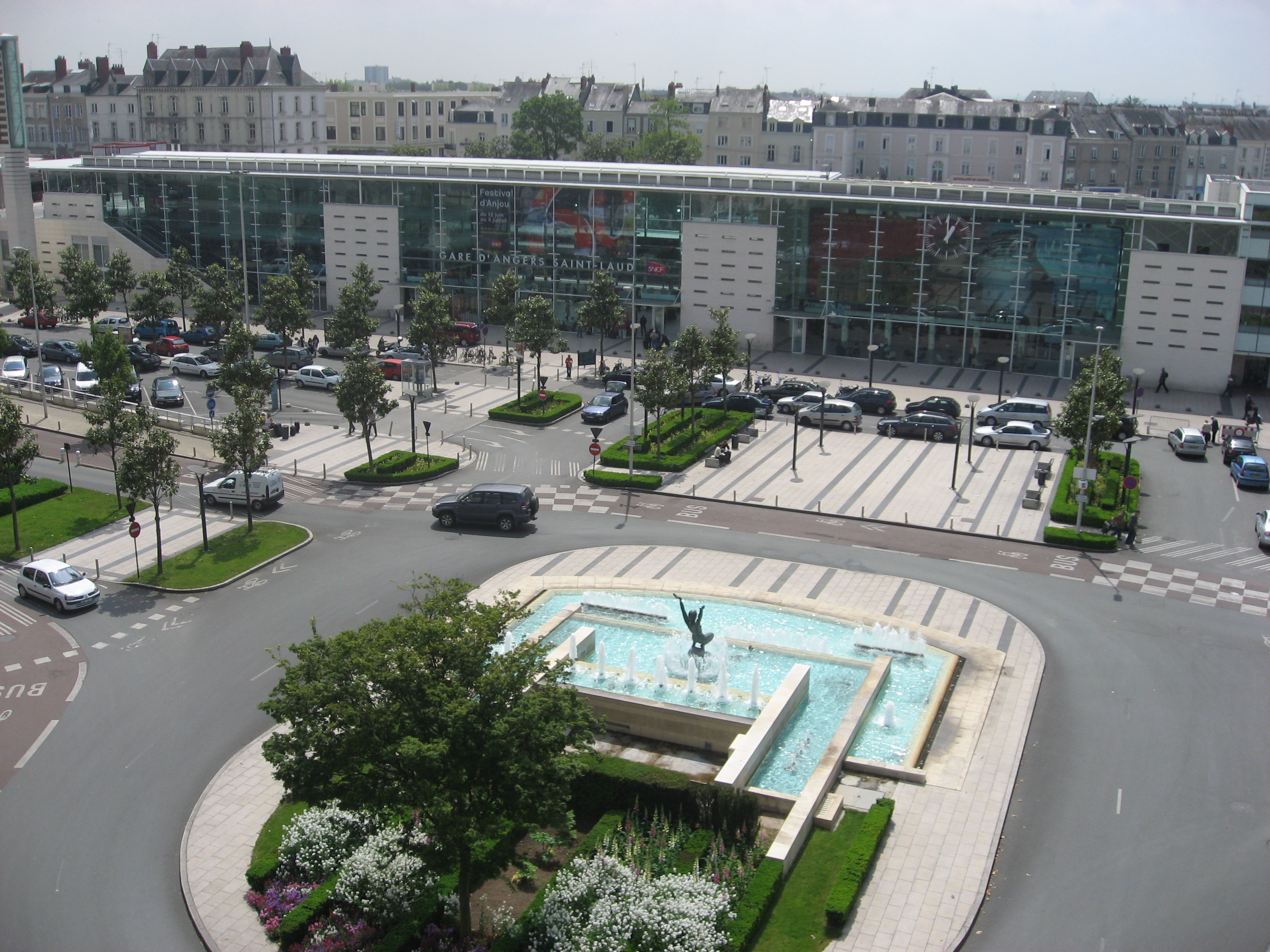
- Angers-Saint-Laud railway station

General information
- Location: Angers, Maine-et-Loire, Pays de la Loire, France
- Coordinates: 47°27′53″N 0°33′25″W
- Owner: SNCF
- Operator: SNCF
- Lines: Le Mans–Angers railway Tours–Saint-Nazaire railway
- Platforms: 3
- Tracks: 5
- Connections: Angers tramway

Other information
- Station code: IATA: QXG

History
- Opened: 1 August 1849

Passengers
- 2024: 7,116,373

Services
Preceding station	SNCF	Following station
Nantes Terminus	Intercités	Saumur towards Lyon-Perrache
Nantes Terminus	TGV	Le Mans towards Montparnasse
Nantes Terminus	TGV	Le Mans towards Eastern France
Nantes Terminus	TGV	Saumur towards Montpellier
Nantes Terminus	TGV	Saint-Pierre-des-Corps towards Eastern France
Preceding station	Le Réseau Rémi	Following station
Ancenis towards Nantes	2.6	Saumur towards Orléans
Preceding station	TER Pays de la Loire	Following station
Savennières-Béhuard towards Nantes	4	Terminus
Terminus	19	La Bohalle towards Tours
Terminus	20	Savennières-Béhuard towards Cholet
Ancenis towards Nantes	21	Angers-Maître-École towards Le Mans
Ancenis towards Nantes	28	Sablé towards Rennes
Preceding station	Ouigo	Following station
Le Mans towards Paris-Montparnasse	Grande Vitesse	Nantes Terminus
Le Mans towards Paris-Austerlitz	Train Classique	Nantes Terminus
Saumur towards Paris-Austerlitz	Train Classique	Nantes Terminus
Location

Angers–Saint-Laud is a railway station located in Angers, Maine-et-Loire, western France. The station was opened in 1849 and is located on the Le Mans–Angers railway and the Tours–Saint-Nazaire railway. The train services are operated by SNCF.

The station is at 40 m above sea level and at kilometre post 342.950 of the Tours–Saint-Nazaire railway.

== History ==
The station was constructed beginning in 1848 and ultimately opened on 30 July 1849, along with the Saumur-Angers section of the Tours-Saint-Nazaire railway. In 1851 the line was completed from Angers westward to Nantes. The station gradually expanded as traffic grew in the latter half of the 19th century.

The station building was largely destroyed by bombing raids during the Second World War. A new one was opened in 1956, and ultimately renovated in 2001.

In 2014, the station was used by 5,284,928 travelers.

== Train services ==
The following services currently call at Angers-Saint-Laud:

- High speed services (TGV)
  - Nantes – Angers – Le Mans – Paris
  - Nantes – Angers – Le Mans – Aeroport CDG – Lille
  - Nantes – Angers – Tours / Le Mans – Lyon – Marseille
  - Nantes – Angers – Tours / Le Mans – Lyon – Montpellier
  - Nantes – Angers – Le Mans – Aeroport CDG – Strasbourg
  - Le Croisic – St Nazaire – Nantes – Angers – Paris
  - Les Sables-d'Olonne – Nantes – Angers – Paris
- Intercity services (Intercités)
  - Nantes – Tours – Bourges – Lyon
- Regional service (TER Pays de la Loire)
  - Nantes – Angers – Tours – Orleans
  - Nantes – Angers – Le Mans
- Local service (TER Pays de la Loire)
  - Nantes – Angers
  - Angers – Saumur – Tours
  - Angers – Cholet
- OUIGO Services
