= Cholet station =

Railway station in Cholet, France

Coordinates: 47°3′58″N 0°52′11″W

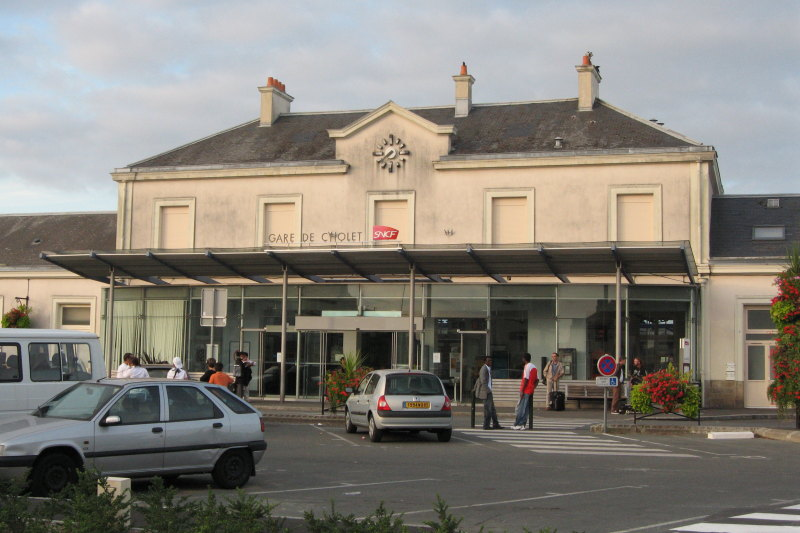
Cholet station

Gare de Cholet is a railway station serving the town Cholet, in the Maine-et-Loire department of western France. It is served by local trains (TER Pays de la Loire) to Angers, Clisson and Nantes.

Preceding station	TER Pays de la Loire	Following station
Torfou towards Nantes	6	Terminus
Chemillé towards Angers	20	Terminus
