= Les Sables-d'Olonne station =

Railway station in Les Sables-d'Olonne, France

Coordinates: 46°29′59″N 1°46′53″W

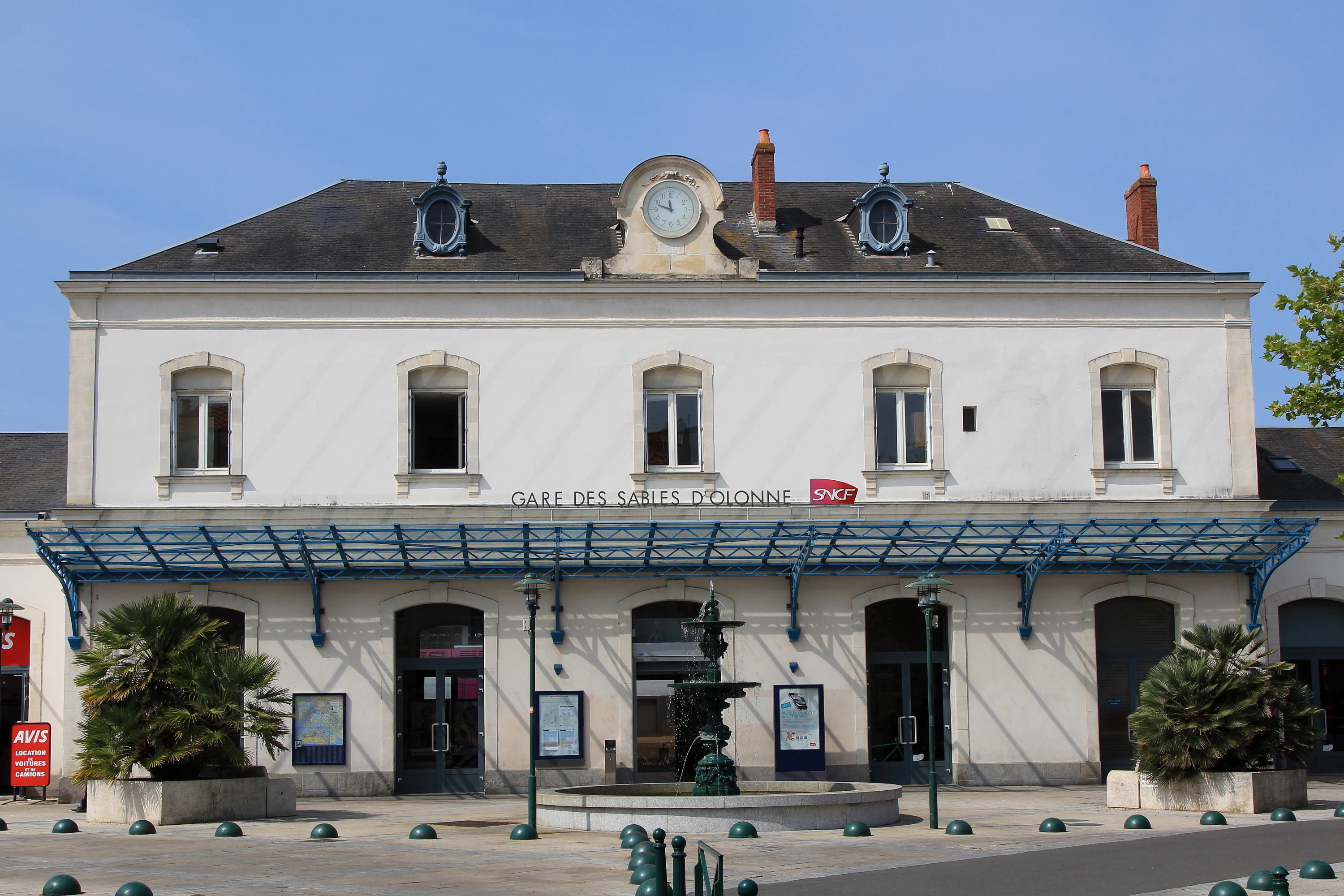
In 2013

Les Sables-d'Olonne station is a railway station serving the town Les Sables-d'Olonne, Vendée department, western France. The station is served by high speed trains to Paris and by regional trains towards La Roche-sur-Yon and Nantes.

Preceding station	SNCF	Following station
La Roche-sur-Yon towards Montparnasse	TGV	Terminus
Preceding station	TER Pays de la Loire	Following station
Olonne-sur-Mer towards Nantes	8	Terminus
