= Le Mans station =

Railway station in Le Mans, France

Le Mans
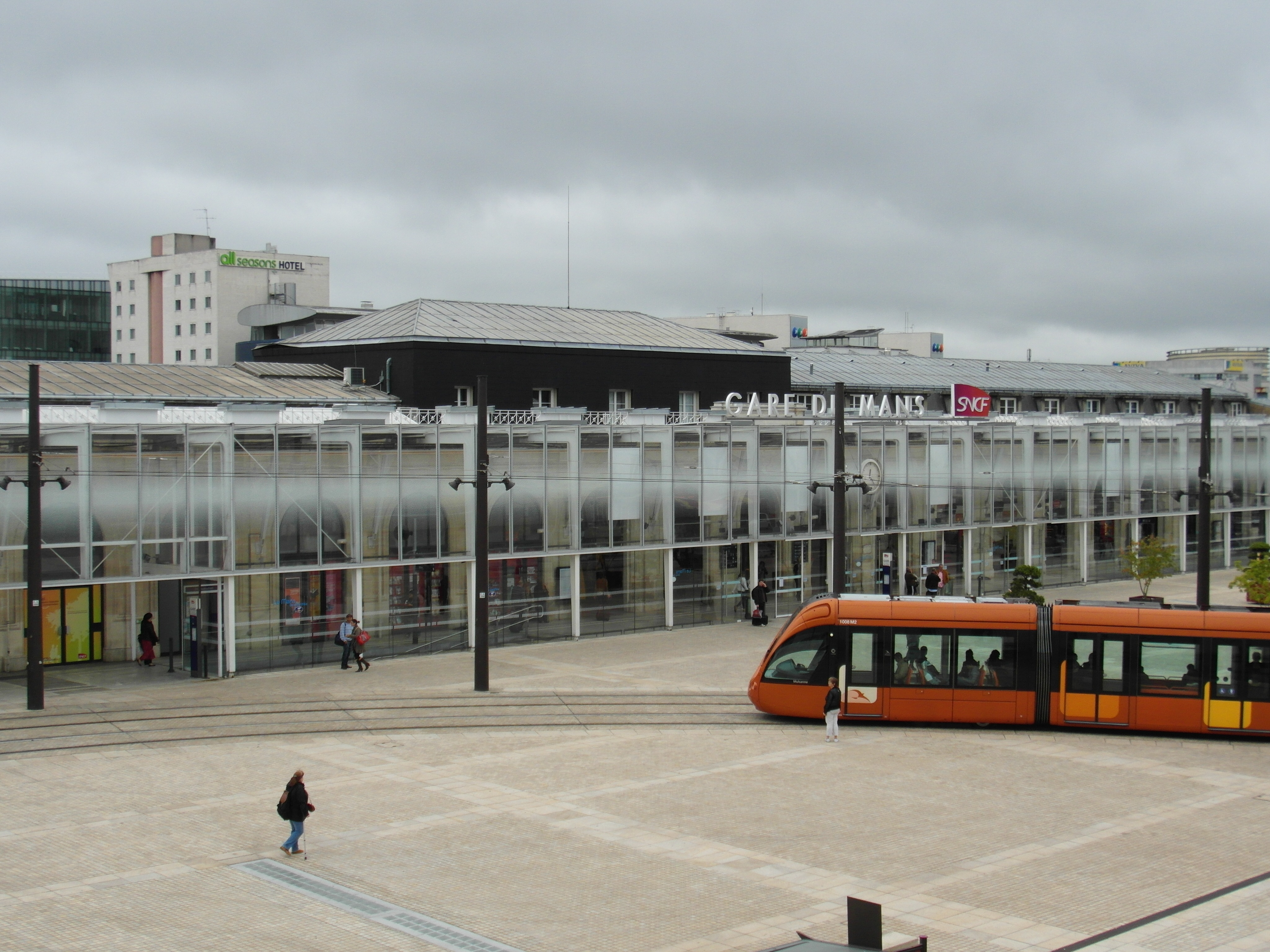

General information
- Location: France
- Coordinates: 47°59′44″N 0°11′33″E
- Elevation: 51 m (167 ft)
- Owner: SNCF
- Operator: SNCF
- Platforms: 4
- Tracks: 8

Other information
- Station code: 87396002

History
- Opened: 1 June 1854

Passengers
- 2024: 5,440,432
Services
Preceding station	SNCF	Following station
Laval towards Rennes	TGV inOui	Montparnasse Terminus
Angers-Saint-Laud towards Nantes	TGV inOui	Massy TGV towards Montparnasse
Nantes Terminus	TGV inOui	Montparnasse Terminus
Preceding station	TER Normandie	Following station
Montbizot towards Caen	Krono	Terminus
Neuville-sur-Sarthe towards Alençon	Proxi	Terminus
Preceding station	TER Pays de la Loire	Following station
Voivres towards Nantes	21	Terminus
Domfront-en-Champagne towards Laval	22	Terminus
Terminus	23	Champagné towards Nogent-le-Rotrou
Terminus	25	Arnage towards Tours
Preceding station	Le Réseau Rémi	Following station
Terminus	3.2	Connerré-Beillé towards Paris-Montparnasse
Preceding station	Ouigo	Following station
Massy TGV towards Paris-Montparnasse	Grande Vitesse	Angers-Saint-Laud towards Nantes
Chartres towards Paris-Austerlitz	Train Classique	Angers-Saint-Laud towards Nantes
Location

Le Mans (French: Gare du Mans) is a railway station serving the town Le Mans, Sarthe department, western France. It is situated on the Paris–Brest railway, Le Mans–Angers railway and the non-electrified Tours–Le Mans railway.

== Services ==
The following services call at Le Mans:

- regional services (TER Centre-Val de Loire) Paris - Chartres - Le Mans
- regional services (TER Pays de la Loire) Nantes - Angers - Sablé-sur-Sarthe - Le Mans
- local services (TER Pays de la Loire) Laval - Le Mans
- local services (TER Pays de la Loire) Le Mans - Nogent-le-Rotrou
- local services (TER Pays de la Loire) Le Mans - Nogent-le-Rotrou
- local services (TER Normandie) Le Mans - Château-sur-Loir - Tours

== Intermodality ==
The station is connected with T1 and T2 tramways, and with T3, 13, 14, 16, 30, 32, 34 et 35 local bus from SETRAM network.

The station is also connected with 26, 206, 207, 208, 209, 210, 211, 212, 214, 215, 216, 217, 218 and 219 regional Aléop bus.
