= Saint-Gilles-Croix-de-Vie station =

Railway station in Saint-Gilles-Croix-de-Vie, France

Saint-Gilles-Croix-de-Vie
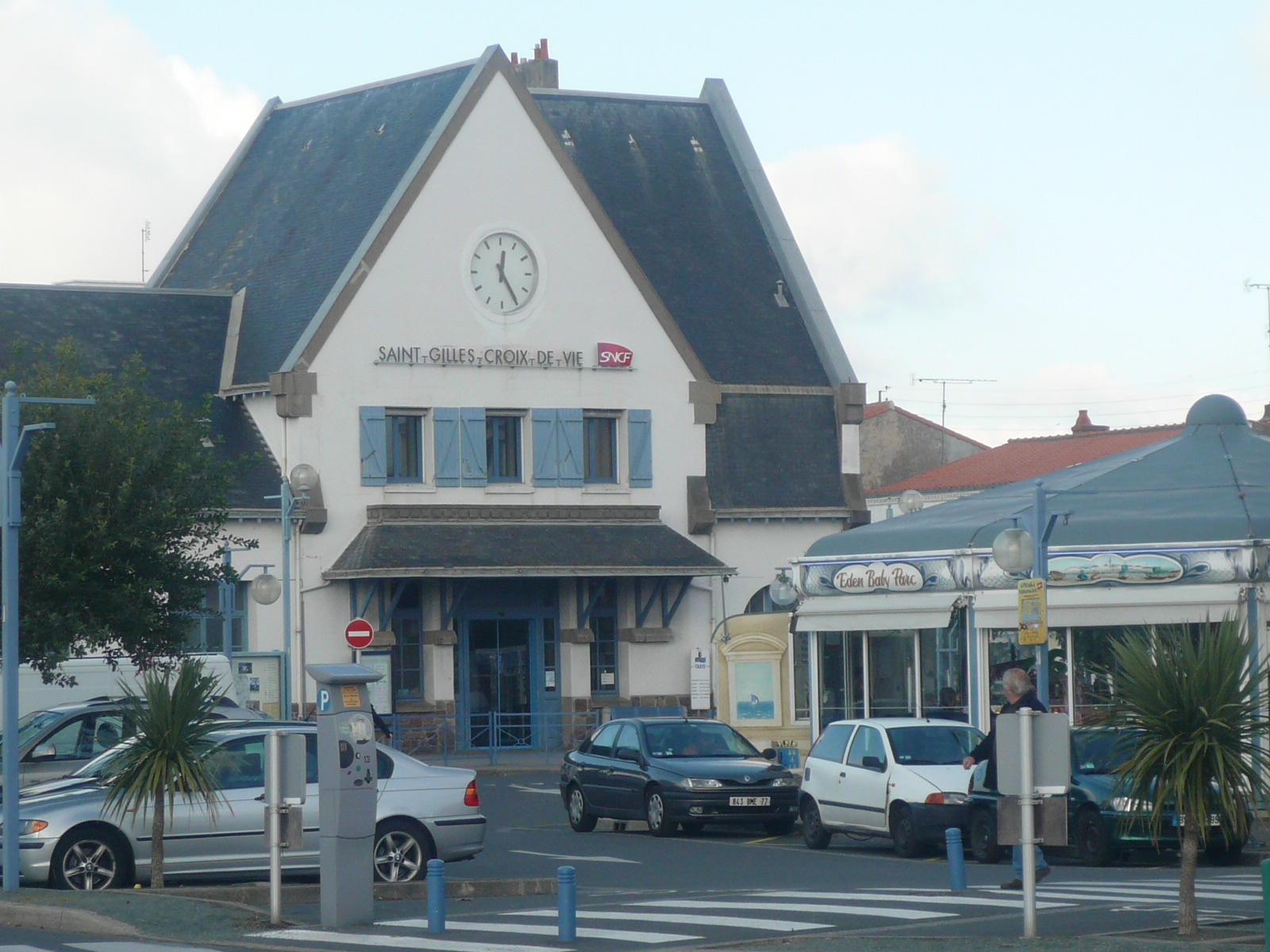
- Saint-Gilles-Croix-de-Vie railway station

General information
- Location: Saint-Gilles-Croix-de-Vie, Vendée; Pays de la Loire, France
- Coordinates: 46°41′47″N 1°56′29″W
- Line: Commequiers–Saint-Gilles-Croix-de-Vie railway
- Platforms: 3
- Tracks: 3

Other information
- Station code: 87486571

History
- Opened: 1881

Services
Preceding station	TER Pays de la Loire	Following station
Saint-Hilaire-de-Riez towards Nantes	11	Terminus
Location

Saint-Gilles-Croix-de-Vie is a railway station in Saint-Gilles-Croix-de-Vie, Pays de la Loire, France. The station is located on the Commequiers–Saint-Gilles-Croix-de-Vie railway. The station is served by TER (local) services operated by the SNCF:

- local services (TER Pays de la Loire) Nantes - Sainte-Pazanne - Saint-Gilles-Croix-de-Vie
