= Pornic station =

Railway station in Pornic, France

Pornic
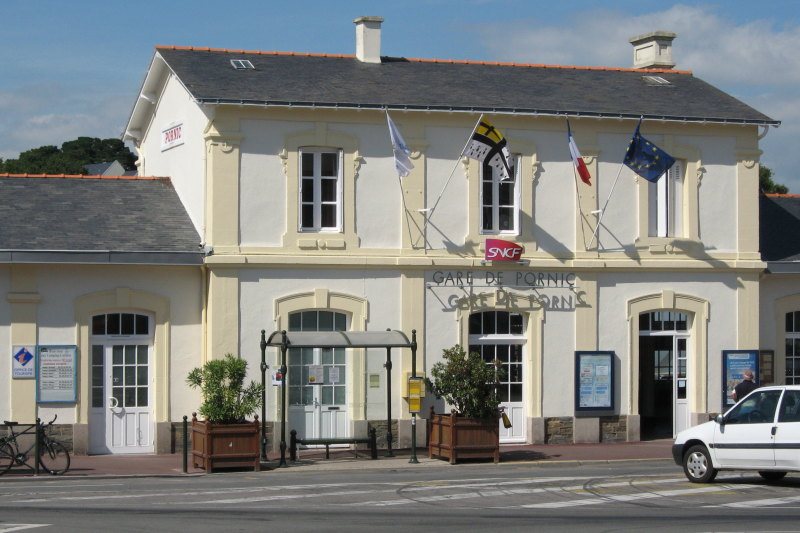
- Pornic railway station

General information
- Location: Pornic, Loire-Atlantique; Pays de la Loire, France
- Coordinates: 47°06′52″N 2°05′50″W
- Line: Sainte-Pazanne–Pornic railway
- Platforms: 2
- Tracks: 4

Other information
- Station code: 87481283

History
- Opened: 11 September 1875

Services
Preceding station	TER Pays de la Loire	Following station
La Bernerie-en-Retz towards Nantes	10	Terminus
Location

Pornic is a railway station in Pornic, Pays de la Loire, France. The station is located on the Sainte-Pazanne–Pornic railway. The station is served by TER (local) services operated by the SNCF:

- local services (TER Pays de la Loire) Nantes - Sainte-Pazanne - Pornic
