= TER Pays de la Loire =

Regional transport network in France

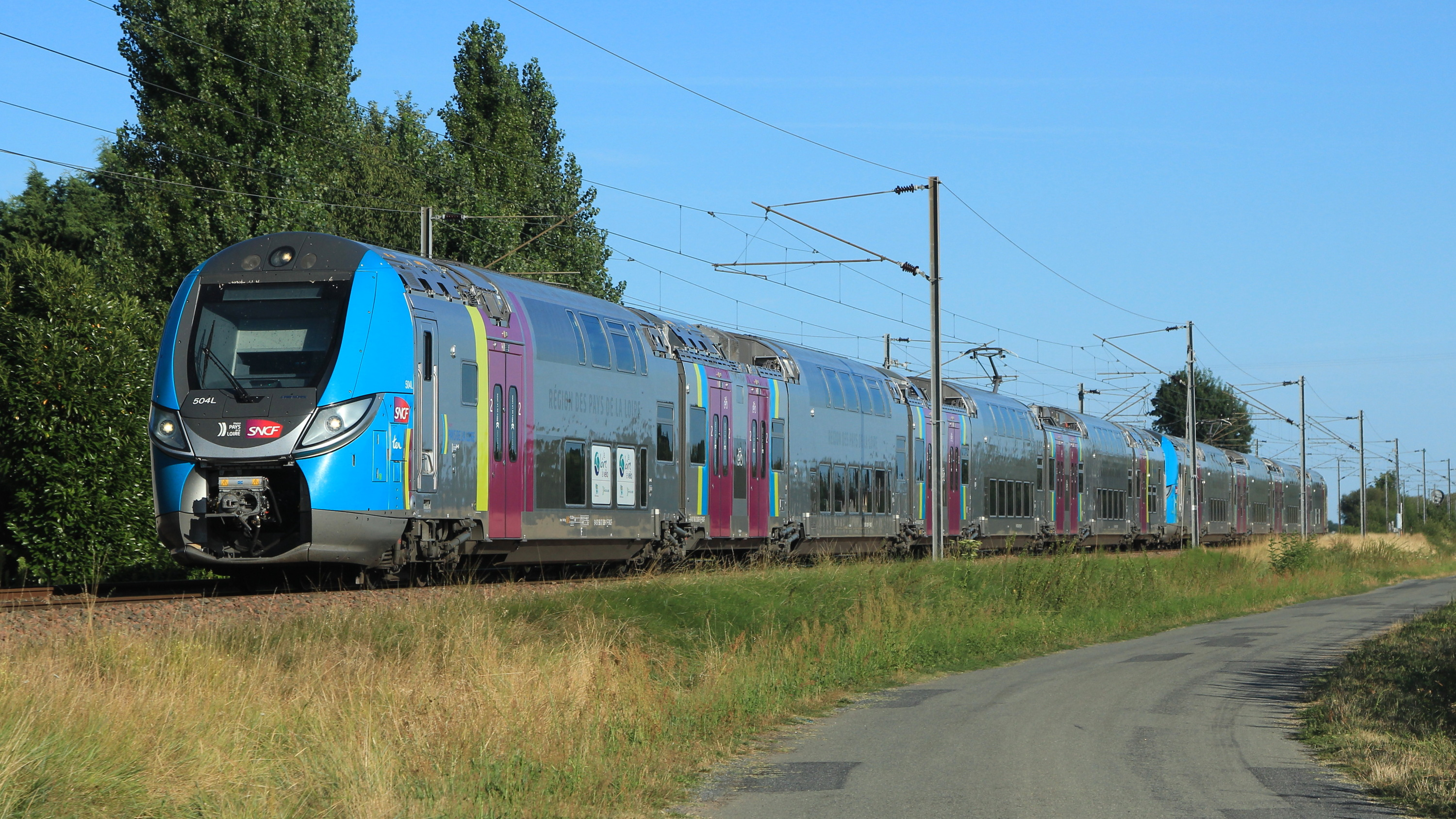
- Multiple-unit of Regio 2N near La Ménitré station.

Overview
- Owner: SNCF
- Area served: Pays de la Loire, France
- Number of lines: 17
- Number of stations: 123
- Daily ridership: 40 500
- Website: m.ter.sncf.com/pays-de-la-loire

Operation
- Began operation: 1986
- Operator: SNCF

Technical
- Track gauge: 1,435 mm (4 ft 8 1/2 in) standard gauge

TER Pays de la Loire is the regional rail network serving Pays de la Loire, France.

== TER Network ==
Rail transport infrastructure map of Pays de la Loire, showing main stations, number of tracks, power source and maximum speed.

The rail and bus network as of May 2022:

=== Train ===
Line	Route
1	Nantes - Savenay ... Saint-Nazaire ... Le Croisic
1bis	Nantes ... Couëron ... Savenay
2	Nantes – Savenay ... Redon direct service Nantes – Rennes
2bis	Nantes – Savenay ... Redon ... Lorient ... Quimper (see TER Bretagne line 3 for details)
4	Angers-Saint-Laud ... Ancenis – Nantes
5	Ancenis ... Nantes
6	Nantes – Clisson ... Cholet
8	Nantes – Clisson ... La Roche-sur-Yon ... Les Sables-d'Olonne
9	Nantes – La Roche-sur-Yon – Luçon – La Rochelle
10	Nantes ... Sainte-Pazanne ... Pornic
11	Nantes ... Sainte-Pazanne ... Challans ... Saint-Gilles-Croix-de-Vie
14	La Roche-sur-Yon ... Bressuire ... Thouars ... Saumur – Tours
19	Angers-Saint-Laud ... Saumur – Tours
20	Angers-Saint-Laud ... Cholet
21	Nantes ... Angers-Saint-Laud ... Sablé-sur-Sarthe ... Le Mans
22	Laval ... Le Mans
23	Le Mans ... Nogent-le-Rotrou (see TER Centre-Val de Loire line 3.2 for direct services from Le Mans to Paris via Nogent-le-Rotrou and Chartres)
24	Caen ... Alençon ... Le Mans (see TER Normandie for details)
25	Le Mans ... Château-du-Loir ... Tours
27	Rennes ... Vitré ... Laval
28	Nantes – Ancenis – Angers-Saint-Laud – Sablé-sur-Sarthe – Laval – Vitré – Rennes
T1	Nantes ... Nort-sur-Erdre ... Châteaubriant
T2	Nantes ... Vertou ... Clisson
† Not all trains call at this station

=== Bus ===
Line	Bus route
6	Nantes – Cholet
7	Nantes – Bressuire – Poitiers
11	Nantes – Challans – Saint-Gilles-Croix-de-Vie
12	Nantes – Challans – Saint-Jean-de-Monts
13	Nantes – Noirmoutier
15	La Roche-sur-Yon – Fontenay-le-Comte
16	Fontenay-le-Comte – Niort
17	Fontenay-le-Comte – La Rochelle
18	Angers – Châteaubriant
26	Le Mans – La Flèche – Saumur

== Rolling stock ==
=== Multiple units ===
- SNCF Class Z 9600
- SNCF Class Z 21500
- SNCF Class X 2100 Also called X 92100
- SNCF Class X 4300
- SNCF Class X 4630
- SNCF Class X 4750
- SNCF Class X 72500
- SNCF Class X 73500

=== Locomotives ===
- SNCF Class BB 22200
- SNCF Class BB 25500
- SNCF Class BB 26000
- SNCF Class BB 67300
- SNCF Class BB 67400

== See also ==
- SNCF
- Transport express régional
- Réseau Ferré de France
- List of SNCF stations in Pays de la Loire
