= Nantes station =

Railway station in Nantes, France

Nantes
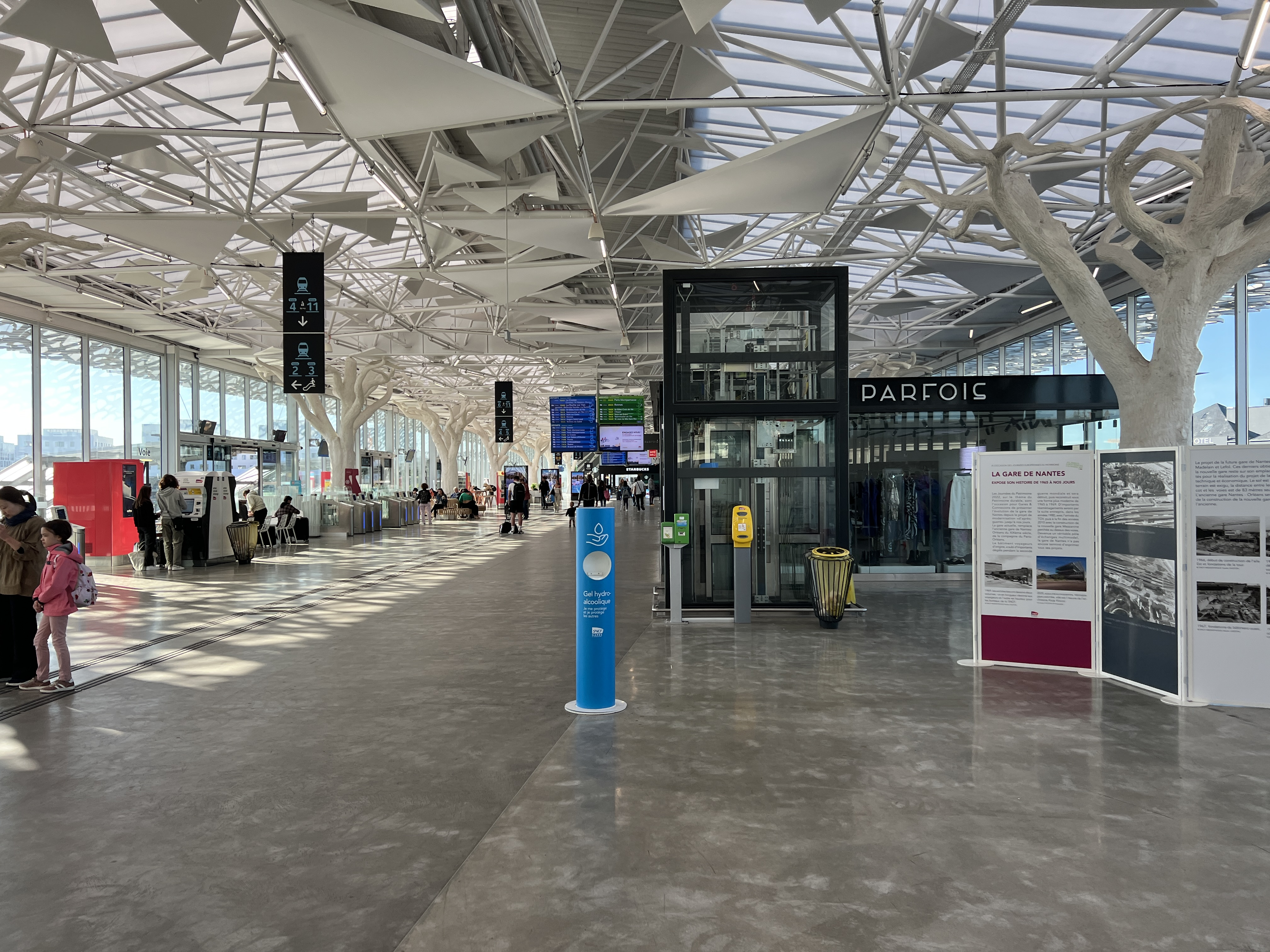
- Mezzanine level, in 2022

General information
- Location: 27, boulevard de Stalingrad; BP 34112; 44041 Nantes cedex 1
- Coordinates: 47°13′0″N 1°32′30″W
- Owner: SNCF
- Line: Tours–Saint-Nazaire railway
- Platforms: 9
- Tracks: 14 (11 through; 3 terminus)

Construction
- Platform levels: 1

Other information
- Station code: 87481002; QJZ (IATA)

History
- Opened: 1968
- Electrified: 25 kV AC

Passengers
- 2024: 17,553,626
Services
Preceding station	SNCF	Following station
Angers-Saint-Laud towards Montparnasse	TGV inOui	Terminus
Angers-Saint-Laud towards Eastern France	TGV inOui	Terminus
Le Mans towards Montparnasse	TGV inOui	Terminus
Preceding station	Ouigo	Following station
Angers-Saint-Laud towards Paris-Montparnasse	Grande Vitesse	Terminus
Angers-Saint-Laud towards Paris-Austerlitz	Train Classique	Terminus
Preceding station	SNCF	Following station
Terminus	Intercités	La Roche-sur-Yon towards Bordeaux
Terminus	Intercités	Angers-Saint-Laud towards Lyon-Perrache
Preceding station	TER Bretagne	Following station
Savenay towards Quimper	3	Terminus
Preceding station	TER Pays de la Loire	Following station
Couëron towards Le Croisic	1	Terminus
Chantenay towards Savenay	1bis	Terminus
Savenay towards Redon	2	Terminus
Rennes Terminus	2	Terminus
Terminus	4	Ancenis towards Angers
Terminus	5	Thouaré-sur-Loire towards Ancenis
Terminus	6	Clisson towards Cholet
Terminus	8	Clisson towards Les Sables-d'Olonne
Terminus	9	La Roche-sur-Yon towards La Rochelle
Terminus	10	Rezé-Pont-Rousseau towards Pornic
Terminus	11	Rezé-Pont-Rousseau towards Saint-Gilles-Croix-de-Vie
Terminus	21	Ancenis towards Le Mans
Terminus	28	Ancenis towards Rennes
Haluchère-Batignolles towards Châteaubriant	T1	Terminus
Terminus	T2	Saint-Sébastien-Pas-Enchantés towards Clisson
Preceding station	Le Réseau Rémi	Following station
Terminus	2.6	Ancenis towards Orléans
Location

Nantes station (French: Gare de Nantes) is the principal passenger railway station serving the French city of Nantes. It is a through station aligned east–west, with entrances and station facilities on both north and south sides. The two entrances are often described as Gare Nord and Gare Sud, as if they were separate stations, but they are in fact linked to each other and to all the platforms by a pedestrian subway. In 2020, after 3 years of work, a new pedestrian aerial way has been built over the railways to facilitate the passengers flow.

Construction was started on the current station in 1965, and it was placed into service three years later. It is situated somewhat to the east of the old Gare d'Orléans, originally the Nantes station of the Chemin de Fer de Paris à Orléans, which it replaced. The southern entrance hall was opened in 1989, in time for the inauguration of the TGV Atlantique. For years, major changes have extended the station capacity to ease the users journeys. The first major step was done in 2020 with the addition of the new aerial way, part of a more global transformation project which should end in 2025, with a complete restructuration of the station area.

Line 1 of the Tramway de Nantes serves the northern hall of the station. The southern hall is served by several of the bus services of the Tan network, including the Navette Tan Air express shuttle service to Nantes Atlantique Airport. All platforms at train station Nantes have elevators and escalators to help people with limited mobility.

== Train services ==
The station is served by the following service(s):

=== High speed services ===
- High speed services (TGV) Nantes - Angers - Le Mans - Paris
- High speed services (TGV) Le Croisic - Saint-Nazaire - Nantes - Paris
- High speed services (TGV) Nantes - Le Mans - Massy - Lyon - Marseille / Montpellier
- High speed services (TGV) Nantes - Le Mans - Massy - Strasbourg / Lille

=== Intercity and regional services ===
- Intercity services (Intercités) Nantes - La Rochelle - Bordeaux
- Intercity services (Intercités) Nantes - Tours - Bourges - Lyon
- Regional services (TER Bretagne) Quimper - Lorient - Vannes - Redon - Nantes
- Regional services (Interloire) Le Croisic - Saint-Nazaire - Nantes - Angers - Saint-Pierre-des-Corps - Orleans
- Regional services (TER Pays de la Loire) Rennes - Nantes
- Regional services (TER Pays de la Loire) Redon - Nantes
- Regional services (TER Pays de la Loire) Le Croisic - Saint-Nazaire - Nantes
- Regional services (TER Pays de la Loire) Nantes - Angers - Le Mans
- Regional services (TER Pays de la Loire) Nantes - Ancenis
- Regional services (TER Pays de la Loire) Nantes - Clisson - La Roche-sur-Yon - Les Sables-d'Olonne
- Regional services (TER Pays de la Loire) Nantes - Sainte-Pazanne - Pornic
- Regional services (TER Pays de la Loire) Nantes - Sainte-Pazanne - Saint-Gilles-Croix-de-Vie

=== Local services ===
- Tram - Train services (TER Pays de la Loire) Nantes - Clisson - Cholet
- Tram - Train services (TER Pays de la Loire) Nantes - La Chapelle - Châteaubriant
