= List of SNCF stations in Brittany =

This article contains a list of current SNCF railway stations in the Brittany region of France.

== Côtes-d'Armor (22) ==
- Belle-Isle-Bégard
- Brélidy-Plouëc
- Broons
- Callac
- Carnoët-Locarn
- Caulnes
- Châtelaudren-Plouagat
- Coat-Guégan
- Corseul-Languenan
- Dinan
- Frynaudour
- Gourland
- Guingamp
- La Hisse
- Lamballe
- Lancerf
- Landébia
- Lannion
- Les Mais
- La Méaugon
- Moustéru
- Paimpol
- Le Pénity
- Plancoët
- Plénée-Jugon
- Plestan
- Pleudihen
- Plouaret-Trégor
- Plougonver
- Plounérin
- Plouvara-Plerneuf
- Pont-Melvez
- Pontrieux
- Pontrieux (Halte)
- Saint-Brieuc
- Traou-Nez
- Trégonneau-Squiffiec
- Yffiniac

== Finistère (29) ==
- Bannalec
- Brest
- Carhaix
- Châteaulin
- Dirinon-Loperhet
- La Forest
- Guimiliau
- Landerneau
- Landivisiau
- Morlaix
- Pleyber-Christ
- Plouigneau
- Pont-de-Buis
- Quimper
- Quimperlé
- La Roche-Maurice
- Roscoff
- Rosporden
- Saint-Pol-de-Léon
- Saint-Thégonnec

== Ille-et-Vilaine (35) ==
- Betton
- Bonnemain
- Breteil
- La Brohinière
- Bruz
- Cesson-Sévigné
- Châteaubourg
- Chevaigné
- Combourg
- Corps-Nuds
- Dingé
- Dol-de-Bretagne
- Fougeray-Langon
- La Fresnais
- La Gouesnière-Cancale
- Guichen-Bourg-des-Comptes
- L'Hermitage-Mordelles
- Janzé
- Ker-Lann
- Les Lacs
- Laillé
- Martigné-Ferchaud
- Messac-Guipry
- Miniac
- Montauban-de-Bretagne
- Montfort-sur-Meu
- Montreuil-sur-Ille
- Noyal-Acigne
- Pléchatel
- Plerguer
- Quédillac
- Redon
- Rennes
- Rennes-Pontchaillou
- Rennes-La Poterie
- Retiers
- Saint-Armel
- Saint-Germain-sur-Ille
- Saint-Jacques-de-la-Lande
- Saint-Malo
- Saint-Médard-sur-Ille
- Saint-Senoux-Pléchatel
- Servon
- Le Theil-de-Bretagne
- Vern
- Vitré

== Morbihan (56) ==
- Auray
- Belz-Ploemel
- Brandérion
- Gestel
- Hennebont
- L'Isthme
- Kerhostin
- Landaul-Mendon
- Landévant
- Lorient
- Malansac
- Penthièvre
- Plouharnel-Carnac
- Questembert
- Quiberon
- Les Sables-Blancs
- Sainte-Anne
- Saint-Pierre-Quiberon
- Vannes

== See also ==
- SNCF
- List of SNCF stations for SNCF stations in other regions
