= List of TGV stations =

These are all the TGV (French: train à grande vitesse, meaning high-speed train) stations, listed alphabetically. This list includes new stations constructed specifically for the TGV as well as existing stations that are simply served by the trains.

Stations located in countries other than France are marked with the country in parentheses.

== A ==
Avignon TGV

- Aachen Hauptbahnhof (Germany)
- Aéroport Charles de Gaulle 2 TGV
- Agde
- Agen
- Aime-La Plagne
- Aix-en-Provence TGV
- Aix-les-Bains-Le Revard
- Albertville
- Amiens
- Amsterdam Centraal station (Netherlands)
- Angers-Saint-Laud
- Angoulême
- Annecy
- Annemasse
- Antibes
- Antwerpen-Centraal railway station (Belgium)
- Arcachon
- Les Arcs-Draguignan
- Arles
- Arras
- Augsburg Hauptbahnhof (Germany)
- Auray
- Avignon-Centre
- Avignon TGV

== B ==
- Baden-Baden station (Germany)
- Barcelona Sants railway station (Spain)
- Bardonecchia (Italy)
- Basel SBB railway station (Switzerland)
- La Baule
- Bayonne
- Beaune
- Belfort – Montbéliard TGV
- Bellegarde
- Besançon Franche-Comté TGV
- Besançon-Viotte
- Béthune
- Béziers
- Biarritz
- Biganos-Facture
- Bordeaux-Saint-Jean
- Boulogne-sur-Mer
- Bourg-en-Bresse
- Bourg-Saint-Maurice
- Brest
- Brussels-South railway station (Belgium)

== C ==
- Calais-Fréthun
- Calais-Ville
- Cannes
- Carcassonne
- Chalon-sur-Saône
- Châteauroux
- Chambéry-Challes-les-Eaux
- Champagne-Ardenne TGV
- Châtellerault
- Colmar
- Cologne Hauptbahnhof (Germany)
- Le Creusot TGV
- Le Croisic
- Croix-Wasquehal
- Culoz

== D ==
- Dax
- Dijon-Ville
- Dol-de-Bretagne
- Dole-Ville
- Douai
- Duisburg Hauptbahnhof (Germany)
- Dunkerque
- Dortmund Hauptbahnhof (Germany)
- Düsseldorf Airport station (Germany)
- Düsseldorf Hauptbahnhof (Germany)

== E ==
- Épinal
- Gare d'Épernay
- Essen Hauptbahnhof (Germany)
- Évian-les-Bains

== F ==
- Figueres–Vilafant (Spain)
- Forbach
- Frankfurt (Main) Hauptbahnhof (Germany)
- Frasne
- Freiburg Hauptbahnhof (Germany)
- Futuroscope

== G ==
- Genève-Cornavin (Switzerland)
- Girona railway station (Spain)
- Grenoble
- Guingamp

== H ==
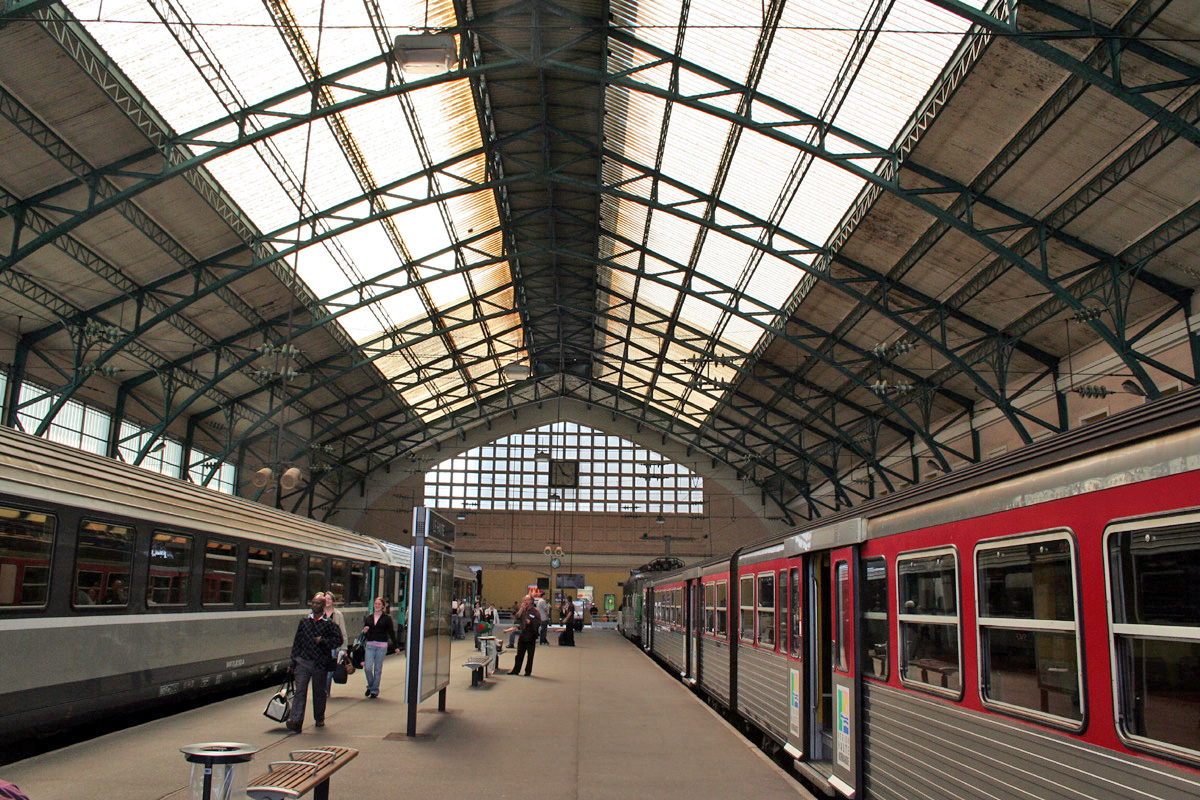
Le Havre

- TGV Haute-Picardie
- Le Havre
- Hazebrouck
- Hyères

== K ==
- Kaiserslautern Hauptbahnhof (Germany)
- Karlsruhe Hauptbahnhof (Germany)

== L ==
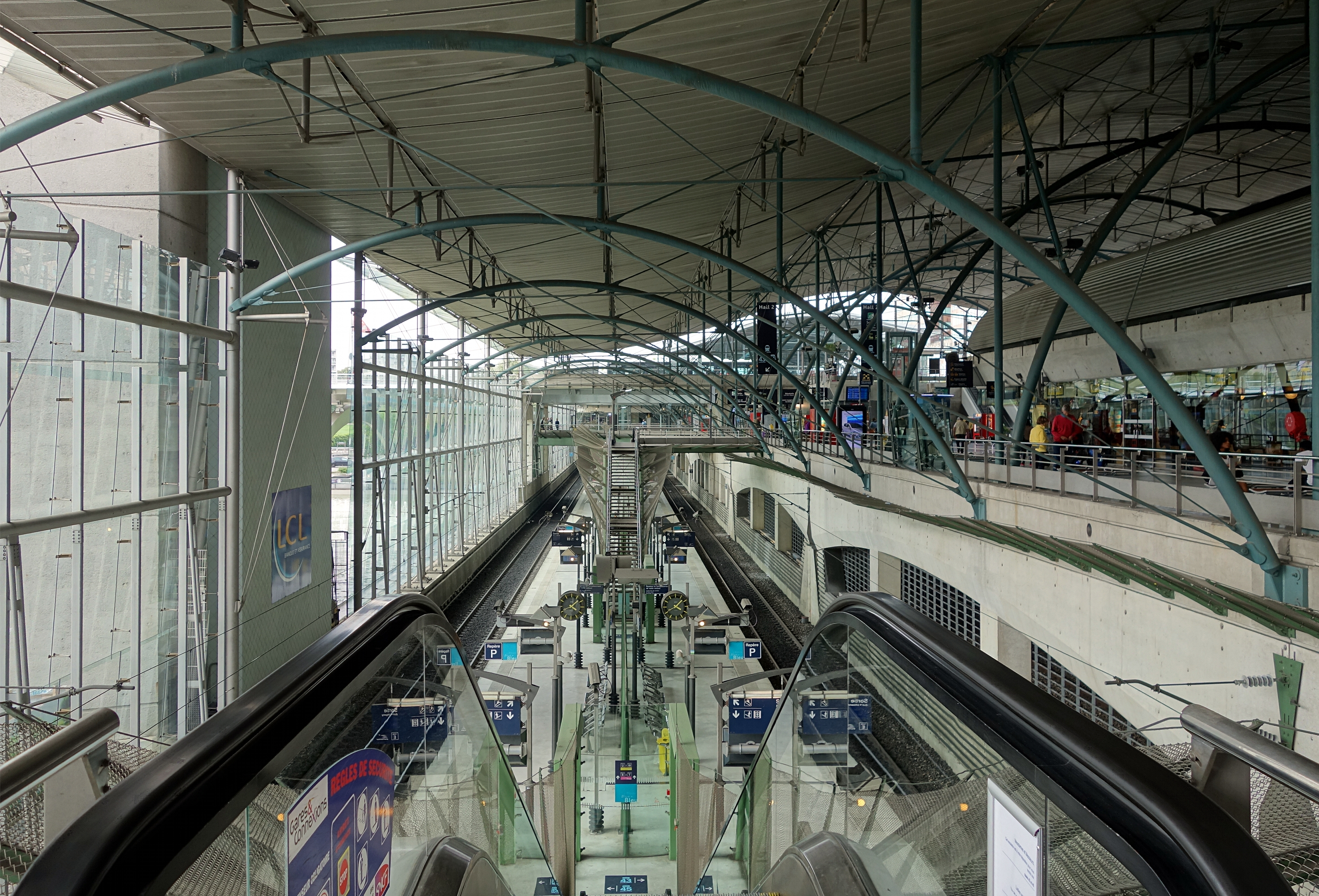
Lille-Europe station

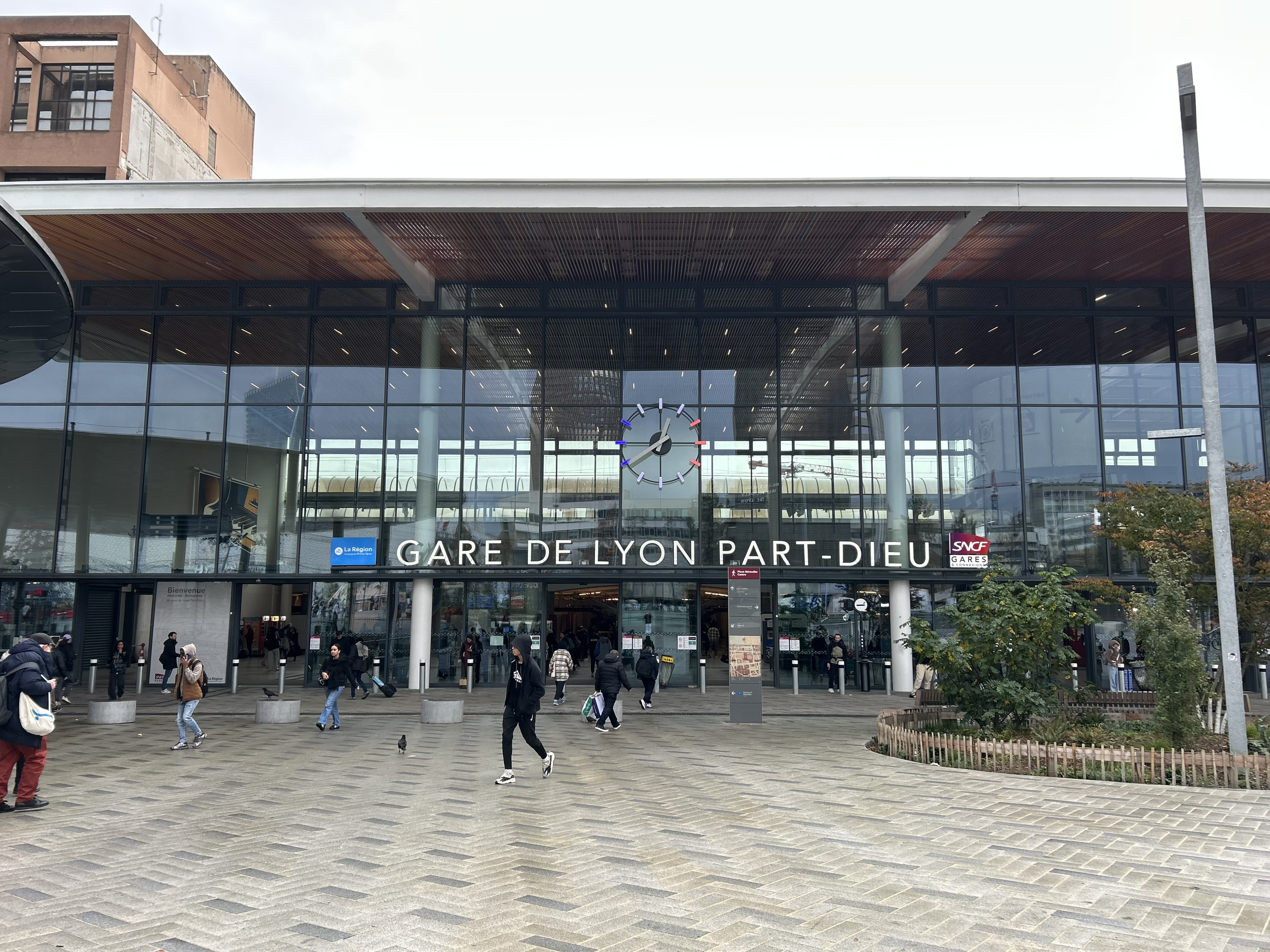
Entrance to Lyon-Part-Dieu station

- Lahr (Schwarzw) (Germany)
- Lamballe
- Landerneau
- Landry
- Lannion
- Lausanne railway station (Switzerland)
- Laval
- Lens
- Libourne
- Gare de Liège-Guillemins (Belgium)
- Lille-Europe
- Lille-Flandres
- London-St Pancras railway station (England)
- Lorient
- Lorraine TGV
- Lourdes
- Luxembourg railway station (Luxembourg)
- Lyon-Part-Dieu
- Lyon-Perrache
- Lyon-Saint-Exupéry TGV

== M ==
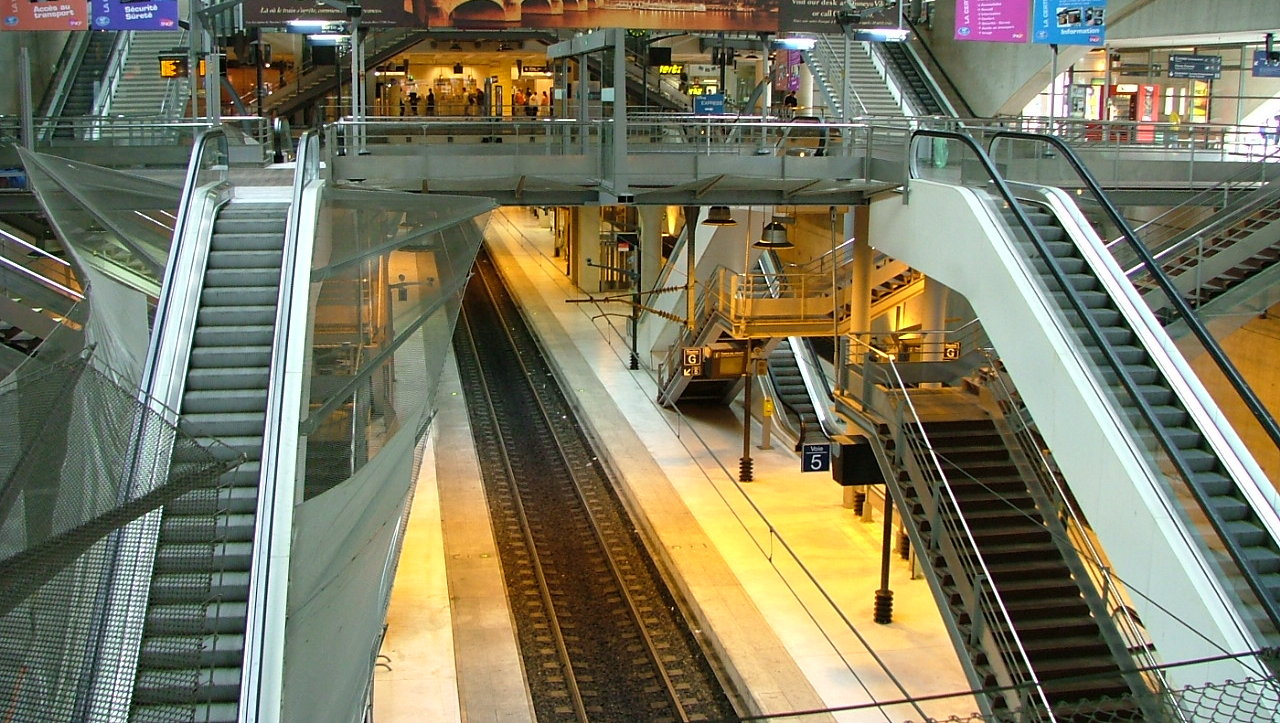
Platforms of Marne-la-Vallée–Chessy station

- Mâcon-Ville
- Mâcon-Loché TGV
- Mannheim Hauptbahnhof (Germany)
- Le Mans
- Mantes-la-Jolie
- Marne-la-Vallée–Chessy TGV
- Marseille-Saint-Charles
- Massy TGV
- Metz-Ville
- Meuse TGV
- Milano Porta Garibaldi railway station (Italy)
- Miramas
- Modane
- Montauban-Ville-Bourbon
- Montbard
- Montpellier-Saint-Roch
- Montpellier Sud de France
- Morlaix
- Mouchard
- Moûtiers-Salins-Brides-les-Bains
- Mulhouse-Ville
- München Hauptbahnhof (Germany)

== N ==
Nice-Ville

- Nancy-Ville
- Nantes
- Narbonne
- Nice-Ville
- Niort
- Nîmes
- Nîmes-Pont-du-Gard
- Nurieux

== O ==
- Offenburg (Germany)
- Orange
- Oulx-Cesana-Claviere (Italy)

== P ==
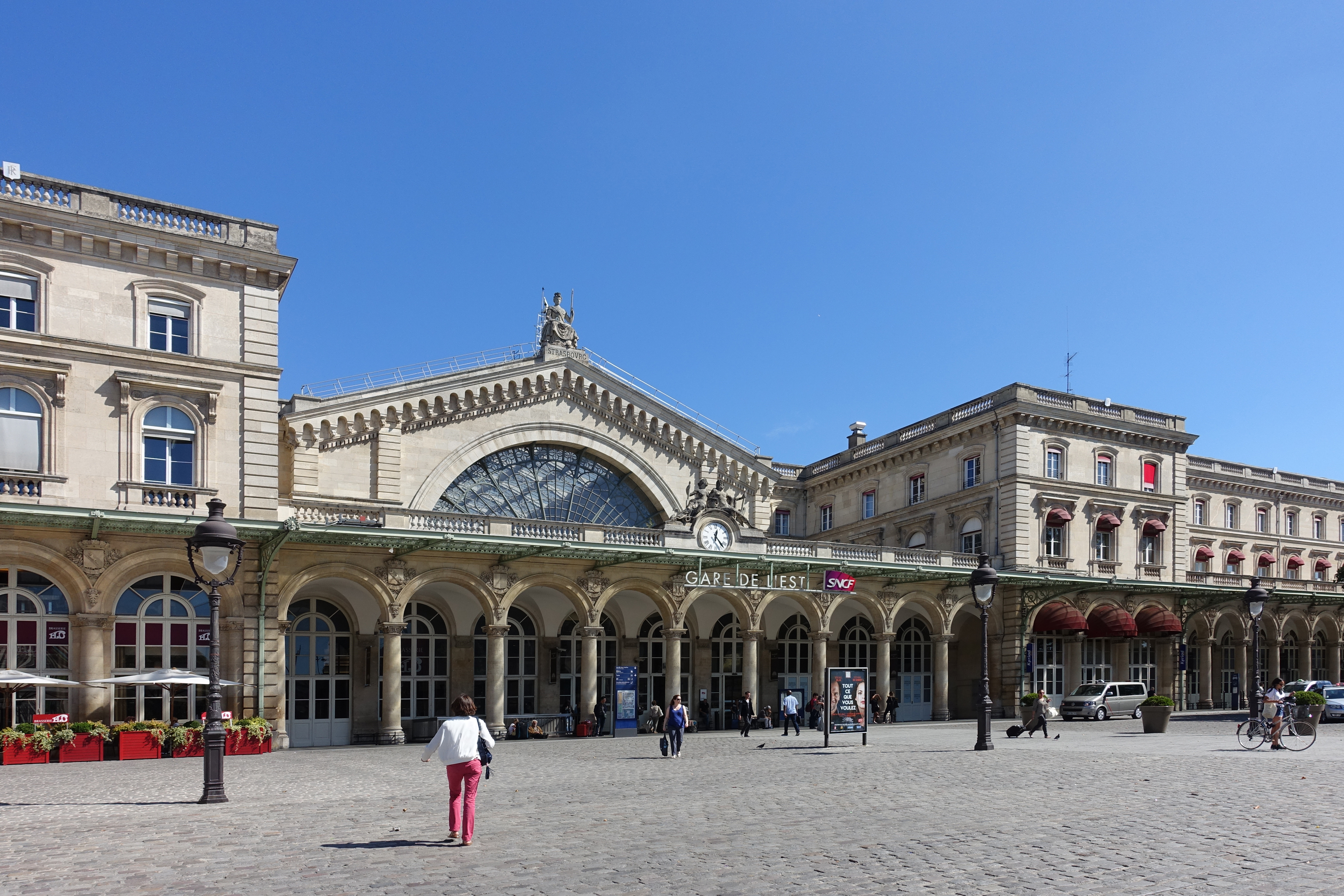
Façade of l'Est, Paris

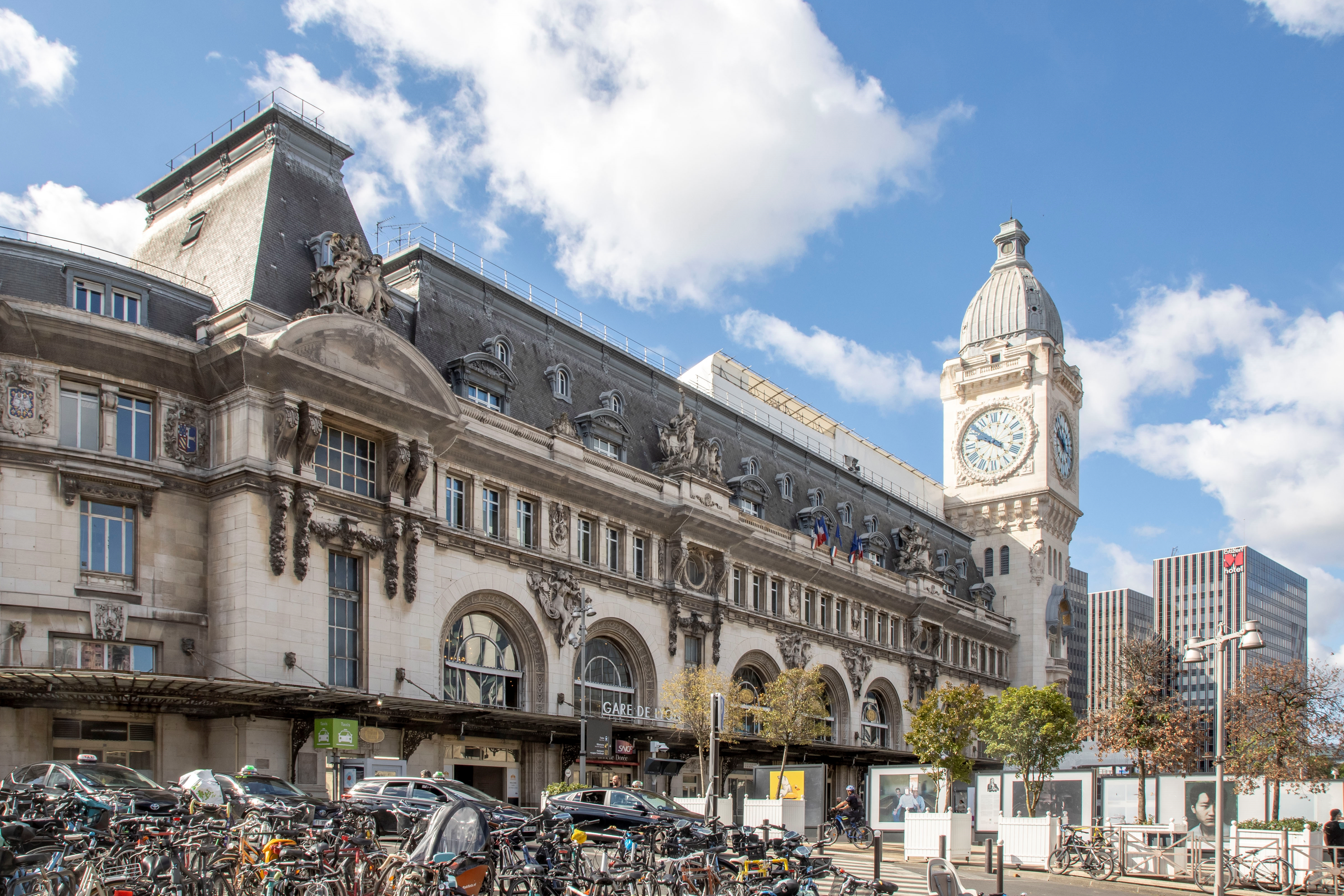
Façade of Gare de Lyon, Paris

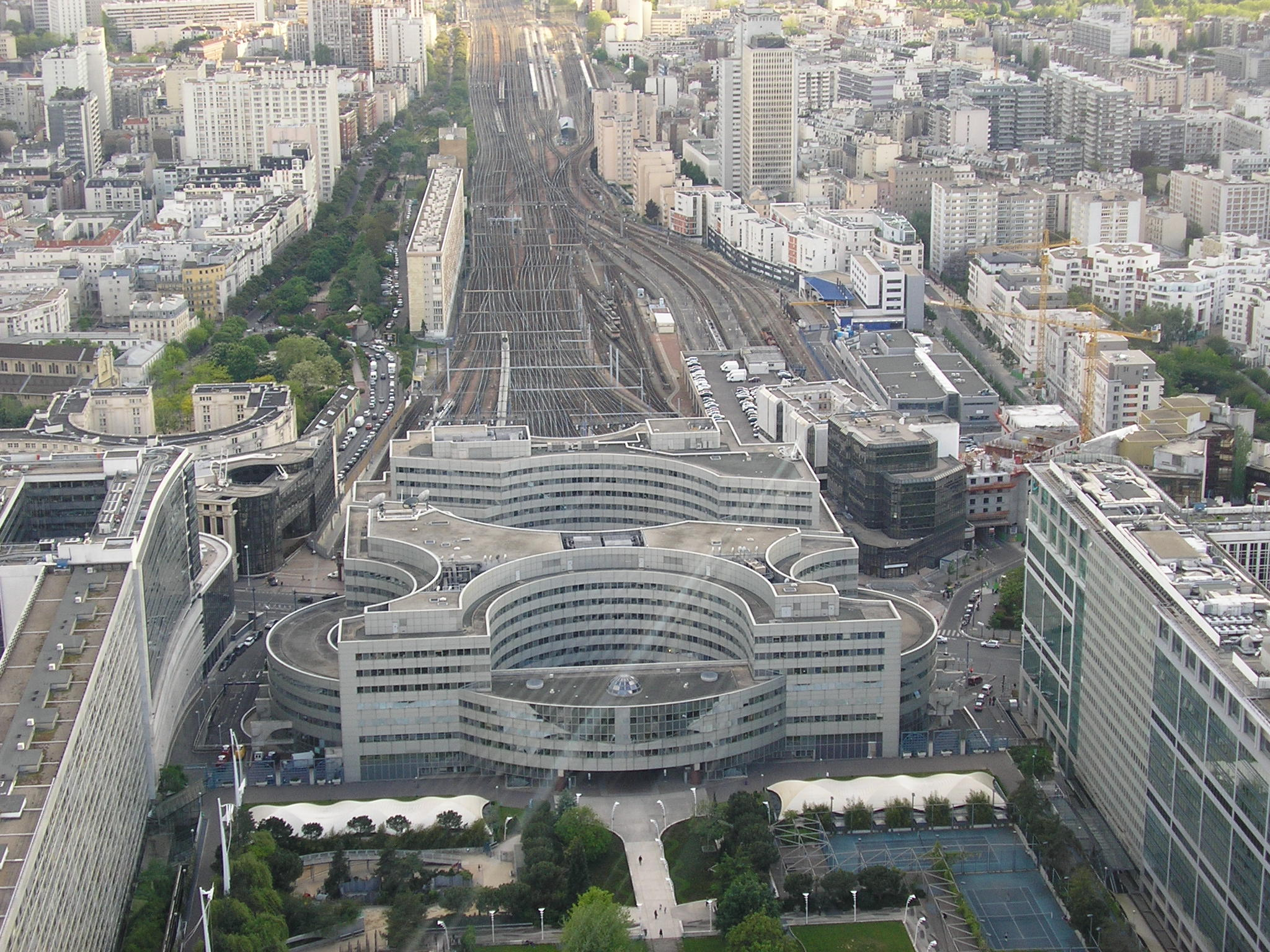
Aerial view of Gare Montparnasse from Tour Montparnasse

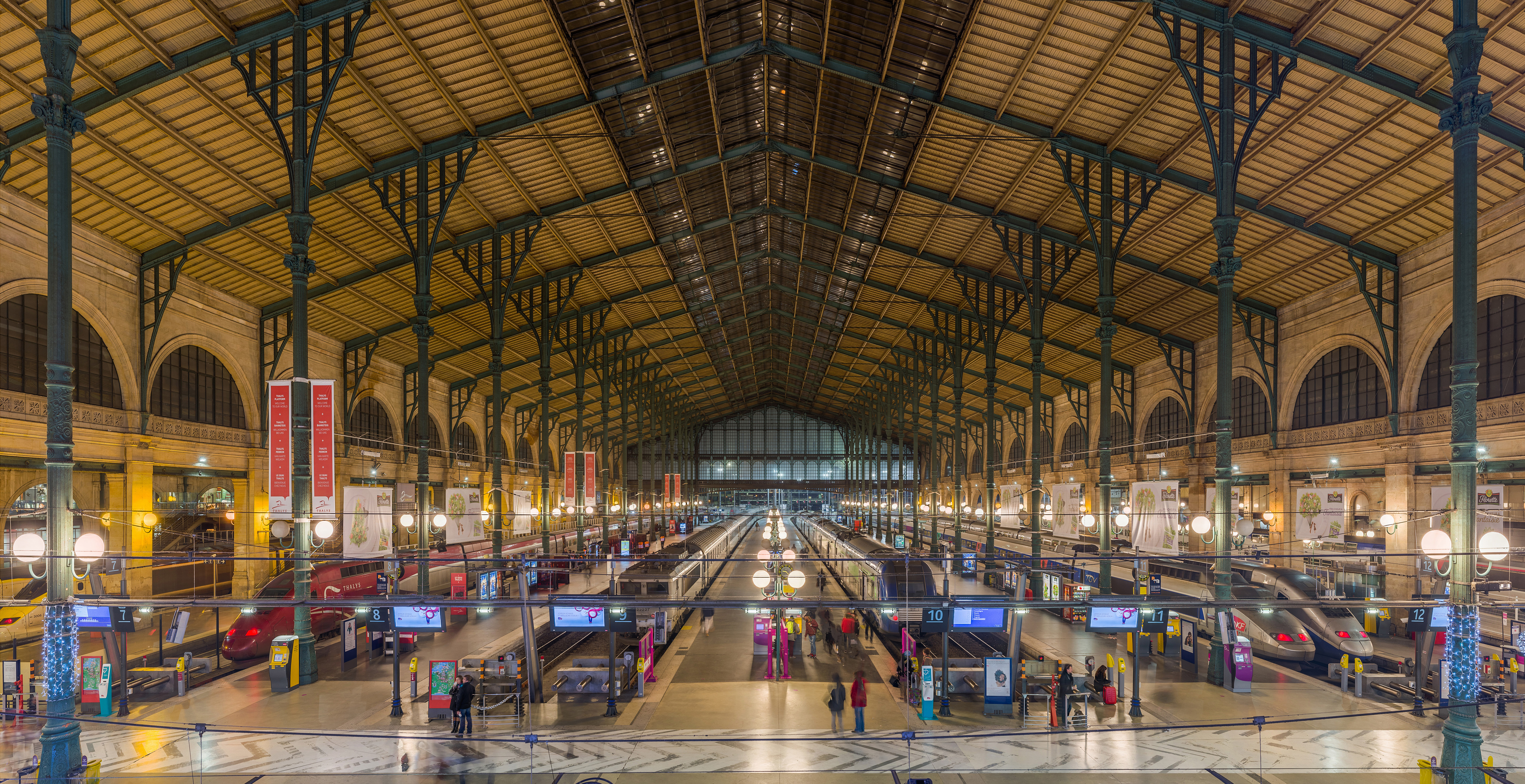
Inside Gare du Nord, Paris

- Paris-Est
- Paris-Lyon
- Paris-Montparnasse
- Paris-Nord
- Pau
- Perpignan
- Plouaret-Trégor
- Poitiers
- Pornichet
- Le Pouliguen

== Q ==
- Quimper
- Quimperlé

== R ==
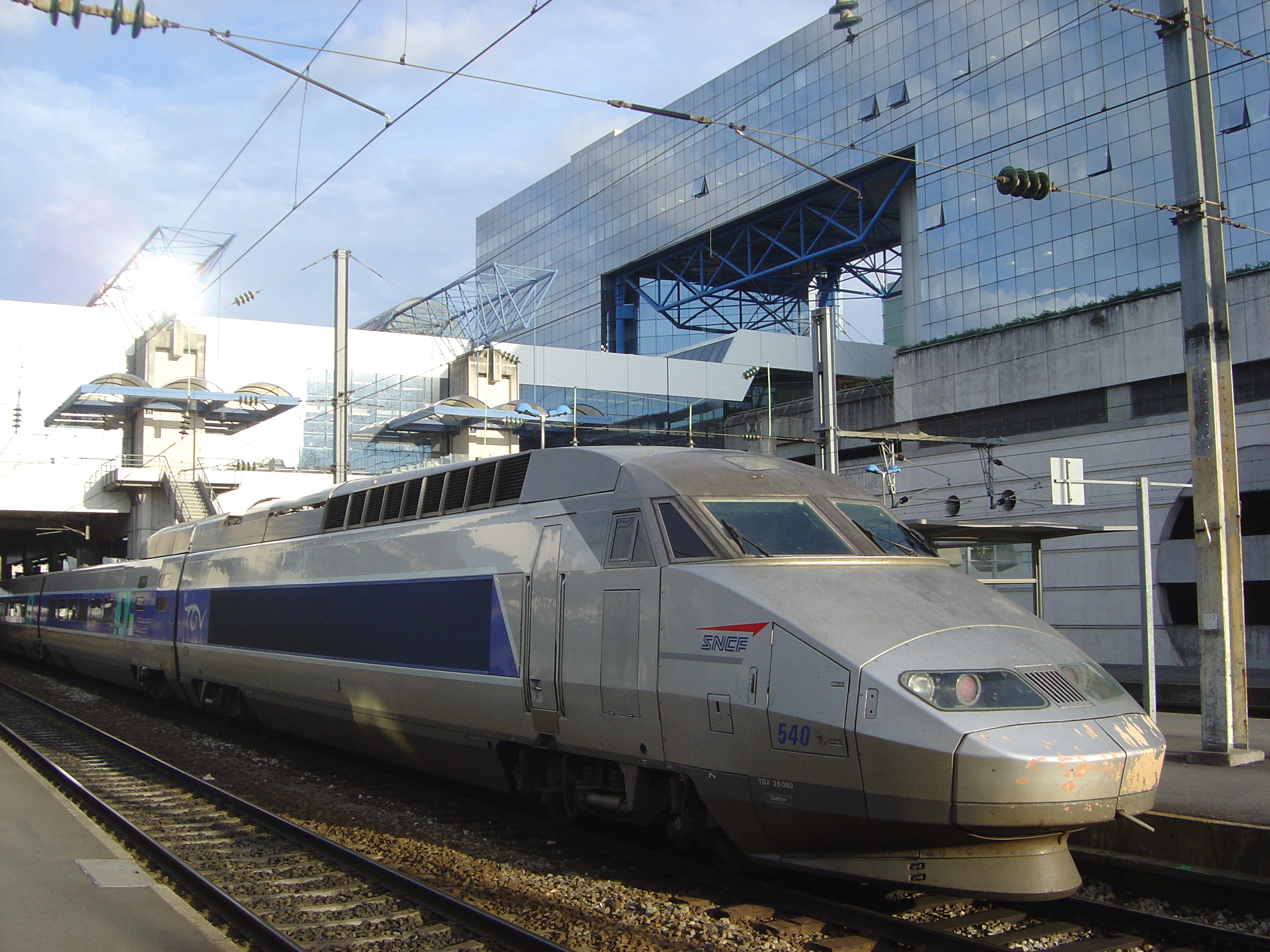
TGV train at Rennes

- Redon
- Reims
- Remiremont
- Rennes
- Ringsheim/Europa-Park (Germany)
- La Rochelle
- La Roche-sur-Yon
- Rotterdam Centraal station (Netherlands)
- Rosporden
- Roubaix
- Rouen-Rive-Droite
- Ruffec

== S ==
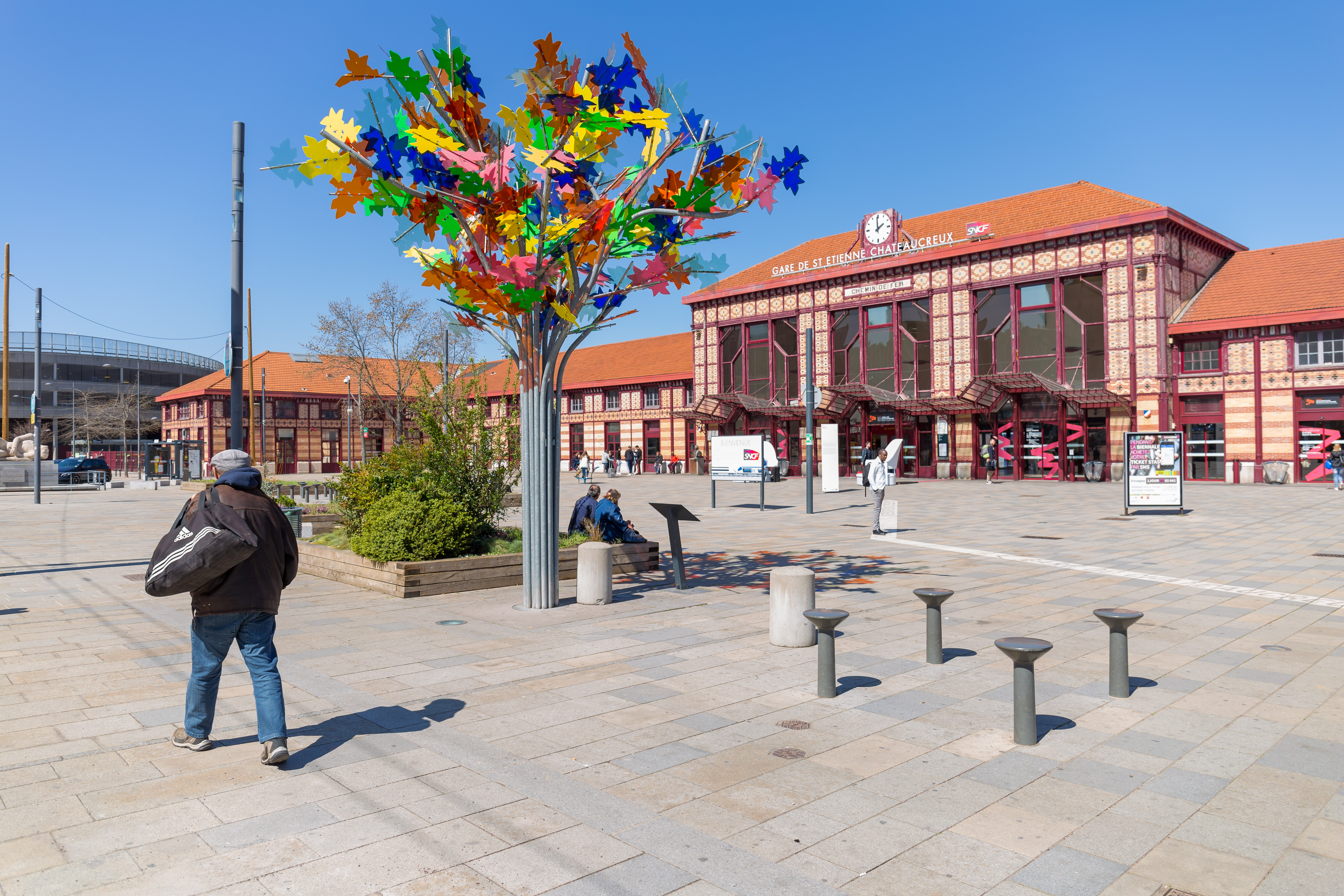
Building of Saint-Étienne-Châteaucreux

- Saarbrücken Hauptbahnhof (Germany)
- Sablé-sur-Sarthe
- Les Sables-d'Olonne
- Saint-Avre-La Chambre
- Saint-Brieuc
- Saint-Dié-des-Vosges
- Saint-Étienne-Châteaucreux
- Saint-Gervais-les-Bains-Le Fayet
- Saint-Jean-de-Luz
- Saint-Jean-de-Maurienne
- Saint-Maixent (Deux-Sèvres)
- Saint-Malo
- Saint-Michel-Valloire
- Saint-Nazaire
- Saint-Omer
- Saint-Pierre-des-Corps
- Saint-Raphaël-Valescure
- Sallanches
- Saumur
- Schiphol Airport (Netherlands)
- Sète
- Strasbourg-Ville
- Stuttgart Hauptbahnhof (Germany)
- Surgères

== T ==
- Tarbes
- La Teste
- Thionville
- Thonon-les-Bains
- Toulon
- Toulouse-Matabiau
- Tourcoing
- Tours
- Torino Porta Susa railway station (Italy)

== U ==
- Ulm Hauptbahnhof (Germany)

== V ==
- Valence TGV
- Valence-Ville
- Valenciennes
- Vallorbe railway station (Switzerland)
- Vannes
- Vendôme-Villiers-sur-Loir TGV
- Versailles-Chantiers
- Vitré

== Z ==
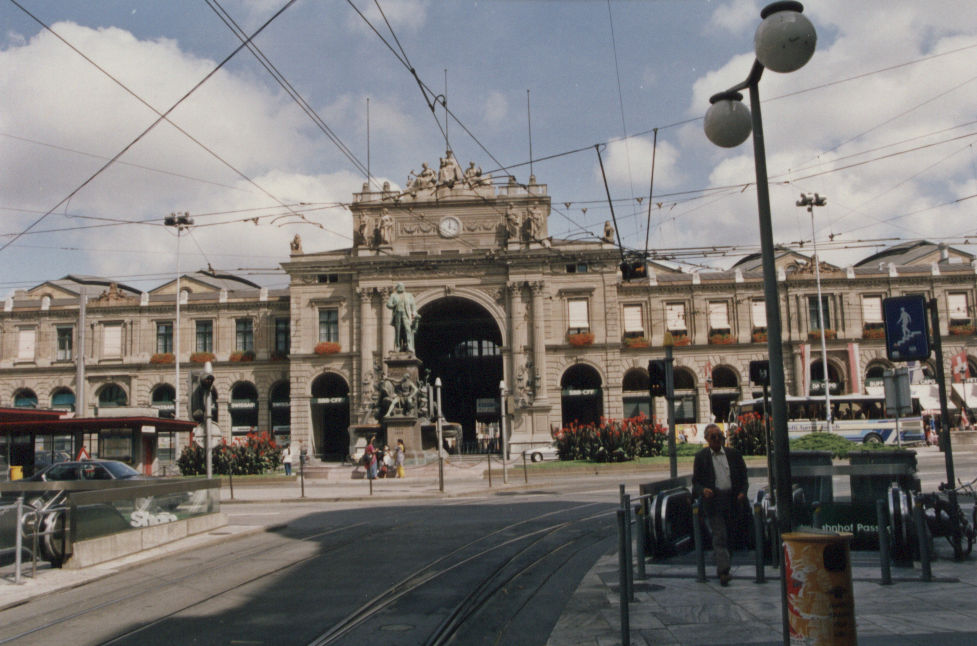
Zürich Hauptbahnhof entrance

- Zürich Hauptbahnhof (Switzerland)
