= Bannalec station =

Railway station in Bannalec, France

Bannalec Banaleg
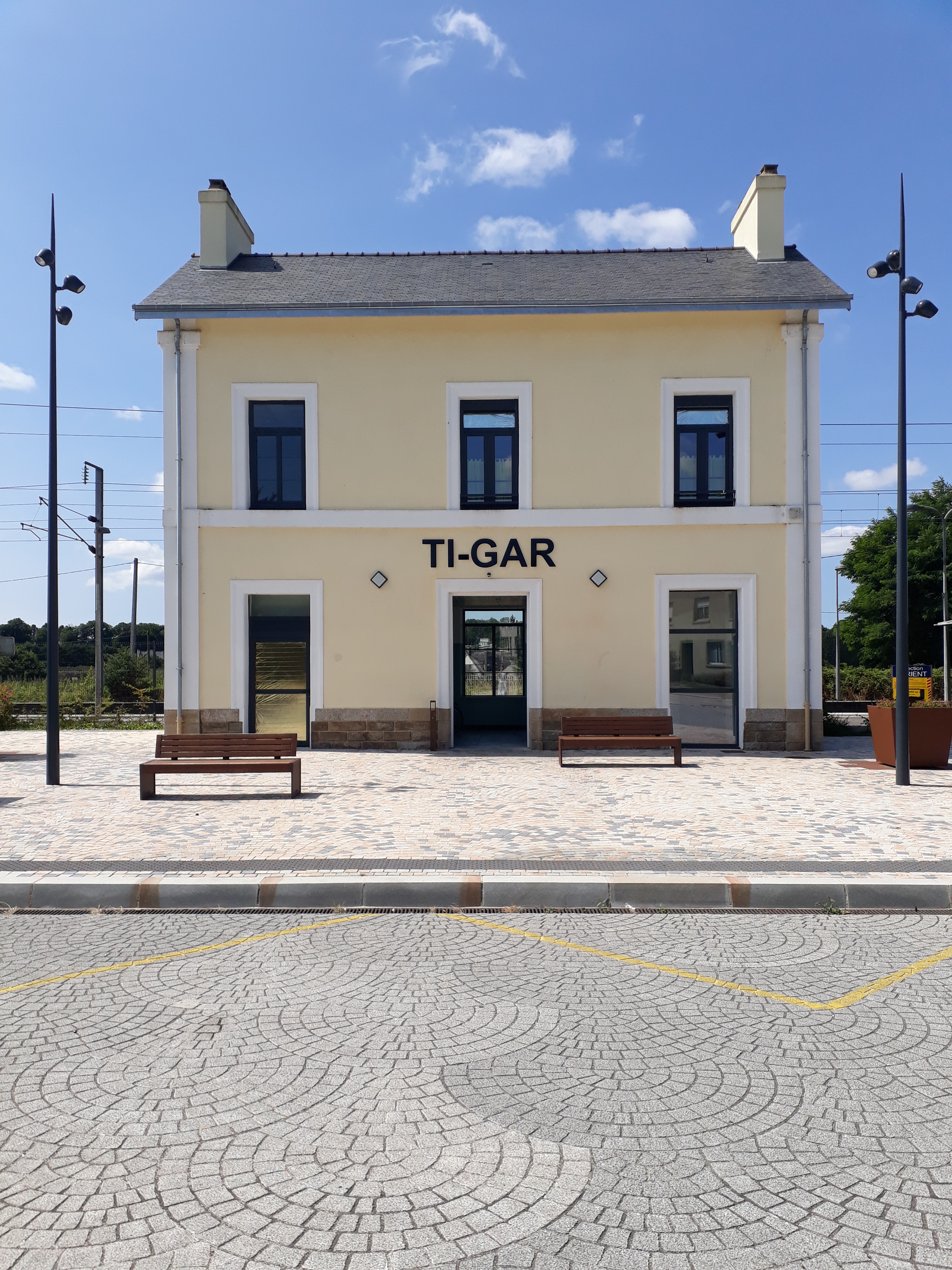
- Bannalec railway station

General information
- Location: Rue de la Gare; 29380 Bannalec; Finistère; France
- Coordinates: 47°55′36″N 3°42′21″W
- Elevation: 86 m (282 ft)
- Line: Savenay–Landerneau railway
- Distance: 653.987 km
- Platforms: 2
- Tracks: 2

Construction
- Architect: Phidias Vestier

Other information
- Station code: 87474189

History
- Opened: 8 September 1863

Passengers
- 2018: 22 562

Services
Preceding station	TER Bretagne	Following station
Rosporden towards Quimper	19	Quimperlé towards Vannes
Location

Bannalec station (French: Gare de Bannalec; Breton: Ti-gar Banaleg) is a railway station in Bannalec, Finistère, France. The station was opened on 8 September 1863, and is located at kilometric point (KP) 653.987 on the Savenay–Landerneau railway. Today, the station is served by TER Bretagne services operated by the SNCF.

== History ==
The construction of a railway station in Bannalec was realized by the Compagnie du chemin de fer de Paris à Orléans in the early 1860s. The station was inaugurated on 7 September 1863, alongside those from Lorient to Quimper. Normal train operations by the Compagnie du chemin de fer de Paris à Orléans commenced the next day.

The station consists of a passenger building constructed by the French architect Phidias Vestier.

In 2018, the SNCF recorded 22 562 passenger movements through the station.

== Train services ==
The following services currently call at Bannalec:

- local services (TER Bretagne) Quimper - Quimperlé - Lorient - Vannes

== Gallery ==
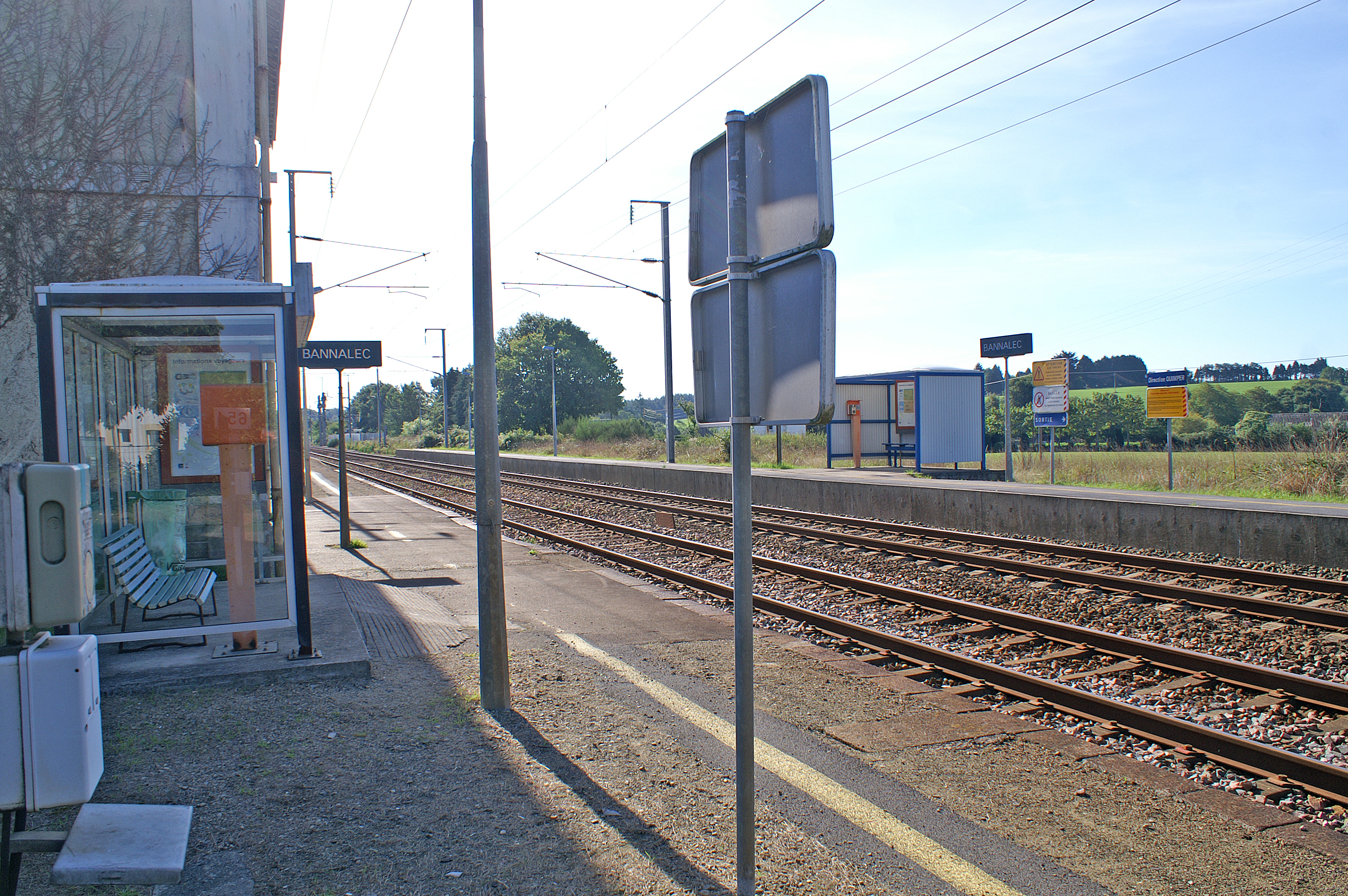
Station platforms and shelters in 2010.

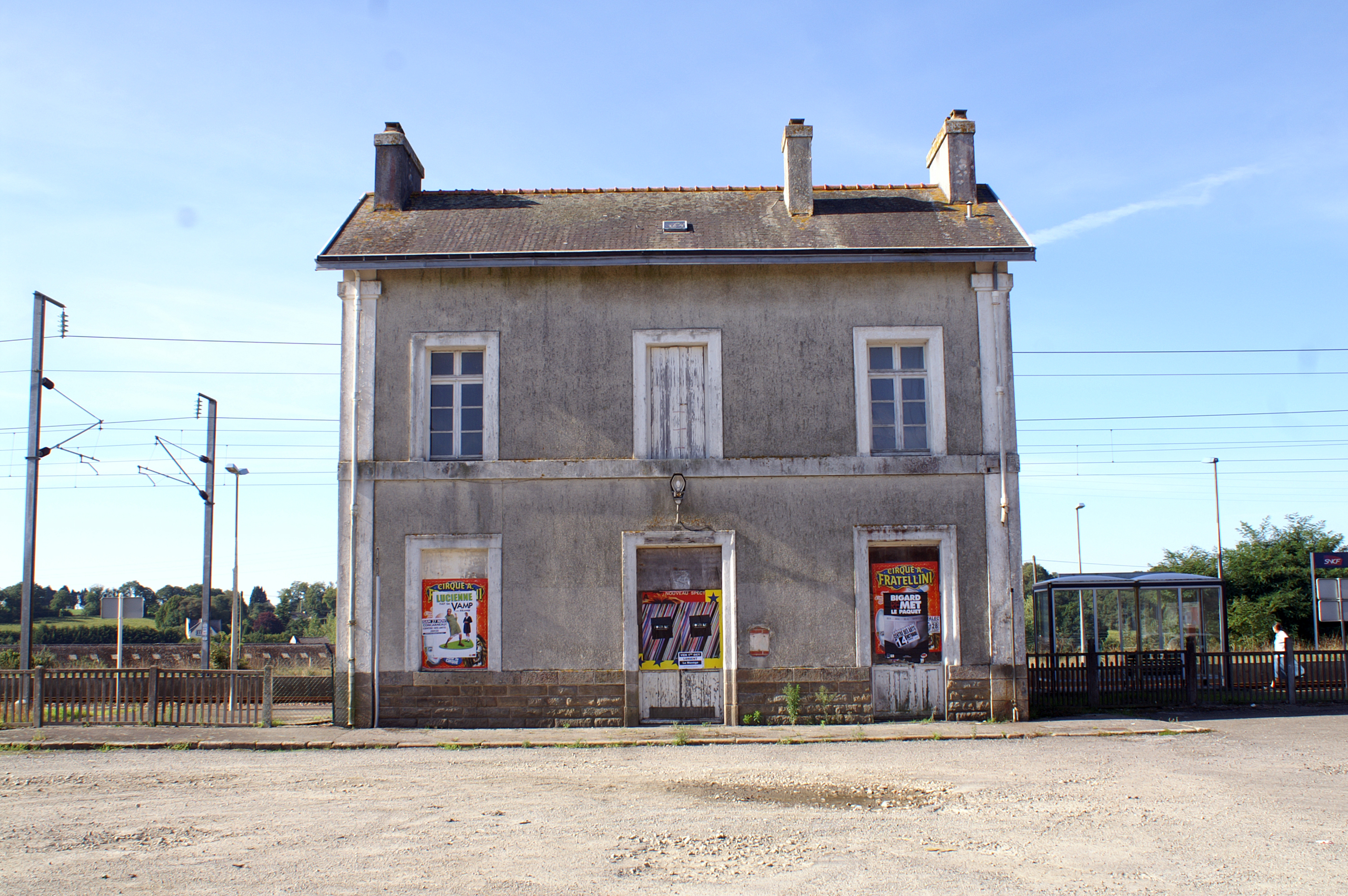
Passenger building prior to renovation.

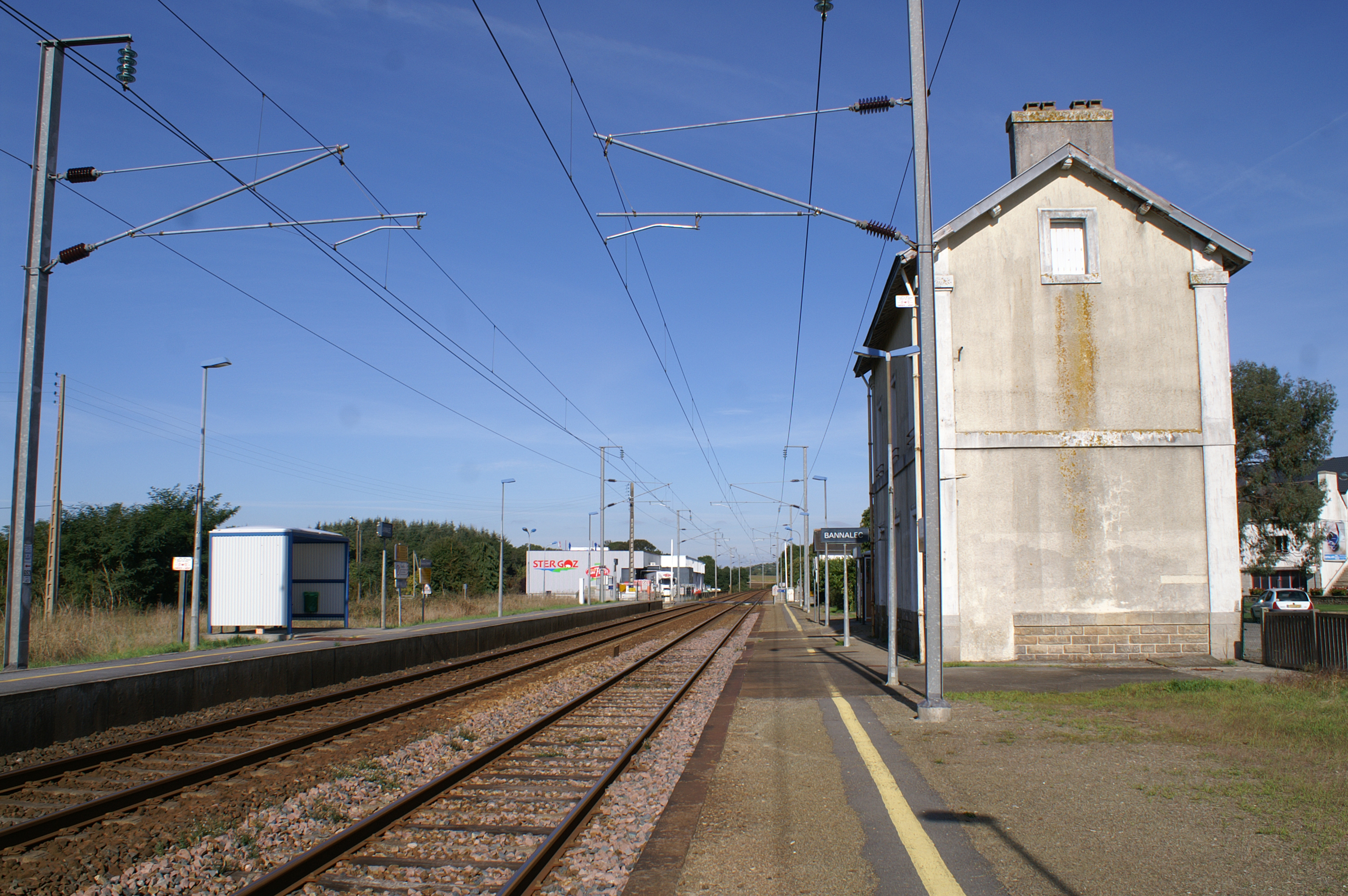
Station platforms and old passenger building.
