= Gestel station =

Railway station in Gestel, France

Gestel Yestael
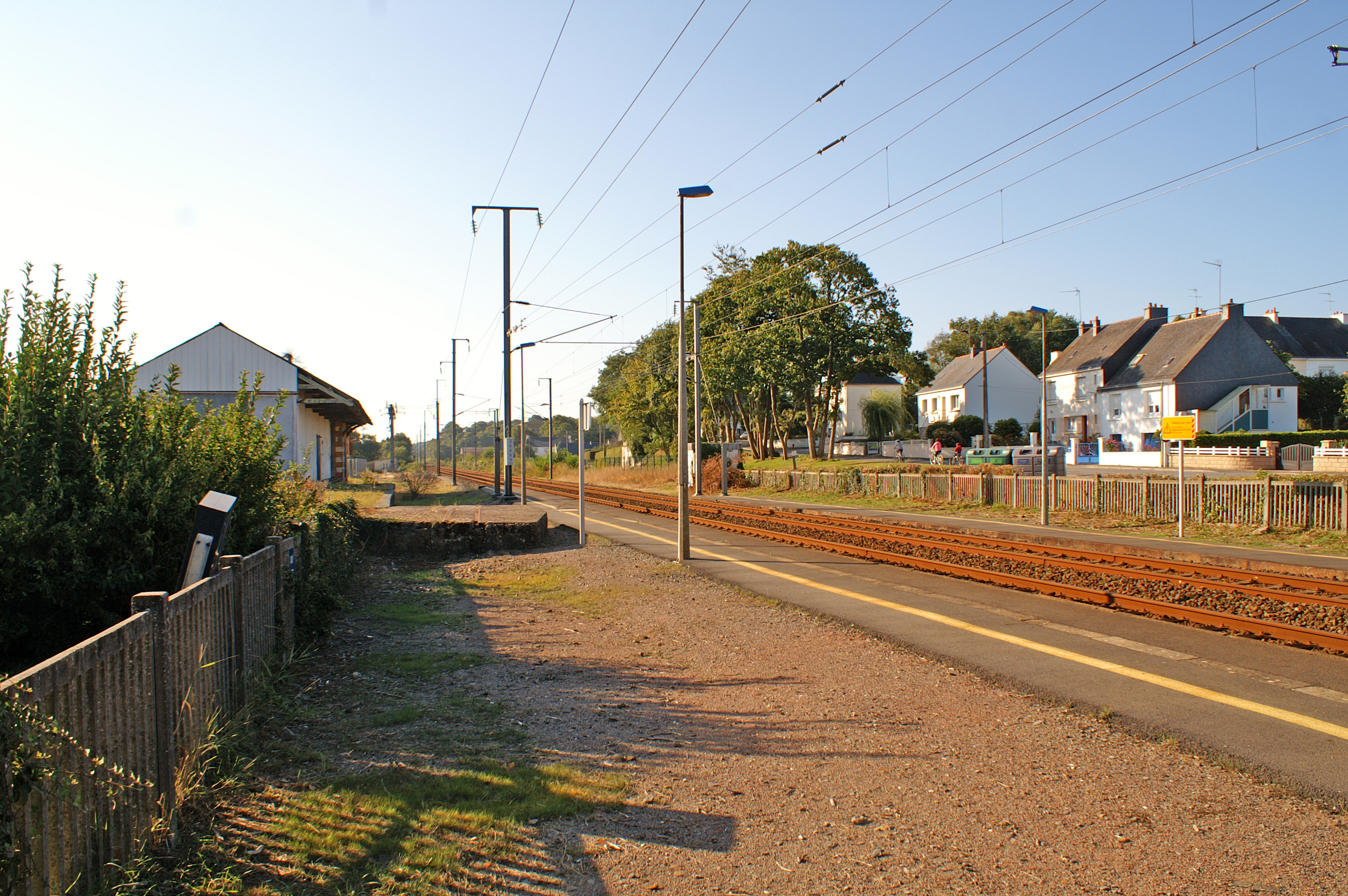
- Gestel railway station

General information
- Location: Gestel, Morbihan, Brittany, France
- Coordinates: 47°48′10″N 3°26′34″W
- Line: Savenay–Landerneau railway
- Platforms: 2
- Tracks: 2

Other information
- Station code: 87476309

History
- Opened: 8 September 1863
Location

Gestel station is a railway station in Gestel, Brittany, France. The station was opened on 8 September 1863, and is located on the Savenay–Landerneau railway. Today, the station is served by TER (local) services operated by the SNCF.

== Train services ==
The station is served by regional trains to Quimper, Lorient and Vannes.

Preceding station	TER Bretagne	Following station
Quimperlé towards Quimper	19	Lorient towards Vannes
