= Arthur Hervet =

French Roman Catholic priest (1938–2020)

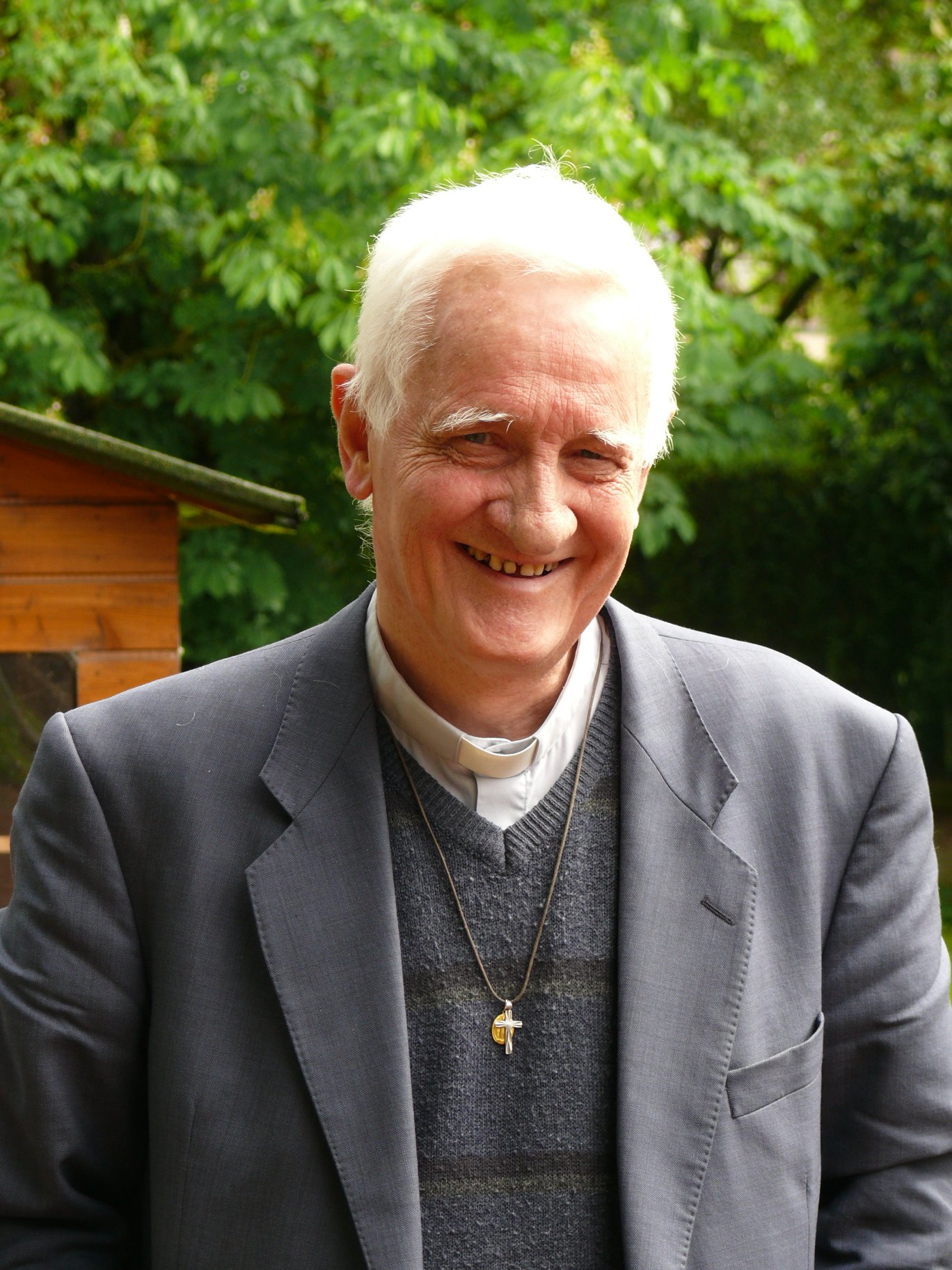
- Hervet in 2014
- Born: 11 November 1938; Bannalec, France
- Died: 23 November 2020 (aged 82); Lille, France
- Occupation: Catholic Priest

Arthur Hervet (11 November 1938 – 23 November 2020) was a French Roman Catholic priest who was a member of the Assumptionists. He was known for his fight for Romani people.

== Biography ==
Hervet grew up in poverty and his parents divorced. He was involved in an accident in which his leg was amputated. He was taken in by Catholic nuns before entering an Assumptionist seminary. He made his first vows at the age of 18 and earned a degree in physics before being ordained in 1968. He became a chaplain for secondary school students in Cachan and fought against incarceration and prostitution. Although he never met the man, he was influenced by Abbé Pierre.

In the mid-1980s, Hervet became chaplain of a Church boat moored in Conflans-Sainte-Honorine called the Je Sers. He founded the association La Pierre Blanche which aided the homeless and former prisoners. Appointed to serve in the Archdiocese of Lille, he began helping the Romani community there in 2006.

Father Arthur Hervet died in Lille on 23 November 2020 at the age of 82.

== Publications ==
- La Péniche du Bon Dieu (2007)
- Ma Vérité sur l'exclusion (2011)
