= Rosporden station =

Railway station in Rosporden, France

Rosporden
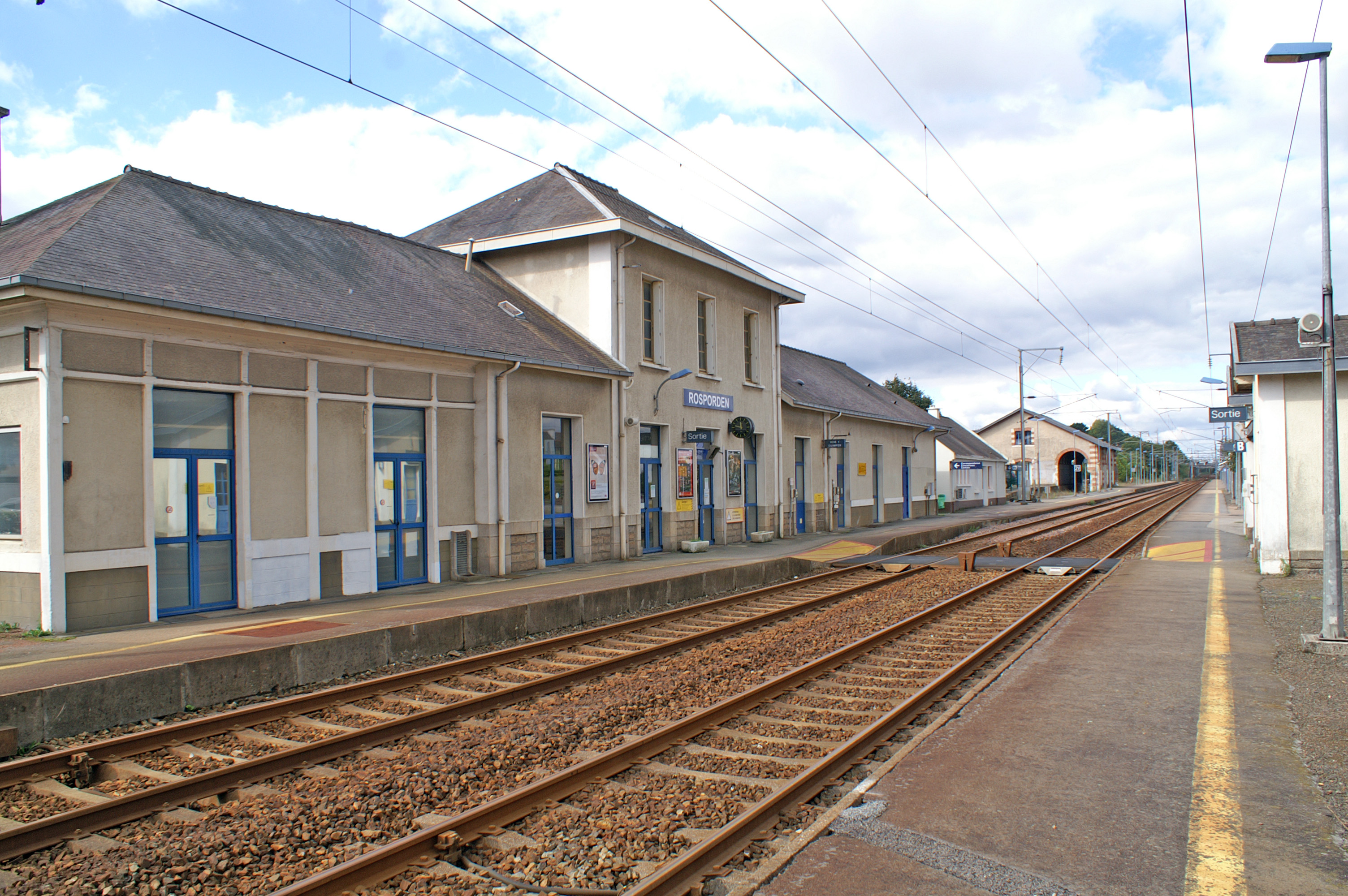
- Rosporden railway station

General information
- Location: Rosporden, Finistère, Brittany, France
- Coordinates: 47°57′38″N 3°50′03″W
- Line: Savenay–Landerneau railway

Other information
- Station code: 87474155

History
- Opened: 7 September 1863
Location

Rosporden is a railway station in Rosporden, Brittany, France. The station was opened on 7 September 1863, and is located on the Savenay–Landerneau railway. Today, the station is served by TGV (high speed) and TER (local) services operated by the SNCF.

== Train services ==
The station is served by high speed trains to Quimper and Paris, and regional trains to Quimper, Lorient, Nantes and Rennes.

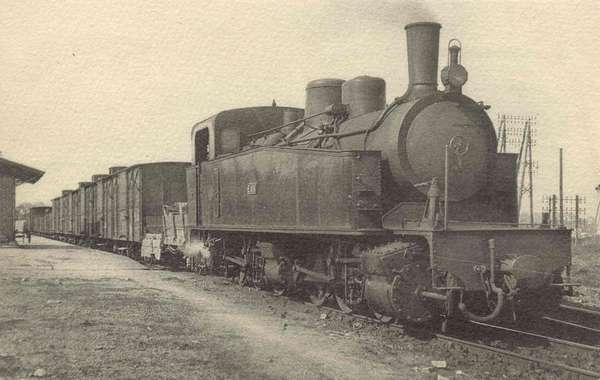
A steam train in the station around 1920

Preceding station	SNCF	Following station
Quimper Terminus	TGV	Quimperlé towards Montparnasse
Preceding station	TER Bretagne	Following station
Quimper Terminus	2	Quimperlé towards Rennes
Quimper Terminus	3	Quimperlé towards Nantes
Quimper Terminus	19	Bannalec towards Vannes
