= List of SNCF stations =

== SNCF stations by region ==
The following link to SNCF stations, grouped by region (SNCF managed RER stations with no other SNCF service are not included on the Île-de-France page – see List of stations of the Paris RER for a full listing of RER stations):

- List of SNCF stations in Auvergne-Rhône-Alpes
- List of SNCF stations in Bourgogne-Franche-Comté
- List of SNCF stations in Brittany
- List of SNCF stations in Centre-Val de Loire
- List of SNCF stations in Grand Est
- List of SNCF stations in Hauts-de-France
- List of SNCF stations in Île-de-France
- List of SNCF stations in Normandy
- List of SNCF stations in Nouvelle-Aquitaine
- List of SNCF stations in Occitanie
- List of SNCF stations in Pays de la Loire
- List of SNCF stations in Provence-Alpes-Côte d'Azur

== Former SNCF stations ==
The following link to articles on SNCF stations no longer in service

- Bordeaux État
- Rouen Rive-Gauche
- Rouen Nord
- Rouen Orléans
- Honfleur
- Paris Orsay (now the Musée d'Orsay)

== See also ==
- List of TGV stations
