= Quimperlé station =

Railway station in Quimperlé, France

Quimperlé Kemperle
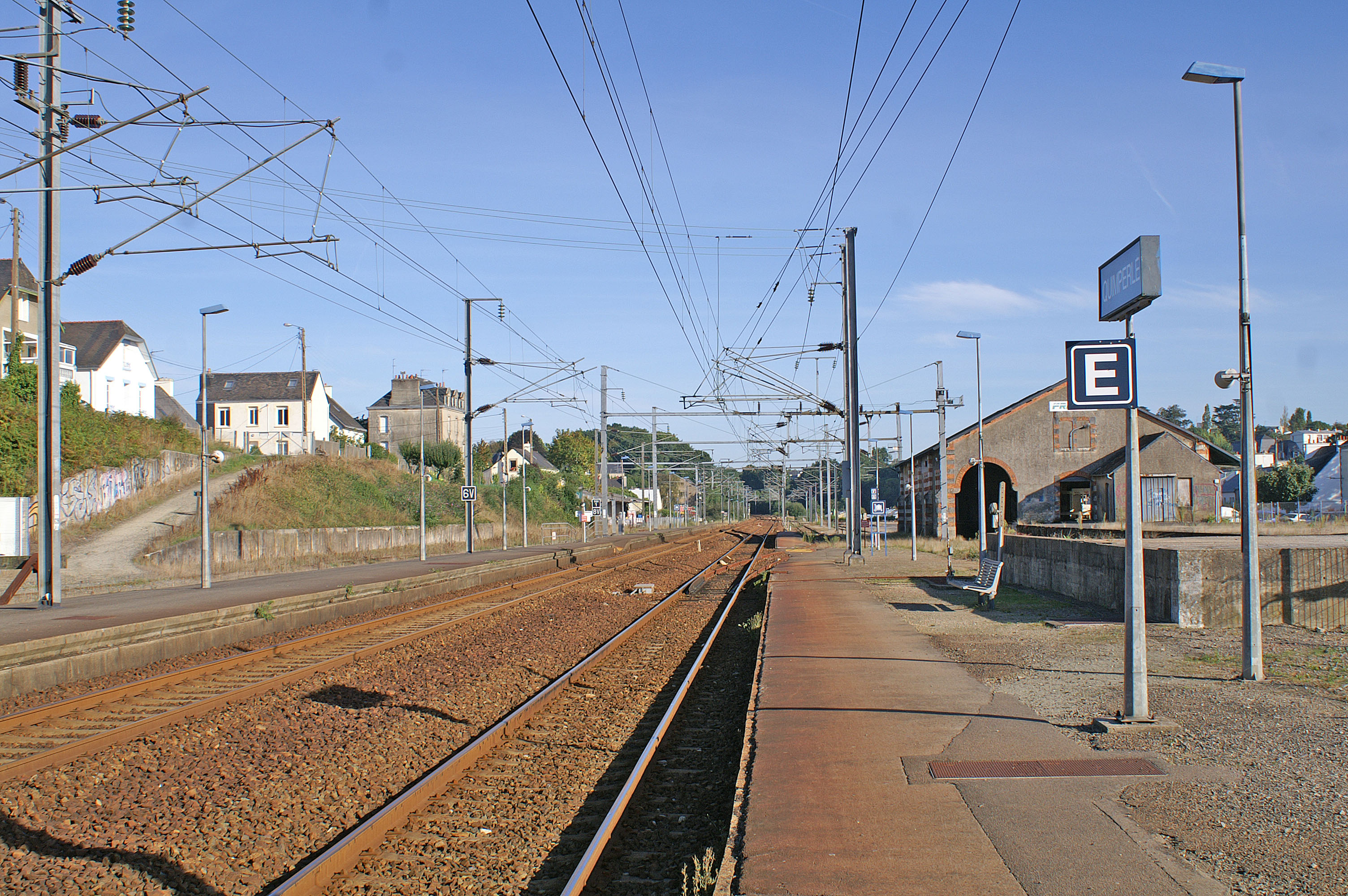
- Quimperlé railway station

General information
- Location: Boulevard de la Gare; 29300 Quimperlé; Finistère; France
- Coordinates: 47°52′10″N 3°33′11″W
- Line: Savenay–Landerneau railway
- Platforms: 2
- Tracks: 2

Other information
- Station code: 87476317

History
- Opened: 7 September 1863
Location

Quimperlé is a railway station in Quimperlé, Brittany, France. The station was opened on 7 September 1863, and is located on the Savenay–Landerneau railway. Today, the station is served by TGV (high speed), Intercités (long distance) and TER Bretagne services operated by the SNCF.

== Train services ==
The station is served by high speed trains to Quimper and Paris, and regional trains to Quimper, Lorient, Nantes and Rennes.

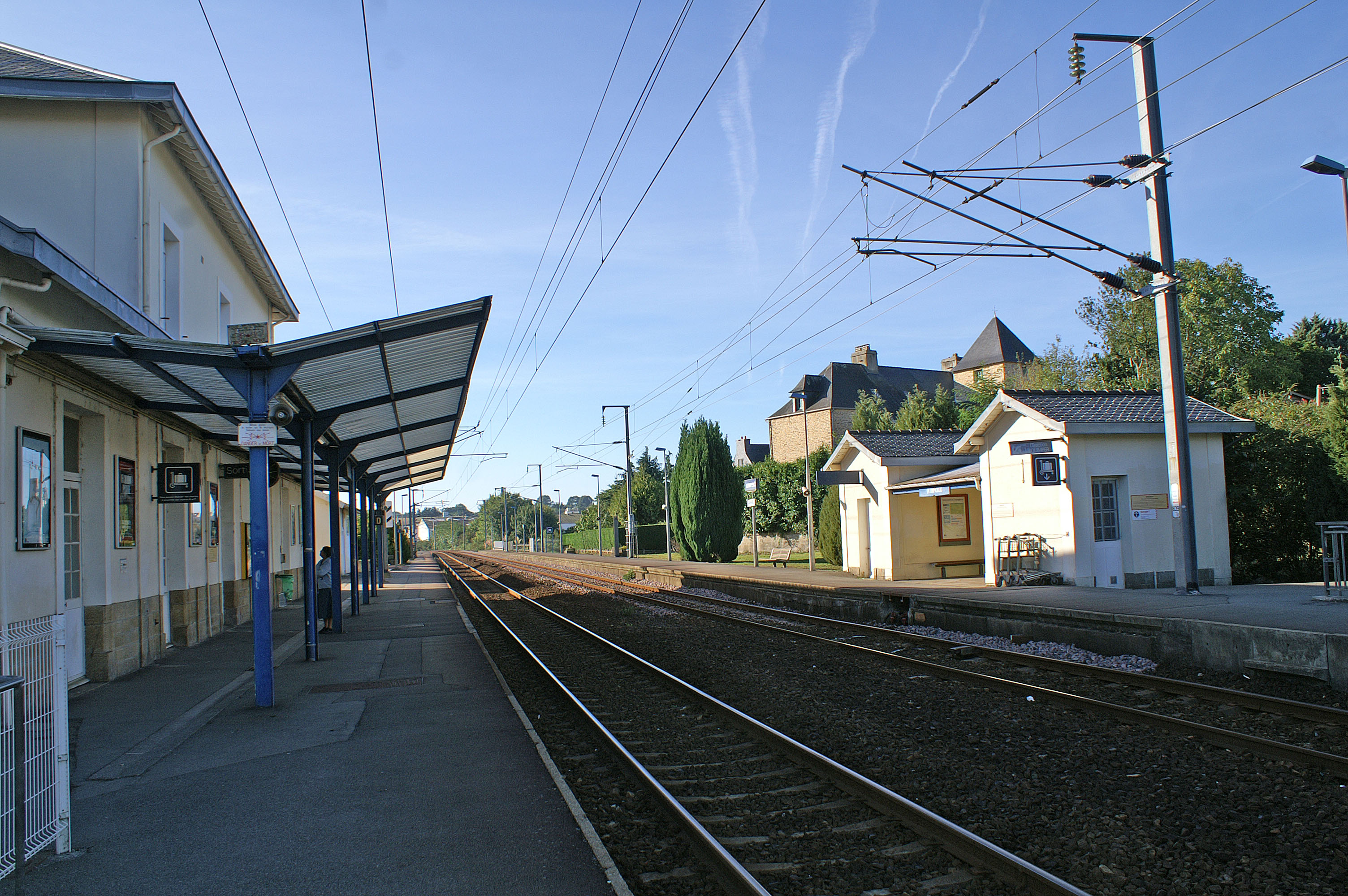
Quimperlé station

Preceding station	SNCF	Following station
Rosporden towards Quimper	TGV inOui	Lorient towards Montparnasse
Rosporden towards Quimper	TGV inOui Seasonal service	Lorient towards Lille-Flandres or Lille-Europe
Preceding station	TER Bretagne	Following station
Rosporden towards Quimper	2	Lorient towards Rennes
Rosporden towards Quimper	3	Lorient towards Nantes
Bannalec towards Quimper	19	Gestel towards Vannes
