= Bannalec =

Bannalec Banaleg
- Commune
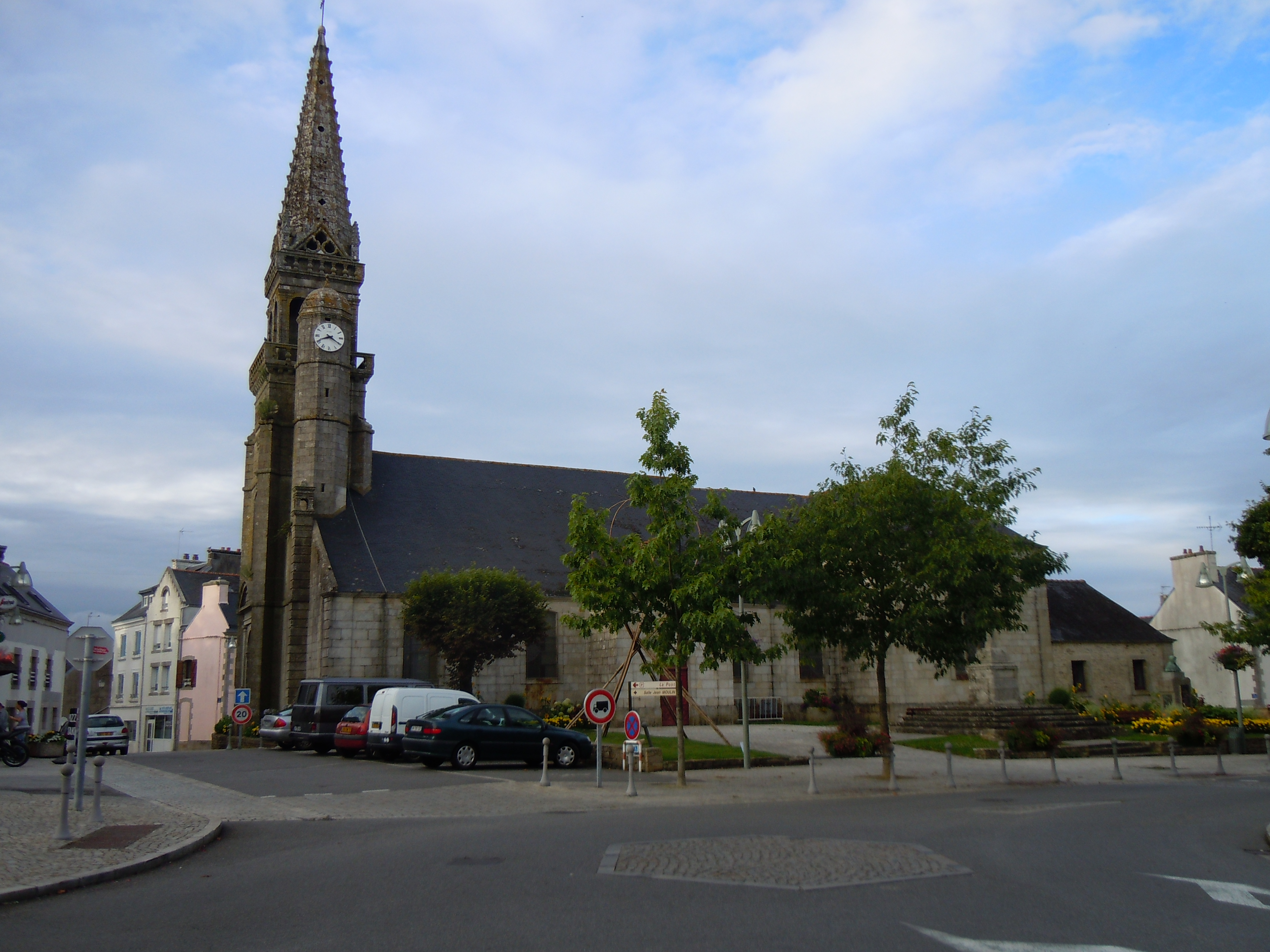
- The parish church of Our Lady of Folgoët, in Bannalec

- Coat of arms
- Location of Bannalec
- Location within France Location within Brittany
- Coordinates: 47°56′00″N 3°41′45″W
- Country: France
- Region: Brittany
- Department: Finistère
- Arrondissement: Quimper
- Canton: Moëlan-sur-Mer
- Intercommunality: CA Quimperlé Communauté

Government
  - Mayor (2020–2026): Christophe Le Roux
- Area^{1}: 77.51 km^{2} (29.93 sq mi)
- Highest elevation: 172 m (564 ft)
- Lowest elevation: 22 m (72 ft)
- Population (2023): 5,725
  - Density: 73.86/km^{2} (191.3/sq mi)
- Time zone: UTC+01:00 (CET)
  - Summer (DST): UTC+02:00 (CEST)
- INSEE/Postal code: 29004 /29380
- Website: Official website
- ^{1} French Land Register data, which excludes lakes, ponds, glaciers > 1 km^{2} (0.386 sq mi or 247 acres) and river estuaries.

Bannalec (French pronunciation: [banalɛk]; Breton: Banaleg) is a commune in the Finistère department in the Brittany region in northwestern France. Bannalec station has rail connections to Quimper, Lorient and Vannes. Bannalec is twinned with the Irish town of Castleisland.

== Geography ==
=== Climate ===
Bannalec has an oceanic climate (Köppen climate classification Cfb). The average annual temperature in Bannalec is 12.0 °C (53.6 °F). The average annual rainfall is 1,221.0 mm (48.07 in) with January as the wettest month. The temperatures are highest on average in August, at around 18.1 °C (64.6 °F), and lowest in January, at around 6.3 °C (43.3 °F). The highest temperature ever recorded in Bannalec was 38.0 °C (100.4 °F) on 9 August 2003; the coldest temperature ever recorded was −10.9 °C (12.4 °F) on 2 January 1997.

Climate data for Bannalec (1981–2010 averages, extremes 1984−2015)
Month	Jan	Feb	Mar	Apr	May	Jun	Jul	Aug	Sep	Oct	Nov	Dec	Year
Record high °C (°F)	15.6 (60.1)	18.8 (65.8)	23.9 (75.0)	27.7 (81.9)	31.4 (88.5)	34.2 (93.6)	36.2 (97.2)	38.0 (100.4)	31.8 (89.2)	28.9 (84.0)	20.8 (69.4)	16.7 (62.1)	38.0 (100.4)
Mean daily maximum °C (°F)	9.0 (48.2)	9.9 (49.8)	12.5 (54.5)	14.8 (58.6)	18.5 (65.3)	21.3 (70.3)	23.0 (73.4)	23.1 (73.6)	20.6 (69.1)	16.4 (61.5)	12.2 (54.0)	9.6 (49.3)	15.9 (60.6)
Daily mean °C (°F)	6.3 (43.3)	6.7 (44.1)	8.6 (47.5)	10.3 (50.5)	13.8 (56.8)	16.4 (61.5)	18.1 (64.6)	18.1 (64.6)	16.0 (60.8)	12.9 (55.2)	9.1 (48.4)	6.9 (44.4)	12.0 (53.6)
Mean daily minimum °C (°F)	3.6 (38.5)	3.5 (38.3)	4.7 (40.5)	5.9 (42.6)	9.1 (48.4)	11.4 (52.5)	13.2 (55.8)	13.1 (55.6)	11.3 (52.3)	9.3 (48.7)	6.0 (42.8)	4.1 (39.4)	8.0 (46.4)
Record low °C (°F)	−10.9 (12.4)	−8.5 (16.7)	−7.1 (19.2)	−3.5 (25.7)	0.0 (32.0)	3.0 (37.4)	5.0 (41.0)	3.5 (38.3)	3.0 (37.4)	−1.5 (29.3)	−4.5 (23.9)	−7.2 (19.0)	−10.9 (12.4)
Average precipitation mm (inches)	151.2 (5.95)	116.5 (4.59)	94.8 (3.73)	89.7 (3.53)	83.6 (3.29)	59.2 (2.33)	64.4 (2.54)	65.6 (2.58)	83.3 (3.28)	126.0 (4.96)	139.5 (5.49)	147.2 (5.80)	1,221 (48.07)
Average precipitation days (≥ 1.0 mm)	16.3	13.0	13.2	13.0	10.7	8.5	9.7	8.7	9.4	14.2	15.4	15.1	147.1
Source: Meteociel

== Population ==
Inhabitants of Bannalec are called Bannalécois.

Historical population

Year	Pop.	±% p.a.
1793	4,800	—
1800	4,396	−1.25%
1806	3,165	−5.33%
1821	4,363	+2.16%
1831	4,183	−0.42%
1836	4,377	+0.91%
1841	4,264	−0.52%
1846	4,372	+0.50%
1851	4,174	−0.92%
1856	4,425	+1.17%
1861	4,313	−0.51%
1866	4,611	+1.35%
1872	4,390	−0.82%
1876	4,787	+2.19%
1881	5,042	+1.04%
1886	5,259	+0.85%
1891	5,890	+2.29%
1896	5,910	+0.07%
1901	6,040	+0.44%

Year	Pop.	±% p.a.
1906	6,141	+0.33%
1911	6,138	−0.01%
1921	6,170	+0.05%
1926	6,323	+0.49%
1931	6,159	−0.52%
1936	6,067	−0.30%
1946	6,098	+0.05%
1954	5,511	−1.26%
1962	5,369	−0.33%
1968	5,235	−0.42%
1975	5,023	−0.59%
1982	4,975	−0.14%
1990	4,840	−0.34%
1999	4,785	−0.13%
2007	5,144	+0.91%
2012	5,552	+1.54%
2017	5,659	+0.38%
2023	5,725	+0.19%

Source: EHESS and INSEE (1968-2023)

== Breton language ==
In 2008, 7.91% of primary-school children attended bilingual schools, where Breton language is taught alongside French.

== See also ==
- Communes of the Finistère department
- François Bazin (sculptor) Sculptor monument to aviator
