= Je Sers =

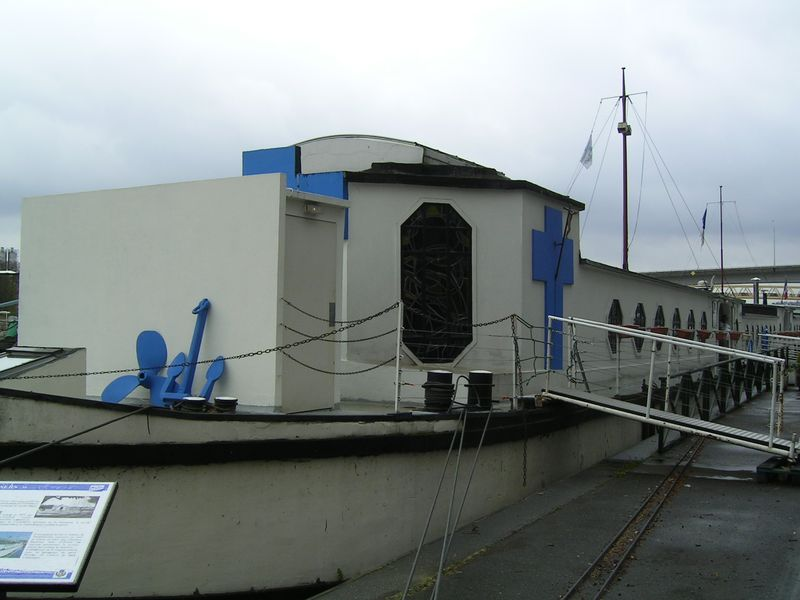
Je Sers

The Je Sers, is a chapel-boat for boatmen, dedicated to Saint-Nicholas. It is moored at The Quai de la Republique of Conflans-Sainte-Honorine (France) and registered at the Inventaire général du patrimoine culturel.

== History ==
Built by the French state in 1919 in Amfreville in the Eure department, this barge was destined for the shipping of coal. It was first called the Langemark in tribute of the Belgian city located near Ypres, where mustard gas was released for the first time 22 April 1915.

In 1919, on June 2, the barge obtained its gauging certificate and on June 7 of the same year, its first matriculation (n°4195 for the French State). On June 24, 1924, it obtained its new matriculation in Paris (N°9401). On April 8, 1936, the barge was purchased by the Entraide Sociale Batelière Entraide Sociale Batelière by cession (n°693) of the Ministry of public works. It was renamed "Je Sers" ["I serve the people"] by the founding abbot Joseph Bellanger and inaugurated on November 11, 1936, and blessed by the Bishop of Versailles Benjamin-Octave Roland- Gosselin.

Today, the chapel is still a parish for the bargemen, but it is also a place for help by services intended for freshwater marines but for people on land, as well.

Since 2014, Tibetan refugees have been taken in and looked after in the chapel.

== Technical features ==
- Maximum length: 70.26 m/ = 230.51 ft
- Maximum width: 8.10 m/ 26.57 ft Height under gunwale: 3.02 m/ 9.9 ft
- Maximum depth: 3.00 m/ 9.84 ft Real unloaded depth: 1.20 m/ 3.94 ft
- Weight unloaded with superstructure: 300t

== Layout ==
The chapel boat houses:

- at the back: a meeting room, a locker room, and a food bank
- in the centre: a reception room, an exhibition of waterway transport items, informations boards, and an office covered by a canopy, where the chaplain's desk is open non-stop.
- at the front: a chapel under a dome-shaped light made with a glass block.
