= TER Bretagne =

Regional rail network

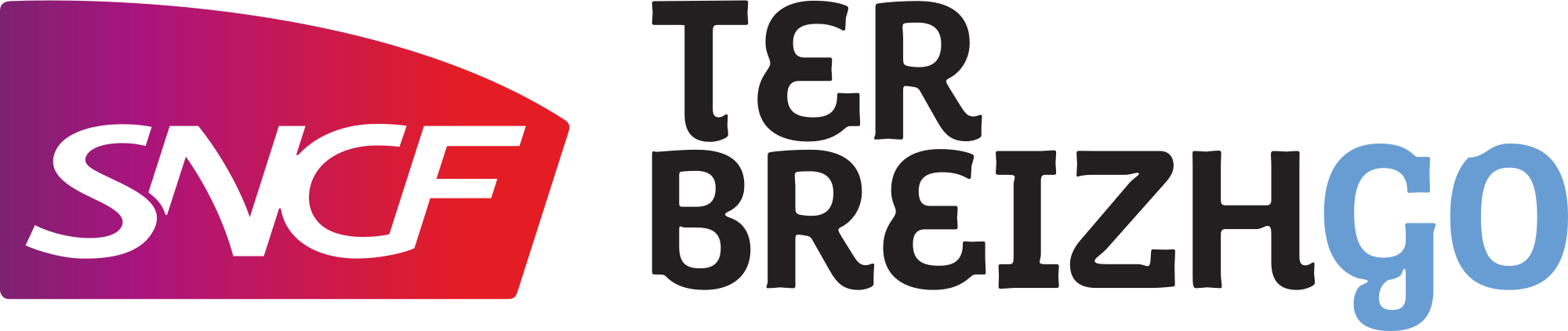

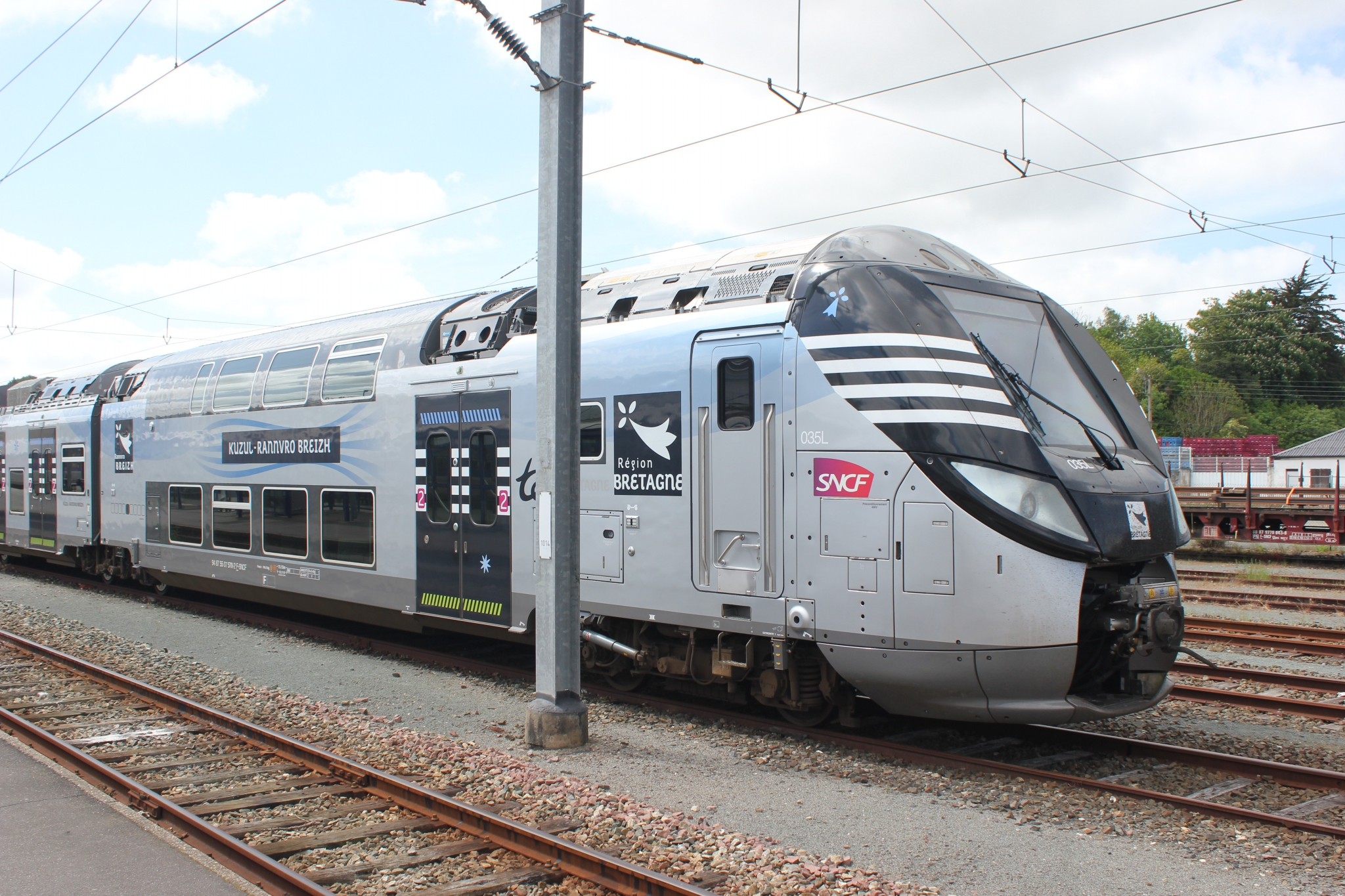
- TER train in the colours of the Regional Council of Brittany

Overview
- Owner: SNCF
- Area served: Brittany, France
- Number of lines: 17 (train) + 115 (bus)
- Number of stations: 124
- Daily ridership: 37,000
- Website: m.ter.sncf.com/bretagne

Operation
- Began operation: 1986
- Operator: SNCF
- Infrastructure manager: SNCF

Technical
- System length: 1381 km
- Track gauge: 1,435 mm (4 ft 8 1/2 in) standard gauge

TER Bretagne (stylized as TER BreizhGo since 2018) is the TER regional rail network serving the administrative region of Brittany, in north-west France.

== Network ==
Rail transport infrastructure map of Brittany, showing main stations, number of tracks, power source and maximum speed.

The rail and bus network as of April 2022:

=== Rail ===
Line	Route
1	Brest – Landerneau – Landivisiau – Morlaix – Plouaret-Trégor† – Guingamp – Saint-Brieuc – Lamballe – Rennes
2	Quimper – Rosporden – Quimperlé – Lorient – Hennebont† – Auray – Vannes – Questembert – Redon – Messac-Guipry† – Rennes
3	Quimper – Rosporden† – Quimperlé† – Lorient – Hennebont† – Auray – Vannes – Questembert† – Redon – Saint-Gildas-des-Bois† – Pontchâteau† – Savenay† – Nantes
4	Rennes ... Redon ... Nantes (see TER Pays de la Loire line 2 for details)
9	Rennes ... Janzé ... Châteaubriant
13	Saint-Malo ... Dol-de-Bretagne ... Montreuil-sur-Ille ... Rennes
14	Rennes ... Vitré ... Laval ... Le Mans (see TER Pays de la Loire line 27 for details)
15	Rennes ... Messac-Guipry ... Redon – Malansac – Questembert – Vannes
16	Saint-Brieuc ... Lamballe ... La Brohinière ... Rennes
19	Quimper – Rosporden – Bannalec – Quimperlé – Gestel – Lorient – Hennebont – Brandérion – Landévant – Landaul-Mendon – Auray – Sainte-Anne – Vannes
21	Lannion – Plouaret-Trégor ... Guingamp ... Saint-Brieuc branch line: Plouaret-Trégor – Plounérin – Plouigneau – Morlaix
22	Brest ... Landerneau ... Morlaix
24 (17)	Saint-Brieuc ... Lamballe ... Dinan ... Dol-de-Bretagne
25	Carhaix ... Guingamp
25b	Guingamp ... Paimpol
31	Brest – Landerneau – Dirinon – Pont-de-Buis – Châteaulin – Quimper
32	Auray – Belz-Ploemel – Plouharnel-Carnac – Les Sables-Blancs – Penthièvre – Isthme – Kerhostin – Saint-Pierre-Quiberon – Quiberon (summer only)
† Not all trains call at this station

=== Road ===
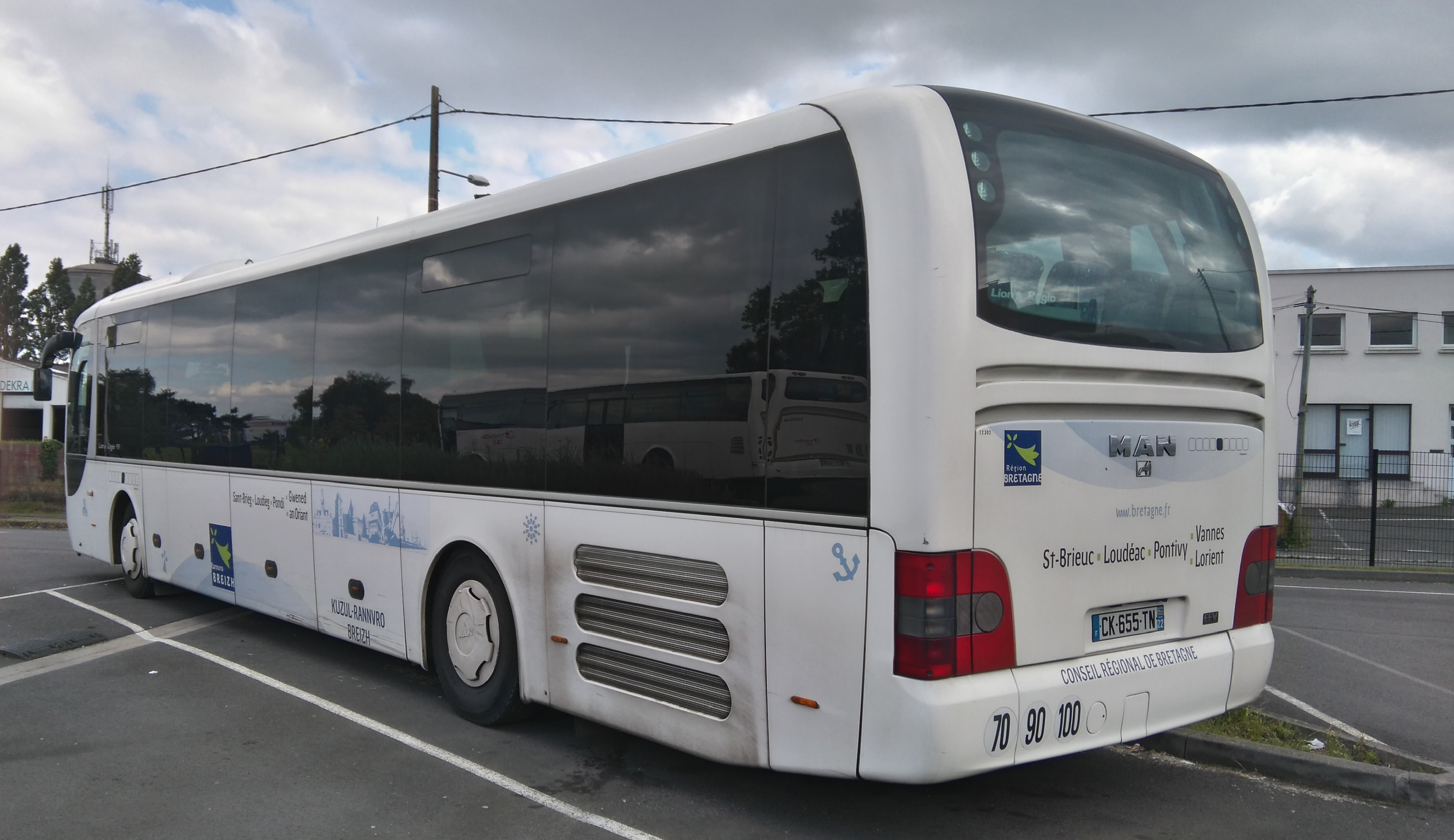
TER Bretagne bus.

The bus network BreizhGo consists of 115 routes as of 2022.

== Rolling stock ==
=== Multiple units ===
- 9 SNCF Class B 82500
- 5 SNCF Class Z 9600
- 19 SNCF Class Z 21500
- 14 SNCF Class Z 27500
- 19 SNCF Class X 2100
- 15 SNCF Class X 73500
- 8 SNCF Class Z 55500

=== Locomotives ===
- 9 SNCF Class BB 25500

=== Ordered ===
- 13 SNCF Class Z 55500
