= Landerneau station =

Railway station in France

Coordinates: 48°27′13″N 4°15′23″W

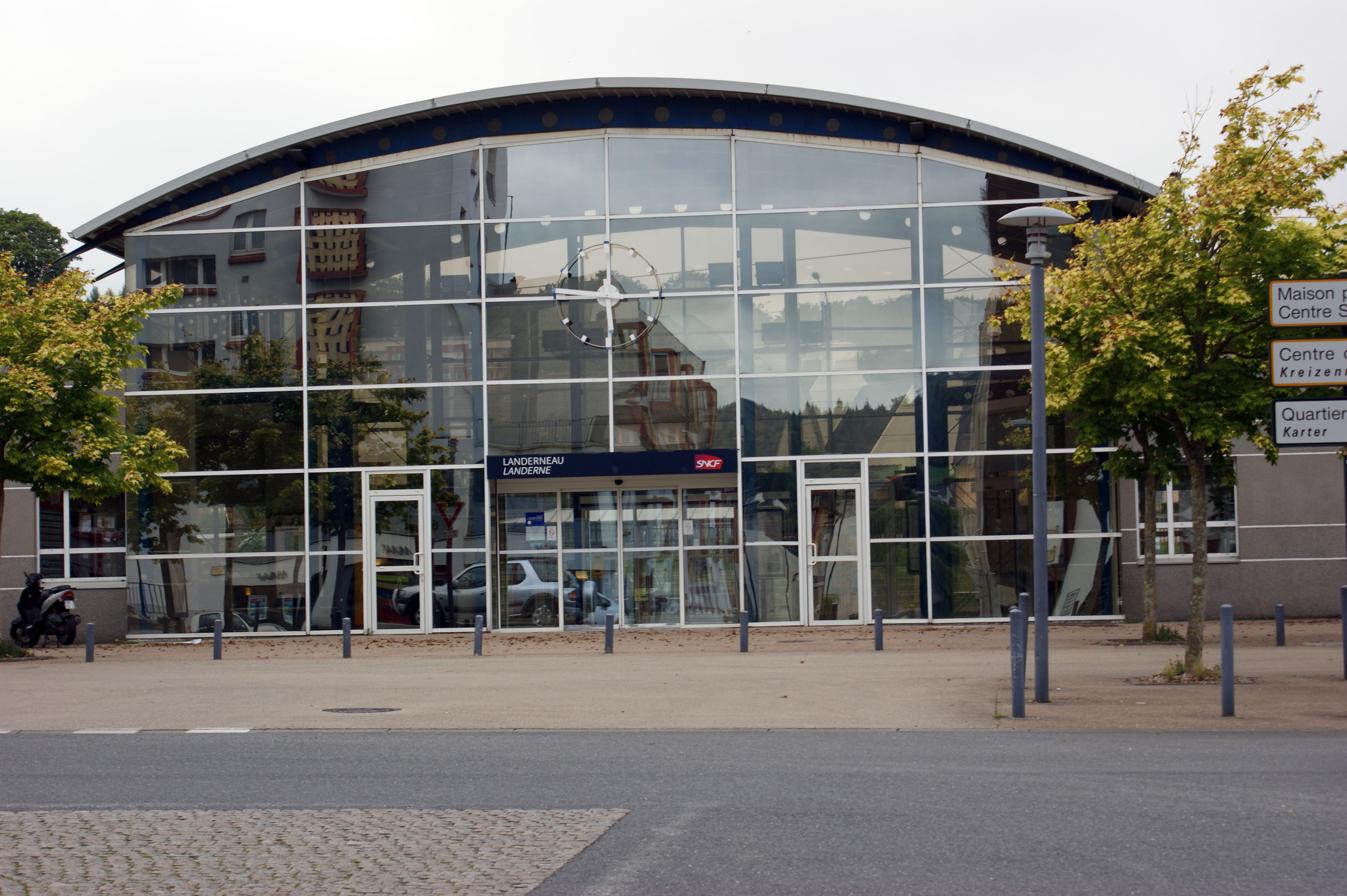
The station

Landerneau station (French: Gare de Landerneau; Breton: Ti-gar Landerne) is a French railway station serving the town Landerneau, Finistère department, in western France. It is situated on the Paris–Brest railway and the branch to Quimper.

== Services ==
The station is served by high speed trains to Brest, Rennes and Paris, and regional trains to Brest, Morlaix, Quimper and Rennes.

Preceding station	SNCF	Following station
Brest Terminus	TGV	Morlaix towards Montparnasse
Preceding station	TER Bretagne	Following station
Brest Terminus	1	Landivisiau towards Rennes
La Forest towards Brest	22	La Roche-Maurice towards Morlaix
Brest Terminus	31	Dirinon-Loperhet towards Quimper
