= Brest station =

Railway station in France

Brest
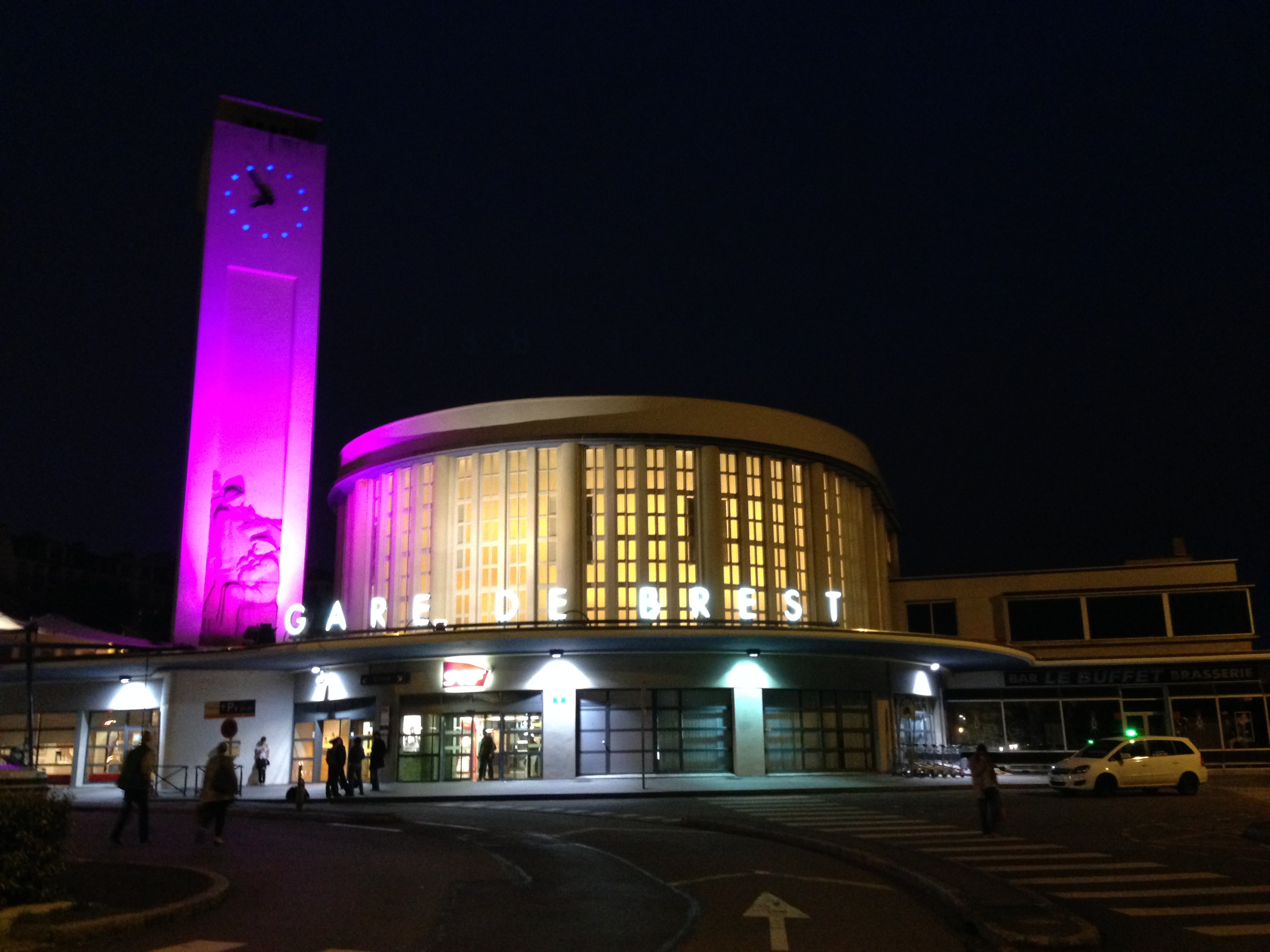
- Lit station façade and clock tower at night

General information
- Location: 8, place du 19^{e} RI; 29200 Brest; France
- Coordinates: 48.3878°N 4.4805°W
- Owner: RFF, SNCF
- Operator: SNCF
- Line: Paris–Brest railway
- Platforms: 6 (A–F; 3 island platforms)

Construction
- Structure type: At-grade

Other information
- Station code: 87474007

History
- Opened: 1865; 161 years ago

Passengers
- 2024: 2,777,923

Services
Preceding station	SNCF	Following station
Terminus	TGV	Landerneau towards Montparnasse
Preceding station	TER Bretagne	Following station
Terminus	1	Landerneau towards Rennes
Terminus	22	Kerhuon towards Morlaix
Terminus	31	Landerneau towards Quimper
Location

Brest station (French: Gare de Brest) is the railway station serving Brest, France. It is the western terminus of the Paris–Brest railway. The new station, built above the town's harbour in 1937 on the site of its 1865 predecessor, includes a tall clock tower and a semi circle passenger hall. The current building of 1932, by the CF de l'Etat, replaces the older building built in 1865 by the CF de l'Ouest.

The station saw the arrival of the TGV Atlantique in 1990 but saw little changes to its structure.

Brest is linked to Rennes and Paris as well as regional (TER) services to Brittany including Quimper, Landerneau, Morlaix and Lannion (via Plouaret-Trégor). TGV trains to Paris take approximately less than three and a half hours to reach the capital.
