= Savenay–Landerneau railway =

- Map of the line

Overview
- Status: Operational
- Owner: RFF
- Locale: France (Pays de la Loire, Brittany)
- Termini: Savenay station; Landerneau station

Service
- System: SNCF
- Operator(s): SNCF

History
- Opened: 1862–1867

Technical
- Line length: 245 km (152 mi)
- Number of tracks: Savenay-Quimper: Double track Quimper-Landerneau: Single track
- Track gauge: 1,435 mm (4 ft 8 1/2 in) standard gauge
- Electrification: Savenay–Quimper 25 kV 50 Hz
- Operating speed: 220 km/h (140 mph)

The railway from Savenay to Landerneau is an important French 245-kilometre long railway line. It is used for passenger (express, regional and suburban) and freight traffic. The railway was opened in several stages between 1862 and 1867.

== Traffic ==
- TGV
- TER Bretagne
- TER Pays de la Loire

=== Main stations ===
- Savenay station
- Redon station
- Vannes station
- Auray station
- Lorient station
- Quimper station
- Landerneau station

== Line history ==
The section between Savenay and Lorient was opened in 1862

- Lorient – Quimper: 1863
- Quimper – Châteaulin: 1864
- Châteaulin – Landerneau: 1867
