= Lorient station =

Railway station in Lorient, France

Lorient–Bretagne Sud An Oriant–Kreisteiz Breizh
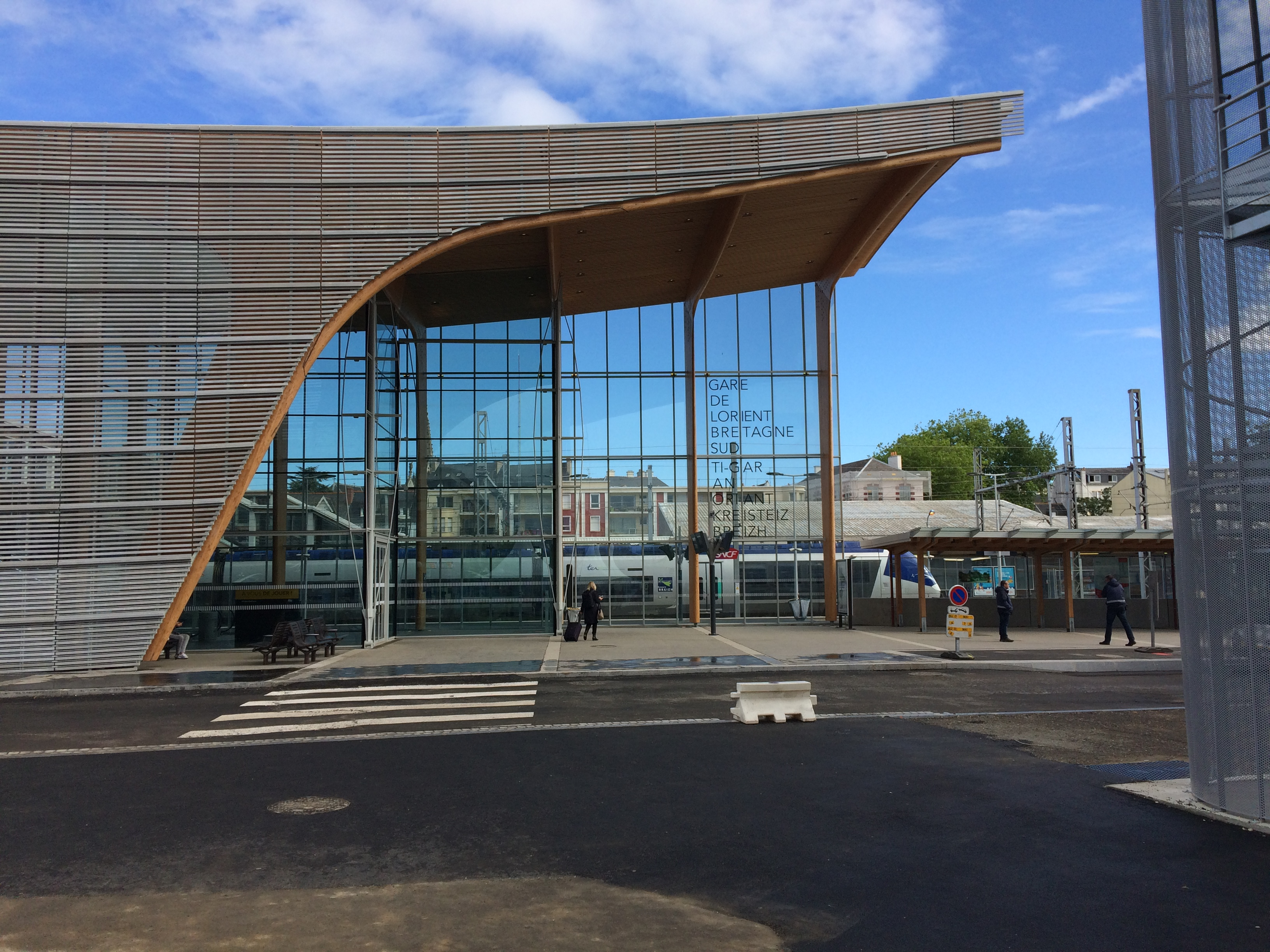
- Main entrance, with a TER visible in the platform area behind

General information
- Location: Lorient, Morbihan, Brittany, France
- Coordinates: 47°45′19″N 3°21′58″W
- Line: Savenay–Landerneau railway

Other information
- Station code: 87476002

History
- Opened: 26 September 1862

Passengers
- 2024: 2,066,021
Location

Lorient is a railway station in Lorient, Brittany, France. The station was opened on 26 September 1862 is located on the Savenay–Landerneau railway. Today, the station is served by TGV (high speed), Intercités (long distance) and TER (local) services operated by the SNCF.

== Train services ==
The station is served by high speed trains to Quimper and Paris, and regional trains to Quimper, Vannes, Nantes and Rennes.

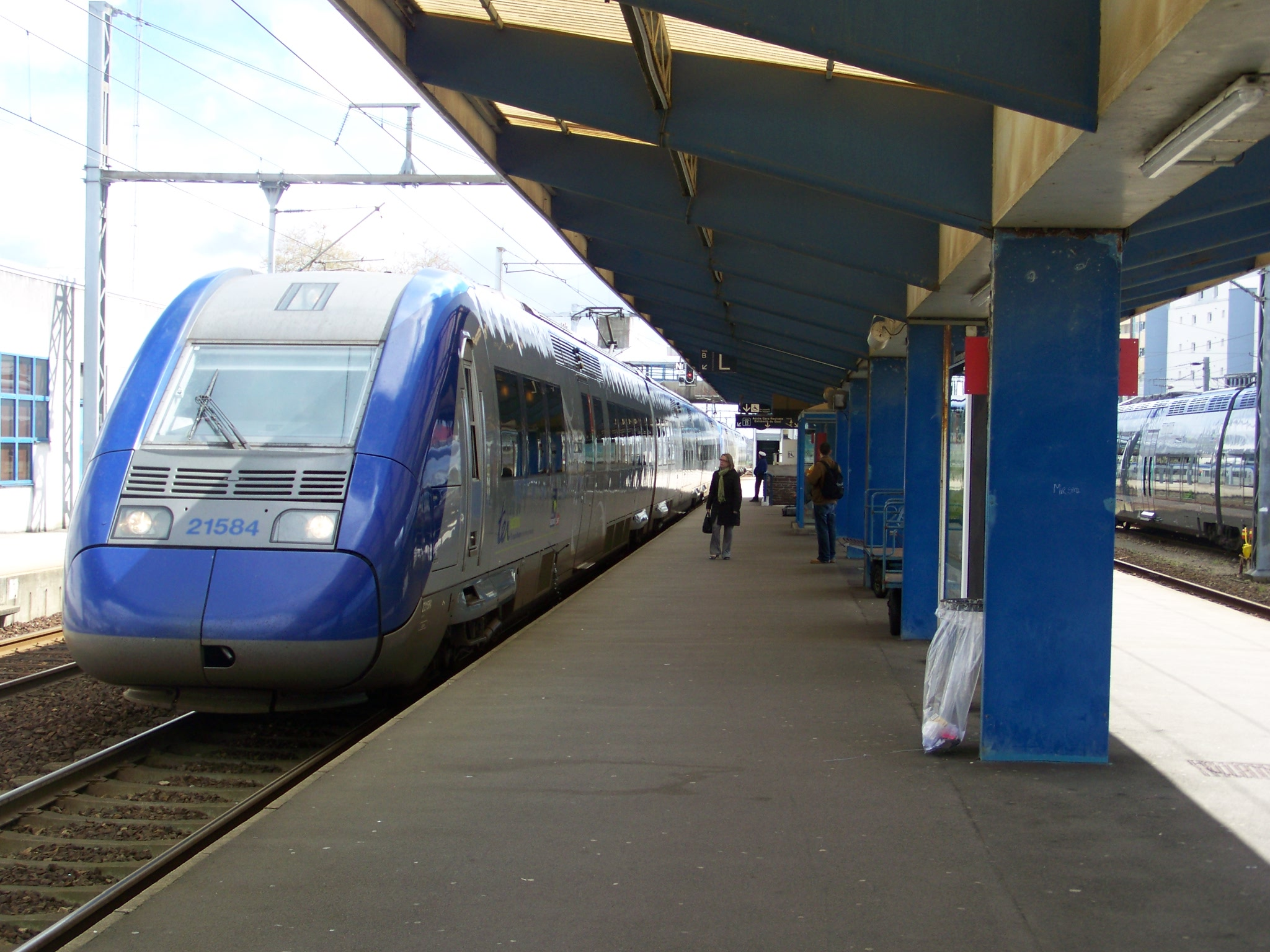
A TER at Lorient station in 2009

Preceding station	SNCF	Following station
Quimper Terminus	TGV inOui	Auray towards Montparnasse
Quimperlé towards Quimper	TGV inOui Seasonal service	Auray towards Lille-Flandres or Lille-Europe
Preceding station	TER Bretagne	Following station
Quimperlé towards Quimper	2	Hennebont towards Rennes
Quimperlé towards Quimper	3	Hennebont towards Nantes
Gestel towards Quimper	19	Hennebont towards Vannes
