= Vannes station =

Railway station in Vannes, France

Vannes Gwened
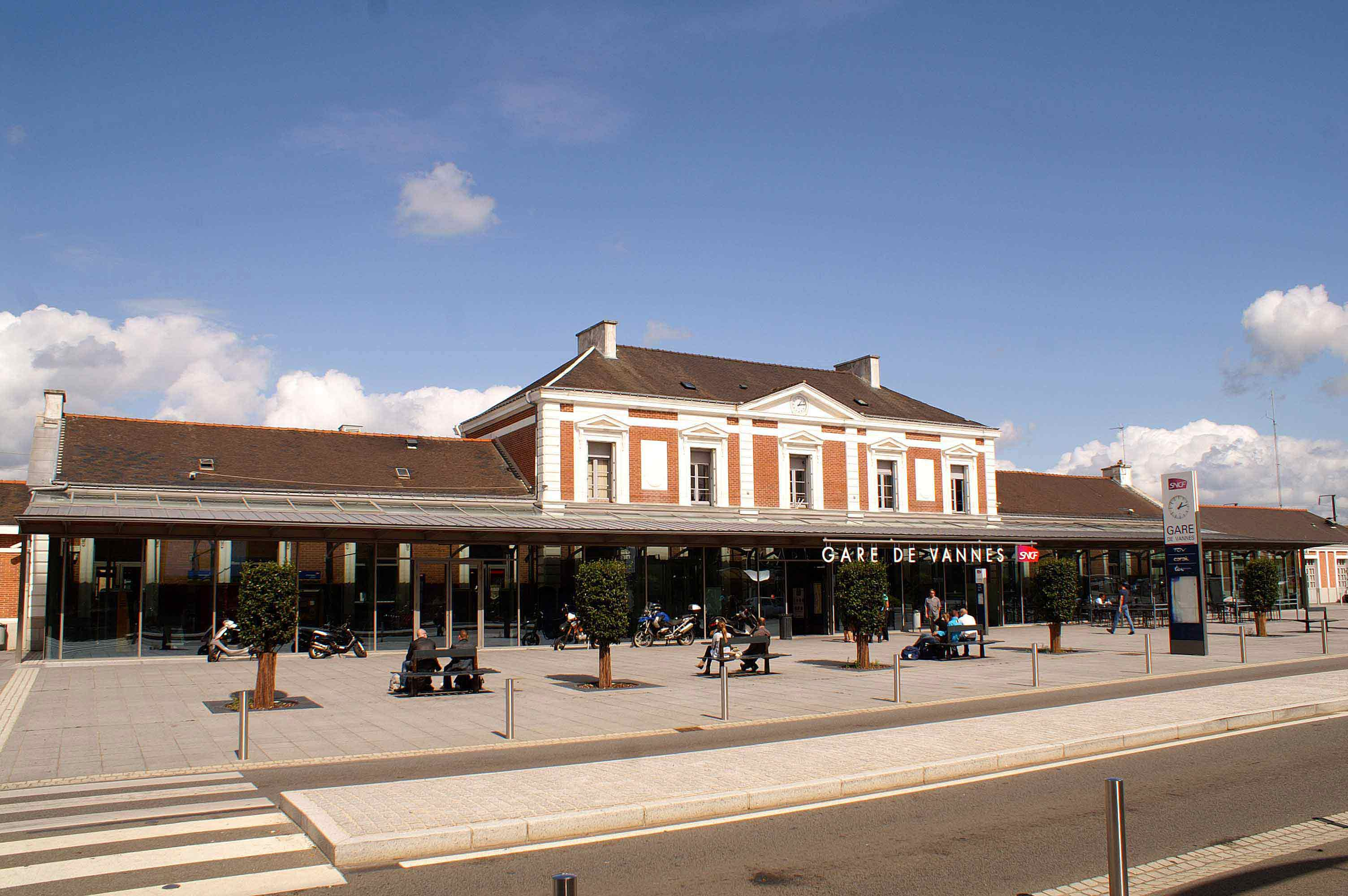
- Vannes railway station

General information
- Location: Vannes, Morbihan, Brittany, France
- Coordinates: 47°39′55″N 2°45′9″W
- Line: Savenay–Landerneau railway
- Platforms: 3
- Tracks: 8

Other information
- Station code: 87476606

History
- Opened: 21 September 1862

Passengers
- 2024: 2,313,942

Services
Preceding station	SNCF	Following station
Auray towards Quimper	TGV	Redon towards Montparnasse
Preceding station	TER Bretagne	Following station
Auray towards Quimper	2	Questembert towards Rennes
Auray towards Quimper	3	Questembert towards Nantes
Terminus	15	Questembert towards Rennes
Sainte-Anne towards Quimper	19	Terminus
Location

Vannes is a railway station in Vannes, Brittany, France. The station was opened on 21 September 1862 is located on the Savenay–Landerneau railway. Today, the station is served by TGV (high speed), Intercités (long distance) and TER (local) services operated by the SNCF.

== Train services ==
The station is served by high speed trains to Quimper and Paris, and regional trains to Quimper, Lorient, Nantes and Rennes.

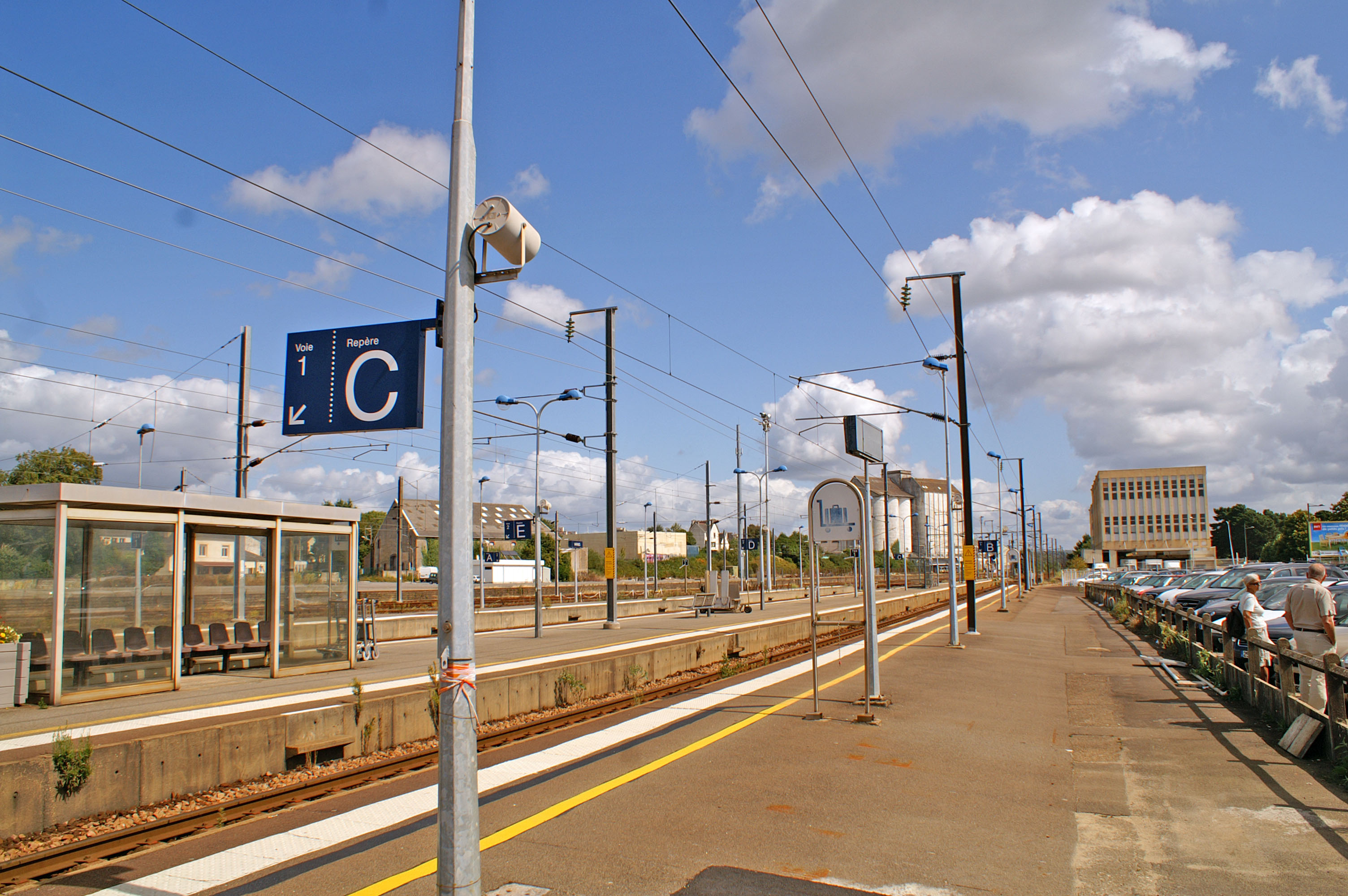
Vannes station looking east

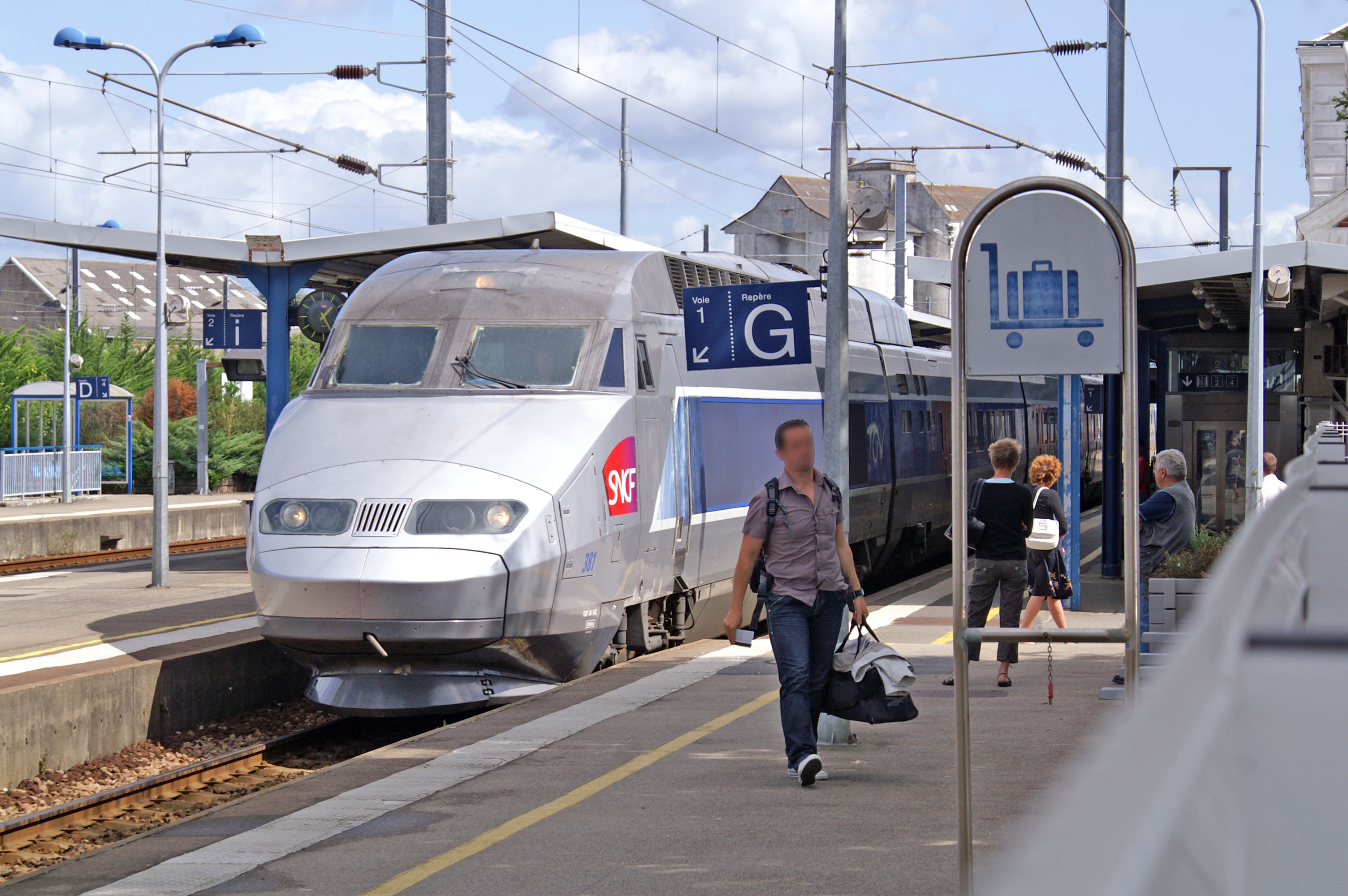
TGV at Vannes
