= Quimper station =

Railway station in Quimper, France

Quimper Kemper
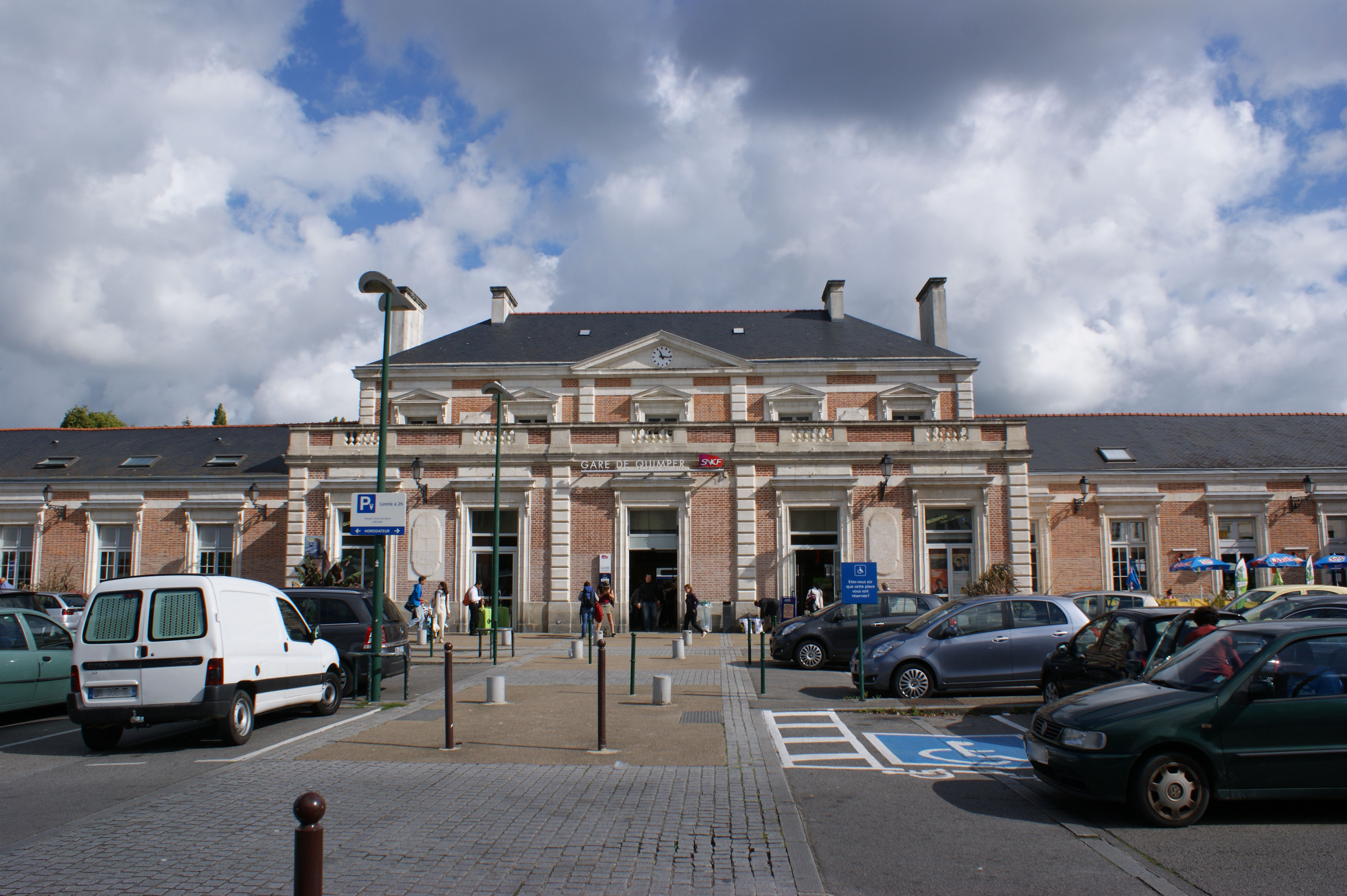
- Quimper railway station entrance

General information
- Location: Quimper, Finistère, Brittany, France
- Coordinates: 47°59′41″N 4°5′32″W
- Line: Savenay–Landerneau railway

Other information
- Station code: 87474098

History
- Opened: 8 September 1863

Passengers
- 2024: 1,753,601
Location

Quimper is a railway station in Quimper, Brittany, France. The station was opened on 8 September 1863, and it is located on the Savenay–Landerneau railway. Today, the station is served by TGV (high speed), Intercités (long distance) and TER (local) services operated by the SNCF.

== Train services ==
The station is served by high speed trains to Vannes and Paris, and regional trains to Brest, Lorient, Nantes and Rennes.

Preceding station	SNCF	Following station
Terminus	TGV	Lorient towards Montparnasse
Preceding station	TER Bretagne	Following station
Terminus	2	Rosporden towards Rennes
Terminus	3	Rosporden towards Nantes
Terminus	19	Rosporden towards Vannes
Châteaulin towards Brest	31	Terminus
