= LGV Atlantique =

French high-speed railway

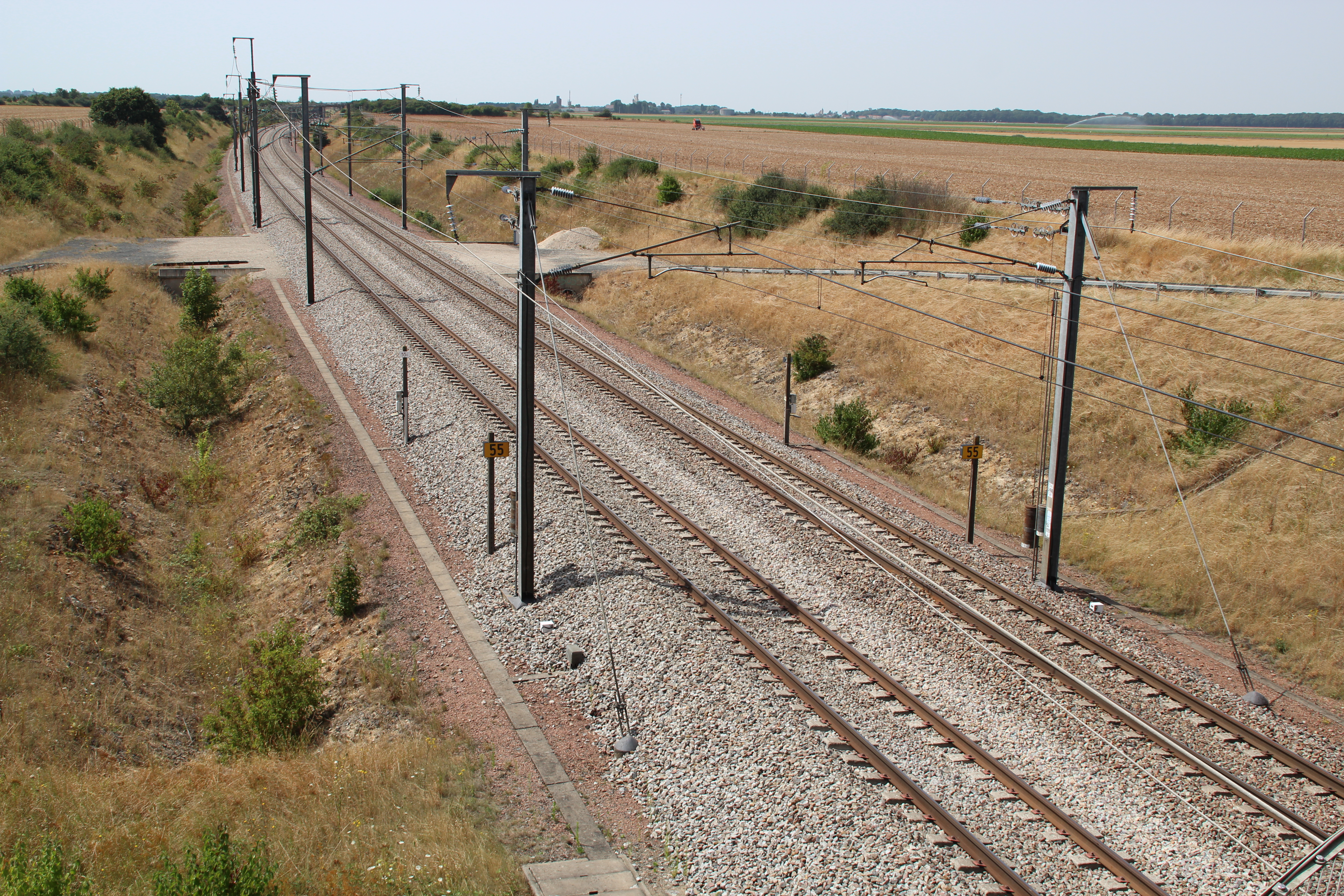
- The LGV Atlantique in Boinville-le-Gaillard

Overview
- Status: Operational
- Owner: SNCF Réseau
- Locale: Île-de-France, Centre-Val de Loire and Pays de la Loire
- Termini: Gare Montparnasse, Paris; Western branch: Le Mans; Southwestern branch: Tours

Service
- System: SNCF

History
- Opened: 24 September 1989 (Paris–Le Mans); 25 September 1990 (full line)

Technical
- Line length: 232 km (144 mi) (main line); 52 km (32 mi) (western branch)
- Num of tracks: 2
- Track gauge: 1,435 mm (4 ft 8 1/2 in) standard gauge
- Electrification: Overhead line, 25 kV 50 Hz AC
- Operating speed: 300 km/h (186 mph)
- Signalling: TVM-300

The LGV Atlantique (French: Ligne à Grande Vitesse Atlantique; English: Atlantic high-speed line) is a high-speed rail line running from Gare Montparnasse in Paris towards the Atlantic coast of France. It opened in 1989–1990 and has two intermediate stations: Massy TGV station and Vendôme-Villiers-sur-Loir TGV station. It divides into two parts at Courtalain, one going westward to Le Mans (towards Brittany and Pays de la Loire), the second one going southwestward to Tours (and onward towards Nouvelle-Aquitaine). Both branches have been extended, by the LGV Bretagne-Pays de la Loire and the LGV Sud Europe Atlantique.

== History ==
The first French high speed line, LGV Sud-Est, was opened to the public on 27 September 1981. It was an instant success, ten million passengers were recorded as travelling on the line within its first ten months. Furthermore, its operations validated the functionality and effectiveness of the new high speed rail technology available to SNCF, as well as the financing model for its deployment, which was via debt held by SNCF and did not depend upon any subsidies. The positive results of LGV Sud Est encouraged the French government to pursue the construction of additional high speed lines. LGV Atlantique would be the second high speed line to open in France.

=== Timeline ===
- 1 January 1983: creation of SNCF new line no. 2 committee
- 25 May 1984: public utility declaration
- 15 February 1985: official beginning of works at Boinville-le-Gaillard
- 1 July 1987: laying of first LGV Atlantique rail at Auneau
- 24 September 1989: line opens from Montrouge to Connerré
- 18 May 1990: TGV world speed record of 515.3 km/h
- 25 September 1990: southwestern branch opens

== Route ==
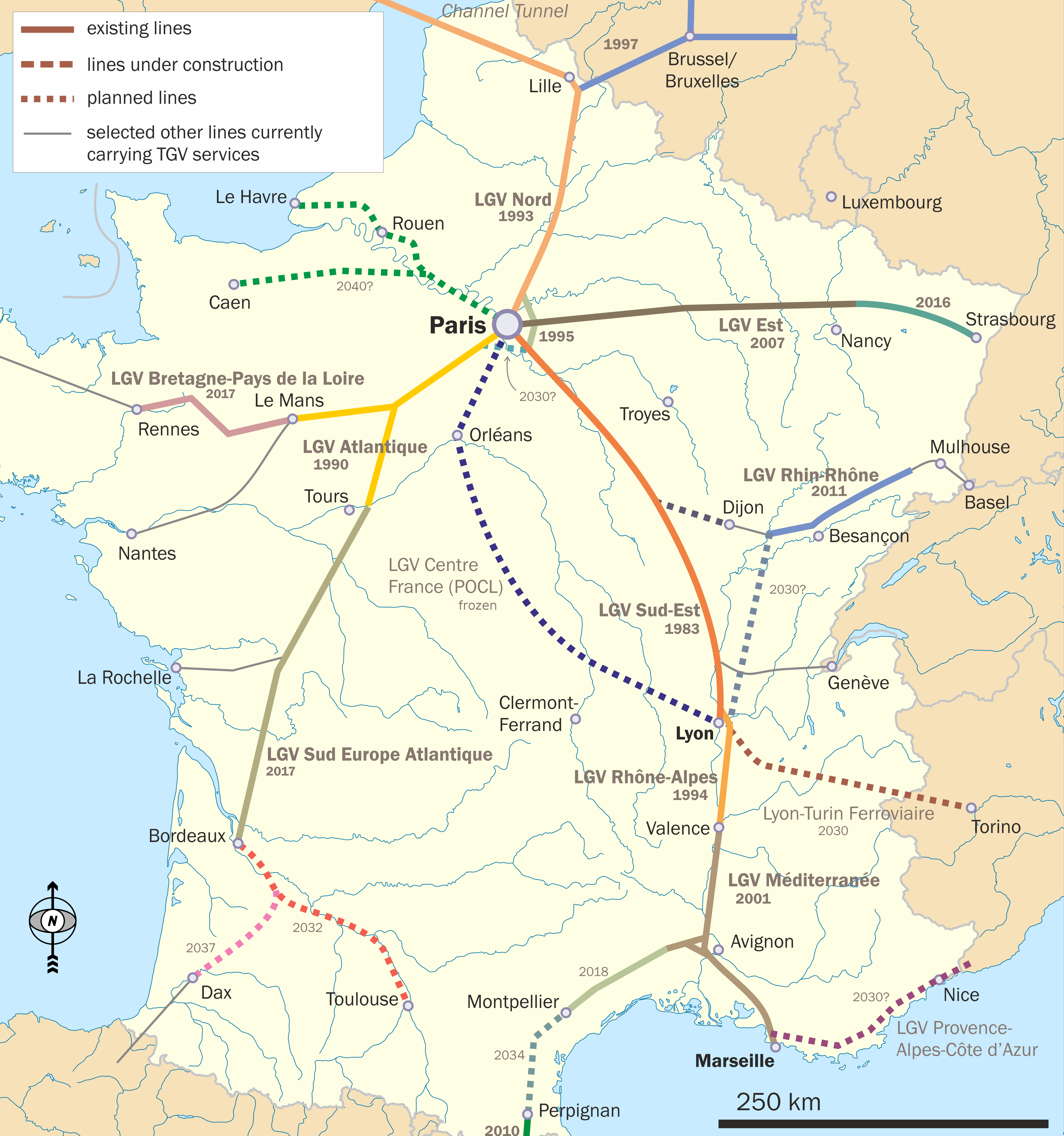
French TGV network, with the LGV Atlantique in yellow running south-west from Paris

The line leaves Gare Montparnasse to cross Paris's southern suburbs, partly under the Coulée Verte. This is a tunnel above which footpaths and recreational areas have been created, to reduce the effect of the LGV running through the area. The line at this point follows the route of the former railway line from Paris to Chartres. TGVs coming from the north or southeast of France via the LGV Interconnexion Est join the line at Massy. After the new Massy TGV station, the line passes through the Villejust tunnel and then follows the A10 motorway. Near the Saint-Arnoult toll plaza, the LGV turns south and leaves the motorway. The line then follows the ligne classique from Paris to Vendôme until the junction at Courtalain.

== Stations ==
The LGV Atlantique serves the following stations:

- Paris Montparnasse
- Massy TGV
- Le Mans^{1}
- Vendôme TGV
- Tours

^{1} Le Mans is located on the western branch of the LGV Atlantique.

== Extensions ==
Extensions to both branches have been built. The western branch is augmented by the LGV Bretagne-Pays de la Loire project, resulting in a reduction of 37 minutes between Paris and Rennes. The Southern branch is augmented by the LGV Sud Europe Atlantique project, resulting in a reduction of around 50 minutes to Tours and Bordeaux. Both lines entered service in July 2017.

== See also ==
- High-speed rail in France
