= Venta de Baños–Burgos–Vitoria high-speed rail line =

Rail line in Spain

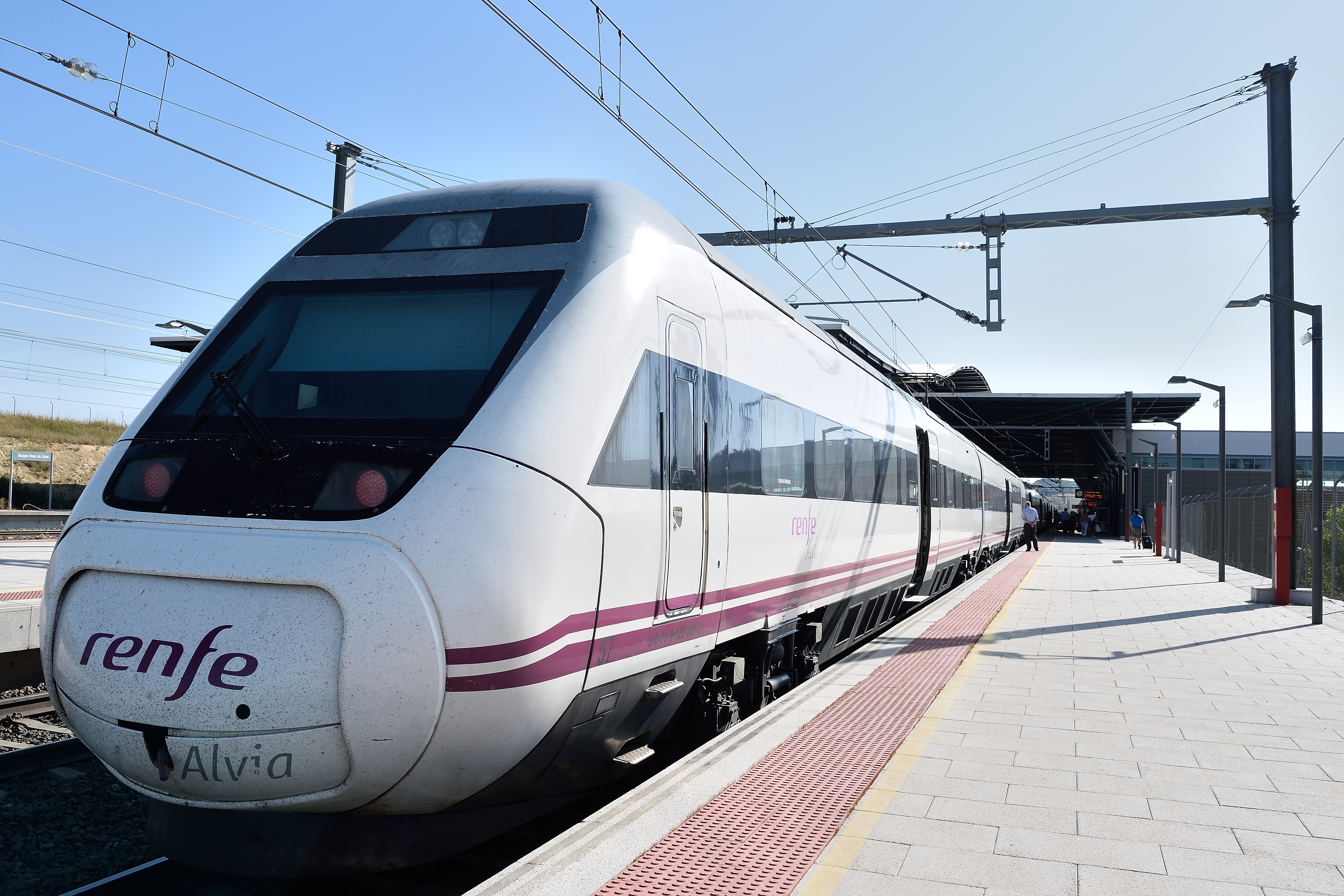
- Alvia train at Burgos Rosa Manzano station

Overview
- Status: Partially in service
- Owner: Adif
- Locale: Spain
- Termini: Venta de Baños; Vitoria
- Stations: 3

Service
- Type: High-speed rail line
- System: Spanish high-speed rail network
- Operator(s): Renfe

History
- Opened: 2022 (Venta de Baños–Burgos section)

Technical
- Number of tracks: Double-track (partially single-track in first phase)
- Character: Passenger
- Track gauge: 1,435 mm (4 ft 8 1/2 in)
- Electrification: 25 kV 50 Hz AC
- Operating speed: 350 km/h

The Venta de Baños–Burgos–Vitoria high-speed rail line is a partially completed high-speed rail line in Spain that connects the Venta de Baños junction (Palencia) with Vitoria via Burgos and Miranda de Ebro. It forms part of the northern/northwestern branch of Spain's high-speed rail network and is a section of the Madrid Chamartín–Bilbao Abando line. The Venta de Baños–Burgos section was inaugurated on July 21, 2022.

== Technical characteristics ==
The alignment between Venta de Baños junction and Burgos is designed according to European Union technical specifications for high-speed rail lines. Key features include:

- Maximum speed: 350 km/h
- Track gauge: 1,435 mm (4 ft 8 1/2 in) (Standard gauge)
- Infrastructure: Double-track platform, though single track was initially installed between Villamuriel de Cerrato - Soto de Cerrato branch and between Soto de Cerrato and Burgos to reduce costs
- Signaling: ERTMS Level 2 with ASFA backup
- Electrification: 25 kV 50 Hz AC

== Sections ==
=== Venta de Baños–Burgos ===
The operational section between Venta de Baños junction and the Burgos gauge changer spans 87.076 km, plus a 4.485 km branch line. The Venta de Baños junction consists of a triangle formed by:

- The Valladolid–León high-speed rail line (in service)
- The Venta de Baños–Burgos line
- A connecting branch from Palencia

Notable infrastructure elements include two semi-PAET (train overtaking and stabling points) at:

- Río Arlanzón (PK 257.565)
- Estépar (PK 282.378)

=== Burgos Bypass ===
The Burgos bypass measures 17.4 km between Aranda Junction and Rubena Junction. It features:

- Two Iberian gauge tracks with dual-gauge sleepers on a three-track platform
- 13.2 km of the route capable of 200 km/h operation
- Left track adapted to international gauge for high-speed services

A dual TCRS3 gauge changer (compatible with CAF and Talgo trains) is located at the northern exit of Burgos station, having been relocated from its originally planned position at Quintanilleja.

=== Burgos–Vitoria ===
The 96.6 km Burgos–Vitoria section is currently under development. In February 2025, Spain's Council of Ministers authorized a EUR 363 million tender for the construction of the first 8.4 km section between Pancorbo and Ameyugo. The remaining sections are scheduled to be tendered by 2026.

The line is structured into seven sections:

1. Burgos – Valle de las Navas railway variant
2. Valle de las Navas – Piérnigas
3. Piérnigas – Pancorbo
4. Pancorbo – Ameyugo
5. Ameyugo – Manzanos and integration in Miranda de Ebro
6. Manzanos – La Puebla de Arganzón
7. La Puebla de Arganzón – Iruña de Oca

77% of the line alignment runs through a succession of tunnels and viaducts, particularly in the mountainous areas of the Obarenes Mountains and the Pancorbo Gorge. Key infrastructure elements include:

- The 4 km Pancorbo tunnel through the Montes Obarenes
- A 1.1 km viaduct crossing the A-1 motorway, SC-BU-7 regional road, and Arroyo de la Llosa

The line will feature standard-gauge double track throughout, with a single-track bypass in Miranda de Ebro to allow both stopping and non-stop traffic patterns.

== Stations ==
=== Burgos Rosa Manzano ===
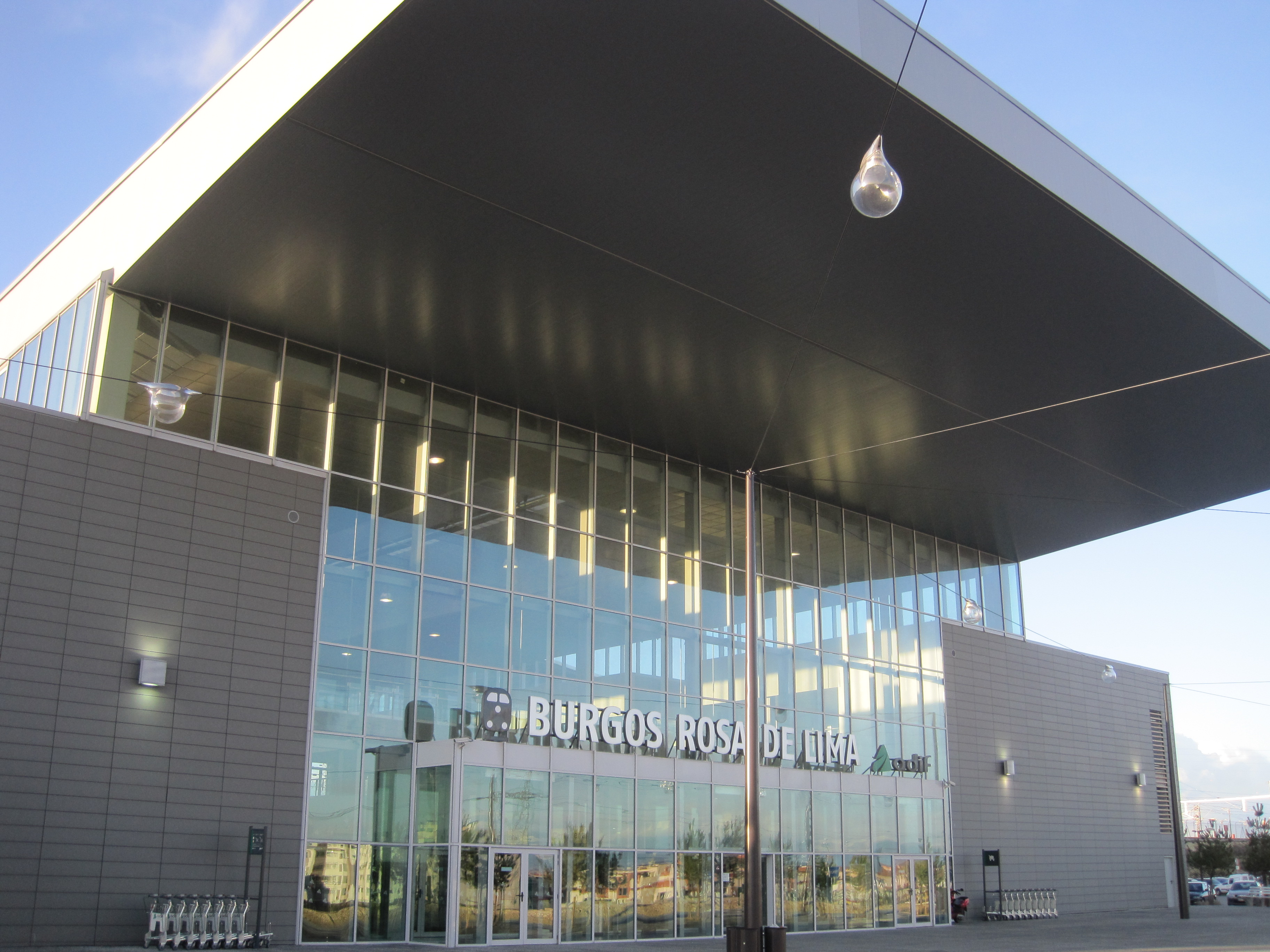
The Burgos Rosa Manzano station

The Burgos Rosa Manzano station is located in the north of Burgos and was officially opened on December 12, 2008. Built as part of the Burgos railway bypass to eliminate train traffic through the city center, the station features:

- Two Iberian gauge tracks between the first two platforms
- Two standard gauge tracks, one on the second platform and another on the last
- Two passing tracks without platforms between them

High-speed services began operating from the station on July 22, 2022, after several years of delays.

=== Miranda de Ebro ===
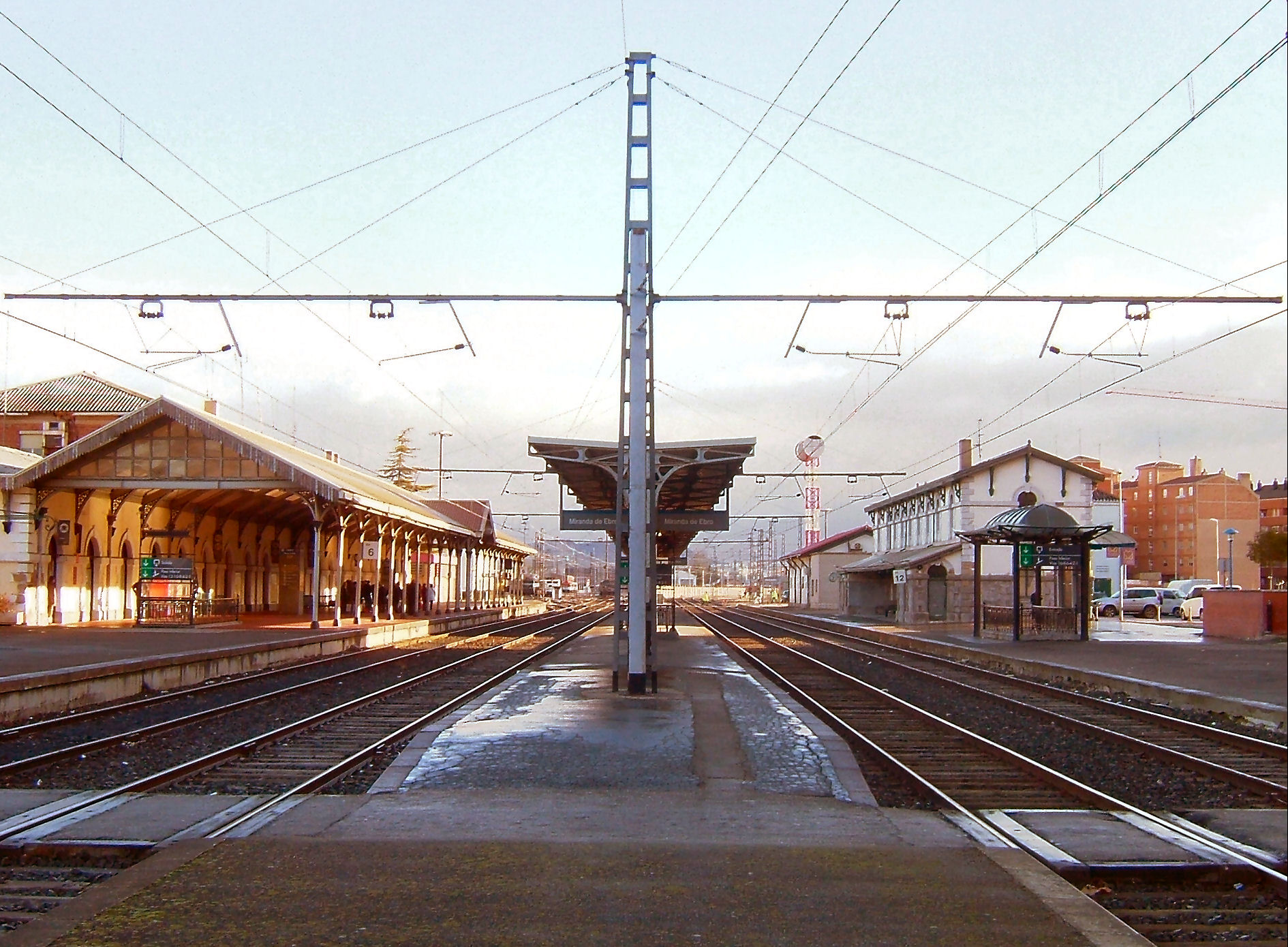
Miranda de Ebro station

Miranda de Ebro station is a significant railway junction where the Madrid–Irún and Castejón–Bilbao lines converge. Dating from 1862, it is one of Spain's oldest stations. The station will be preserved and renovated due to its historical value, with plans including:

- Rehabilitation of existing buildings for conventional rail services
- Integration with a new bus station
- Construction of a new high-speed terminal
- Installation of high-speed platforms around track 12 of the current station

=== Vitoria ===
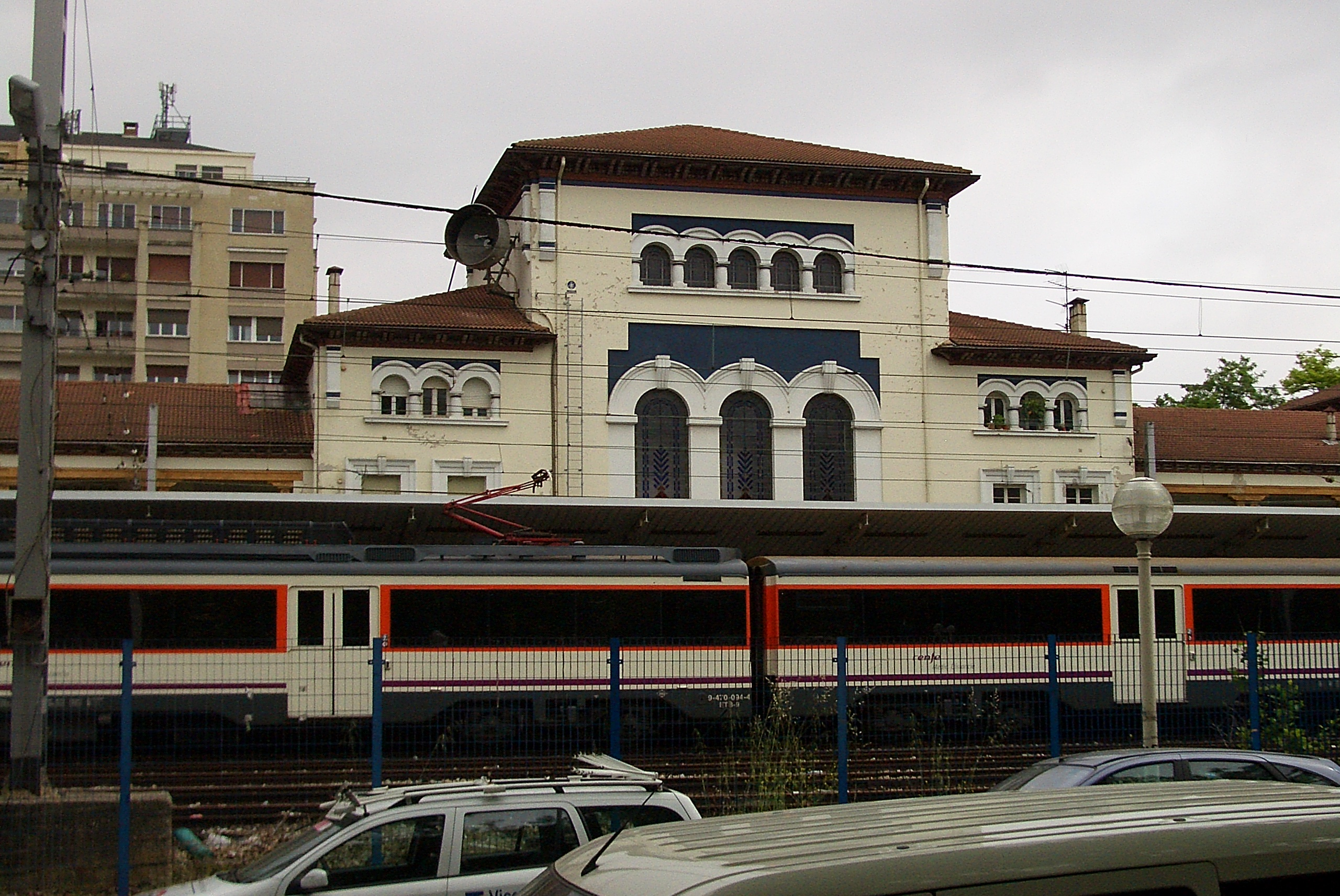
Vitoria station

Vitoria station, located in the city center, was inaugurated in 1935. The station will be integrated with the Basque Y high-speed network.

== Integration with Basque Y ==
The Burgos–Vitoria line will connect with the Basque Y high-speed network, a 180.5 km project linking Vitoria, Bilbao, and San Sebastián. The Basque Y consists of two main branches:

- Vitoria–Bilbao section (90.8 km)
- Bergara–San Sebastián–French border section (89.7 km)

The project features extensive tunneling and viaduct construction due to the mountainous terrain:

- 60% of the Vitoria–Bilbao section consists of special structures
- 80% of the Gipuzkoa branch runs through tunnels or viaducts
- The Vitoria–Bilbao section includes 44 viaducts and 23 tunnels
- Notable structures include the 4.8 km Albertia tunnel and a 1.4 km viaduct over the A-2620 road with piers up to 90 meters high

In July 2024, the European Investment Bank (EIB) provided a EUR 430 million loan to Adif Alta Velocidad for the Basque Y construction, including connections to the Burgos–Vitoria line and new stations in Vitoria-Gasteiz, Bilbao, and Donostia-San Sebastián. This represented the final tranche of a EUR 1.43 billion total loan package.

== Funding ==
The project is expected to receive European co-financing through the Connecting Europe Facility (CEF), reflecting its importance as part of the Atlantic Corridor and its role in connecting Spain's high-speed network to the French border.

== See also ==
- Madrid–Asturias high-speed rail line
- Basque Y
