= Vendôme–Villiers-sur-Loir TGV station =

High-speed railway station in central France

Vendôme Villiers-sur-Loir
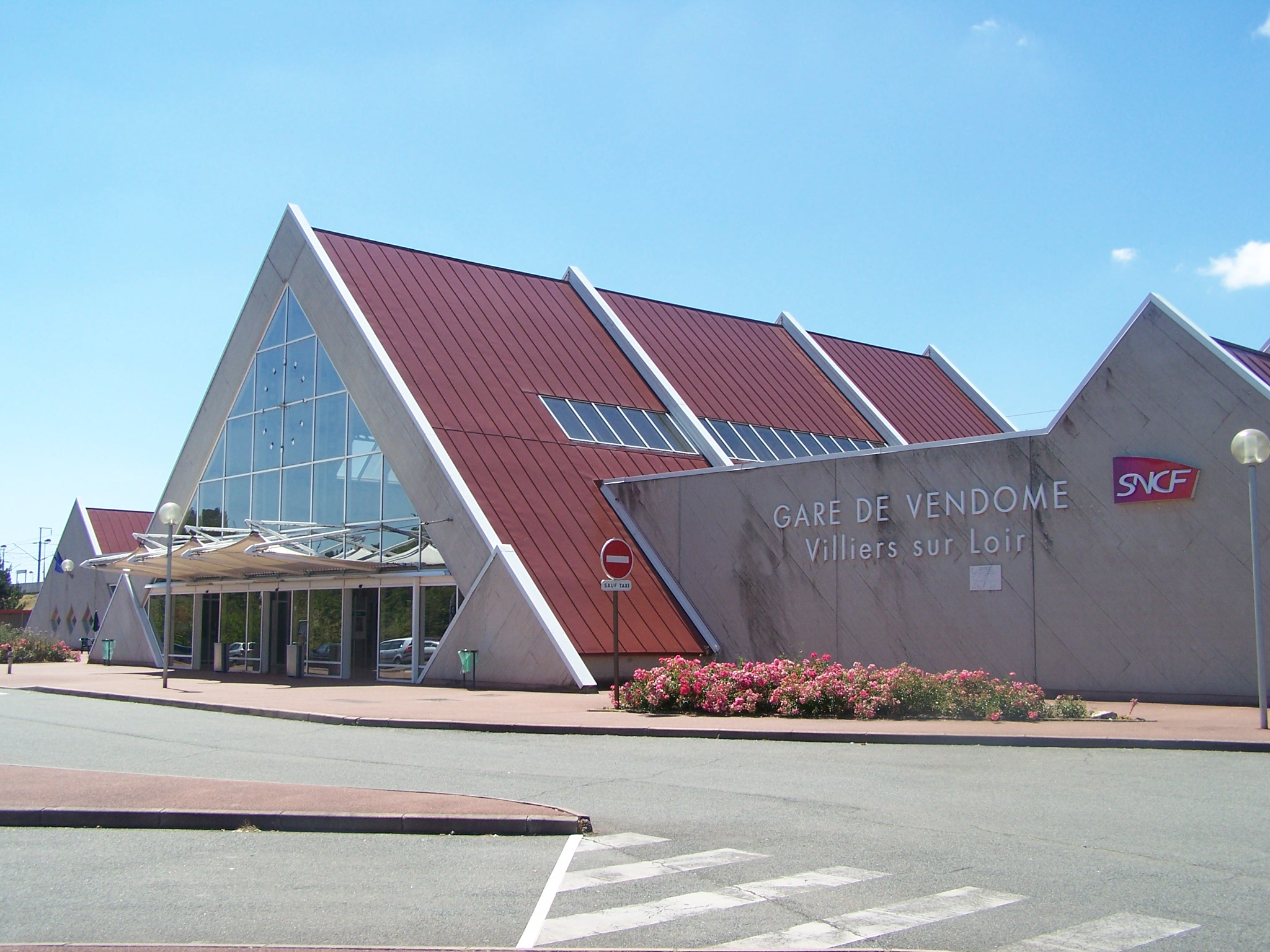
- Vendôme-Villiers-sur-Loir TGV railway station

General information
- Location: Vendôme and Villiers-sur-Loir, Loir-et-Cher, Centre-Val de Loire, France
- Coordinates: 47°49′19″N 1°1′15″E
- Line: LGV Atlantique
- Platforms: 2
- Tracks: 4

Other information
- Station code: 87571216

History
- Opened: 25 September 1990

Services
Preceding station	SNCF	Following station
Massy TGV towards Montparnasse	TGV	Saint-Pierre-des-Corps towards Poitiers
Massy TGV towards Montparnasse	TGV	Saint-Pierre-des-Corps towards Tours
Location

Vendôme–Villiers-sur-Loir TGV station is a high-speed railway station located in Vendôme and Villiers-sur-Loir, Loir-et-Cher, central France. The station was opened in 1990 and is located on the LGV Atlantique. The train services are operated by SNCF.

It is located 5 km northwest of Vendôme, closer to the small town Villiers-sur-Loir. The 178 km journey from Paris Montparnasse to Vendome TGV takes 42 minutes.

== Train services ==
The station is served by the following services:

- High speed services (TGV) Tours - Saint-Pierre-des-Corps - Paris
- High speed services (TGV) Poitiers - Saint-Pierre-des-Corps - Paris

== Bus services ==
- To Vendôme
- To Château-Renault
- To Mondoubleau
