= LGV Bordeaux–Spain =

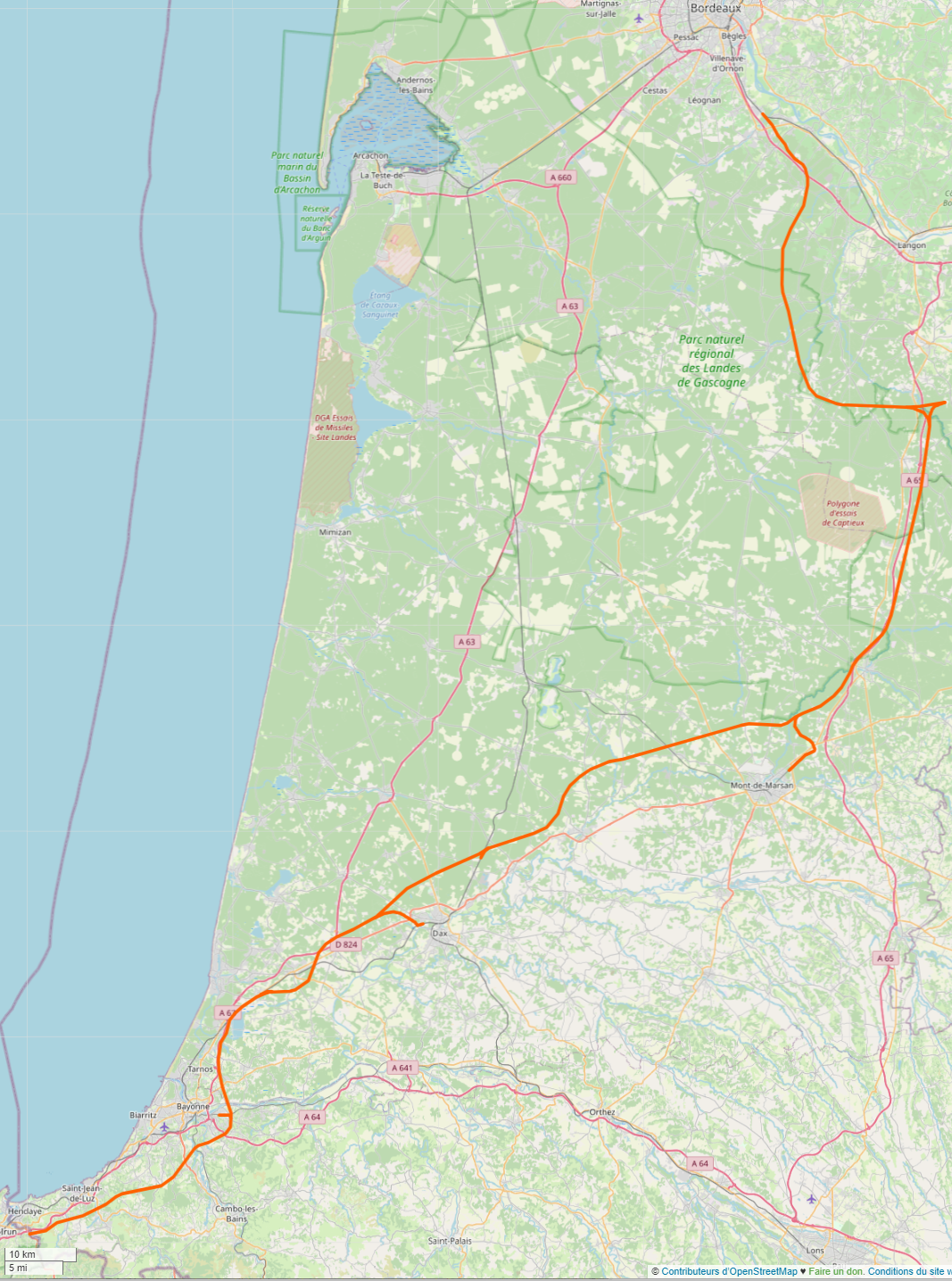
- Route of the planned LGV Bordeaux-Spain

Overview
- Native name: Ligne à Grande Vitesse Bordeaux–Espagne
- Status: Planned
- Owner: SNCF Réseau
- Locale: France
- Termini: Bordeaux; Spanish border near Hendaye
- Stations: 3 (planned)

Service
- Type: High-speed rail
- System: French high-speed rail network
- Operator(s): SNCF
- Rolling stock: TGV
- Ridership: 7.7 million (Phase 1 projected); 10.7 million (Phase 2 projected)

History
- Planned opening: Phase 1: 2034; Phase 2: Not determined

Technical
- Line length: 196 km (122 mi)
- Number of tracks: 2
- Character: Passenger and freight
- Track gauge: 1,435 mm (4 ft 8 1/2 in)
- Electrification: 25 kV 50 Hz AC
- Operating speed: 320 km/h (200 mph)
- Signalling: ETCS Level 2

The LGV Bordeaux–Spain (French: Ligne à Grande Vitesse Bordeaux–Espagne) is a planned high-speed railway that would connect Bordeaux to the Spanish border, reinforcing the connection between Madrid/Spain and Paris/France. The project was initiated primarily to address the growing freight traffic on the Spain-Bayonne-Bordeaux motorway, which doubles approximately every seven years (growing at about 10% annually). The line would serve as a link between the LGV Sud Europe Atlantique to the north and the "Basque Y" (connection between Vitoria-Gasteiz-Bilbao/San Sebastián) to the south.

The project is part of the larger Grand projet ferroviaire du Sud-Ouest. The 196-kilometer line is designed for both high-speed passenger service (TGV) and, in some sections, mixed passenger and freight traffic. The project is planned to be constructed in two phases: Phase 1 from Bordeaux to Dax (97 km) by 2034, and Phase 2 from Dax to the Spanish border (94 km) at a later date.

Construction costs are estimated at €3.7 billion for Phase 1 (as of 2022) and €4 billion for Phase 2 (as of 2013).

== Route ==
The line branches off from the LGV Bordeaux–Toulouse at Bernos-Beaulac in the southern part of the Gironde department. After following a common 55-kilometer stretch with the LGV Bordeaux-Toulouse, the lines split near Bernos-Beaulac. The route then passes through Mont-de-Marsan, Dax, and continues toward the Spanish border at Hendaye.

Map of the LGV Bordeaux-Spain route options. Green: LGV Sud Europe Atlantique. Black: existing line that was considered for expansion to four tracks. Blue: western option along the A63. Red: eastern option through Mont-de-Marsan (selected). Purple: common section from Dax to the Spanish border.

Three new stations are planned for the line:

- A new TGV station north of Mont-de-Marsan
- Two regional express stations: one south of the junction with the LGV Bordeaux-Toulouse in Escaudes, and one west of Dax in Saint-Geours-de-Maremne

=== Phase 1: Sud-Gironde–Dax ===
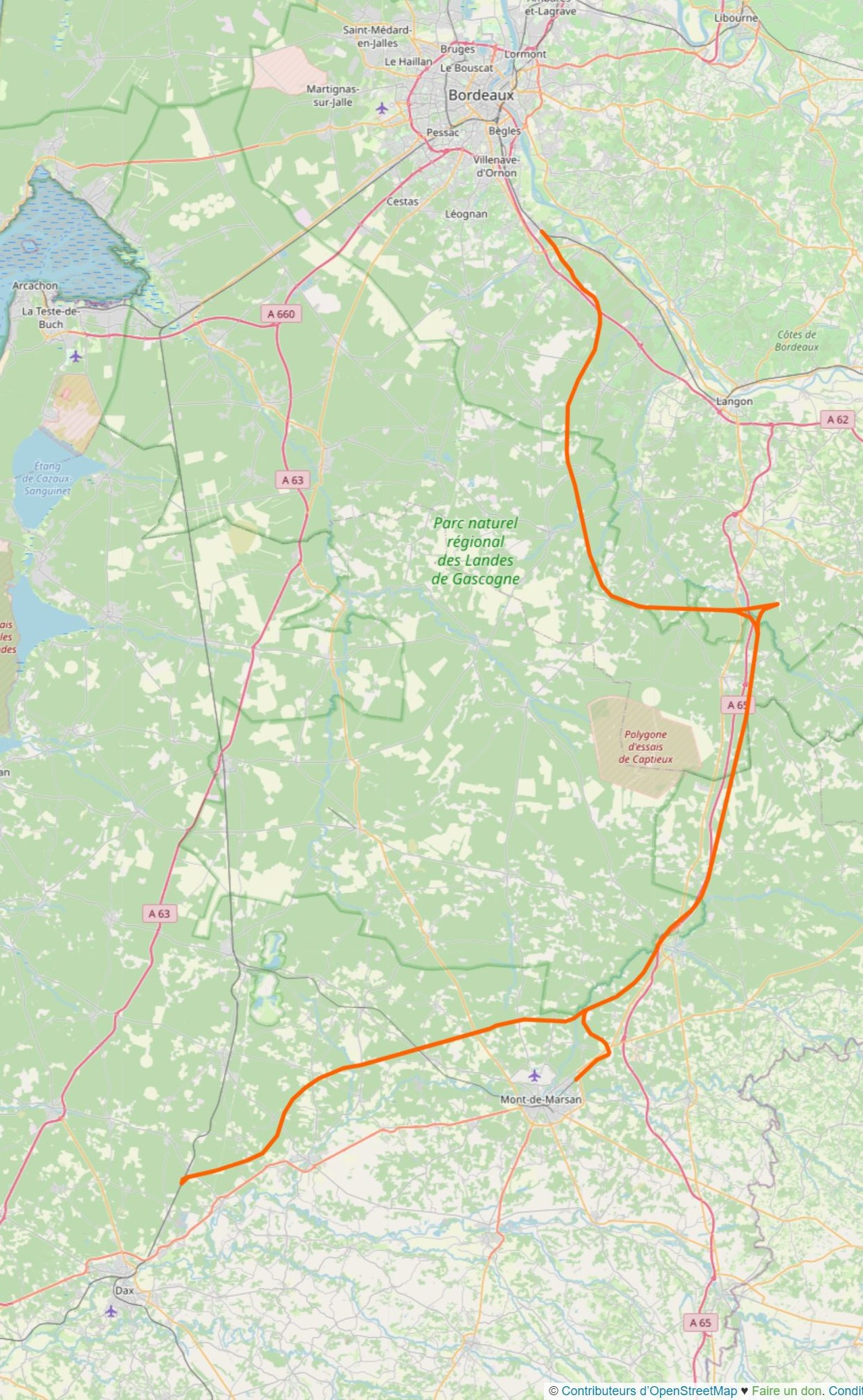
Detailed alignment of Phase 1 of the LGV Bordeaux-Spain (Bordeaux-Dax section), showing connections to existing rail network.

The line branches off at Bernos-Beaulac from the LGV Bordeaux-Toulouse and turns south. The new Sud-Gironde station for regional express services is planned immediately after this junction. The route runs partially alongside the A65 motorway through the Landes de Gascogne Regional Natural Park until it curves westward just before Mont-de-Marsan. The new Mont-de-Marsan station is planned in the municipality of Lucbardez-et-Bargues. To connect with regional services from the current Mont-de-Marsan station, a single-track connecting line of approximately 8.9 km will be built.

Continuing southwestward, the line runs relatively straight, bypassing Mont-de-Marsan to the north. Near the municipalities of Pontonx-sur-l'Adour and Laluque, it reaches the existing Bordeaux-Irun line with a grade-separated junction toward Dax. The Bordeaux-Dax route via the new line is approximately 34 km longer than the existing line.

=== Phase 2: Dax–Spanish Border ===
At the Laluque junction, a connection for freight trains heading toward the Spanish border will be created onto the new line. The Dax agglomeration will be bypassed to the northwest, with another connection for passenger trains serving Dax station joining from the existing line in Rivière-Saas-et-Gourby. The new Côte-Landaise station for regional express services will be located at kilometer 190.77. After bypassing Saint-Vincent-de-Tyrosse to the south, the line runs parallel to the existing Bordeaux-Irun line for about 5 km. In this area, a junction to the existing line will be created for passenger trains serving Bayonne and Biarritz stations.

From Labenne, the route turns south, closely following the A63 motorway for about 7 km. The Adour river valley is crossed by a 2,860-meter-long viaduct. Immediately after, a connection from the Toulouse-Bayonne line is created for trains from Bayonne toward Spain. The line then reaches the foothills of the Pyrenees, necessitating numerous bridges and tunnels. Of the 34 km section from kilometer 225 to 259, approximately 14.8 km runs through tunnels (mining and cut-and-cover) and 4.5 km on bridges and viaducts. At kilometer 259.06, the border river La Bidasoa is reached. The continuation on the Spanish side toward Vitoria-Gasteiz is planned under the name "Basque Y."

== Time savings ==
The Grand Projet Ferroviaire du Sud-Ouest will reduce travel times as shown in the following table:

	Currently	After the "Basque Y"	After GPSO Phase 1 (Bordeaux-Dax/Toulouse)	After GPSO Phase 2 (Dax-border)
Bordeaux-Bayonne	1h45		1h15	1h05
Bordeaux-Bilbao	4h30*	3h15	2h55	1h55
Bordeaux-Madrid	9h*	5h15	4h55	3h55
Paris-Bayonne	3h55		3h25	3h15
Paris-Madrid	9h00 via Barcelona	7h25	7h05	6h05
Toulouse-Bayonne	3h30		2h25	2h15

- Journey times marked with an asterisk are currently made by coach, as no efficient rail service exists on these routes.

Travel times for connections do not account for train schedules.

== Infrastructure ==
The line has a total length of 196 km and is designed for speeds up to 320 km/h. The sections north and south of Dax were designed differently due to topography and traffic requirements.

The track utilizes UIC 60 rails with monoblock sleepers. The crossovers (points de changement de voie, PCV) are designed for speeds up to 170 km/h. Three operational stations (points de changements de voie avec évitement, PCVE) will be built at Carsen-Ponson (km 155.98), St-Geours-de-Maremne (km 189.79), and St-Pée-sur-Nivelle (km 243.77), each with an overtaking track with emergency platform and operational tracks for line maintenance.

The new Mont-de-Marsan station will have two 400-meter platform tracks and two middle tracks for passing trains, with two separate tracks for regional traffic on the side. The Sud-Gironde and Côte-Landaise stations will serve exclusively regional express traffic, with two 200-meter platform tracks and two middle tracks for passing trains.

The line will be electrified with alternating current (25 kV, 50 Hz). Three new substations will be built in Retjons (approx. km 101), Lesgor (approx. km 159), and Arcangues (approx. km 239). The line will be equipped exclusively with the ETCS Level 2 train protection system.

=== Phase 1: Sud-Gironde–Dax ===
The 97-km section from Triangle Sud-Gironde to the junction north of Dax is designed for a speed of 350 km/h and intended for use by fast freight trains (v≥160 km/h), with a track spacing of 4.80 m. The minimum curve radius is generally 5,900 m.

The Sud-Sud connecting curve is approximately 5.6 km long and allows a maximum speed of 230 km/h. An 8.9-km connecting line is planned to link the new Mont-de-Marsan station to the existing network.

=== Phase 2: Dax–Spanish Border ===
The 94-km section from the Nord de Dax junction to the Spanish border is designed as a mixed-traffic line (passenger traffic up to 320 km/h and freight traffic up to 120 km/h). South of the Saint-Vincent-de-Tyrosse junction (toward Bayonne), the maximum speed is 220 km/h. A total of approximately 15.5 km of connecting lines will be built to link with the existing line.

== Operation ==
The new line will enable high-speed passenger service (TGV) from Bordeaux, Mont-de-Marsan, Dax, Bayonne, Biarritz, and Hendaye, as well as connections with regional services (TER) at the new Sud-Gironde and Mont-de-Marsan stations.

This will allow for expanded service with more train pairs and new connections. The travel time between Bordeaux and Dax will be reduced from the current 1:09 h (as of 2023) to 0:53 h with up to 12 daily train pairs. Between Bordeaux and Bayonne, the time savings is estimated at 40 minutes (including Phase 2). The Sud-Sud connecting curve will reduce travel times between Toulouse and southern Aquitaine (Dax, Bayonne) by at least 1:30 hours. Upon completion of Phase 2 and the extension on the Spanish side, the travel time from Paris to Madrid is expected to fall to 6:05 h, with 3 direct train pairs planned per day.

With the opening of the first section, approximately 7.7 million passengers per year are expected, representing growth of about 2 million compared to the scenario without the new line. With the opening of the second phase to the Spanish border, 10.7 million passengers are expected annually, of which approximately 2 million will be cross-border travelers.

== History ==
=== Early studies ===
Between 2002 and 2004, the high-speed line was the subject of official studies. Several route options in the Bordeaux-Dax section were under consideration:

- Expansion of the existing Bordeaux-Irun line to four tracks
- New line along the A63 motorway
- New line east of the Landes with service to Mont-de-Marsan

Public hearings (débat public) for the project were held in the second half of 2005. Based on the results, the board of the French network company Réseau Ferré de France (RFF, now SNCF Réseau) decided on March 8, 2007, to pursue the eastern Landes variant with a new station for Mont-de-Marsan.

On May 21, 2007, the local authorities of the Midi-Pyrénées region agreed on the distribution of their cost contribution. On January 11, 2010, RFF published the route alignment specified to one kilometer. On January 9, 2012, the steering committee, composed of representatives from the Midi-Pyrénées and Aquitaine regions, the relevant national ministers, and the president of RFF, approved the final route.

In a report published in June 2013, the Mobilité 21 Commission recommended constructing the line in two phases. The Bordeaux-Dax section, bundled with the LGV Bordeaux-Toulouse up to Bernos-Beaulac, was to be completed by 2027. The extension to the Spanish border (Phase 2) would follow later, with planned commissioning by 2032 at the latest.

=== Planning Phase 1 ===
The public consultation phase for the first phase began on October 14, 2014. The declaration of public utility (déclaration d'utilité publique) was issued on June 2, 2016. Appeals against it were upheld by the Administrative Court of Bordeaux on June 29, 2017, and by the Administrative Court of Toulouse on June 15, 2018; however, these judgments were overturned by the appeals court in 2019 and 2020. The public interest was also confirmed by the Conseil d'État on April 11, 2018.

In March 2022, the financing plan for the Bordeaux-Dax line was signed by the French state and local authorities. It includes a total investment of €3.7 billion (current euros), with the French state and local authorities each contributing 40%, and the remaining 20% to be provided by the European Union. Commissioning is planned for after 2032, with the construction start date not yet determined.

=== Recent developments ===
In January 2025, SNCF Réseau began modernizing the "Midi" catenary system on the existing Dax-Bayonne line, which will interface with the future LGV. This €190 million project, funded by the EU (14%) and SNCF Réseau (86%), will continue until 2031 to prepare for increased traffic along this corridor. The timing aligns with the planned 2034 opening of Phase 1 of the LGV Bordeaux–Spain, suggesting coordination between upgrading existing infrastructure and developing new high-speed sections.

== Timeline ==
- 2002-2003: Preliminary studies on the project's feasibility
- December 18, 2003: Project selected by the interministerial committee for territorial planning and development
- June 7 - November 25, 2005: Public debate
- April 13, 2006: Decision by Réseau Ferré de France to continue studies
- January 11, 2010: RFF reveals the 1,000-meter corridor defining almost the entirety of the Bordeaux-Toulouse and Bordeaux-Spain lines
- March 30, 2012: Validation by the Ministry of Transport of the future high-speed line
- October 14, 2014: Opening of public inquiries
- June 2, 2016: Declaration of public utility by decree
- June 29, 2017: Cancellation of the declaration of public utility for the Bordeaux-Saint-Jean to Saint-Médard d'Eyrans section by the Bordeaux administrative court
- February 2, 2018: The Infrastructure Orientation Council report deems the project a priority and proposes phasing with a possible delay until 2027 in the most favorable case
- October 17, 2019: The entire initial project is back on track with the reinstatement of the Bordeaux-Saint-Jean to Saint-Médard d'Eyrans section in the DUP by the Bordeaux administrative court of appeal
- December 24, 2019: Promulgation of the mobility orientation law, allowing the creation of project companies for line financing
- March 2, 2022: The Grand Projet du Sud Ouest company (encompassing the LGV Bordeaux-Toulouse and Bordeaux-Spain lines) is created

== Opposition to the project ==
A local referendum was organized in several towns (Biriatou, Arcangues, and Saint-Pée-sur-Nivelle). 85% of voters expressed their opposition to this project. However, this opposition was considered selfish by the former mayor of Anglet, Alain Lamassoure. In June 2023, a demonstration against the project took place in Gironde.

== See also ==
- LGV Bordeaux–Toulouse
- LGV Sud Europe Atlantique
- Grand Projet Ferroviaire du Sud-Ouest (GPSO)
- Basque Y
