= LGV Bretagne-Pays de la Loire =

French high-speed railway

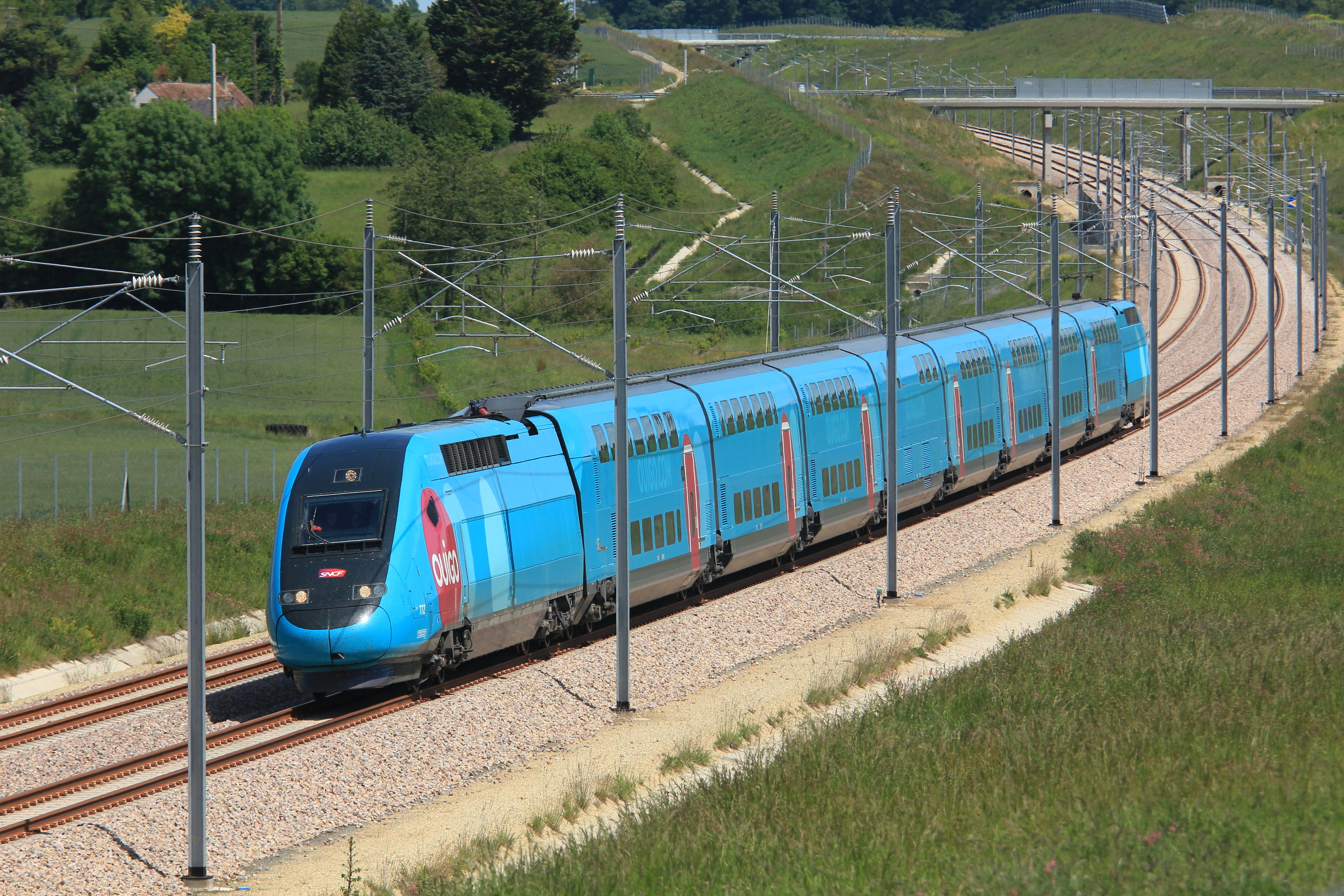
- Ouigo TGV Duplex in Chantenay-Villedieu

Overview
- Status: Operational
- Owner: SNCF Réseau
- Locale: Brittany and Pays de la Loire, France
- Termini: LGV Atlantique western branch near Connerré; Cesson-Sévigné near Rennes

Service
- System: SNCF
- Operator: SNCF

History
- Opened: 2 July 2017

Technical
- Line length: 214 km (133 mi): 182 km (113 mi) (newly built) + 32 km (20 mi) (connection to existing network)
- Num of tracks: Double track
- Track gauge: 1,435 mm (4 ft 8 1/2 in) standard gauge
- Electrification: 25 kV 50 Hz
- Operating speed: 320 km/h (200 mph)
- Signalling: ERTMS level 2

The LGV Bretagne-Pays de la Loire (LGV BPL, English : Brittany–Loire Valley High-Speed Line) is a French high-speed rail line running between Connerré, Sarthe near Le Mans and Cesson-Sévigné, Ille-et-Vilaine near Rennes.

Studied as early as 1996, processes towards LGV Brittany-Pays de la Loire commenced during 2005 with initial land acquisitions. Following agreements over its financing, an invitation to tender was issued by French infrastructure manager Réseau Ferré de France (RFF) during December 2008.

On 18 January 2011, an RFF spokesperson announced that Eiffage had been selected as the preferred bidder for the project. After the LGV Sud Europe Atlantique, it was only the second high-speed line to be developed through a public private partnership (PPP) arrangement in France. On 27 July 2012, construction of the LGV Bretagne-Pays de la Loire officially commenced. The completed line was opened on 2 July 2017 by President Emmanuel Macron; it is operated by TGV services provided by the SNCF, France's national railway company.

== History ==
=== Background ===
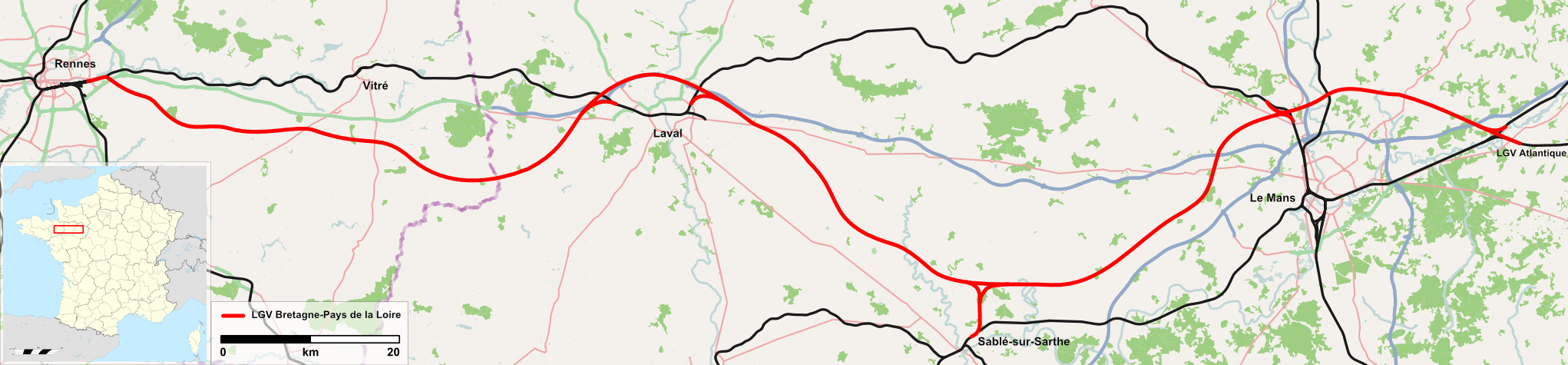
Map of the LGV BPL

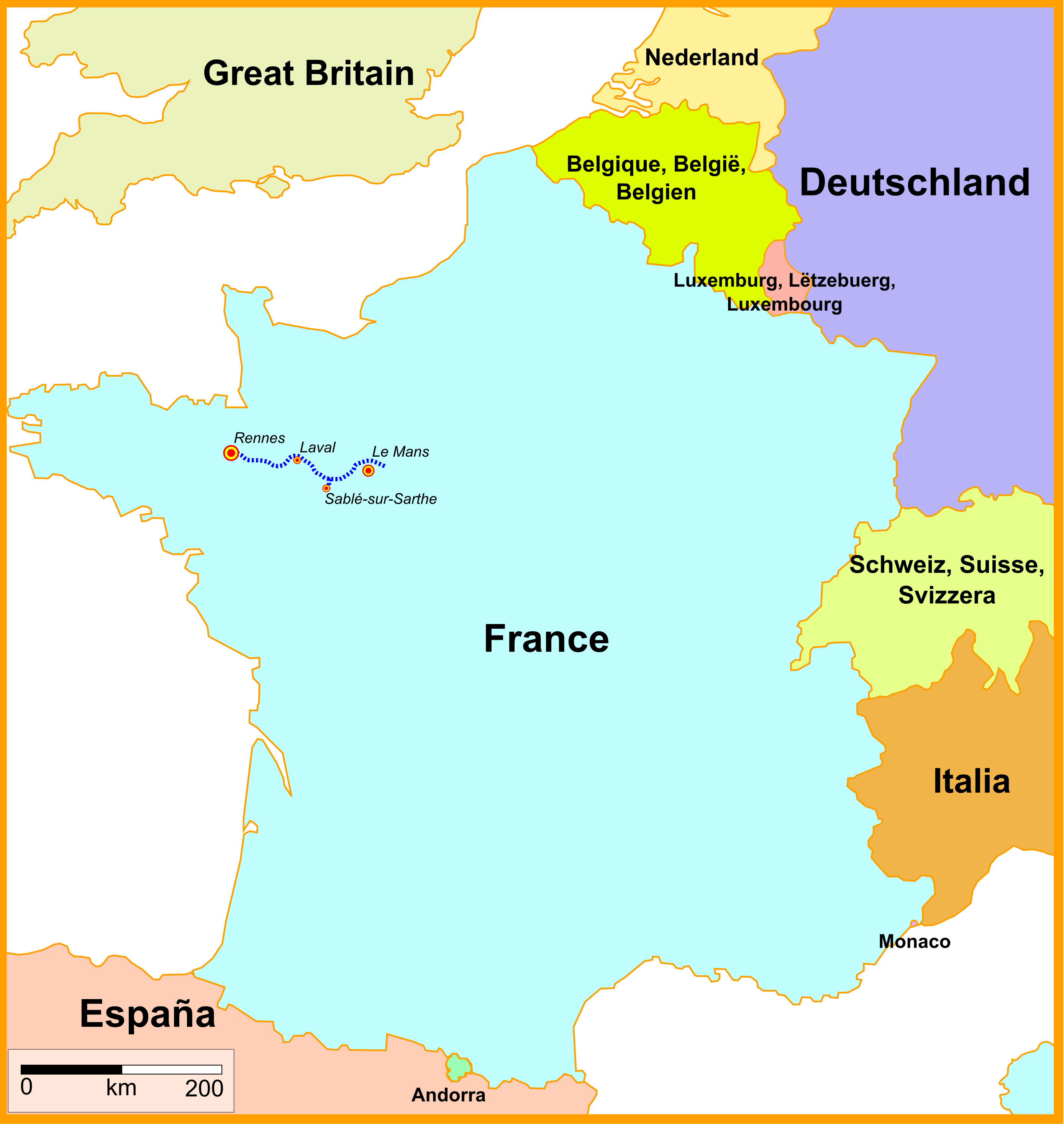
The LGV's situation in France

Between 1996 and 2001, French infrastructure manager Réseau Ferré de France (RFF) conducted preliminary studies into the potential construction of a 182 km (113 mi) extension of the LGV Atlantique's western branch, later known as LGV Bretagne-Pays de la Loire. During 2005, the process of acquiring land along the intended route was started. On 30 October 2007, it was announced that the proposed line had been granted a Declaration of Public Utility, a sign of formal recognition by the French government and a necessary step for any major publicly funded construction programme in France; at the time, this envisioned line had a reported cost of around €2.5 billion and would achieve an estimated reduction in journey time of 37 minutes between Paris and Brittany over the conventional route being used at that time. The proposal also become a recognised element of France's rail expansion strategy under the Grenelle Environnement initiative.

On 29 July 2008, reports emerged that the broad financing for the line's construction had been agreed between the various bodies involved. Under this arrangement, the French Government was reportedly set to contribute €990 million, which was to be matched by contributions from the regional government as well; the remaining €1.02 billion was to be provided out of RFF's own resources. By this point, it was being reported that the envisioned high speed line had an increased projected total cost of €3.4 billion, and that roughly 90 per cent of the land required for its construction had been already acquired. The proposed LGV Bretagne-Pays de la Loire was personally highlighted by President Nicolas Sarkozy as one of four grand projects which were to be a recipient of funding under a national economic stimulus package that was issued by his government.

During December 2008, an invitation to tender was issued for what was referred to as 'partnership contract' to construct LGV Bretagne-Pays de la Loire; the first round of bids were submitted by May 2009. On 19 June 2009, RFF President Hubert du Mesniland announced that, following an assessment of the competing bids submitted, a total of three groups had been short-listed: a consortium led by Bouygues TP, Eiffage, and a consortium led by Vinci Concessions. By this point, RFF had provided the three selected groups with further technical documentation on the project, while the completion of the full consultation documents was still pending. The final bids from the shortlisted firms were received in advance of 13 October 2009. On 18 January 2011, an RFF spokesperson announced that Eiffage had been selected as the preferred bidder for the project. Reportedly, it had won on the basis of five criteria: cost, the financing package's assessed robustness, technical quality and environmental impact of the proposed work, the timetable for construction activity, and the opportunities available to third party small and medium-sized companies. At the time, it was stated that Eiffage and RFF were expected to sign a contract to finalised this arrangement during the first quarter of 2011.

On 28 July 2011, the 25-year public–private partnership (PPP) contract, valued at €3·3 billion, which covered the construction and maintenance of LGV Bretagne-Pays de la Loire was signed in Paris by RFF President Hubert du Mesniland and Pierre Berger, the Managing Director of Eiffage. The arrangement covered not only the 182 km (113 mi) high speed line that would be newly built between Le Mans and Rennes, but also an additional 32 km (20 mi) of connecting track between the new line and the existing railway network. One day later, an associated funding agreement for the programme was signed by the Minister for Ecology, Energy, Sustainable Development & Planning Jean-Louis Borloo. At this time, preliminary studies of the route were scheduled to take place between May 2011 and July 2012, while actual construction activity was intended to commence during the autumn of 2012. The line was projected to be completed sometime in late 2016.

=== Construction ===
On 27 July 2012, construction of LGV Bretagne-Pays de la Loire was officially commenced following a ceremony attended by RFF President Hubert du Mesnil and Eiffage Managing Director Pierre Berger, as well as other officials. Reportedly, it was expected that the construction phase of the project would generate around 10,000 jobs.

Some elements of LGV Bretagne-Pays de la Loire's construction were contracted out to other companies as well. Italian transport engineering company Ansaldo STS provided the line's signalling infrastructure under a contract valued at €62 million ($80.5 million) issued by Eiffage, while Indian metal fabricator Tata Steel was awarded a €50 million ($65 million) contract for the supply of roughly 50,000 tonnes of rails for the project.

An associated project, which was ultimately not realised, would have required the improvement of the conventional Rennes–Brest and Rennes–Quimper lines via alterations such as the elimination of level crossings and the straightening of sharp curves so that these sections could be facilitate trains moving at the higher speed of 220 km/h (137 mph) If this option had been exercised, the journey time for Paris to Brest and Quimper would have reportedly dropped down to 3 hours. On 2 July 2017, the LGV Bretagne-Pays de la Loire opened in a ceremony overseen by French President Emmanuel Macron.

== Route ==
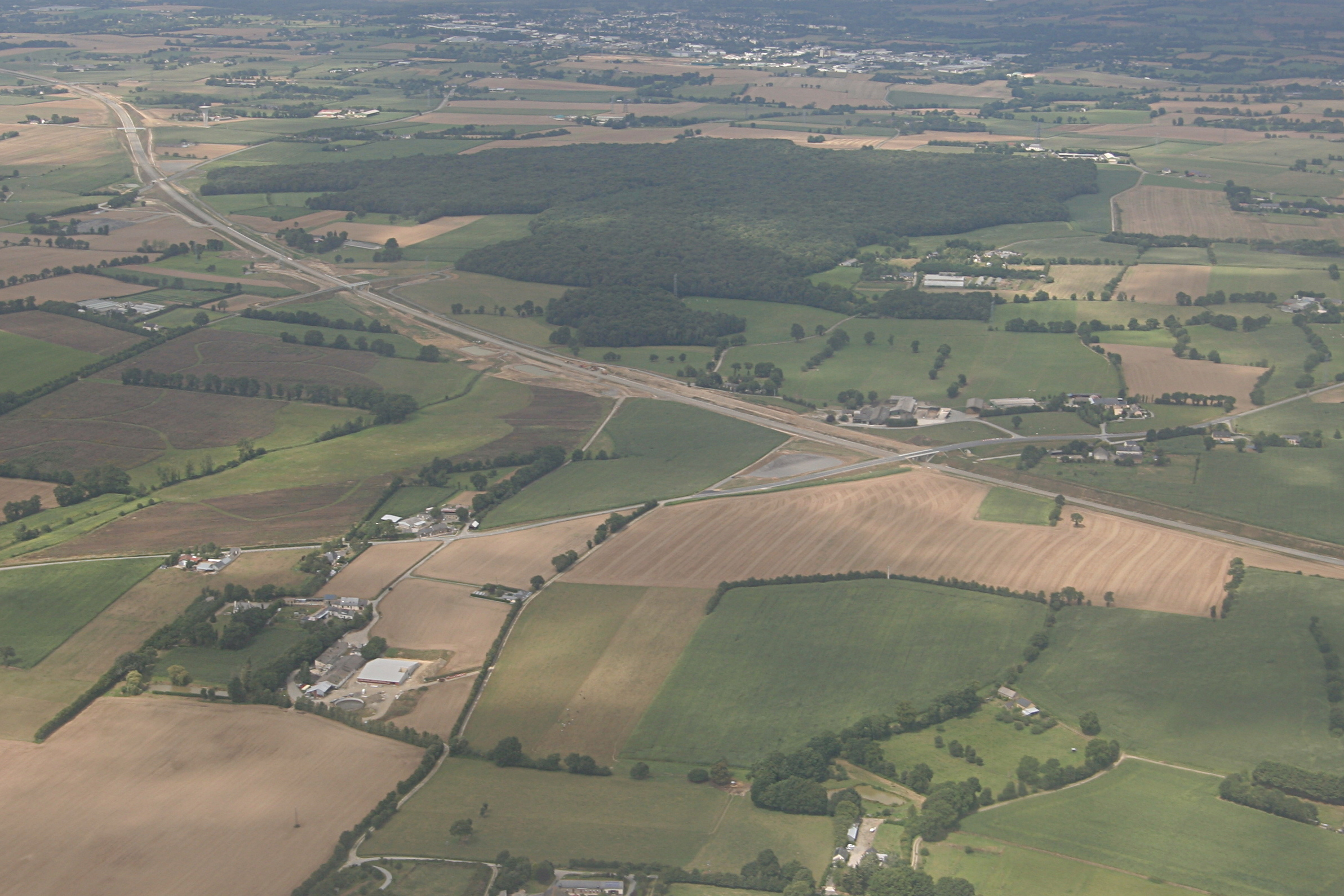
Construction site near Noyal-sur-Vilaine in 2014.

The line begins as an extension of the LGV Atlantique western branch near Connerré (Sarthe). After a connection north of Le Mans, the LGV dips towards the southwest with a connection to the regular Le Mans-Angers line near Sablé-sur-Sarthe. The connection, at a length of 32 km (20 mi), from Sablé-sur-Sarthe slightly speeds up the journey to Nantes. The line then rises to pass north of Laval and re-join the regular line at Cesson-Sévigné, near Rennes. The total length of the route is roughly 214 km (133 mi) of which 182 km (113 mi) being high speed.

The high-speed line featured a total of seven covered trenches and ten viaducts. The track consisted of rails on top of concrete sleepers, which were laid on a bed of ballast; reportedly, a 900,000 tonnes of ballast, 820 km (510 mi) of rails and 680,000 sleepers were used during the line's construction. Overhead lines are provided for electric traction, the majority of trains running the line are intended to be powered in this manner. Electricity is supplied by the French electrical transmission company Réseau de Transport d'Électricité (RTE) and is redistributed along the line via a series of substations, this electrical infrastructure reportedly allows for a maximum speed of 350 km/h (217 mph) to be achieved.

The signalling system of the 182 km (113 mi) new high-speed line conforms with the requirements of European Rail Traffic Management System (ERTMS) Level 2, while the 32 km (20 mi) of conventional connections are equipped with ERTMS Level 1-standard signalling instead. As such, LGV Bretagne-Pays de la Loire does not feature any conventional visual line-side signals, this information being communicated to drivers using in-cab screens instead. A combination of Radio Block Centres (RBC) and Eurobalises are installed at intervals throughout the length of the line to allow for the continuous delivery of this information to trains, which is wirelessly transmitted using the Global System for Mobile Communications – Railway (GSM-R) communication standard. Under normal conditions, all of the line's signalling is centrally controlled via a switching centre located at Rennes.

=== Journey times ===
- Paris–Rennes: 1 hours 26 minutes (a reduction of 37 minutes)
- Paris–Nantes: 1 hours 52 minutes (a reduction of 8 minutes)
- Paris–Saint-Malo: 2 hours 14 minutes (a reduction of 42 minutes)
- Paris–Lorient: 2 hours 56 minutes (a reduction of 42 minutes)
- Paris–Brest: 3 hours 25 minutes (a reduction of 46 minutes)
