= Connerré =

- Commune
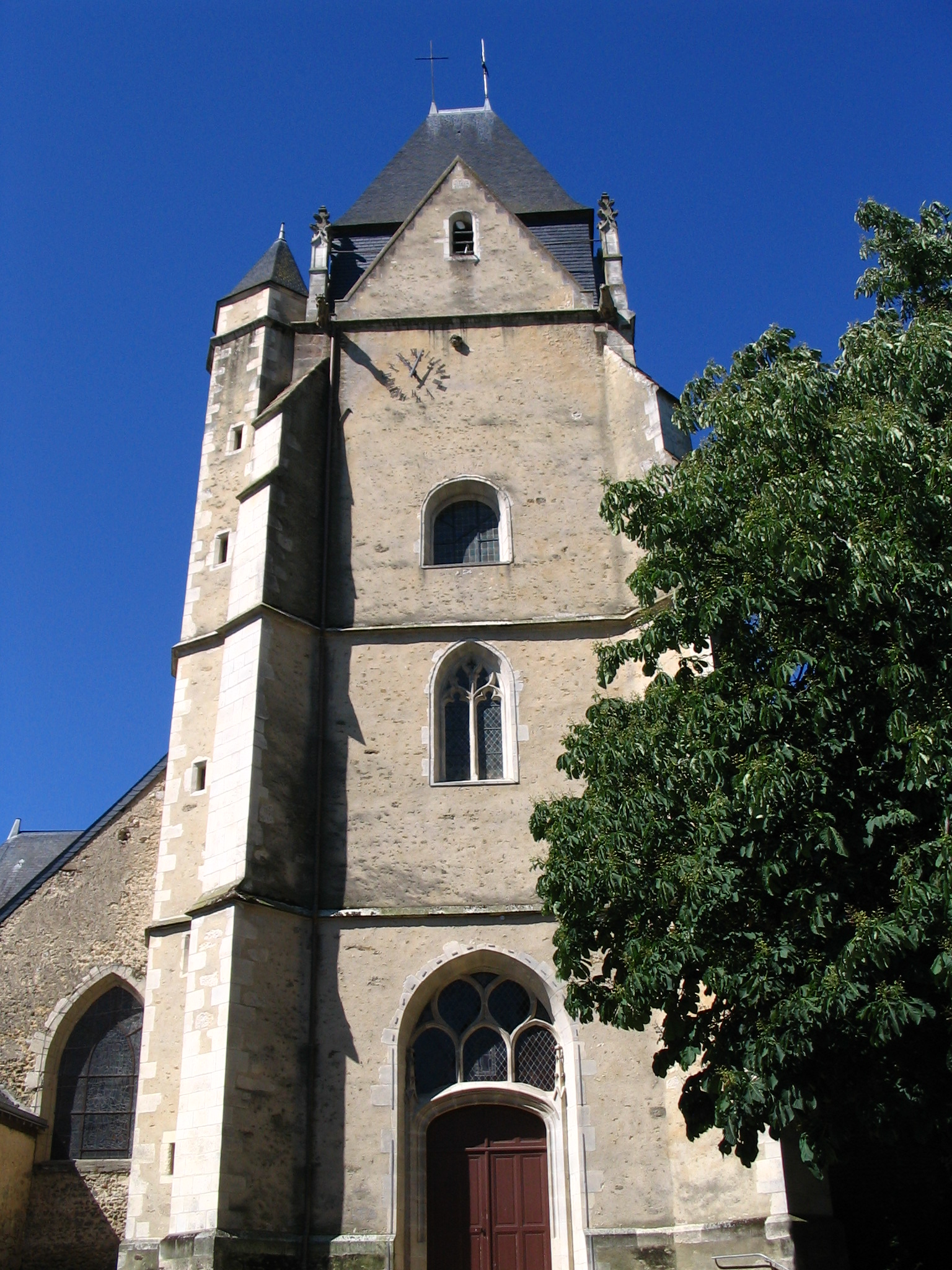
- The church of Saint Symphorien

- Coat of arms
- Location of Connerré
- Location within France Location within Pays de la Loire
- Coordinates: 48°03′42″N 0°29′45″E
- Country: France
- Region: Pays de la Loire
- Department: Sarthe
- Arrondissement: Mamers
- Canton: Savigné-l'Évêque
- Intercommunality: Le Gesnois Bilurien

Government
  - Mayor (2020–2026): Arnaud Mongella
- Area^{1}: 16.6 km^{2} (6.4 sq mi)
- Highest elevation: 145 m (476 ft)
- Lowest elevation: 60 m (200 ft)
- Population (2023): 2,780
  - Density: 167/km^{2} (434/sq mi)
- Demonym(s): Conneréen, Conneréenne
- Time zone: UTC+01:00 (CET)
  - Summer (DST): UTC+02:00 (CEST)
- INSEE/Postal code: 72090 /72160
- ^{1} French Land Register data, which excludes lakes, ponds, glaciers > 1 km^{2} (0.386 sq mi or 247 acres) and river estuaries.

Connerré (French pronunciation: [kɔnɛʁe]) is a commune in the Sarthe department in the Pays de la Loire region of Northwestern France.

== Geography ==
Connerré is best known as where the LGV Atlantique meets the LGV Bretagne-Pays de la Loire.

== Population ==
Historical population
Year	Pop.	±% p.a.
1968	2,383	—
1975	2,523	+0.82%
1982	2,635	+0.62%
1990	2,545	−0.43%
1999	2,590	+0.19%
2007	2,872	+1.30%
2012	2,861	−0.08%
2017	2,902	+0.28%
2023	2,780	−0.71%
Source: INSEE

== See also ==
- Communes of the Sarthe department
