= LGV Sud Europe Atlantique =

French high-speed railway

Coordinates: 46.0896°N 0.1250°E

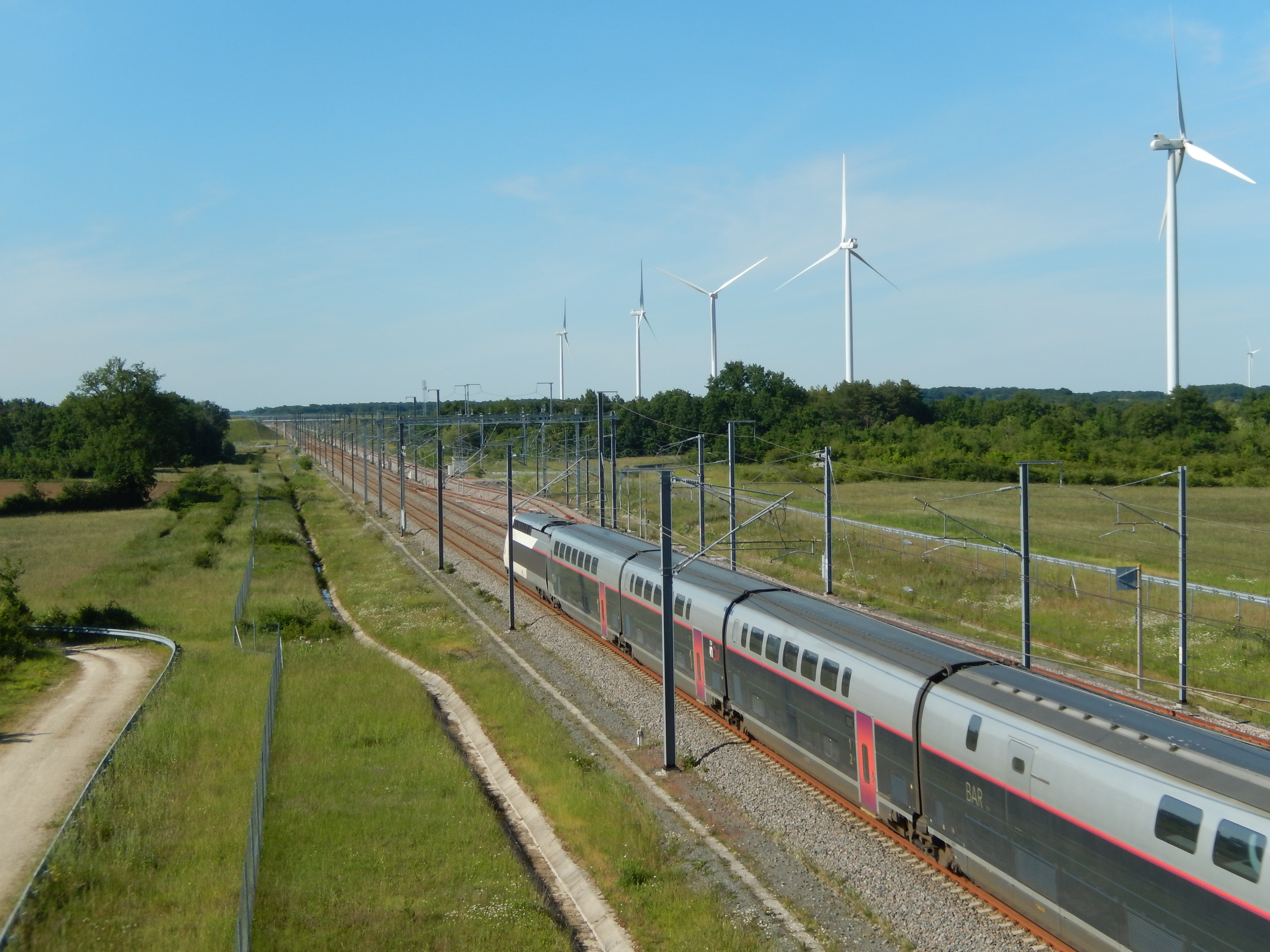
- The LGV Sud Europe Atlantique near Pliboux, Deux-Sèvres

Overview
- Status: Operational
- Owner: SNCF
- Locale: Nouvelle-Aquitaine and Occitanie, France
- Termini: Tours, France; Bordeaux, France

Service
- System: SNCF
- Operator: SNCF

History
- Opened: 2 July 2017

Technical
- Line length: 340 km (210 mi): 302 km (188 mi) (newly built) + 38 km (24 mi) (connection to existing network)
- Num of tracks: Double track
- Track gauge: 1,435 mm (4 ft 8 1/2 in) standard gauge
- Electrification: 25 kV 50 Hz
- Operating speed: 320 km/h (200 mph)
- Signalling: TVM 430 / ETCS Level 2
LGV Sud Europe Atlantique route map
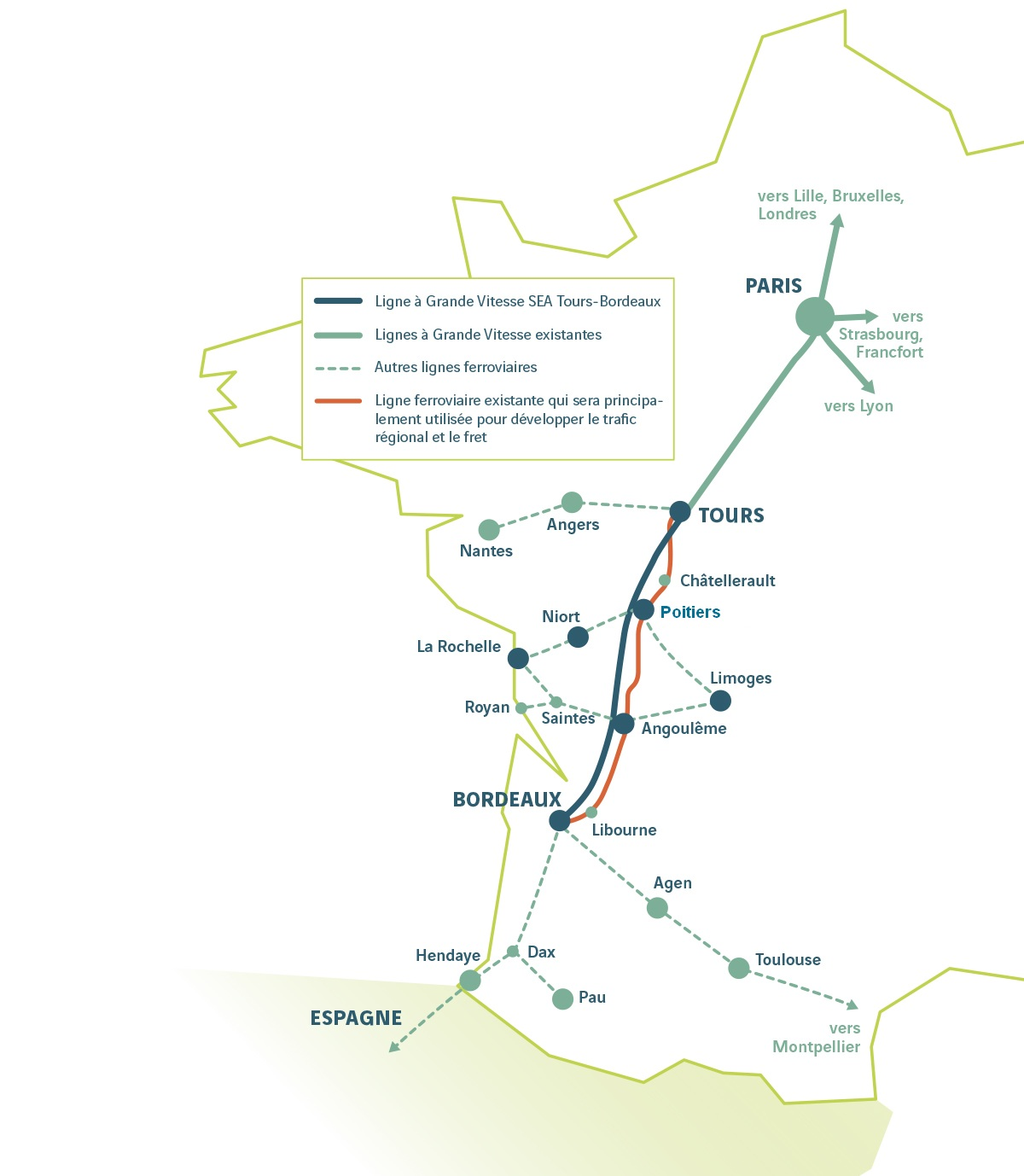

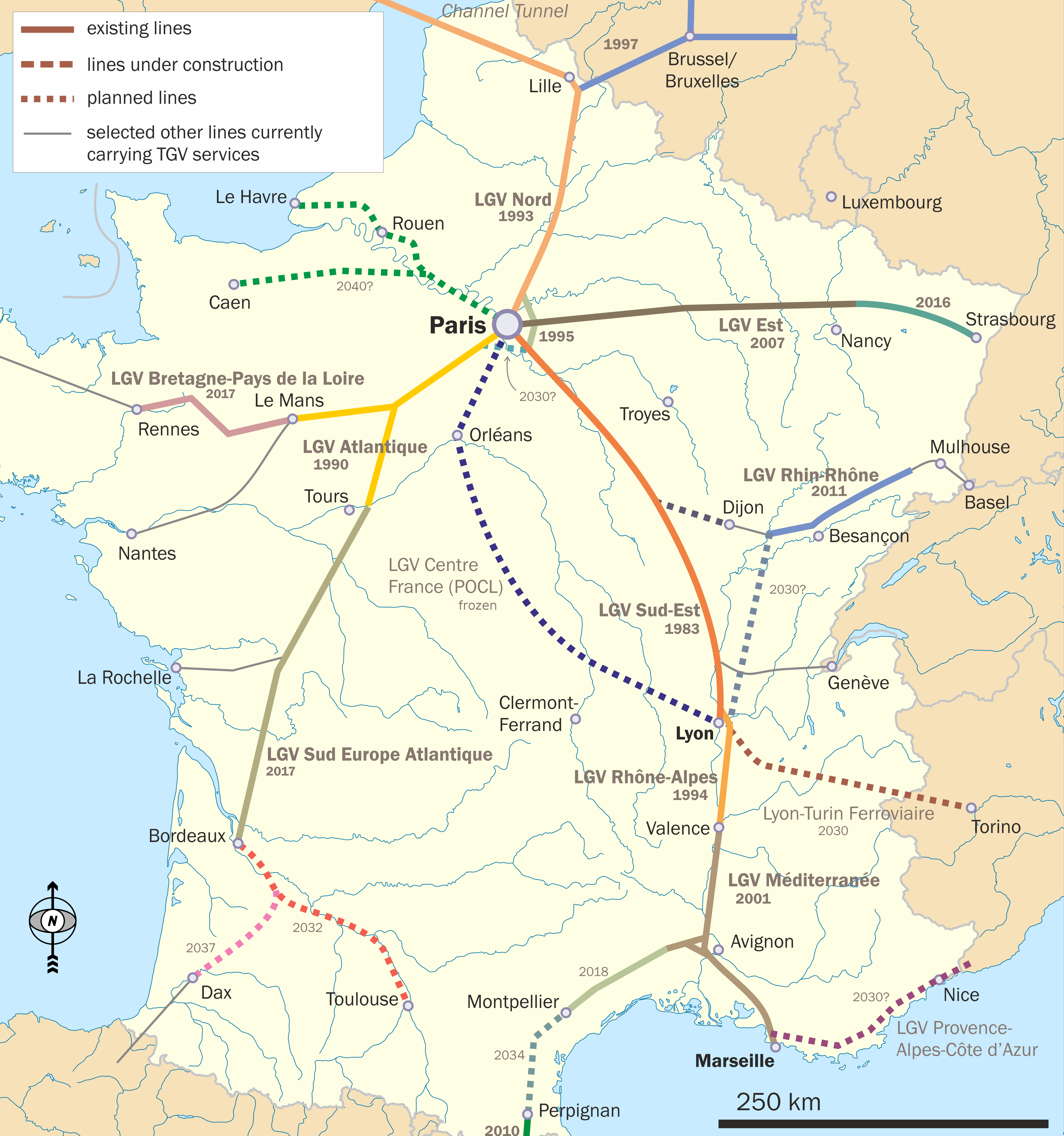
TGV lines in France, with the LGV Sud Europe Atlantique in ochre.

The LGV Sud Europe Atlantique (LGV SEA; 'Atlantic Europe Southern High Speed Railway), also known as the LGV Sud-Ouest or officially named LGV L'Océane by SNCF since April 2016, is a high-speed railway line between the cities of Tours and Bordeaux in France. It is used by TGV inOui and Ouigo trains operated by SNCF. It is an extension of the southern arm of the LGV Atlantique, with the western extension being LGV Bretagne-Pays de la Loire. Both extensions to the high-speed line were inaugurated on 28 February 2017, with services beginning on 2 July 2017. The line, which was at the time the largest European railway construction project, was built by the LISEA consortium, which owns and maintains the line until 2061 and charges tolls to train companies. Trains on this line depart Paris from Gare Montparnasse.

With trains operating at speeds of up to 320 km/h (200 mph), the line allows travelers to connect Paris to Bordeaux in approximately two hours, representing a time saving of nearly one hour compared to the existing low-speed line. Extensions from Bordeaux to Spain (LGV Bordeaux-Espagne) and to Toulouse (LGV Bordeaux-Toulouse) are under consideration, with preliminary work for the latter having begun in May 2024 and the first service expected in 2032.

The financing, construction, operation, and maintenance of this line were conceded to a private company, LISEA, for a period from 2011 to 2061, making it the first high-speed line in France to be built under such a concession model.

== Purpose ==
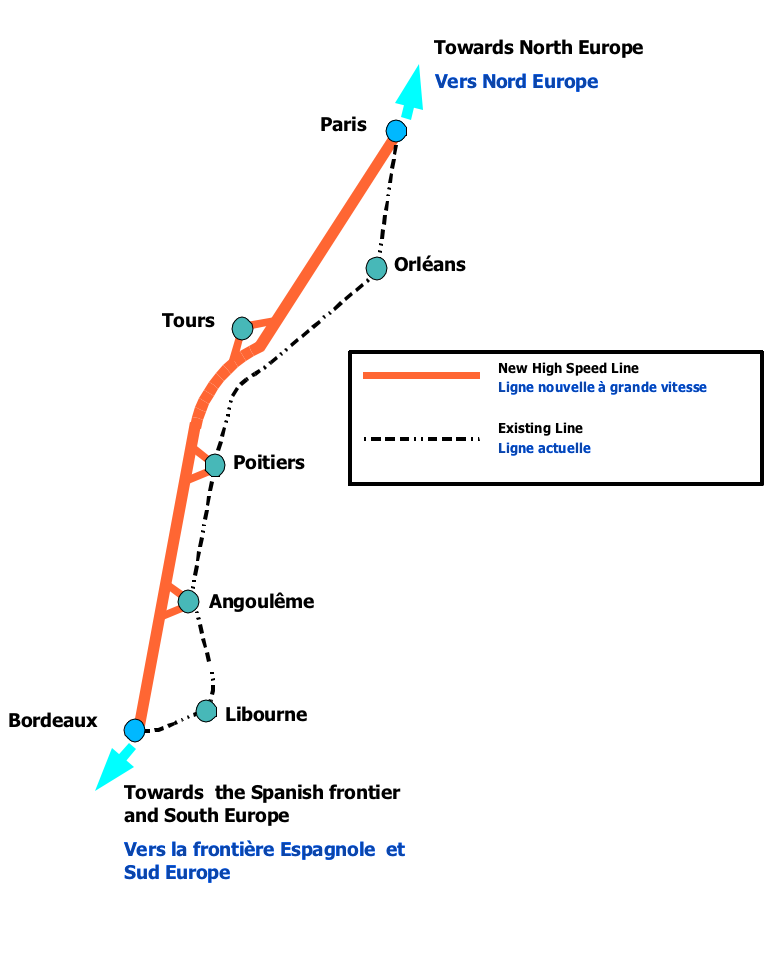
Project map (English/French)

The LGV SEA brings high-speed rail service to southwestern France and connects the regions of Nouvelle-Aquitaine and Occitanie with the high-speed rail service of Northern Europe, which connects Paris to London, Brussels, Amsterdam and beyond. The trip between Paris and Bordeaux takes around two hours and ten minutes at a top speed of 320 km/h (199 mph). The inter-city links between Tours, Poitiers, Angoulême, and Bordeaux are also improved, and southwestern France is better connected to various parts of the country and to the rest of Europe. Trains on this line depart Paris from Gare Montparnasse

The project is also a response to the heavy traffic on the existing rail line. Train tracks are most efficiently used when all trains circulate at the same speed and have identical stops. The large speed difference between the fast TGV trains, which circulated on the existing tracks at speeds up to 220 km/h (137 mph), and the slower freight trains and TER (regional) trains, which shared the same track, caused the interval between these trains to increase greatly. This congested the tracks and prevented their most efficient usage.

Dedicated tracks for the TGV therefore leave space on the existing tracks for many more freight and TER trains than just the number of removed TGV trains. New regional TER services became possible, and could ease services that are currently crowded. The increase in freight trains on the existing track would ease truck traffic on the roads in the régions, as trains transport more and more goods, easing the impact on the environment as well. TER traffic in Nouvelle-Aquitaine increased by 10% in 2018, demonstrating the positive impact of the high-speed line on the regional network.

The use of a concession contract also made it possible, in a constrained financial context, to respond to President Nicolas Sarkozy's desire to launch four high-speed line projects simultaneously (Sud Europe Atlantique, Nîmes-Montpellier bypass, Bretagne-Pays de la Loire, and East European LGV). Private financing helped limit public investment (51% for SEA, compared to an average of 75% for other railway partnership markets).

The project was also sold as benefiting the economy. The construction of Phase 1 created 10,000 construction jobs for five years. Jobs in the transport, commerce, and service sectors were created as well. Local businesses may their see competitiveness increase as their markets expand, and tourism to the region may increase as well.

This route supplements – and partly supersedes – the classic Paris–Bordeaux railway line.

== Details ==
The line was built by consortium LISEA consisting of Vinci Concessions - 33.4%, Caisse des dépôts et consignations - 25.4%, Meridiam - 22.0% and Ardian (formerly Axa Private Equity) - 19.2%. The consortium will operate and maintain the line until 2061, and charges tolls to train companies. The consortium invested €3.8 billion, French government, local authorities and the European Union paid €3 billion and €1 billion was contributed by SNCF Réseau (subsidiary of SNCF). Another €1.2 billion was spent by SNCF Réseau on the construction of interconnecting lines, control centres, capacity enhancements at Bordeaux and remodelling the track layout at Gare Montparnasse.

The total cost of the line was €7.7 billion. Due to the choice of a concession model to finance, build and operate the line, SNCF initially feared that the toll costs for using the line would be higher than for other French high-speed lines. To limit this cost, SNCF considered in 2015 operating trains with greater capacity but reduced frequency. For the same reason, the use of the LGV by Ouigo trains was not initially planned, as the toll cost would be incompatible with the low-cost model of this service. A tug-of-war took place in 2015 between LISEA and SNCF, with the private company requesting 19 services to ensure the profitability of the line against 15 for SNCF. However, SNCF seems to have conceded on all points, as the service offered in July 2017 included 18.5 services and the Ouigo offer uses the entire LGV.

The new high-speed route bypasses Libourne, shortening the total distance traveled compared to the existing route. No new stations were built between Saint-Pierre-des-Corps and Bordeaux, and service to Châtellerault, Poitiers and Angoulême uses their existing train stations, which new connections link to the high-speed rails. South of Poitiers, a connection allows trains to access the old tracks towards La Rochelle.

The journey between Tours and Bordeaux is shortened by around 50 minutes, for a typical Paris-Bordeaux journey time of 2 hours and 3 minutes. 302 km (188 mi) of high-speed track was built together with a further 38 km (24 mi) of conventional tracks that connect to the LGV. The line increased annual ridership by about 3.8% after opening, exceeding the 2.6% to 3.5% predicted at the time of the declaration of public utility.

=== Journey times ===
The planned journey times compared to pre-LGV times:

Journey	2007	2017 (planned)	2017 (actual)
Paris-Bordeaux	3h 00m	2h 04m	2h 04m
Paris-Poitiers	1h 26m	1h 17m	1h 18m
Paris-Angoulême	2h 05m	1h 40m	1h 43m
Paris-La Rochelle	2h 50m	2h 27m	2h 26m
Paris-Toulouse	4h 56m	4h 03m	4h 08m
Bordeaux-Angoulême	0h 52m	0h 35m	0h 35m
Poitiers-Bordeaux	1h 32m	0h 55m	1h 03m
Poitiers-Angoulême	0h 44m	0h 37m	0h 37m
Poitiers-Tours	0h 47m	0h 30m	0h 29m
Tours-Angoulême	1h 32m	1h 07m	0h 57m
Tours-Bordeaux	2h 30m	1h 30m	1h 38m

=== Phases ===
==== Phases 1/2: Tours–Bordeaux ====
In that initial plan, Phase 2 had to be completed on a rapid schedule to cope with the increase in traffic expected after the opening of Phase 1. For this reason, the French government announced additional funding in February 2009 to build Phases 1 and 2 together. Construction began in early 2012, and the line opened in 2017.

==== Phase 3: Bordeaux – Toulouse and Spanish border ====
- Proposed, not currently decided
- 2004–2005: Preliminary studies
- 2006: Public debate

On 30 July 2010, the French government announced that work on the section to the Spanish border was expected to begin before 2020. In 2015 however, a public inquiry rejected the construction of this section due to cost.

The LGV Bordeaux–Toulouse high speed line began preliminary construction in May 2024, with service expected to begin in 2032.

== History ==
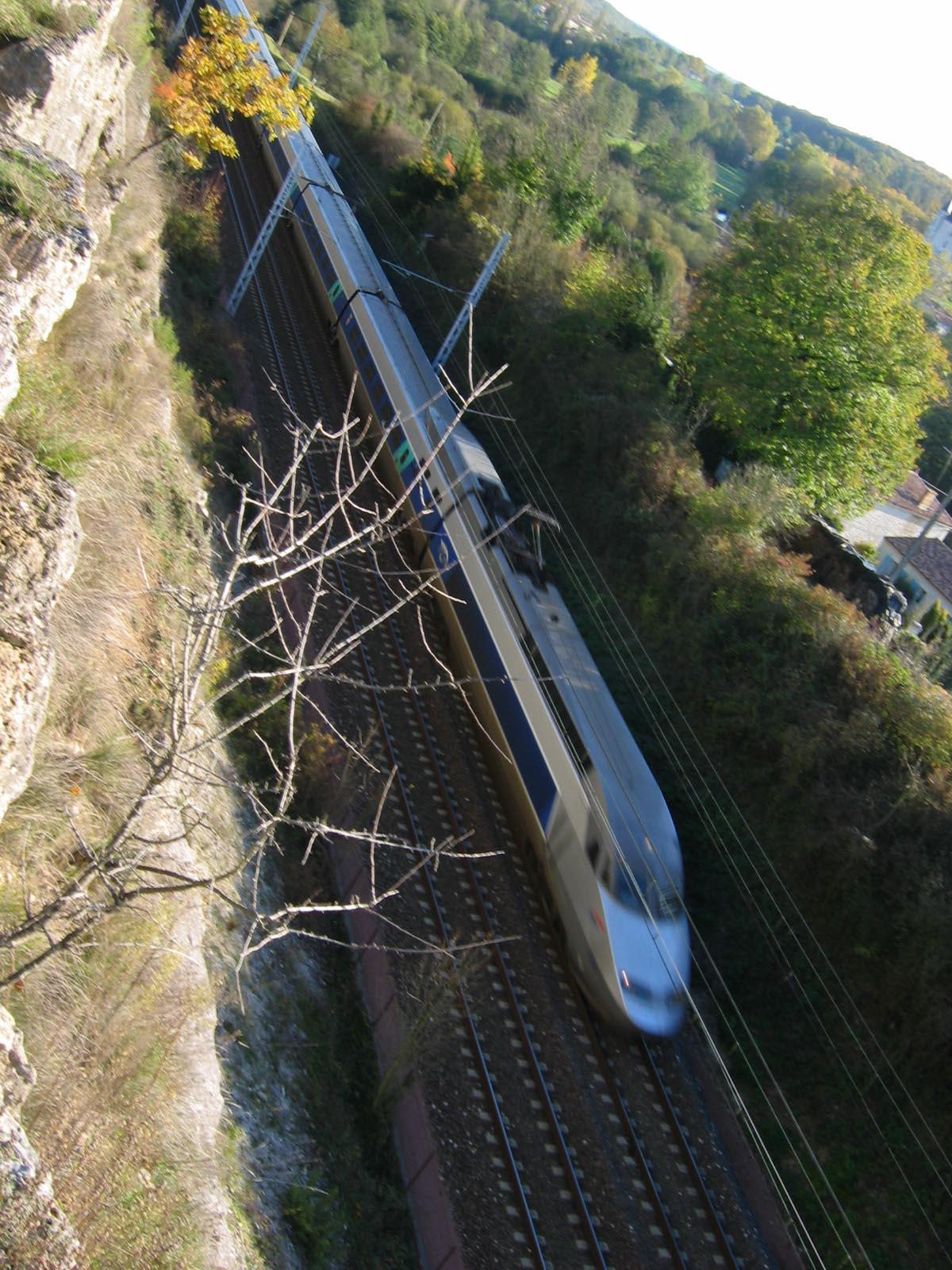
TGV Réseau

- 25 September 1990: Service began on the south-west branch of the LGV Atlantique to Saint-Pierre-des-Corps, west of Tours
- 1 April 1992: Initial proposals for a high-speed link between Saint-Pierre-des-Corps and Bordeaux. Early in its conception, the line was going to be called LGV Aquitaine.
- 1994–1995: Public debate on the LGV Aquitaine project
- 1997–1998: Preliminary studies on the Tours to Bordeaux line
- 2001-2003: Preliminary project studies (APS) for section 1 (Angoulême-Bordeaux)
- 2004-2006: Preliminary project studies for section 2 (Tours-Angoulême)
- 3 February 2005 - 16 March 2005: Public utility inquiry for section 1
- 18 July 2006: Declaration of public utility for works from Villognon to Ambarès-et-Lagrave
- 16 April 2007: Approval of the preliminary design of section 2 by the Ministry of Transport
- 25 October 2007 - 19 December 2007: Public inquiry for section 2
- 10 June 2009: Declaration of public utility for works from Saint-Avertin to Xambes
- 30 March 2010: Vinci consortium selected to build the line
- April 2010: Gironde General Council signs agreement with the State for funding of €138 million
- 16 June 2011: A 50-year concession to build and operate the line is awarded to the LISEA consortium.
- Early 2012: Construction begins, expected to last 73 months (until 1st quarter 2017)
- 6 July 2015: End of civil engineering works, ahead of schedule. Service opening planned for 31 July 2017
- 25 July 2016: First tests of a TGV train at 160 km/h on the central section of the line, following the installation of overhead lines on June 9. Test speeds were increased to 320 km/h from the first week of August
- 28 February 2017: Inauguration of the line by French President François Hollande at the Villognon maintenance base
- 2 July 2017: Line opens commercially

== Ridership ==
Annual ridership statistics
Year	Passengers
2017*	~20,000,000
2018	~20,000,000
2019	~20,000,000
2020	~10,000,000
2021	15,520,000
2022	19,320,000

- Opening year (July 2017), therefore data for approximately 6 months.

== Environmental impact ==
The land area used for the 302 km of LGV was set at 4,200 hectares.
