= Boinville-le-Gaillard =

- Commune
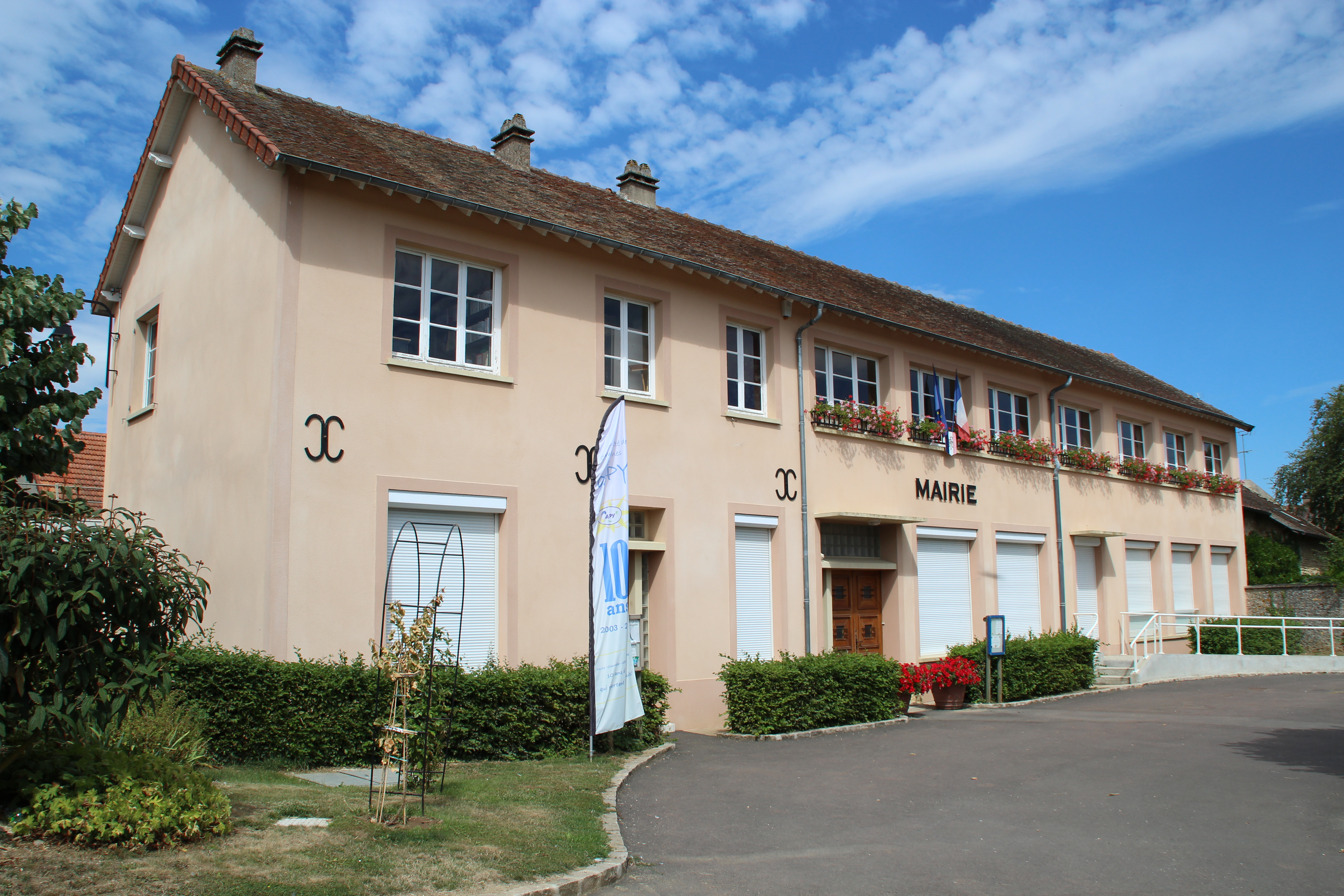
- The town hall in Boinville-le-Gaillard
- Location of Boinville-le-Gaillard
- Location within France Location within Île-de-France (region)
- Coordinates: 48°29′35″N 1°52′19″E
- Country: France
- Region: Île-de-France
- Department: Yvelines
- Arrondissement: Rambouillet
- Canton: Rambouillet
- Intercommunality: CA Rambouillet Territoires

Government
  - Mayor (2020–2026): Jean-Louis Flores
- Area^{1}: 12.52 km^{2} (4.83 sq mi)
- Elevation: 156 m (512 ft)
- Highest elevation: 162 m (531 ft)
- Lowest elevation: 151 m (495 ft)
- Population (2023): 597
  - Density: 47.7/km^{2} (124/sq mi)
- Time zone: UTC+01:00 (CET)
  - Summer (DST): UTC+02:00 (CEST)
- INSEE/Postal code: 78071 /78660
- ^{1} French Land Register data, which excludes lakes, ponds, glaciers > 1 km^{2} (0.386 sq mi or 247 acres) and river estuaries.

Boinville-le-Gaillard (French pronunciation: [bwɛ̃vil lə ɡajaʁ]) is a commune in the Yvelines department in north-central France.

== See also ==
- Communes of the Yvelines department
