= Basque Y =

High-speed rail network under construction

Basque Y route map.

Basque Y or the Basque Triangle is the high-speed rail network being built between the three cities of the Basque Autonomous Community, in Spain: Bilbao, Vitoria-Gasteiz and San Sebastián.

== Route ==
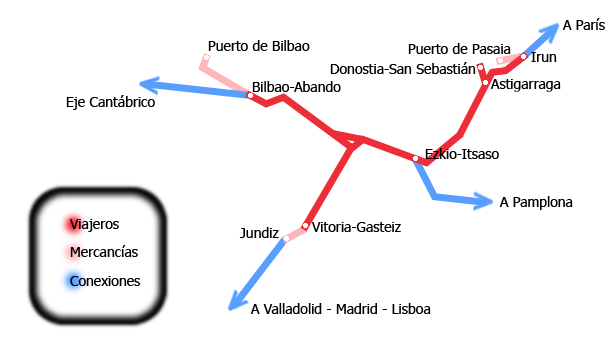
The connections to other networks.

Basque Y construction progress (2023) Completed Under construction Awarded To be awarded

Location of the Basque Y in Spain

It will transport cargo and passengers. The cargo trains will connect the Port of Bilbao with the Port of Pasaia, (also known as Pasajes/Pasajes-San Pedro). The new high-speed network will consist of 172 km long track. Due to the mountainous relief of the region, 104,3 km (61%) will be in 80 tunnels and 17 km (10%) in 71 bridges, leaving only 50.6 km, 29% of the route on the ground, in trenches or embankments.

The maximum speed is 120 km/h for freight trains, whilst passenger trains will travel at speeds of 220 km/h to 240 km/h.

The Basque Y will be built in standard rail gauge (1,435 mm (4 ft 8 1/2 in) ). It will connect Madrid via Valladolid and connect France via Irun. While the French high-speed rail line (on which the TGV trains achieve their top speeds) is not planned to reach Hendaye until 2032, the Hendaye-Bordeaux track allows 160 km/h. The network will also include a connection to the Navarrese Corridor, the high speed line projected between Zaragoza and the capital of Navarre, Pamplona.

=== Travel time comparisons ===
As announced initially, it could take well under one hour to connect the cities while the current slower network takes from 1 h 40 min to 2.5 hours. However, a closer study revealed in February 2015 that the projections below do not possibly hold water, conspicuously delaying initial time estimates.

Origin	Destination	Straight line distance	Current minimum travel time by train	By bus	By car	Projected time on the Basque Y
Bilbao	San Sebastián	78 km	2 h 13 min	1 h 10 min	1 h	38 min
Bilbao	Vitoria-Gasteiz	50 km	2 h 20 min	1 h	45 min	28 min
Vitoria-Gasteiz	San Sebastián	76 km	1 h 40 min	1 h 30 min	1 h 10 min	34 min
Bilbao	Madrid	321 km	4 h 50 min	4 h 45 min	4 h	2 h 15 min

=== Stations ===
- Bilbao-Abando. Initially the trains will reach Basauri and passengers will commute to the Cercanías Bilbao C-3 suburban railway.
- Vitoria-Gasteiz
- Irún
- San Sebastián-Norte
- Ezkio-Itsaso. It is uncertain if it will be finally fully built.
- Euba

== Planning ==
It took 19 years from the first proposals of a Basque high-speed network to the detailed project. The main issues were disagreements between the series of Spanish and Basque governments, and who would bear the costs. Through the Basque tax agreement, the Spanish government will make initial payments on behalf of the Basque government.

An agreement on 24 April 2006 put the section between Vitoria-Gasteiz and Bilbao under Spanish control (through Adif), and the section in Gipuzkoa province under Basque control. It will be the costliest investment in the Basque Country. The completion of the works was originally forecast for 2017, but it's been delayed several times since then.

In June 2012, the European Investment Bank agreed to offer €1bn of funding.

In early 2015, relevant public authorities (Basque Government, Spanish Ministry of Public Works) renewed their commitment with the project, while on the French branch (Aquitaine) financial tensions and public interest considerations risk to halt progress in high-speed rail works. In May 2017 a new collaboration agreement was signed between the Basque Government and the Spanish Ministry making changes in the previous agreement from 2006. In October 2017 the deadline was set in year 2023 by Basque high-ranking officials. However, in end 2022 Adif's draft budget put the completion of the Basque Y to the year 2027. A connection with Pamplona via two different alternative routes, one via Vitoria-Gasteiz and one via Ezkio/Itsaso is currently in debate.

As of February 2024 services are planned to begin in 2027.

== Benefits ==
It will ease mobility between the Basque capitals, in fact, travel times between Bilbao, San Sebastián and Vitoria-Gasteiz will be cut in half. In addition, the Basque government is improving the existing EuskoTren infrastructure between Bilbao and San Sebastián, enabling a better connection between smaller towns and big cities.

The cargo traffic will ease congestion due to road traffic, reduce probability of accidents and help in territorial integration. The railway will connect the Port of Bilbao with Europe's major railway lines.The Basque Y is being built in European rail gauge (1,435 mm (4 ft 8 1/2 in)).

To reduce the environmental impact, the layout avoids the natural areas of Aizkorri, Urkiola and Aralar. The increase on the usage of railway, will reduce the usage of planes, more polluting than trains. In addition it will be more affordable than traveling by plane, and taking passengers to the very centre of cities, instead of the outskirts, where airports are usually located.

== Criticism ==
The official Y-shaped layout was approved by the Basque Parliament, but criticised by Ezker Batua-Berdeak, a coalition of the Basque branch of United Left, a component member of the Basque Government in 2007. EB put forward a U-shaped layout.

More significant is the opposition staged by the Basque nationalist left and several ecologist groups, such as AHT Gelditu. A demonstration against the train gathered thousands to Arrasate/Mondragón in December 2007. Before the 2010-2011 permanent ceasefire, the Basque armed separatist group ETA had the works as one of its targets. In December 2008, Ignacio Uría Mendizábal, the chief executive of a construction company working on the project, was shot dead by ETA and in February 2009 a bomb planted against Ferrovial went off in Madrid.

PNV's Basque Government has voiced its concern and mistrust over the Madrid government's actual commitment in the face of overdue funding by December 2014. EH Bildu, the leading political force in Gipuzkoa, confirmed in early 2015 its frontal refusal to the project, pointing to the Basque Y's alleged shaky foundations (financially no return or loss, feeble public service). Basque nationalist left's spokespersons labelled the project a "deception-based propaganda operation".

== See also ==
- Atlantic Core Network Corridor
- High-speed rail in Spain
