= Villiers-sur-Loir =

- Commune
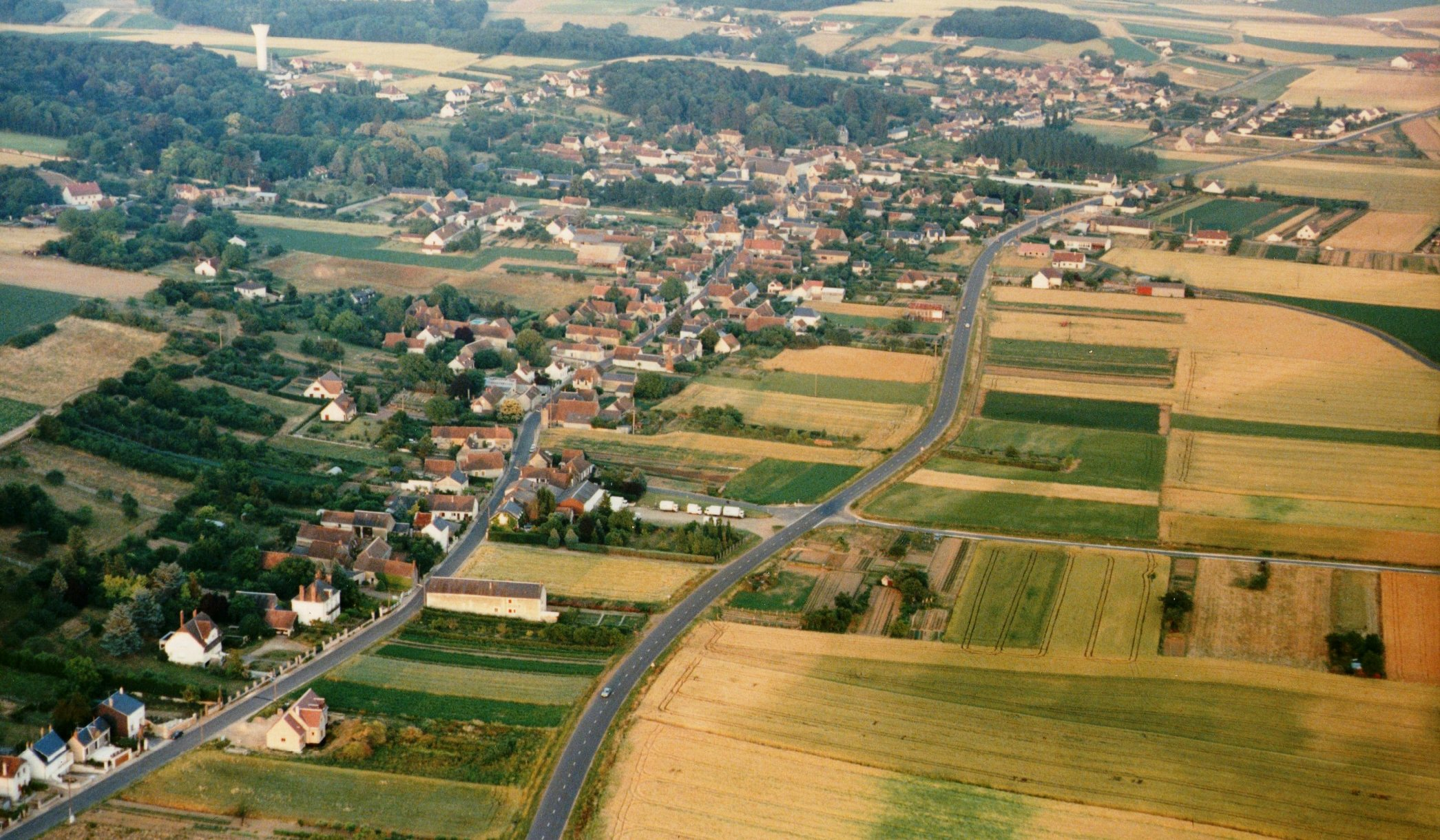
- An aerial view of Villiers-sur-Loir

- Coat of arms
- Location of Villiers-sur-Loir
- Location within France Location within Centre-Val de Loire
- Coordinates: 47°48′27″N 0°59′41″E
- Country: France
- Region: Centre-Val de Loire
- Department: Loir-et-Cher
- Arrondissement: Vendôme
- Canton: Vendôme
- Intercommunality: CA Territoires Vendômois

Government
  - Mayor (2020–2026): Albert Pigoreau
- Area^{1}: 10 km^{2} (3.9 sq mi)
- Elevation: 90 m (300 ft)
- Highest elevation: 141 m (463 ft)
- Lowest elevation: 70 m (230 ft)
- Population (2023): 1,105
  - Density: 110/km^{2} (290/sq mi)
- Time zone: UTC+01:00 (CET)
  - Summer (DST): UTC+02:00 (CEST)
- INSEE/Postal code: 41294 /41100
- ^{1} French Land Register data, which excludes lakes, ponds, glaciers > 1 km^{2} (0.386 sq mi or 247 acres) and river estuaries.

Villiers-sur-Loir (French pronunciation: [vilje syʁ lwaʁ]; lit. 'Villiers-on-Loir') is a commune in the Loir-et-Cher department in central France.

== Population ==
Historical population
Year	Pop.	±% p.a.
1968	766	—
1975	824	+1.05%
1982	997	+2.76%
1990	976	−0.27%
1999	1,190	+2.23%
2007	1,226	+0.37%
2012	1,165	−1.02%
2017	1,131	−0.59%
2023	1,105	−0.39%
Source: INSEE

== See also ==
- Communes of the Loir-et-Cher department
