= List of SNCF stations in Normandy =

This article contains a list of current SNCF railway stations in the Normandy region of France.

== Calvados (14) ==
- Audrieu
- Bayeux
- Blonville-sur-Mer-Benerville
- Bretteville-Norrey
- Caen
- Dives-Cabourg
- Dives-sur-Mer-Port Guillaume
- Frénouville-Cagny
- Le Grand-Jardin
- Houlgate
- Lisieux
- Lison
- Mézidon
- Le Molay-Littry
- Moult-Argences
- Pont-l'Évêque
- Saint-Pierre-sur-Dives
- Trouville-Deauville
- Villers-sur-Mer
- Vire

== Eure (27) ==
- Beaumont-le-Roger
- Bernay
- La Bonneville-sur-Iton
- Bourgtheroulde-Thuit-Hébert
- Brionne
- Bueil
- Conches
- Évreux-Normandie
- Gaillon-Aubevoye
- Gisors
- Nonancourt
- Pont-de-l'Arche
- Romilly-la-Puthenaye
- Serquigny
- Val-de-Reuil
- Verneuil-sur-Avre
- Vernon–Giverny

== Manche (50) ==
- Avranches
- Carentan
- Cherbourg
- Coutances
- Folligny
- Granville
- Pont-Hébert
- Pontorson-Mont-Saint-Michel
- Saint-Lô
- Valognes
- Villedieu-les-Poêles

== Orne (61) ==
- L'Aigle
- Alençon
- Argentan
- Bretoncelles
- Briouze
- Condé-sur-Huisne
- Écouché
- Flers
- Sainte-Gauburge
- Sées
- Surdon
- Le Theil-La-Rouge

== Seine-Maritime (76) ==
- Auffay
- Aumale
- Barentin
- Blangy-sur-Bresle
- Bréauté-Beuzeville
- Clères
- Dieppe
- Elbeuf-Saint-Aubin
- Étainhus-Saint-Romain
- Eu
- Fécamp
- Foucart-Alvimare
- Gournay-Ferrières
- Harfleur
- Le Havre
- Longroy-Gamaches
- Longuerue-Vieux-Manoir
- Longueville-sur-Scie
- Malaunay-Le Houlme
- Maromme
- Montérolier-Buchy
- Montville
- Morgny
- Motteville
- Oissel
- Pavilly
- Rouen-Rive-Droite
- Saint-Aubin-sur-Scie
- Saint-Étienne-du-Rouvray
- Saint-Laurent-Gainneville
- Saint-Victor
- Serqueux
- Sommery
- Sotteville-lès-Rouen
- Tourville
- Le Tréport-Mers
- Yvetot

== See also ==
- SNCF
- List of SNCF stations for SNCF stations in other regions
