= TER Basse-Normandie =

French regional rail network

Overview
- Number of stations: 46
- Daily ridership: 11,200
- Website: http://www.sncf.com/en/trains/ter

Operation
- Began operation: 1986
- Ended operation: 2017

Technical
- Track gauge: 1,435 mm (4 ft 8 1/2 in) standard gauge
TER Basse-Normandie map
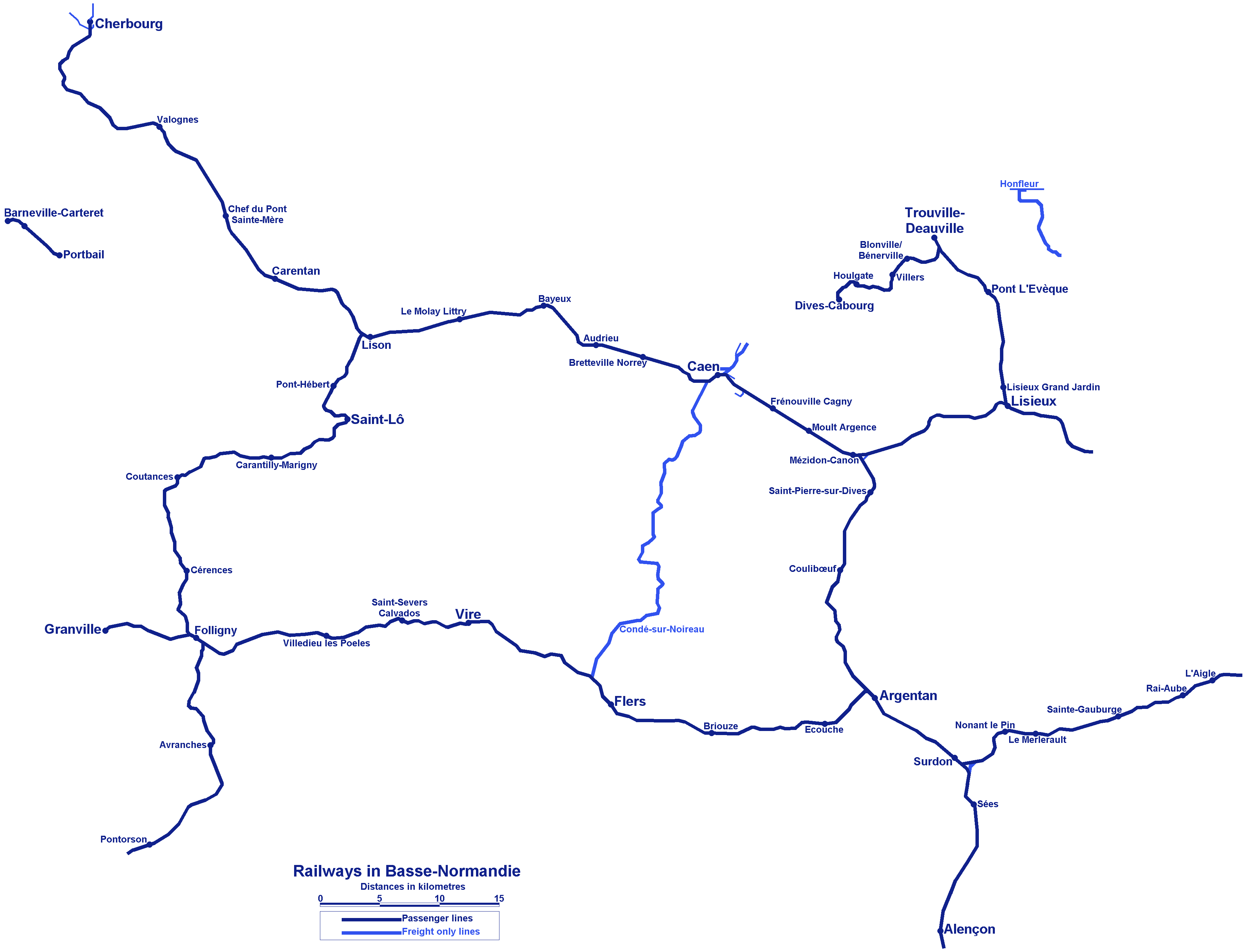

TER Basse-Normandie was the regional rail network serving Lower Normandy, France. In 2017, it was merged into the new TER Normandie. Its network was articulated around the city of Caen.

Trains are operated by the SNCF, services are subject to regulation by the Conseil Régional de Basse Normandie and are promoted using the TER branding. The Conseil Régional has since 2001 received several new multiple diesel-electric units, including single coach, double coach and refurbishment of three car DMUs.

== TER Network ==
=== Main destinations ===
- Caen
- Lisieux
- Bayeux
- Deauville
- Argentan

=== Rail ===
Line	Route	Frequency	Notes
1	Lisieux – Mézidon ... Caen ... Bayeux ... Lison – Carentan – Valognes – Cherbourg		
2	Paris-Montparnasse – Dreux – Nonancourt – Verneuil-sur-Avre – L'Aigle – Rai-Aube† – Sainte-Gauburge – Le Merlerault† – Nonant-le-Pin† – Surdon – Argentan – Écouché† – Briouze – Flers – Vire – Saint-Sever† – Villedieu-les-Poêles – Folligny† – Granville		
5	Lisieux – Le Grand-Jardin – Pont-l'Évêque – Trouville-Deauville – Blonville-sur-Mer-Benerville – Villers-sur-Mer – Houlgate – Dives-sur-Mer-Port-Guillaume – Dives-Cabourg		
7 (3)	Caen – Mézidon – Saint-Pierre-sur-Dives† – Coulibœuf† – Argentan – Surdon† – Sées – Alençon – La Hutte-Coulombiers† – Vivoin-Beaumont† – Teillé† – Montbizot† – La Guierche† – Neuville-sur-Sarthe† – Le Mans		
8	Caen – Mézidon – Lisieux – Bernay – Serquigny† – Brionne† – Glos-Montfort† – Bourgtheroulde-Thuit-Hébert† – Elbeuf-Saint-Aubin – Rouen-Rive-Droite		
9 (4)	Caen ... Bayeux ... Lison ... Saint-Lô ... Coutances – Folligny – Avranches ... Dol-de-Bretagne – Rennes		
11	Granville – Folligny – Avranches – Pontorson-Mont Saint-Michel – Dol-de-Bretagne – La Gouesnière-Cancale – Saint-Malo		summer only
† Not all trains call at this station

=== Road ===
- Coutances – Granville
- Bagnoles-de-l'Orne – Briouze – Argentan

== Rolling stock ==
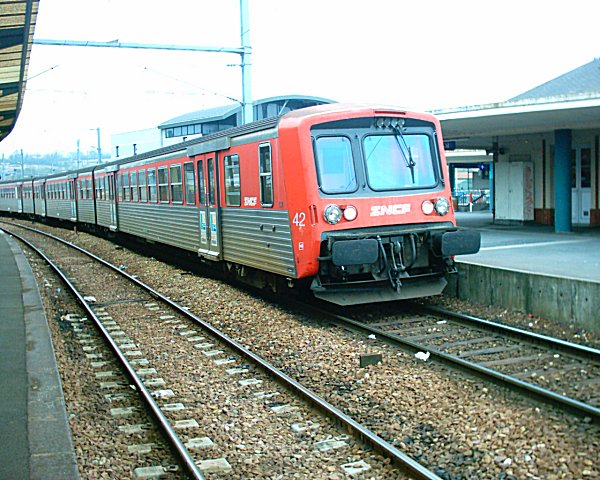
A TER Haute Normandie RRR train in Lisieux.

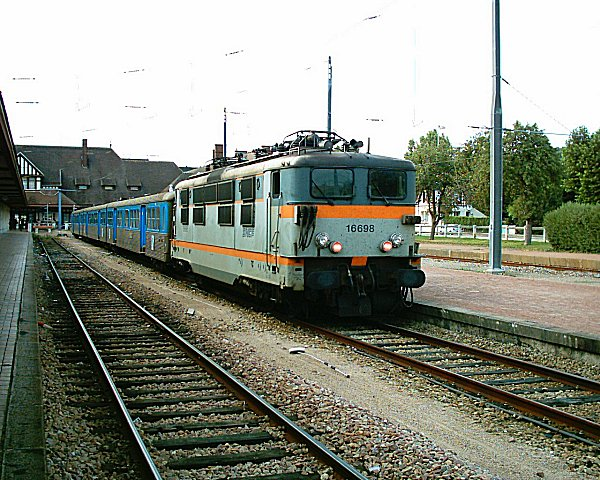
A TER Basse-Normandie train at Deauville.

TER Basse Normandie is operated by an array of rolling stock, including multiple units and both diesel and electric hauled trains:

- BB 16500 + RIO
- BB 67400 + RIO/Corail
- X 4630
- X 4900
- X 72500
- X 73500
- AGC

== Network ==
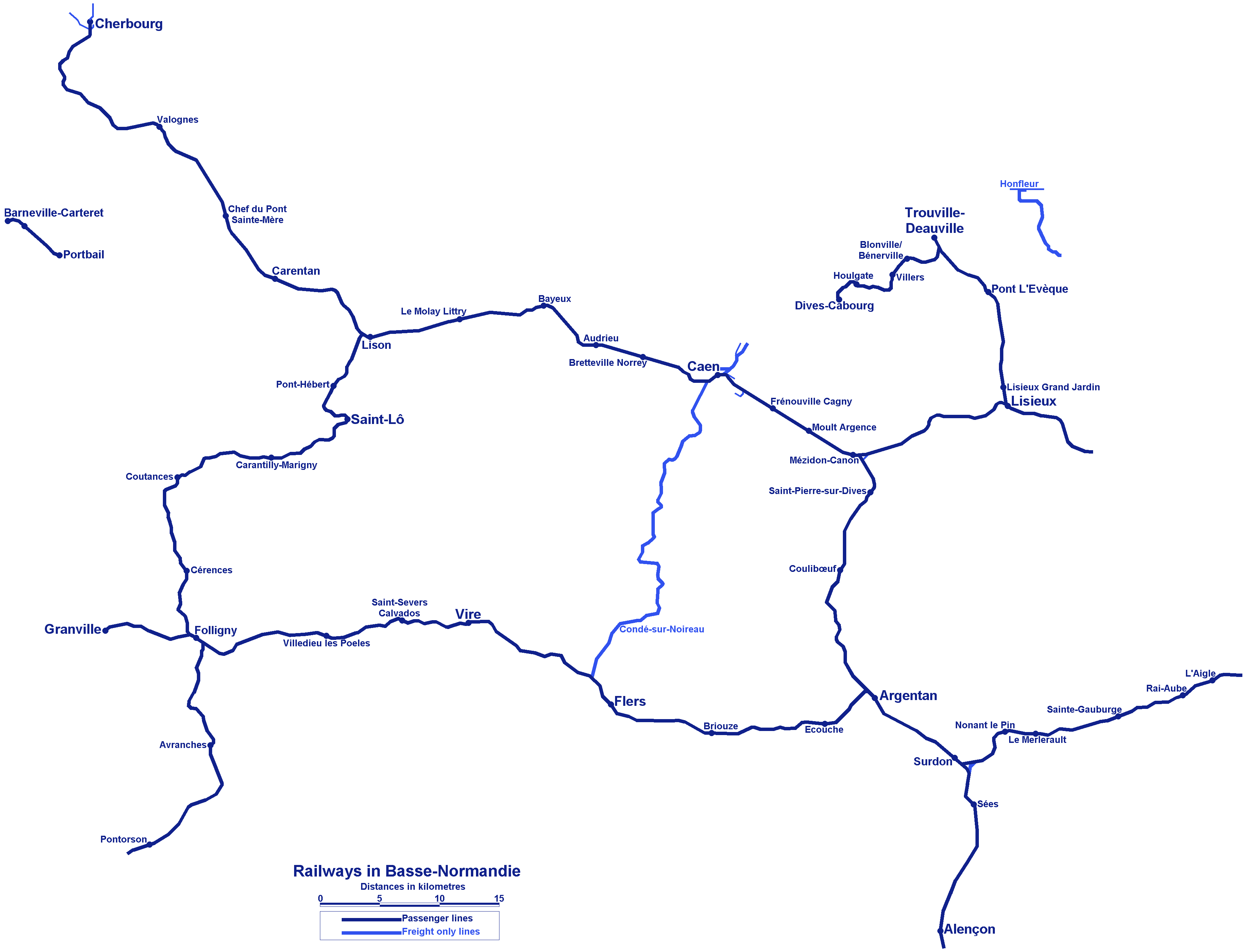
Plan of railways in Lower Normandy.

== General references ==
- Emangard, Pierre-Henri; Collardey, Bernard; Zembri, Pierre (2002). Des omnibus aux TER. Paris: Vie du rail & des transports. ISBN 2-902808-83-6.
