= Nomad Train =

Regional rail services in Normandy, France

TER Normandie (Nomad Train)
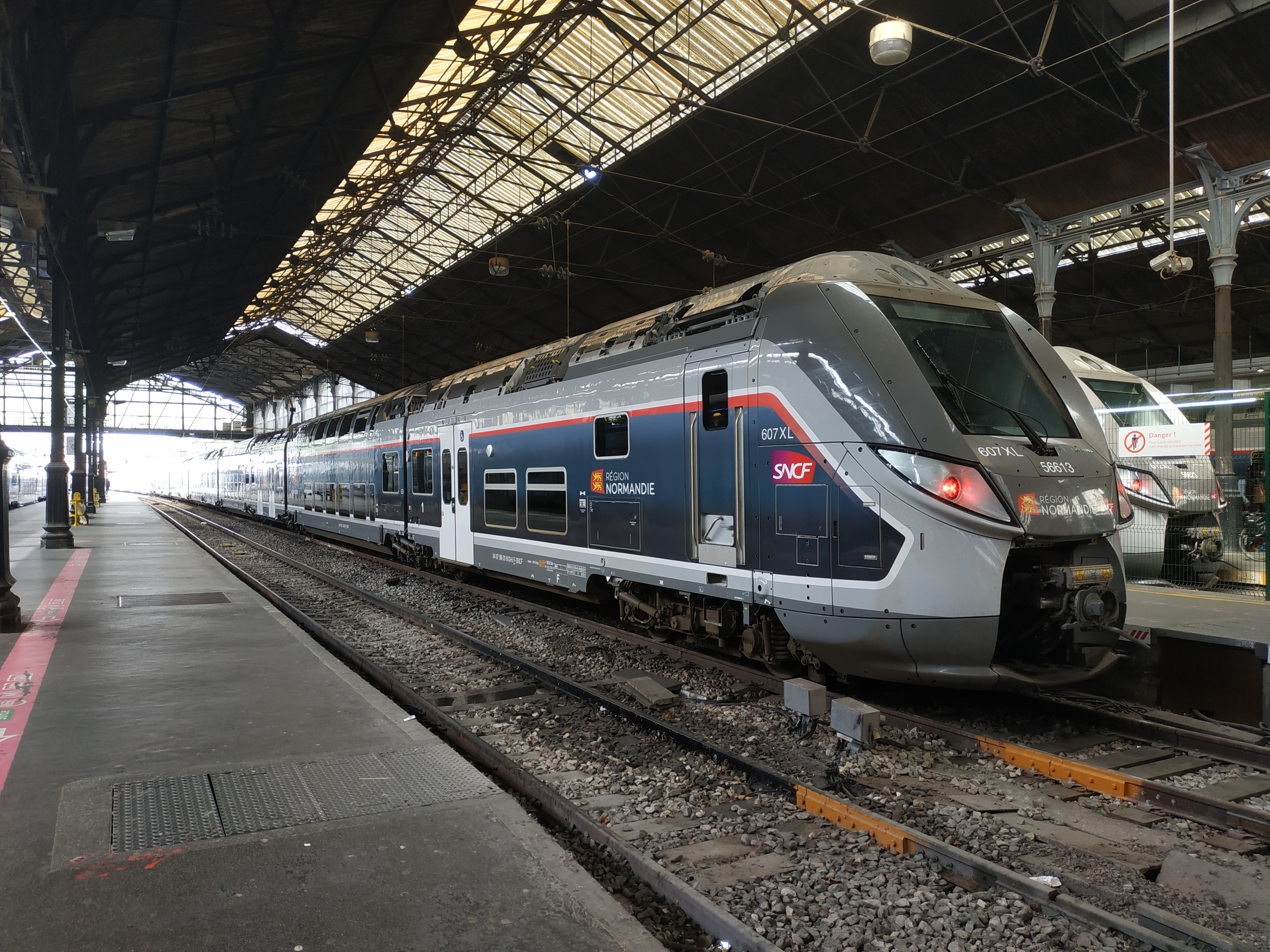
- A Z56600 (Omneo Premium) trainset at Paris-Saint-Lazare station.
- Other regions: Centre Val de Loire; Hauts de France; Pays de la loire
- Fleet: 9 B 82500 AGC; 15 B 84500 Coradia polyvalent; 10 B 85900 Coradia polyvalent; 25 X 73500 A TER; 14 X 76500; 16 Z 26500 TER 2NNG; 33 Z 27500 TER 2NNG; 24 Z 56600 Porteur hyperdense (PHD)
- Parent company: SNCF
Route map

Nomad Train, before 2020 known as TER Normandie is the network of the regional train services organised by the region of Normandy (northwestern France) and operated by the French national railway company SNCF. The brand name refers to the more general brand Nomad that also contains coach transport in the same region by other operators. The network was formed in 2016 from the previous TER networks TER Basse-Normandie and TER Haute-Normandie, after the respective regions were merged.

== Network ==
Five types of services are distinguished by TER Normandie:

- Krono+: fast long distance connections
- Krono: long and medium distance connections
- Citi: frequent suburban services
- Proxi: local services
- Seasonal services in summer

The rail and bus network as of May 2022:

=== Rail ===
Krono+	Route
Paris – Le Havre	Paris-Saint-Lazare – Rouen-Rive-Droite – Yvetot – Bréauté-Beuzeville – Le Havre
Paris – Caen - Cherbourg	Paris-Saint-Lazare – Évreux-Normandie† – Bernay† – Lisieux† – Caen – Bayeux – Lison – Carentan – Valognes – Cherbourg
Paris – Trouville-Deauville	Paris-Saint-Lazare – Évreux-Normandie – Bernay – Lisieux – Pont-l'Évêque – Trouville-Deauville
Krono	Route
Paris – Granville	Paris-Montparnasse – Versailles-Chantiers† – Dreux† – Nonancourt† – Verneuil-sur-Avre – L'Aigle – Sainte-Gauburge† – Surdon† – Argentan – Briouze† – Flers – Vire – Villedieu-les-Poêles – Folligny† – Granville
Caen – Rouen	Caen – Mézidon – Lisieux – Bernay – Elbeuf-Saint-Aubin – Rouen-Rive-Droite
Rouen – Dieppe	Rouen-Rive-Droite – Montville – Clères – Auffay – Dieppe
Rouen – Amiens - Lille	Rouen-Rive-Droite ... Serqueux ... Abancourt ... Amiens ... Lille-Flandres (see TER Hauts-de-France line K44/45 for details)
Caen – Le Mans	Caen – Mézidon – Saint-Pierre-sur-Dives – Argentan – Surdon – Sées – Alençon – La Hutte-Coulombiers† – Vivoin-Beaumont† – Teillé† – Montbizot† – La Guierche† – Neuville-sur-Sarthe† – Le Mans
Citi	Route
Le Havre – Rolleville	Le Havre ... Montivilliers ... Rolleville
Rouen – Paris	Rouen – Oissel ... Vernon ... Mantes-la-Jolie – Paris-Saint-Lazare
Serquigny – Paris	Serquigny ... Évreux-Normandie ... Mantes-la-Jolie – Paris-Saint-Lazare
Yvetot – Rouen – Elbeuf	Yvetot ... Rouen-Rive-Droite ... Oissel ... Elbeuf-Saint-Aubin
Caen – Granville	Caen ... Bayeux ... Lison ... Saint-Lô ... Coutances – Granville
Caen – Lisieux	Caen ... Mézidon – Lisieux
Granville – Rennes	Granville – Folligny – Avranches ... Dol-de-Bretagne – Rennes
Proxi	Route
Lisieux – Trouville-Deauville	Lisieux – Le Grand-Jardin – Pont-l'Évêque – Trouville-Deauville
Caen – Rouen	Caen – Mézidon – Lisieux – Bernay – Serquigny ... Elbeuf-Saint-Aubin – Rouen-Rive-Droite
Rouen – Dieppe	Rouen-Rive-Droite ... Montville – Clères ... Auffay ... Dieppe
Rouen – Le Havre	Rouen-Rive-Droite ... Yvetot ... Bréauté-Beuzeville ... Le Havre
Le Havre – Fécamp	Le Havre – Harfleur ... Bréauté-Beuzeville – Fécamp
Gisors – Serqueux	Gisors – Sérifontaine – Gournay-Ferrières – Serqueux
Le Tréport-Mers – Beauvais	Le Tréport-Mers ... Abancourt ... Beauvais (see TER Hauts-de-France line P30 for details)
Seasonal	Route
Trouville-Deauville – Dives-Cabourg	Trouville-Deauville – Blonville-sur-Mer-Benerville – Villers-sur-Mer – Houlgate – Dives-sur-Mer-Port-Guillaume – Dives-Cabourg
Paris – Pontorson–Mont-Saint-Michel	Paris-Montparnasse – Versailles-Chantiers – Dreux – Nonancourt – Verneuil-sur-Avre – L'Aigle – Sainte-Gauburge – Surdon – Argentan – Briouze – Flers – Vire – Villedieu-les-Poêles – Folligny – Avranches – Pontorson–Mont-Saint-Michel
† Not all trains call at this station

=== Bus ===
Krono (fast) bus services:

- Villedieu-les-Poêles – Mont-Saint-Michel
- Caen – Le Mans
- Rouen – Pont-Audemer
- Rouen – Caen
- Granville – Rennes
- Caen – Rennes
- Rouen – Louviers – Évreux – Verneuil-sur-Avre

Proxi (local) bus services:

- Fécamp – Bréauté
- Gisors – Serqueux – Dieppe
- Briouze – Bagnoles-de-l'Orne
- Argentan – Bagnoles-de-l'Orne
- Yvetot – Saint-Valery-en-Caux
- Alençon – Surdon
- Trouville-Deauville – Dives-Cabourg
- Argentan – Flers
- Lison – Granville

Seasonal services:

- Pontorson – Mont-Saint-Michel
- Bréauté – Étretat
- Bayeux – Colleville-sur-Mer – Arromanches-les-Bains

== See also ==
- Réseau Ferré de France
- List of SNCF stations in Normandy
