= Verneuil-sur-Avre station =

Railway station in Verneuil-sur-Avre, France

Verneuil-sur-Avre
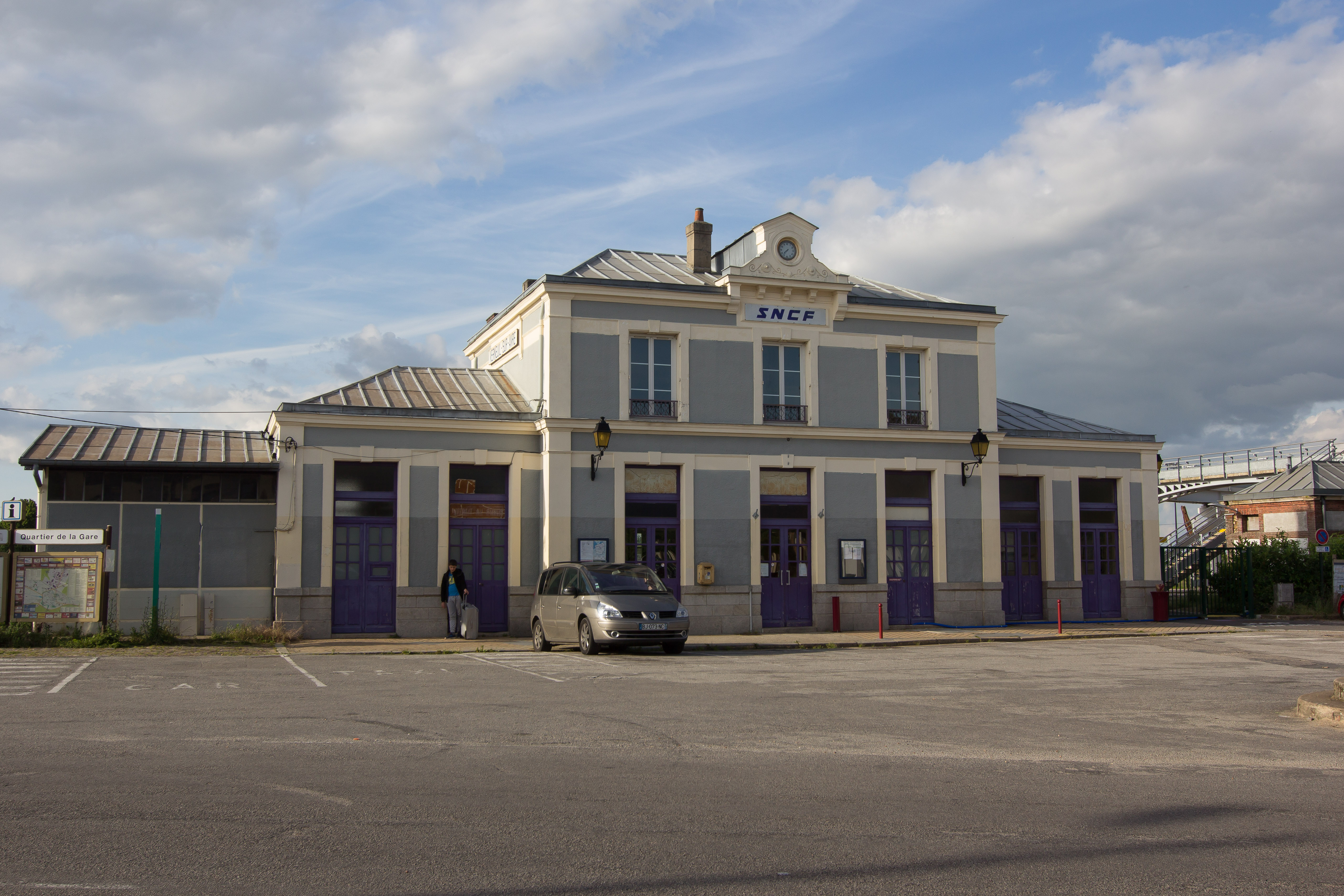
- Verneuil-sur-Avre station entrance

General information
- Location: Place de la Gare, 27130 Verneuil-sur-Avre; La Gare, France
- Coordinates: 48°44′33″N 0°55′45″E
- Elevation: 176 m (577 ft)
- Owner: SNCF
- Operator: SNCF
- Line: Paris to Granville
- Platforms: 2
- Tracks: 2
- Train operators: SNCF
- Connections: Nomad Train coaches (to Évreux); Local buses

Construction
- Structure type: at-ground level
- Parking: yes
- Cycle facilities: yes
- Accessible: step-free form train to street

Other information
- Station code: 87393595
- Website: SNCF Gares

History
- Opened: 1 October 1866

Passengers
- 2015: 147 977

Services
Preceding station	TER Normandie	Following station
Nonancourt towards Paris-Montparnasse	Krono	L'Aigle towards Granville
Location

Gare de Verneuil-sur-Avre is a railway station serving the town of Verneuil-sur-Avre, Eure, in northwestern France. The station is served by regional trains to Argentan, Paris and Granville.
