= Lison–Lamballe railway =

Rail line between Lison and Lamballe, France

- Map of the line

Overview
- Status: Operational
- Owner: RFF
- Locale: France (Normandy, Brittany)
- Termini: Lison; Lamballe

Service
- System: SNCF
- Operator(s): SNCF

History
- Opened: 1860 - 1879

Technical
- Line length: 205.7 km (127.8 mi)
- Number of tracks: Single track from Lison to Avranches; Double track from Avranches to Dol; Single track from Dol to Lamballe
- Track gauge: 1,435 mm (4 ft 8 1/2 in) standard gauge
- Electrification: 25 kV 50 Hz from Lison to St-Lô and a short section near Lamballe

The Lison–Lamballe railway is an important 205.7-kilometre long railway line that runs between the French commune of Lison and the town of Lamballe. It is used for passenger (express, regional and suburban) and freight traffic. The railway was opened in several stages between 1860 and 1879.

== Main stations ==
- Lison station
- Saint-Lô station
- Folligny station
- Dol-de-Bretagne station
- Dinan station
- Lamballe station

== Line history ==
The line was opened in several stages between 1860 and 1879.
