= Moult-Argences station =

Railway station in Moult, France

Coordinates: 49.1111°N 0.1861°W

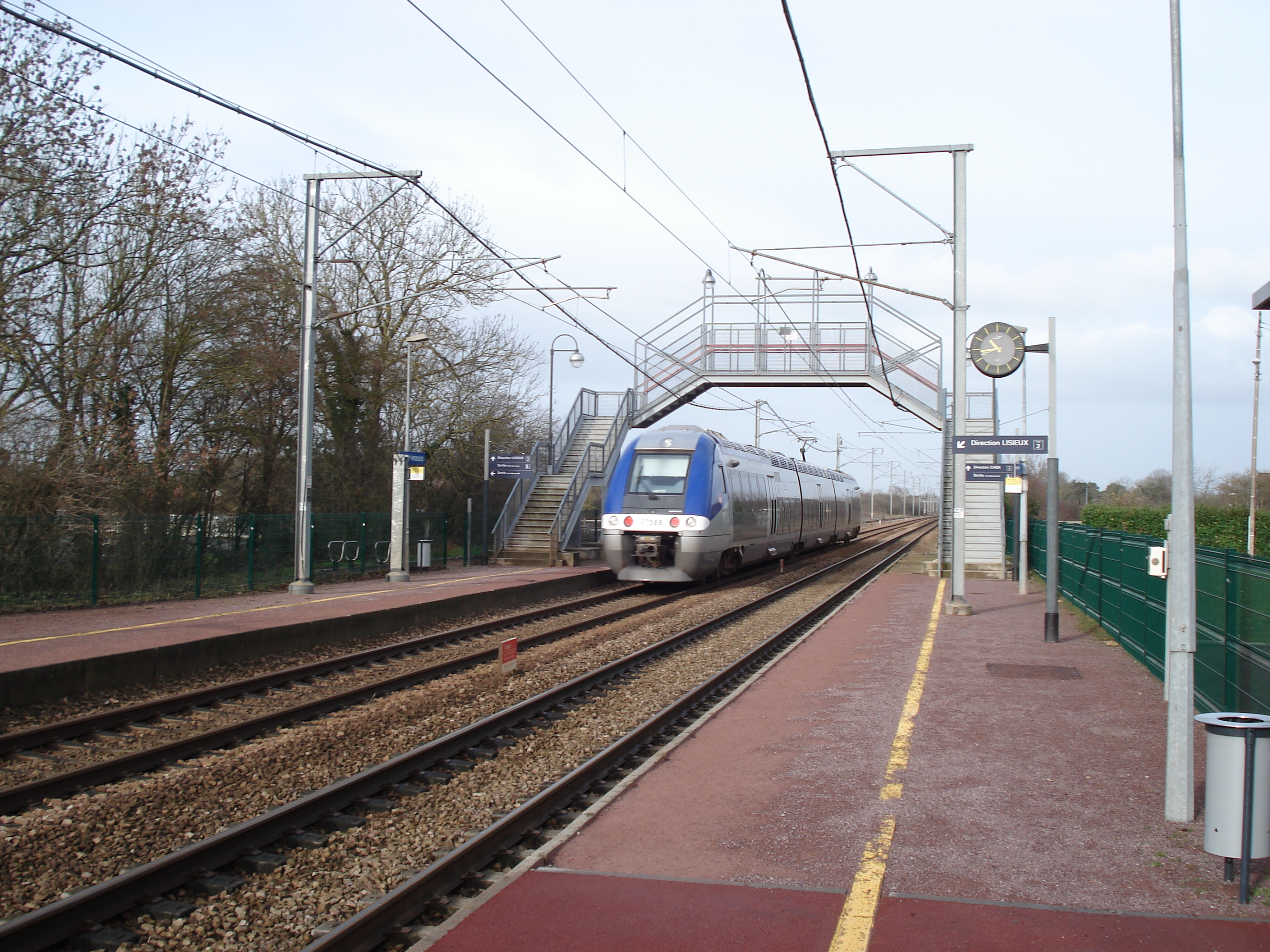
Moult Argences railway station in 2007

Moult-Argences is a train station in Moult, Calvados, Normandy, France. It is on the Mantes-la-Jolie to Cherbourg railway. It is served by regular trains to Caen and Lisieux and once a day by a train to Évreux and to Cherbourg.

The station is also served by Bus Verts du Calvados line 16 to Caen and Méry-Corbon.

Preceding station	TER Normandie	Following station
Frénouville-Cagny towards Caen	Citi	Mézidon towards Lisieux
