= SNCF Class X 4900 =

Class of 13 French 3-car diesel multiple units

X 4900
- X 4922 at Bernay station.
Type and origin
- Power type: Autorail
- Builder: ANF
- Build date: 1975 to 1979
Specifications
- Gauge: 1,435 mm (4 ft 8 1/2 in) standard gauge
- Length: 63.23 m (207 ft 5 in)
- Loco weight: 103.8 t (102.2 long tons; 114.4 short tons)
- Fuel type: Gazole
- Prime mover: Saurer SDHR by Saurer
- Engine type: Diesel engine
- Transmission: Hydraulic
Performance figures
- Maximum speed: 140 km/h (87 mph)
- Power output: 295 kW (396 hp) + 295 kW (396 hp) (591 kW or 793 hp)
Career
- Operators: SNCF
- Class: X 4900
- Number in class: 13
- Numbers: X 4901/2 à 4925/6
- Nicknames: Caravelle
- Locale: Basse-Normandie, Haute-Normandie

SNCF's X 4900 is a diesel multiple unit railroad car of the Caravelle family.

They are derived from the two-car X 4630 DMU with which they share the same Saurer 330 kW (440 hp) engines as well as their hydraulic gear box. The railcars possessed more power than the other Caravelles as they are formed of two motor coaches and one intermediate trailer, this authorised them to run at a top speed of 140 km/h (87 mph).

Aesthetics are different from the other Caravelles as the painting scheme chosen is English blue, white and grey. Interiors were designed with care and benches ignored in favour of individual seats.

The class was first allocated at Marseille-Blancarde engine shed, this led to the replacement of the X 2400 and X 2800 in the region. Their superior power led to their allocation to passenger service duties on steep gradient routes in the Southern Alps. The other members of the class were allocated to Sotteville-lès-Rouen engine shed.

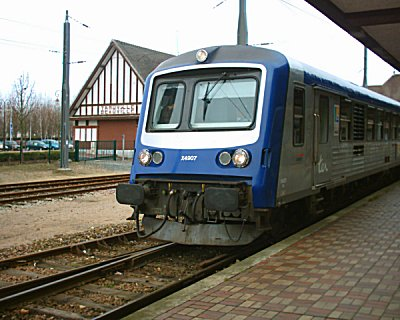
Renovated railcar X 4907 TER Haute Normandie at Trouville-Deauville station on 24 March 2005.

The 4900s in Normandy ran coupled to X 4500 and X 4750 around Caen, Rouen, and Le Mans and as far as Rennes and Tours. The Southern 4900s joined the Norman railcars upon the arrival of the BB 67400 at Marseille. Despite the arrival in Normandy of the X 72500 and particularly of the X 73500, the 4900 have been taken out of service but in fact have kept to their regular schedule. The X 76500 delivered in 2004 will run between Caen and Rouen along the 4900s.

The three trains belonging to Basse-Normandie received an extensive servicing at the beginning of the 2000s and kept their original livery. The 10 trains belonging to Haute-Normandie received the TER as well as a modernised cab, identical to that of the X 4630 renovated DMUs. Thanks to their reliability, the X 4900 will be kept for another fifteen years, unlike the X 4300 and X 4500 which will be retired.

== Inventory ==
2006 list of railcars of the X4900 class.

Train number	Depot	Transfers	Namings
X4901+XR8901+X4902	22 May 1975 at Marseille Blancarde	Sotteville-lès-Rouen	Veynes, 13 July 1975
X4903+XR8902+X4904	11 June 1975 at Marseille Blancarde	Sotteville-lès-Rouen	Manosque, 21 October 1978
X4905+XR8903+X4906	1 July 1975 at Marseille Blancarde	Sotteville-lès-Rouen	
X4907+XR8904+X4908	9 July 1975 at Marseille Blancarde	Sotteville-lès-Rouen	
X4909+XR8905+X4910	25 July 1975 at Marseille Blancarde	Sotteville-lès-Rouen	
X4911+XR8906+X4912	12 August 1975 at Marseille Blancarde	Sotteville-lès-Rouen	
X4913+XR8907+X4914	8 December 1976 at Sotteville-lès-Rouen		
X4915+XR8908+X4916	13 December 1976 at Sotteville-lès-Rouen		
X4917+XR8909+X4918	9 December 1976 at Sotteville-lès-Rouen		
X4919+XR8910+X4920	17 December 1975 at Sotteville-lès-Rouen		~~Sotteville, 23 September 1982~~
X4921+XR8911+X4922	12 January 1975 at Sotteville-lès-Rouen		
X4923+XR8912+X4924	10 January 1977 at Sotteville-lès-Rouen		
X4925+XR8913+X4926	18 January 1977 at Sotteville-lès-Rouen		
