= L'Aigle station =

Railway station in L'Aigle, France

Coordinates: 48°45′59″N 0°37′15″E

L'Aigle
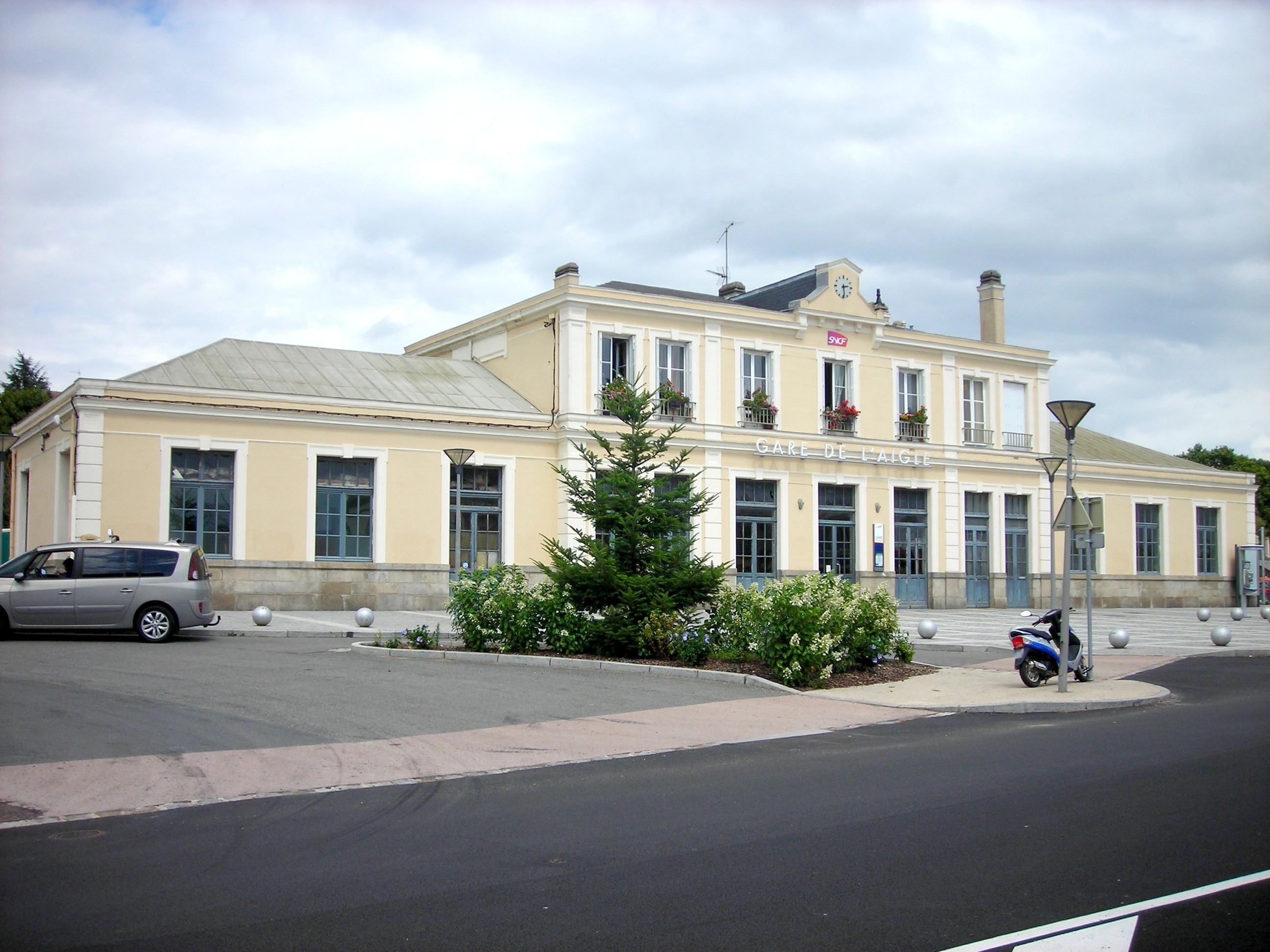

General information
- Location: Rue du Général de Gaulle; 61300 L'Aigle; Orne, France
- Owner: SNCF
- Operator: SNCF

Other information
- Station code: 87444638

History
- Opened: 1 October 1866
Location

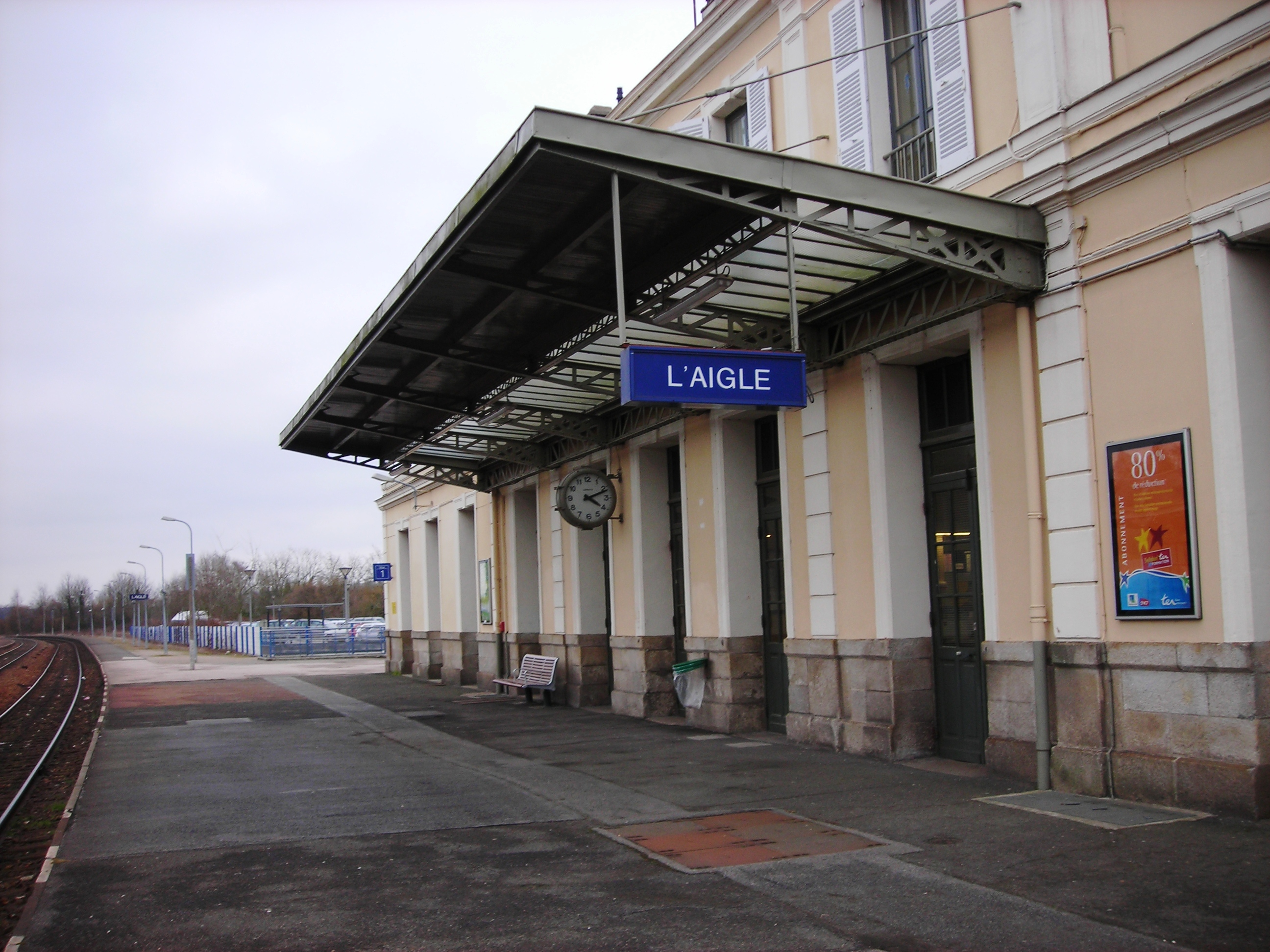
The station

L'Aigle station (French: Gare de L'Aigle) is a railway station serving the town L'Aigle, Orne department, northwestern France.

== Services ==
The station is served by regional trains to Argentan, Paris and Granville.

Preceding station	TER Normandie	Following station
Verneuil-sur-Avre towards Paris-Montparnasse	Krono	Sainte-Gauburge towards Granville
