= Vire station =

Railway station in Vire, France

Coordinates: 48°50′49″N 0°52′51″W

Vire
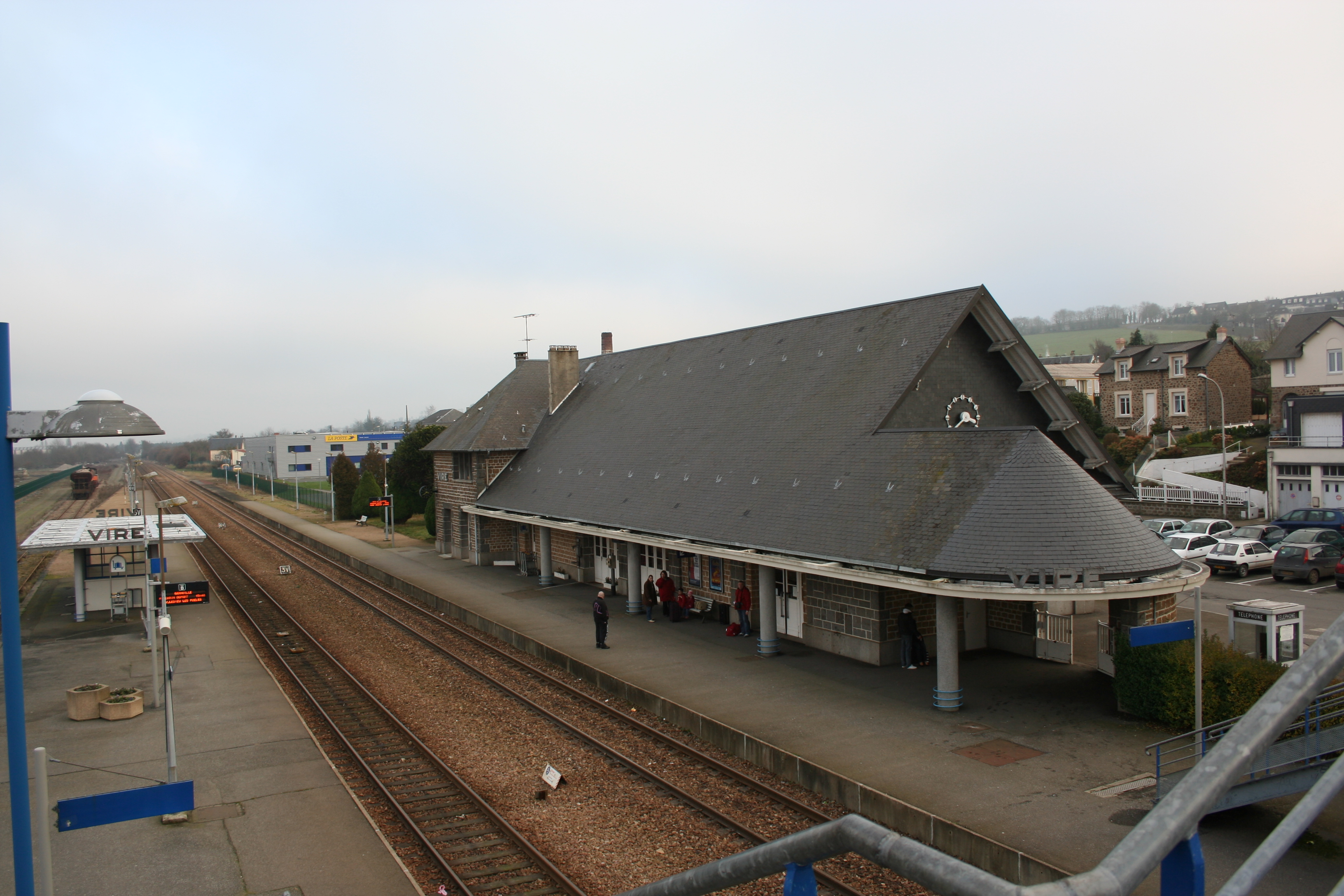
- Vire station entrance

General information
- Location: Place de la gare, 14500 Vire-Normandie; France
- Elevation: 176 m (577 ft)
- Owner: SNCF
- Operator: SNCF
- Line: Paris to Granville
- Platforms: 2
- Tracks: 3
- Train operators: SNCF

Construction
- Structure type: at-ground level
- Parking: yes
- Cycle facilities: yes
- Accessible: step-free from train to street

Other information
- Station code: 87448159
- Website: SNCF Gares

History
- Opened: 1 October 1866

Passengers
- 2015: 147 977

Services
Preceding station	TER Normandie	Following station
Flers towards Paris-Montparnasse	Krono	Villedieu-les-Poêles towards Granville
Flers towards Paris-Montparnasse	Seasonal	Villedieu-les-Poêles towards Pontorson-Mont-St-Michel
Location

Gare de Vire is a railway station serving the subprefecture of Vire-Normandie, Calvados department, northwestern France.

== Services ==
The station is served by regional trains to Argentan, Paris and Granville.

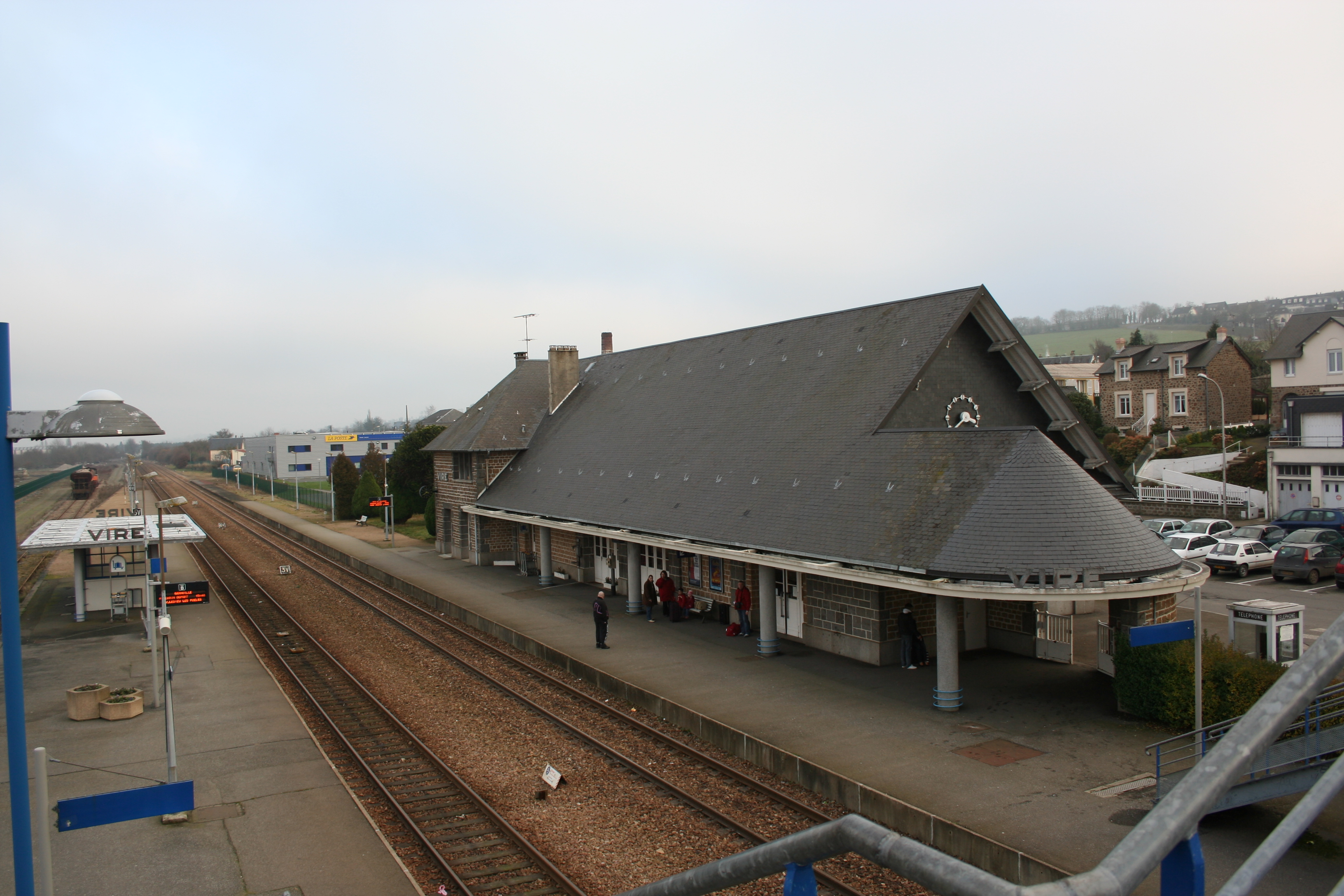
Platform 1 & 2 from the former footbridge
