= Beuzeville-la-Grenier =

- Commune
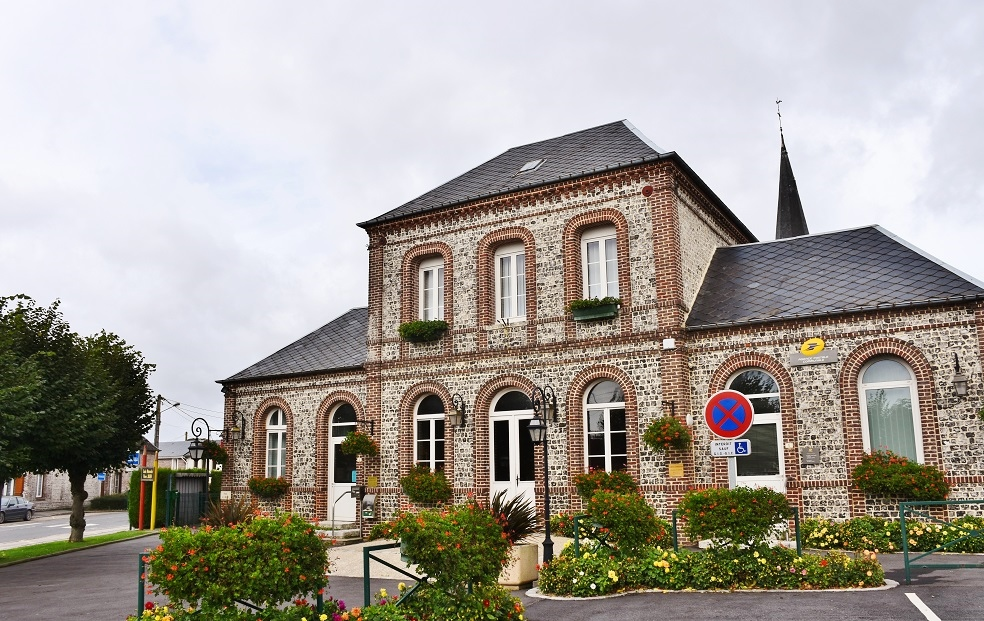
- The town hall in Beuzeville-la-Grenier

- Coat of arms
- Location of Beuzeville-la-Grenier
- Location within France Location within Normandy
- Coordinates: 49°35′35″N 0°25′38″E
- Country: France
- Region: Normandy
- Department: Seine-Maritime
- Arrondissement: Le Havre
- Canton: Bolbec
- Intercommunality: Caux Seine Agglo
- Area^{1}: 6.19 km^{2} (2.39 sq mi)
- Elevation: 114 m (374 ft)
- Highest elevation: 127 m (417 ft)
- Lowest elevation: 94 m (308 ft)
- Population (2023): 1,197
  - Density: 193/km^{2} (501/sq mi)
- Time zone: UTC+01:00 (CET)
  - Summer (DST): UTC+02:00 (CEST)
- INSEE/Postal code: 76090 /76210
- ^{1} French Land Register data, which excludes lakes, ponds, glaciers > 1 km^{2} (0.386 sq mi or 247 acres) and river estuaries.

Beuzeville-la-Grenier (French pronunciation: [bøzvil la ɡʁənje]) is a commune in the Seine-Maritime department in the Normandy region in northern France.

== Geography ==
A farming village situated in the Pays de Caux, some 13 miles (21 km) northeast of Le Havre, at the junction of the D910 and the D112 roads. Junction 7 of the A29 autoroute forms the commune's southern border. Bréauté-Beuzeville station has rail connections to Rouen, Le Havre, Fécamp and Paris.

== Heraldry ==
Arms of Beuzeville-la-Grenier	The arms of Beuzeville-la-Grenier are blazoned : Vert, a tower argent overall 2 leopards gules.

== Population ==
Historical population
Year	Pop.	±% p.a.
1968	773	—
1975	704	−1.33%
1982	868	+3.04%
1990	1,014	+1.96%
1999	1,035	+0.23%
2007	1,027	−0.10%
2012	1,101	+1.40%
2017	1,227	+2.19%
2023	1,197	−0.41%
Source: INSEE

== Places of interest ==
- The church of St.Martin, dating from the eleventh century.
- A manorhouse and chateau of the 16th century.

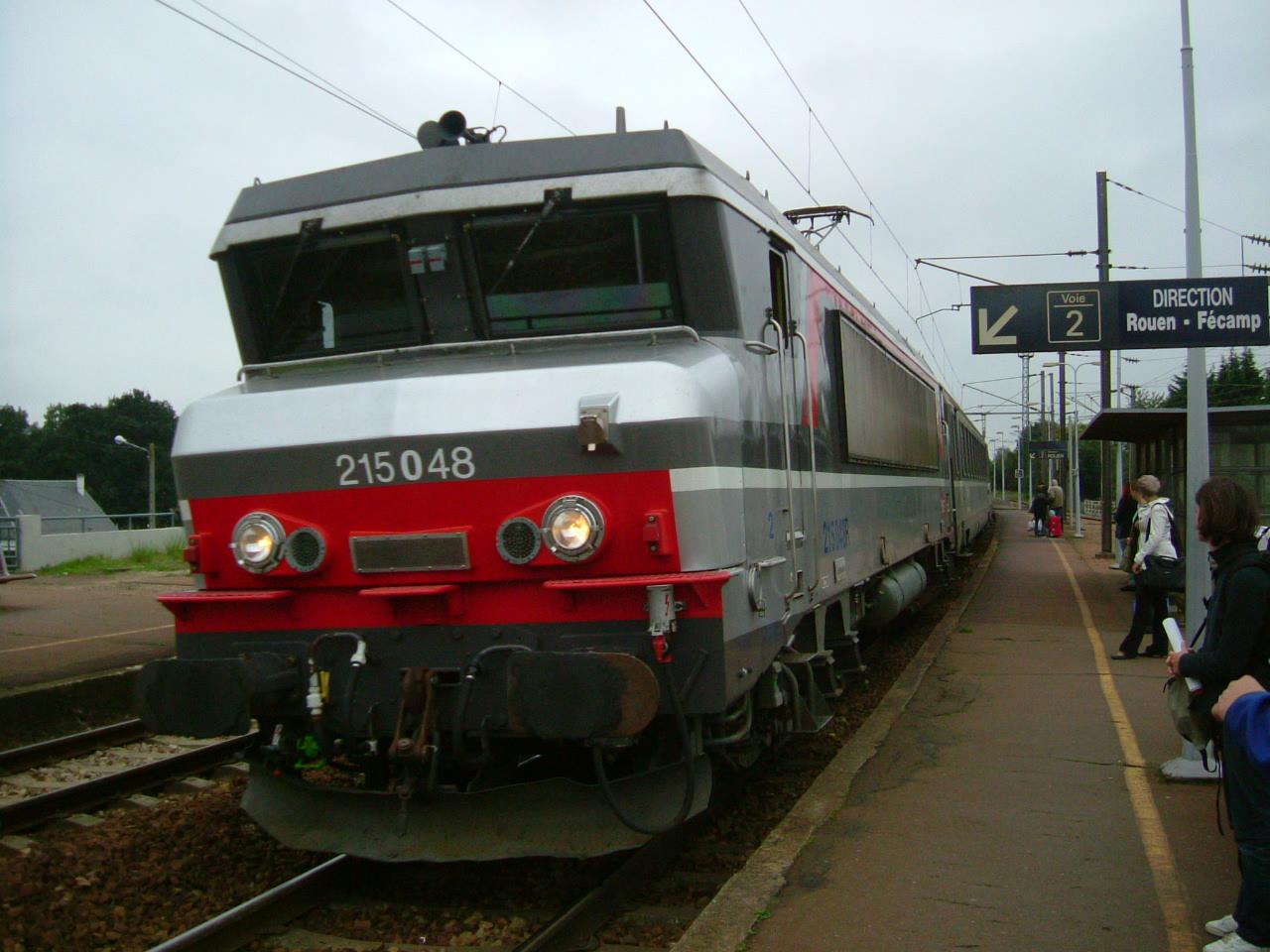
SNCF Class BB locomotive at Bréauté-Beuzeville station

== See also ==
- Communes of the Seine-Maritime department
