= Flers station =

Railway station in Flers, France

Coordinates: 48°44′40″N 0°34′24″W

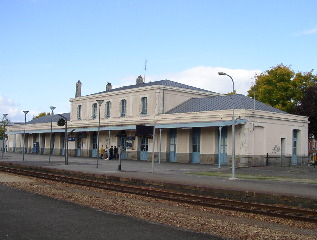
Flers station

Gare de Flers is a railway station serving the town Flers, Orne department, northwestern France. The station was inaugurated in 1866.

== Services ==
The station is served by regional trains to Argentan, Paris and Granville.

Preceding station	TER Normandie	Following station
Briouze towards Paris-Montparnasse	Krono	Vire towards Granville
Briouze towards Paris-Montparnasse	Seasonal	Vire towards Pontorson-Mont-St-Michel
