= Villedieu-les-Poêles station =

Railway station in Villedieu-les-Poêles, France

Coordinates: 48°50′3″N 1°13′34″W

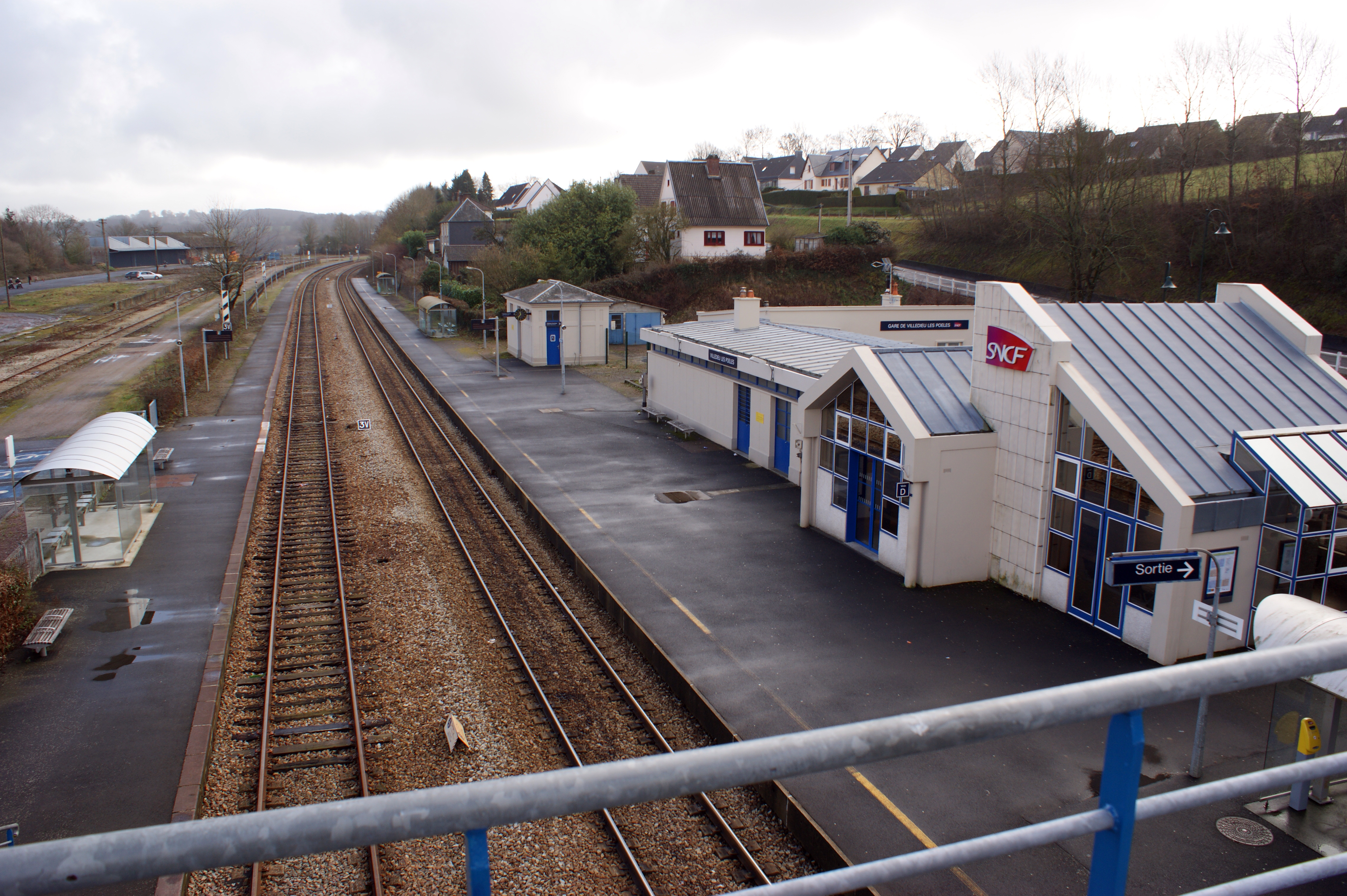
Villedieu-les-Poêles station

Gare de Villedieu-les-Poêles is a railway station serving the town Villedieu-les-Poêles, Manche Department, Normandy, northwestern France.

== Services ==
The station is served by regional trains to Argentan, Paris and Granville.

Preceding station	TER Normandie	Following station
Vire towards Paris-Montparnasse	Krono	Folligny towards Granville
Vire towards Paris-Montparnasse	Seasonal	Folligny towards Pontorson-Mont-St-Michel
