= Surdon station =

Railway station in Le Château-d'Almenêches, France

Coordinates: 48°39′57″N 0°7′56″E

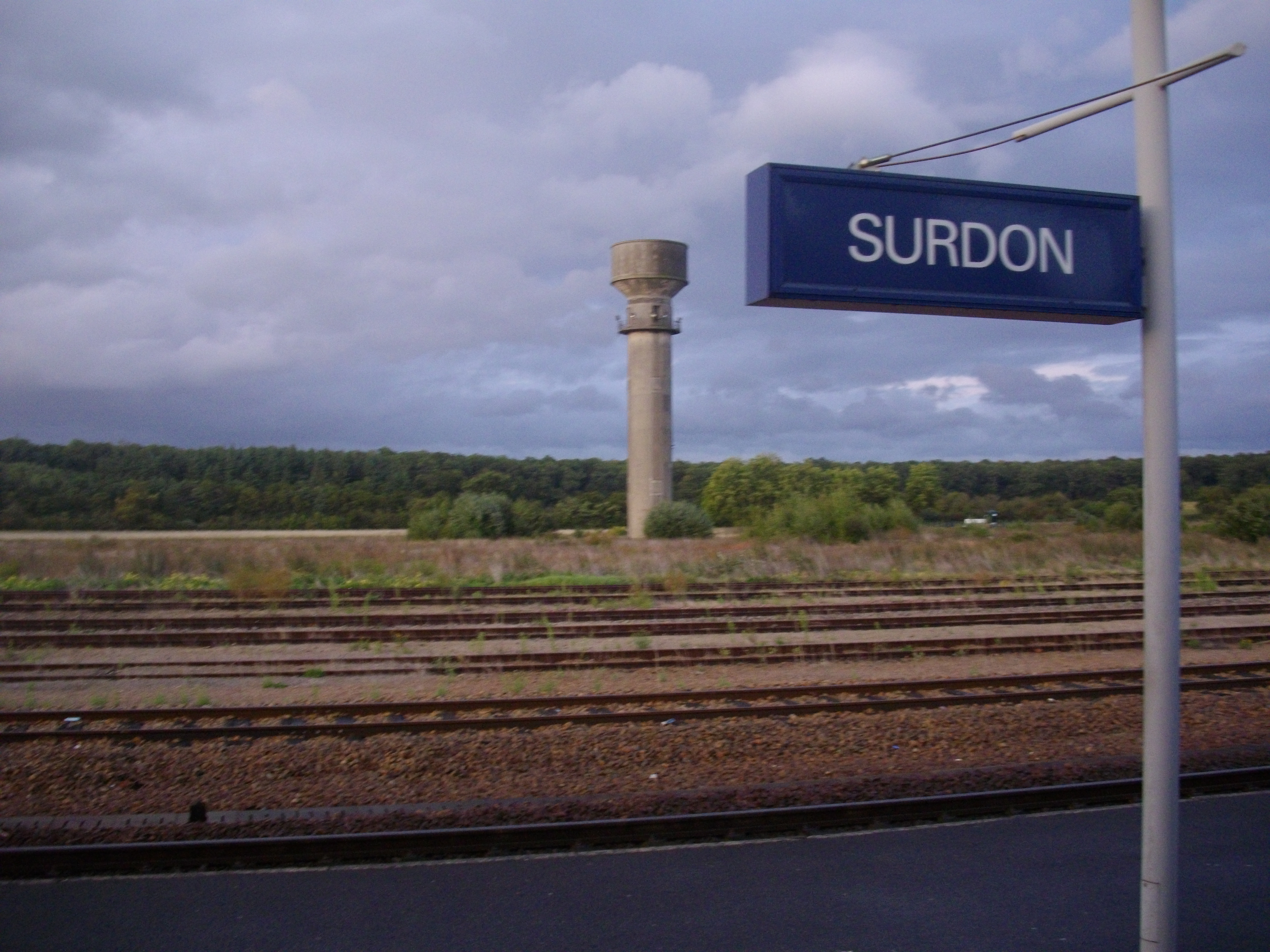
Gare de Surdon railway

Gare de Surdon is a railway station serving the village Le Château-d'Almenêches, Orne department, northwestern France.

== Services ==
The station is served by regional trains to Argentan, Caen, Paris, Le Mans and Granville.

== Railway situation ==
Located at an elevation of 173 metres (568 ft), Surdon station is situated at kilometre point (PK) 84.347 on the Le Mans–Mézidon railway, between the open stations of Alençon and Argentan. It is separated from Alençon by Sées station, and from Argentan by the demolished station of Almenèches.

| Preceding station | TER Normandie | Following station |
|---|---|---|
| Sainte-Gauburge towards Paris-Montparnasse | Krono | Argentan towards Granville |
| Sainte-Gauburge towards Paris-Montparnasse | Seasonal | Argentan towards Pontorson-Mont-St-Michel |
| Argentan towards Caen | Krono | Sées towards Le Mans |
