= Bayeux station =

Railway station in Normandy, France

Coordinates: 49°16′11″N 0°41′53″W

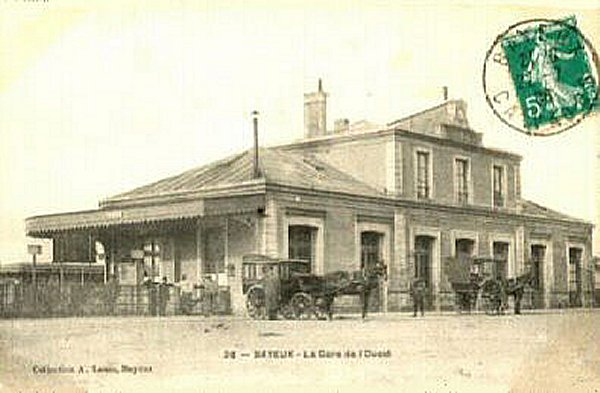
Bayeux station in the early 20th century.

Bayeux station (French: Gare de Bayeux) is the train station for the town of Bayeux, Calvados, Normandy. It is situated on the Mantes-la-Jolie–Cherbourg railway.

It is a small station with regional trains (TER) to Cherbourg, Caen, Paris and Granville.

Preceding station	TER Normandie	Following station
Caen towards Paris-Saint-Lazare	Krono+	Lison towards Cherbourg
Caen Terminus	Krono	Lison towards Cherbourg
Audrieu towards Caen	Citi	Le Molay-Littry towards Granville
