= Briouze station =

Railway station in Briouze, France

Coordinates: 48°42′7″N 0°22′6″W

Briouze
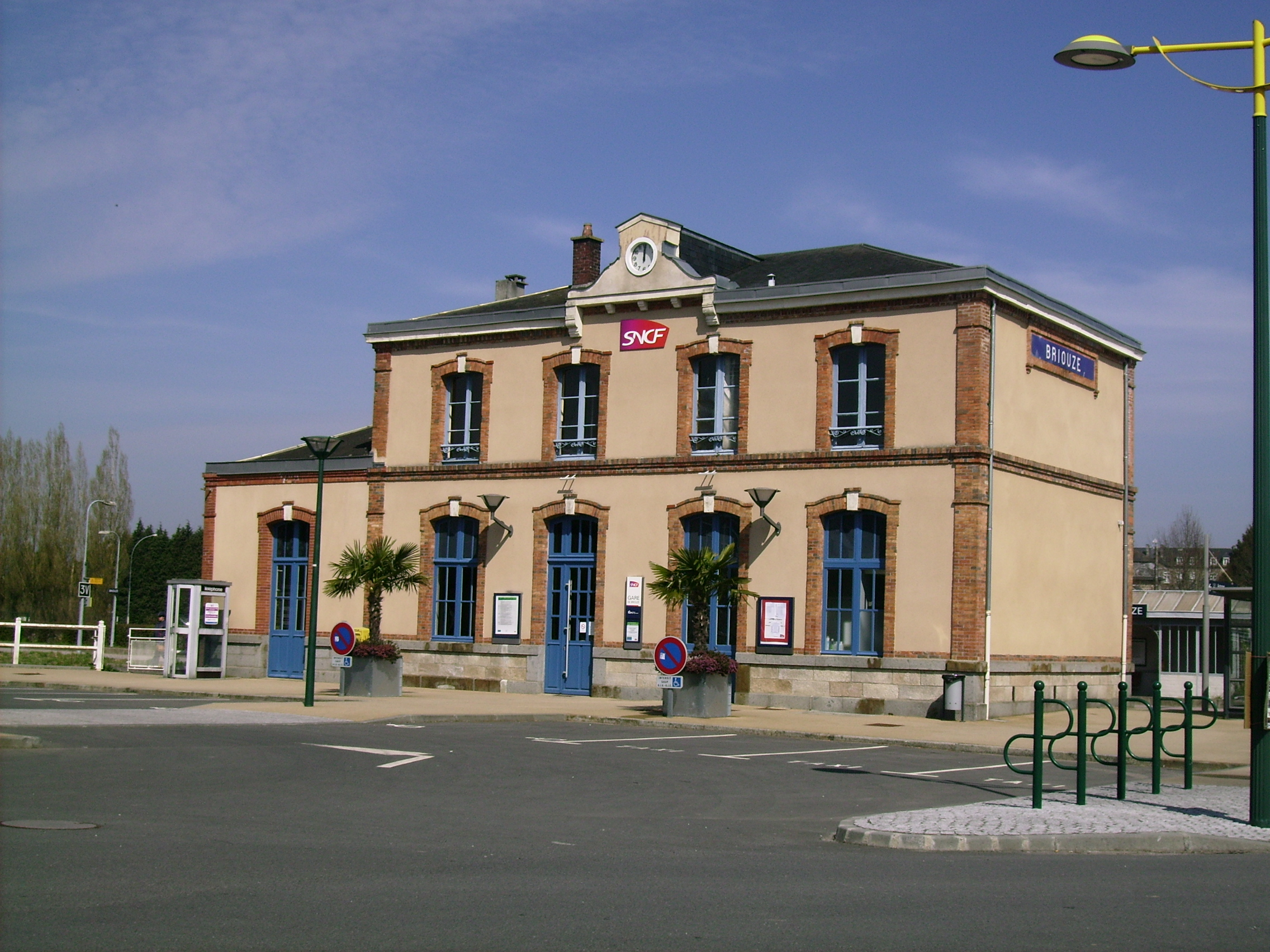

General information
- Location: Place de la Gare; 61200 Briouze
- Elevation: 212 m (696 ft)
- Owner: SNCF
- Operator: SNCF
- Platforms: 2
- Tracks: 2

Other information
- Station code: 87448084

History
- Opened: 2 July 1866

Passengers
- 2016: 29,002

Services
Preceding station	TER Normandie	Following station
Argentan towards Paris-Montparnasse	Krono	Flers towards Granville
Argentan towards Paris-Montparnasse	Seasonal	Flers towards Pontorson-Mont-St-Michel
Location

Briouze station (French: Gare de Briouze) is a railway station serving the town Briouze, Orne department, northwestern France.

== Services ==
The station is served by regional trains to Argentan, Paris and Granville.
