= Lison station =

Railway station in Lison, Calvados, France

Coordinates: 49°13′38″N 1°3′27″W

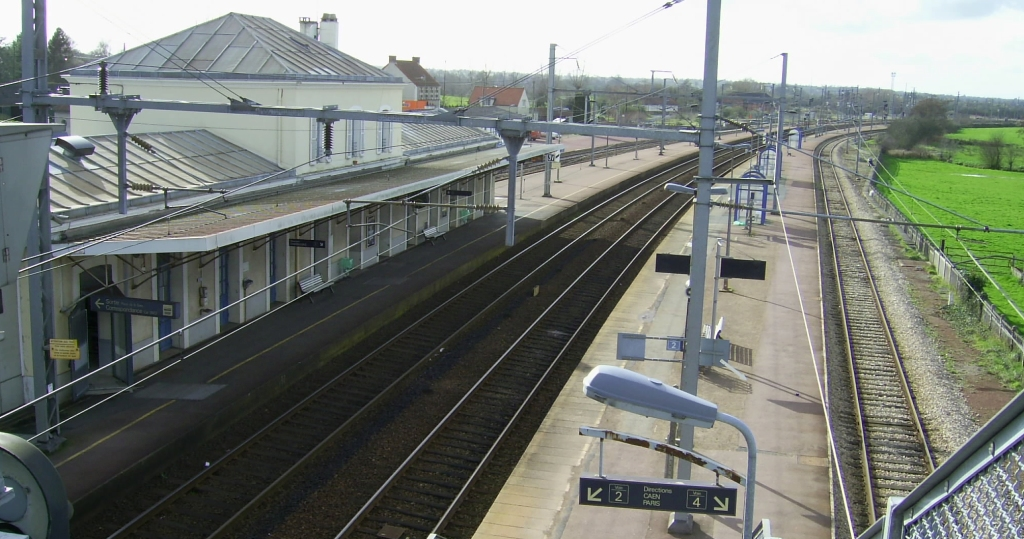
Lison station

Lison station (French: Gare de Lison) is a railway station serving the town of Lison, Calvados department, northwestern France. It is situated at the junction of the Mantes-la-Jolie–Cherbourg railway and the Lison–Lamballe railway.

The station is served by regional trains to Cherbourg, Caen, Paris and Granville. Several bus routes also serve this station to connect passengers to nearby towns such as Bayeux, Carentan and Le Molay-Littry. The station has ticket machines for customers to buy tickets before their journey as well as an automated car parking system for those travelling by car.

The station building has been designed in the traditional French style with arched windows and stone walls which give it an attractive look from the outside. Inside there are several shops and cafes offering refreshments for passengers on their journeys. There is also a waiting area with comfortable seating and free Wi-Fi access for travelers during their wait times.

In 2018, Lison station was rated one of the cleanest train stations in France due to its efficient cleaning staff that ensures that all areas are kept spick and span at all times. The station also features several green initiatives such as solar panels on its roof which helps reduce its environmental footprint while keeping energy costs down.

== Services ==
The station is served by regional trains to Cherbourg, Caen, Paris and Granville.

Preceding station	TER Normandie	Following station
Bayeux towards Paris-Saint-Lazare	Krono+	Carentan towards Cherbourg
Bayeux towards Caen	Krono	Carentan towards Cherbourg
Le Molay-Littry towards Caen	Citi	Saint-Lô towards Granville
