= Sées station =

Railway station in Sées, France

Coordinates: 48°36′0″N 0°9′58″E

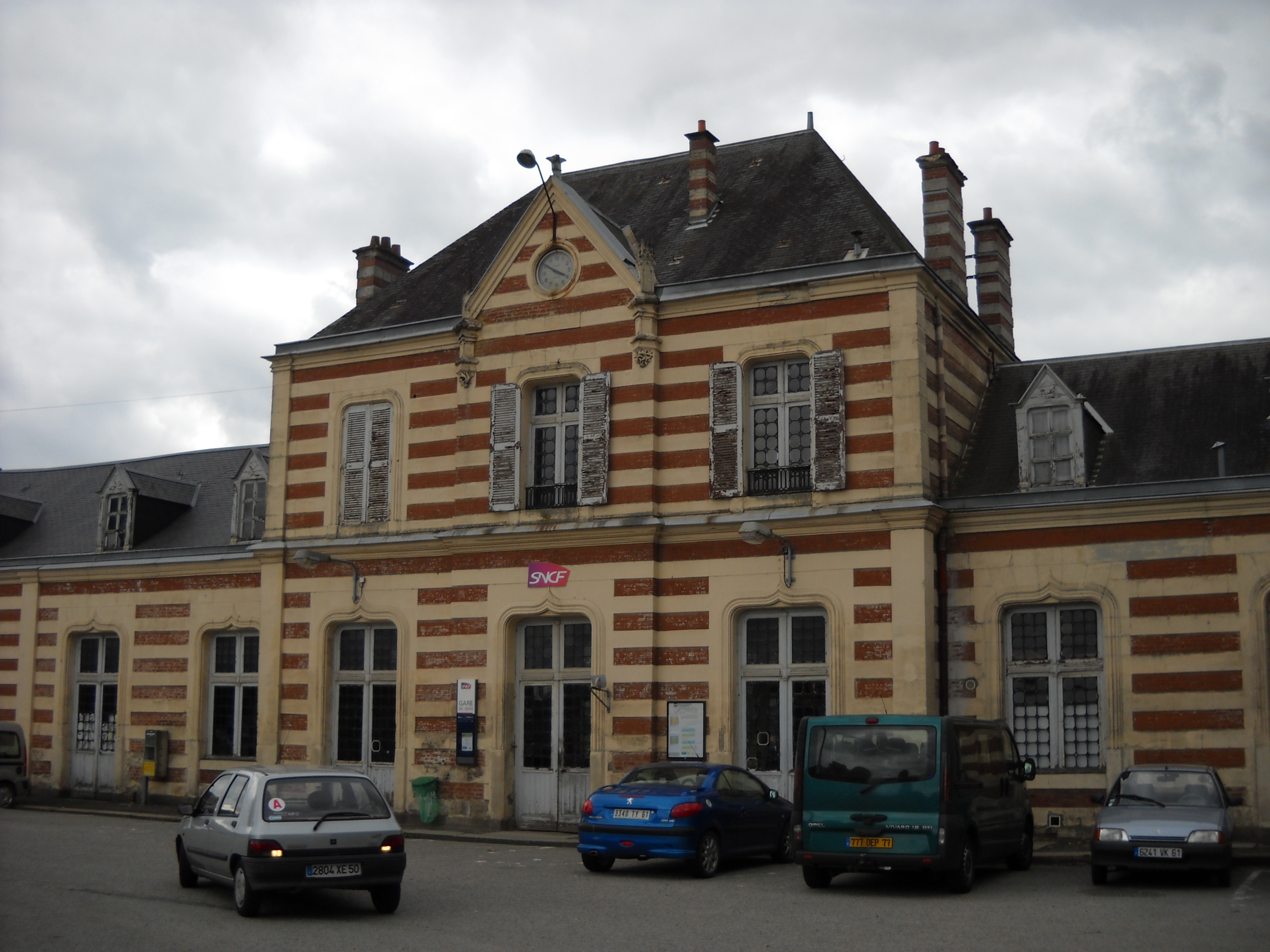
Sées - Train station

Sées station (French: Gare de Sées) is a railway station serving the town Sées, Orne department, northwestern France.

== Services ==
The station is served by regional trains to Argentan, Caen and Le Mans.

Preceding station	TER Normandie	Following station
Surdon towards Caen	Krono	Alençon towards Le Mans
