= Folligny station =

Railway station in Folligny, France

Coordinates: 48°49′48″N 1°24′27″W

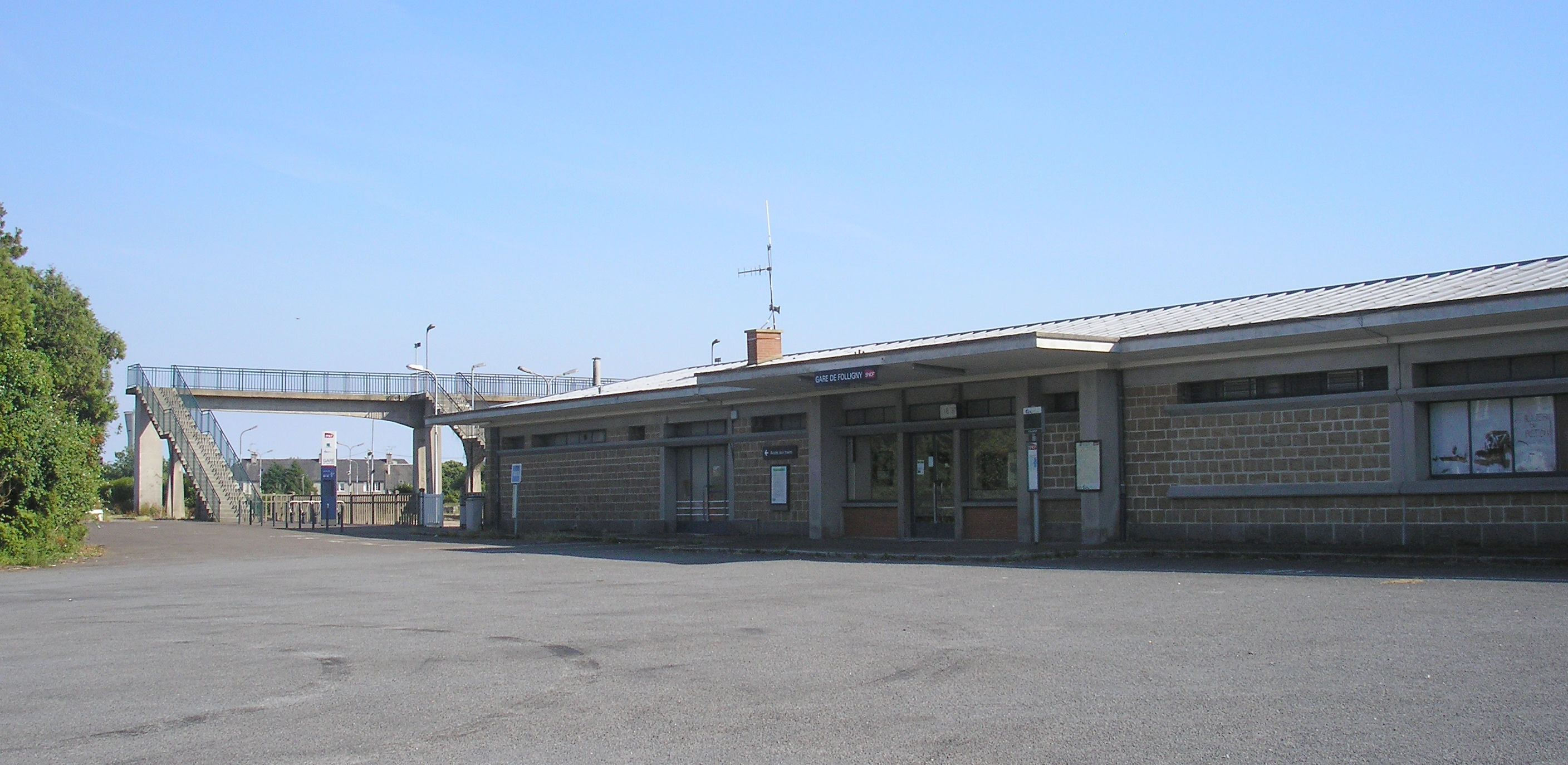
Folligny station

Folligny station (French: Gare de Folligny) is a railway station serving the town Folligny, Manche department, northwestern France. It is situated on the Lison–Lamballe railway.

== Services ==
The station is served by regional trains to Granville, Argentan, Caen, Paris and Rennes.

Preceding station	TER Normandie	Following station
Villedieu-les-Poêles towards Paris-Montparnasse	Krono	Granville Terminus
Villedieu-les-Poêles towards Paris-Montparnasse	Seasonal	Avranches towards Pontorson-Mont-St-Michel
Granville Terminus	Citi	Avranches towards Rennes
