= Harfleur station =

Railway station in Harfleur, France

Coordinates: 49°30′49″N 0°11′57″E

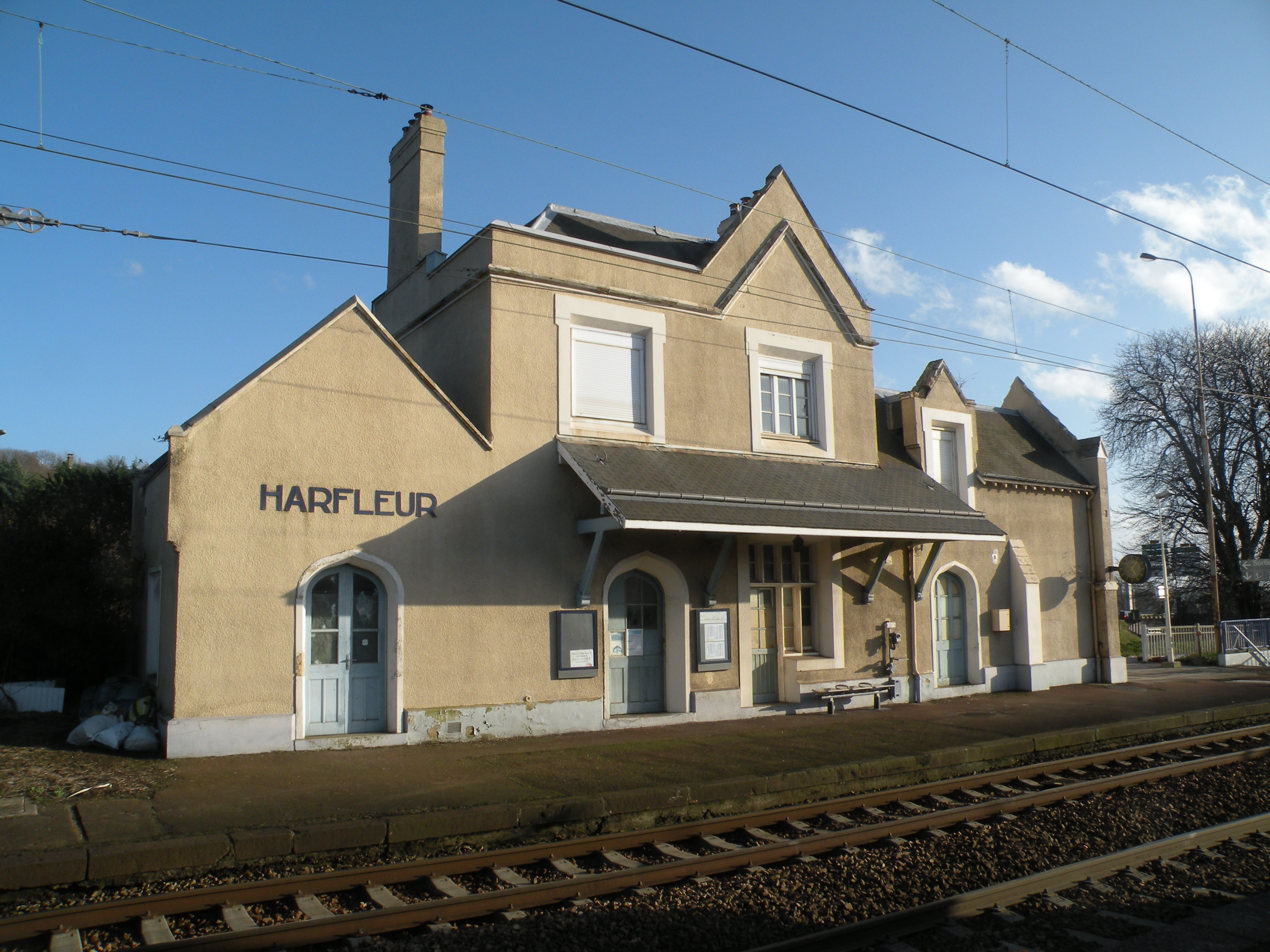
The station in 2010

Harfleur is a suburban railway station in Harfleur near Le Havre, France. It is situated on the Paris–Le Havre railway. Services are provided by SNCF branded TER Normandie regional rail network:

Preceding station	TER Normandie	Following station
Le Havre Terminus	Proxi	Saint-Laurent-Gainneville towards Fécamp
