= Mézidon station =

Railway station in Mézidon-Canon, France

Coordinates: 49°4′15″N 0°4′30″W

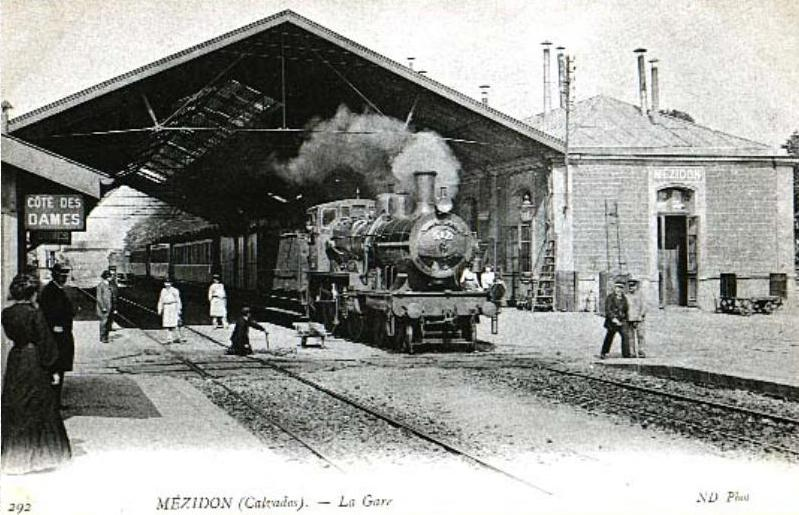
Mézidon station around 1900

Gare de Mézidon is a railway station serving the town Mézidon-Canon, Calvados department, Normandy, northwestern France.

It is situated on the Mantes-la-Jolie–Cherbourg railway.

== Services ==
The station is served by regional trains to Argentan, Caen, Lisieux and Rouen.

Preceding station	TER Normandie	Following station
Caen Terminus	Krono	Lisieux towards Rouen-RD
Caen Terminus	Krono	Saint-Pierre-sur-Dives towards Le Mans
Moult-Argences towards Caen	Citi	Lisieux Terminus
