= Le Grand-Jardin station =

Railway station in Lisieux, France

Coordinates: 49°09′01″N 0°13′38″E

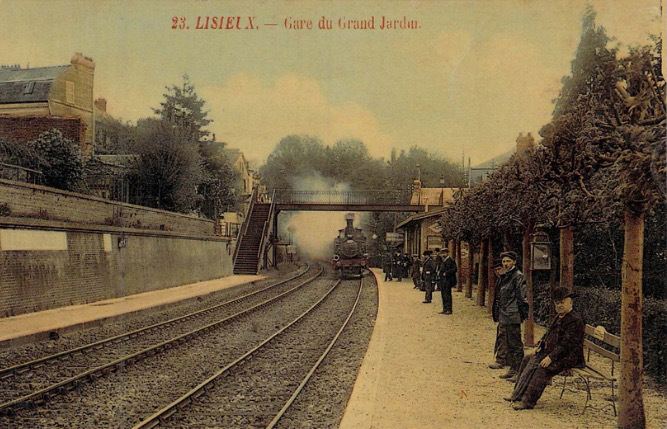
The station in 1900

Gare du Grand-Jardin is the second station of Lisieux, Normandy. The station is only used by local services on the line from Lisieux (the main station of Lisieux) to Trouville-Deauville. Le Grand-Jardin station is a public transportation hub known for its convenient location and efficient services.

The station is named Le Grand-Jardin because of the Jardin de l'Éveché nearby.

| Preceding station | TER Normandie | Following station |
|---|---|---|
| Lisieux Terminus | Proxi | Pont-l'Évêque towards Trouville-Deauville |
