= Évreux-Normandie station =

Railway station in Évreux, France

Coordinates: 49°1′7″N 1°8′59″E

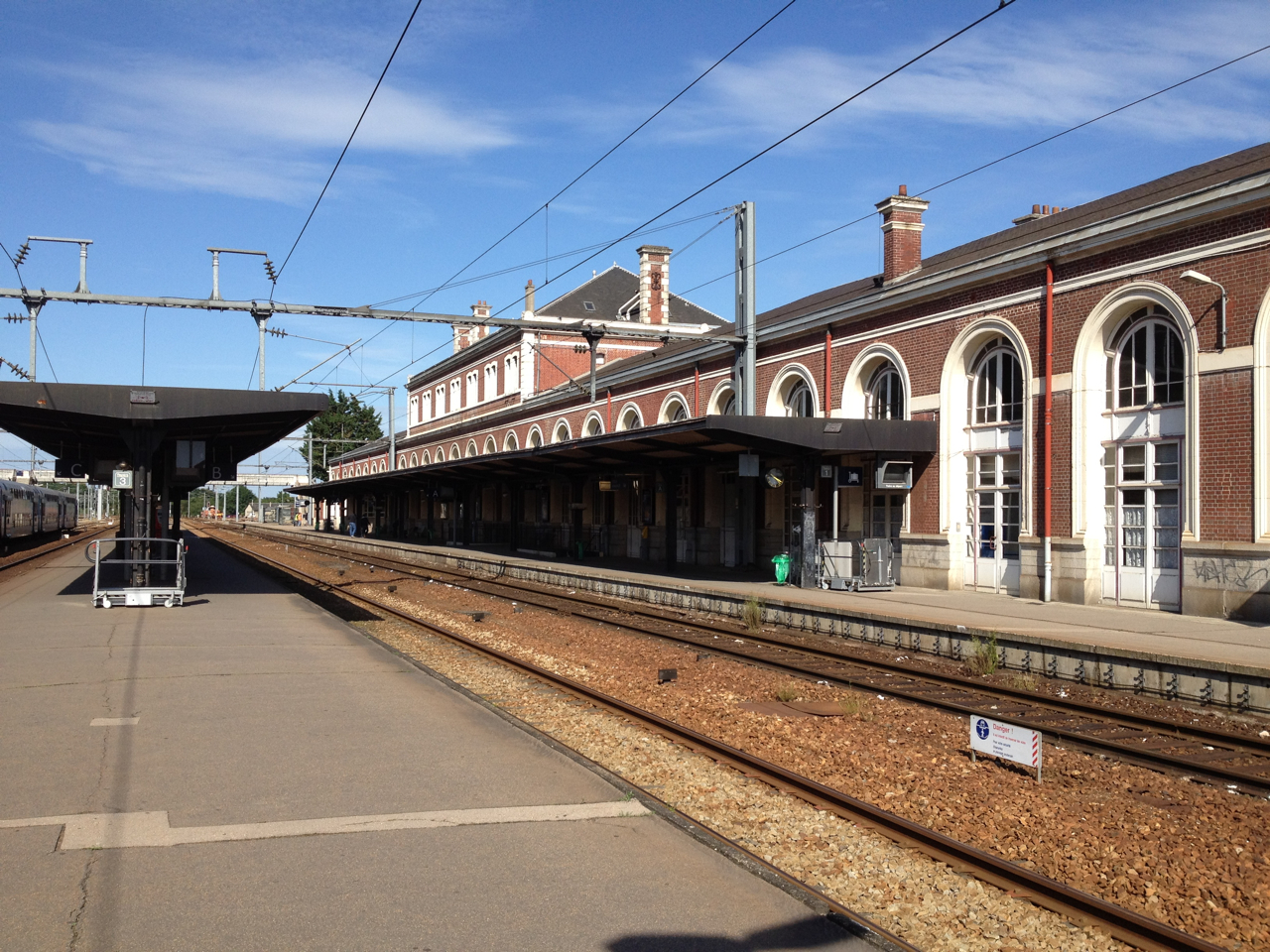
Gare d'Évreux-Normandie

Évreux-Normandie (until recently: Évreux Embranchement) is the train station for the town of Évreux, Eure, France. It was built by CF de l'Ouest in 1887 (the line opened in 1855).

The station was named Embranchement as it stands at the junction of the lines to Paris and to Rouen. The line to Rouen is now closed but a disused freight line to the northern suburbs of Évreux remains. The station building was heavily bombed during World War II but rebuilt identically to the original building afterwards.

Évreux-Normandie is on the main line from Paris to Cherbourg (Mantes-la-Jolie–Cherbourg railway) and is the main stop for regional double-decker trains (TER Normandie) from Paris to Serquigny.

Preceding station	TER Normandie	Following station
Paris-Saint-Lazare Terminus	Krono+	Bernay towards Cherbourg
Paris-Saint-Lazare Terminus	Krono+	Bernay towards Trouville-Deauville
La Bonneville-sur-Iton towards Serquigny	Citi	Bueil towards Paris-Saint-Lazare

== See also ==
- Évreux-Nord station
