= Bréauté–Beuzeville station =

Railway station in Bréauté, France

Bréauté–Beuzeville
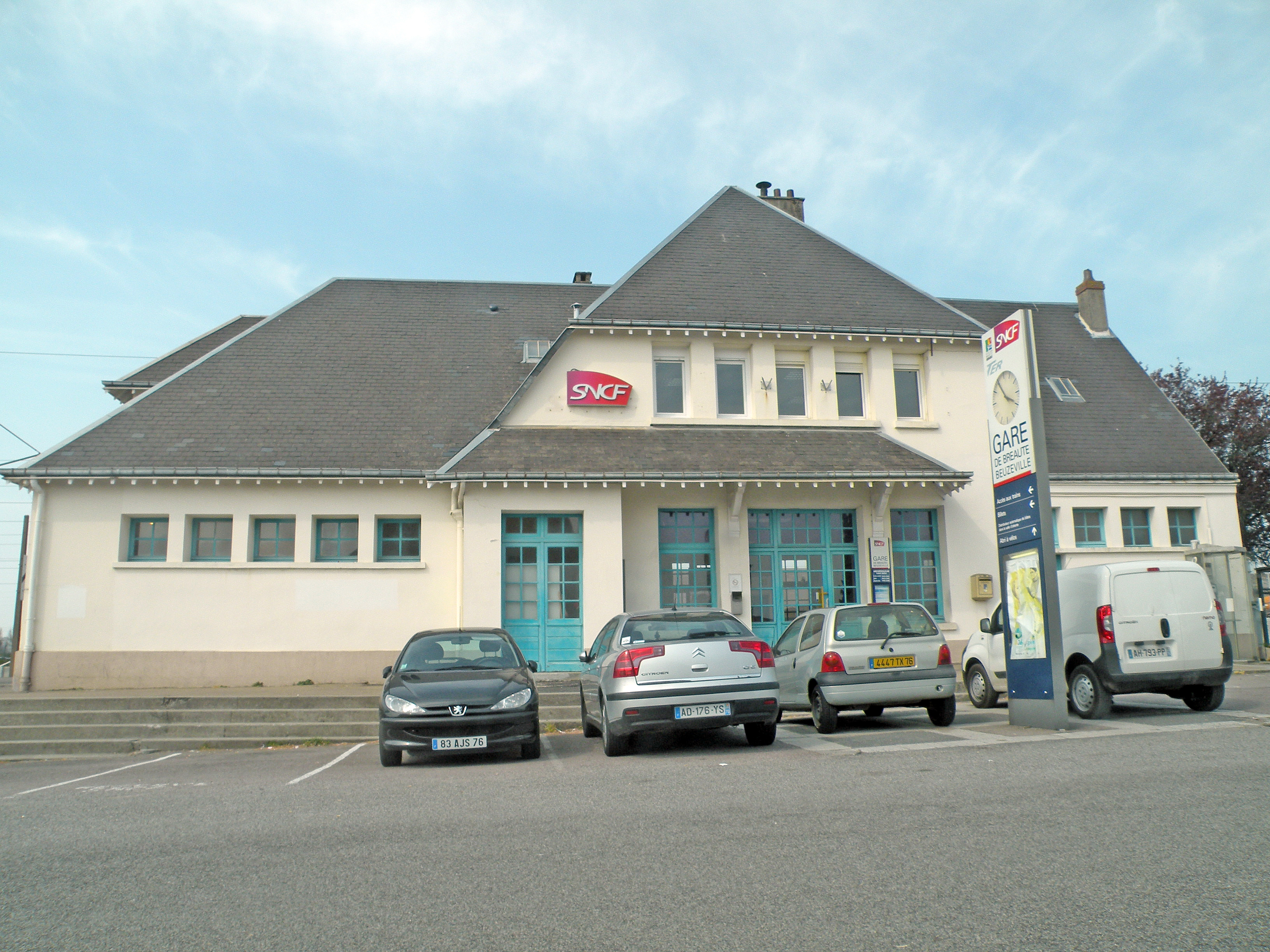
- Bréauté-Beuzeville railway station

General information
- Location: Beuzeville-la-Grenier, Normandy, France
- Coordinates: 49°36′12″N 0°25′03″E
- Lines: Paris–Le Havre railway, Bréauté-Beuzeville–Fécamp railway, Bréauté-Beuzeville–Gravenchon - Port-Jérôme railway

Other information
- Station code: 87413344

History
- Opened: 22 March 1847

Services
Preceding station	TER Normandie	Following station
Yvetot towards Paris-Saint-Lazare	Krono+	Le Havre Terminus
Foucart-Alvimare towards Rouen-RD	Proxi	Étainhus-Saint-Romain towards Le Havre
Étainhus-Saint-Romain towards Le Havre	Proxi	Fécamp Terminus
Location

Bréauté–Beuzeville is a railway station located in Beuzeville-la-Grenier, Seine-Maritime, France. The station was opened on 22 March 1847 and is located on the Paris–Le Havre railway, Bréauté-Beuzeville–Fécamp railway and Bréauté-Beuzeville–Gravenchon - Port-Jérôme railway. The train services are operated by SNCF.

== Train services ==
The station is served by the following services:

- Regional services (TER Normandie) Le Havre - Bréauté-Beuzeville - Yvetot - Rouen - Paris
- Local services (TER Normandie) Le Havre - Bréauté-Beuzeville - Fécamp
