= Bernay station =

Railway station in Bernay, France

Coordinates: 49°5′14″N 0°35′45″E

Bernay
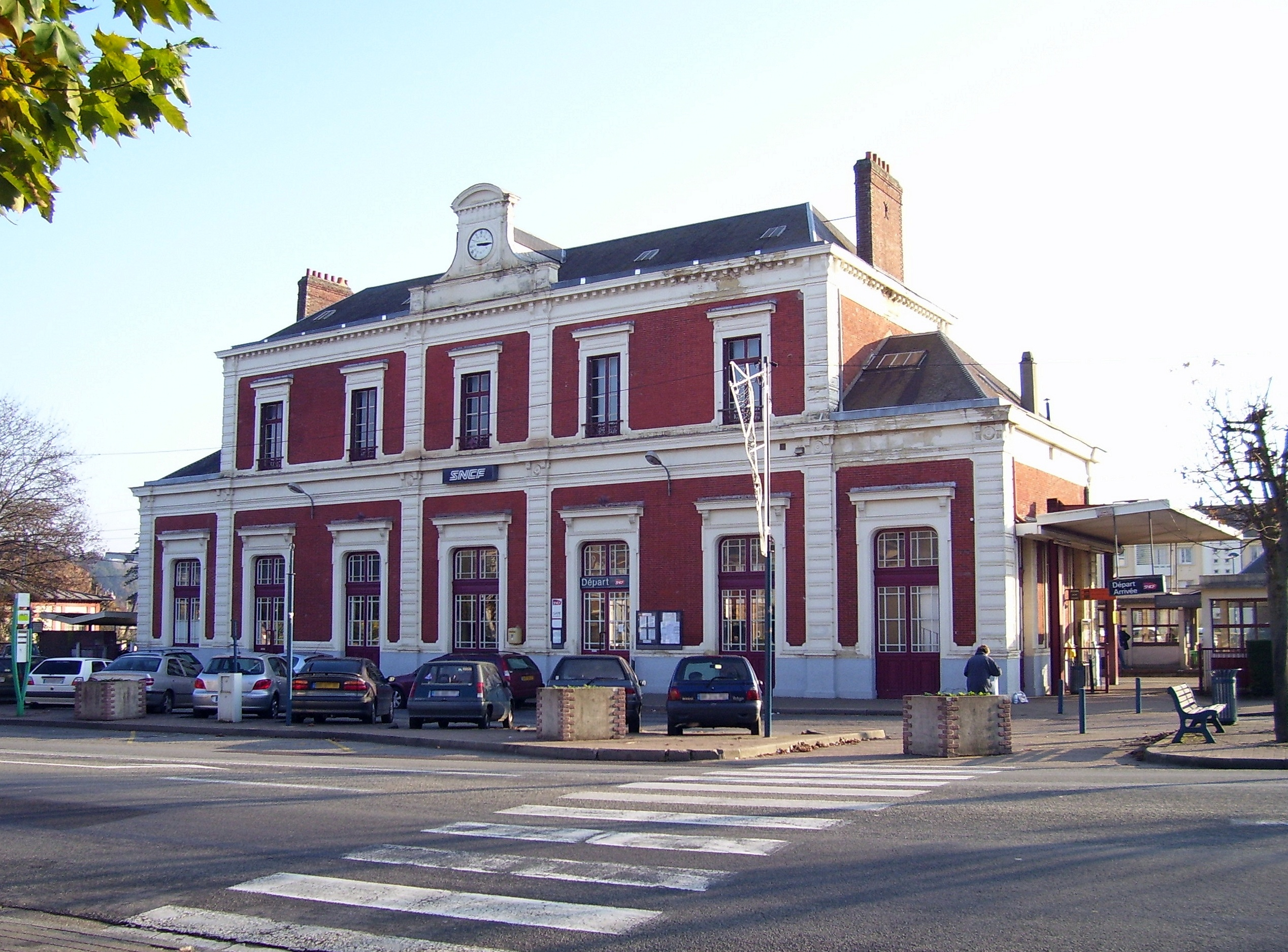

General information
- Location: Boulevard Dubus; 27300 Bernay; Eure, France
- Elevation: 110 m (360 ft)
- Owner: SNCF
- Operator: SNCF
- Line: Mantes-la-Jolie–Cherbourg railway
- Platforms: 2
- Tracks: 2

Other information
- Station code: 87444299

History
- Opened: July 1, 1855

Passengers
- 2018: 447 200

Services
Preceding station	TER Normandie	Following station
Évreux-Normandie towards Paris-Saint-Lazare	Krono+	Lisieux towards Cherbourg
Évreux-Normandie towards Paris-Saint-Lazare	Krono+	Lisieux towards Trouville-Deauville
Lisieux towards Caen	Krono	Elbeuf-Saint-Aubin towards Rouen-RD
Lisieux towards Caen	Proxi	Serquigny towards Rouen-RD
Location

The Gare de Bernay is the train station for the town of Bernay, Eure. It was built by Chemins de Fer de l'Ouest in 1855. It is situated on the Mantes-la-Jolie–Cherbourg railway. The station was, like most stations on the line to Cherbourg, built by the line's first concessionary, the Compagnie du chemin de fer de Cherbourg. The station is a traditional building, with the lower part built in granite with red brick walls, with stone doors and window entourages.

Trains to and from Bernay travel to Caen, Trouville-Deauville, Évreux-Normandie, Paris-Saint-Lazare and Rouen-Rive-Droite.

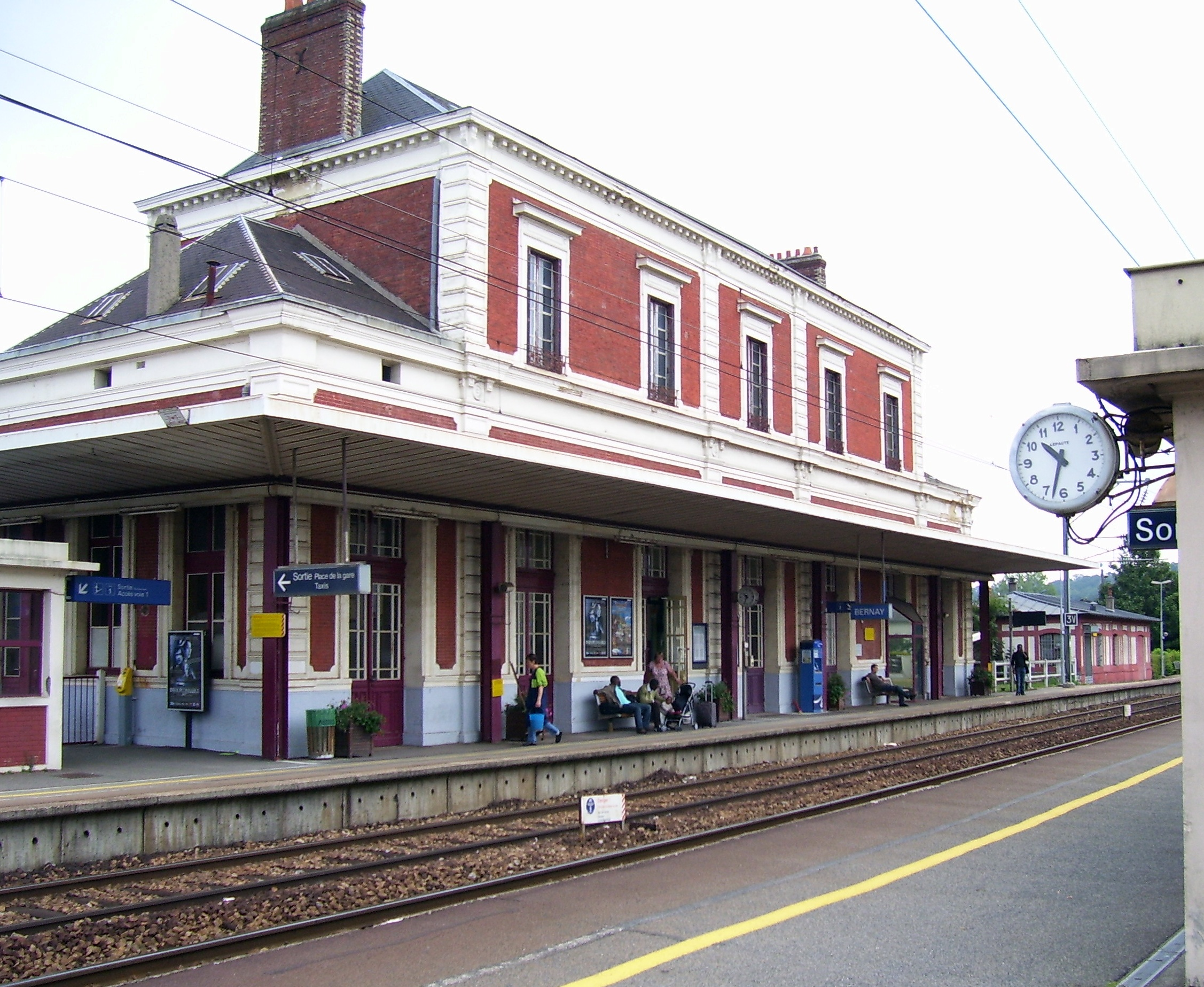
Bernay station
