= Pont-l'Évêque station =

Railway station in Pont-l'Évêque, France

Coordinates: 49°17′14″N 0°11′31″E

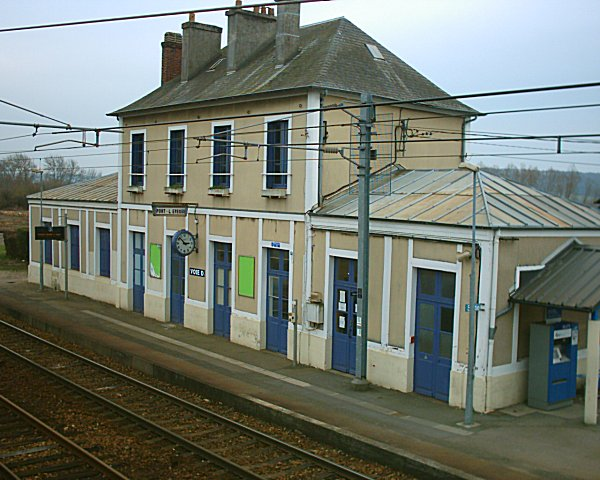
Pont-l'Évêque station

Gare de Pont-l'Évêque is a railway station serving the town Pont-l'Évêque, arrondissement of Lisieux, Calvados department, Normandy, France.

== Services ==
The station is served by regional and local trains to Trouville-Deauville, Lisieux and Paris.

Preceding station	TER Normandie	Following station
Lisieux towards Paris-Saint-Lazare	Krono+	Trouville-Deauville Terminus
Le Grand-Jardin towards Lisieux	Proxi	Trouville-Deauville Terminus
