= Lison =

- Commune
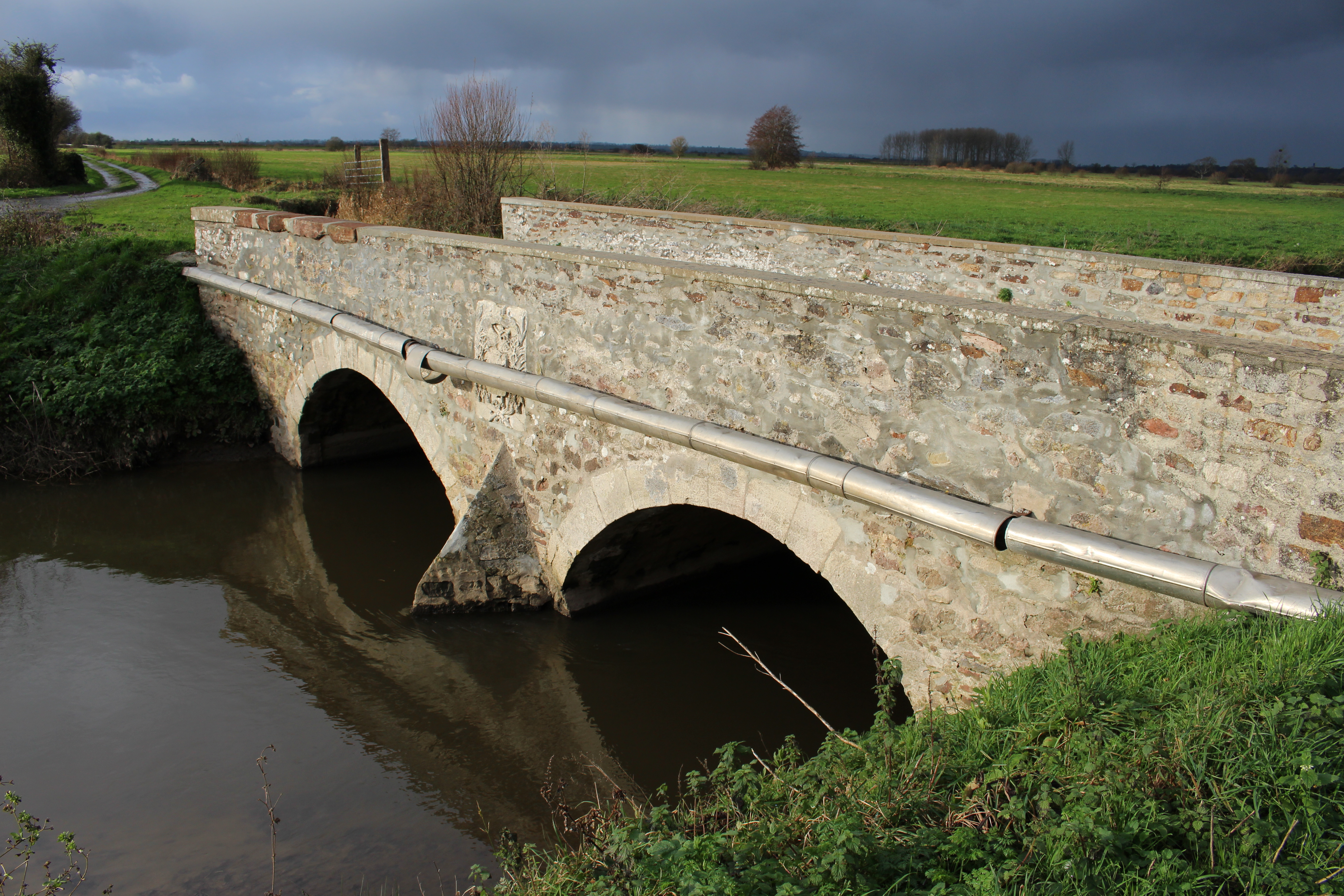
- The bridge over the Elle river
- Location of Lison
- Location within France Location within Normandy
- Coordinates: 49°14′32″N 1°02′12″W
- Country: France
- Region: Normandy
- Department: Calvados
- Arrondissement: Bayeux
- Canton: Trévières
- Intercommunality: CC Isigny-Omaha Intercom

Government
  - Mayor (2024–2026): Cécile Tostain
- Area^{1}: 10.94 km^{2} (4.22 sq mi)
- Elevation: 7 m (23 ft)
- Highest elevation: 62 m (203 ft)
- Lowest elevation: 2 m (6.6 ft)
- Population (2023): 451
  - Density: 41.2/km^{2} (107/sq mi)
- Time zone: UTC+01:00 (CET)
  - Summer (DST): UTC+02:00 (CEST)
- INSEE/Postal code: 14367 /14330
- ^{1} French Land Register data, which excludes lakes, ponds, glaciers > 1 km^{2} (0.386 sq mi or 247 acres) and river estuaries.

Lison (French pronunciation: [lizɔ̃]) is a commune in the Calvados department in the Normandy region in northwestern France.

== Population ==
Historical population
Year	Pop.	±% p.a.
1968	588	—
1975	515	−1.88%
1982	515	+0.00%
1990	479	−0.90%
1999	453	−0.62%
2007	475	+0.59%
2012	467	−0.34%
2017	443	−1.05%
2023	451	+0.30%
Source: INSEE

== Notable people ==
- Fernande Albany (1889 – 1966), actress, born in Lison.

== Today ==
There is a train station, Lison station, which has frequent services to Caen, Saint-Lô and Cherbourg. There are many small supermarkets and restaurants.

== See also ==
- Communes of the Calvados department
