= Vivoin =

- Commune
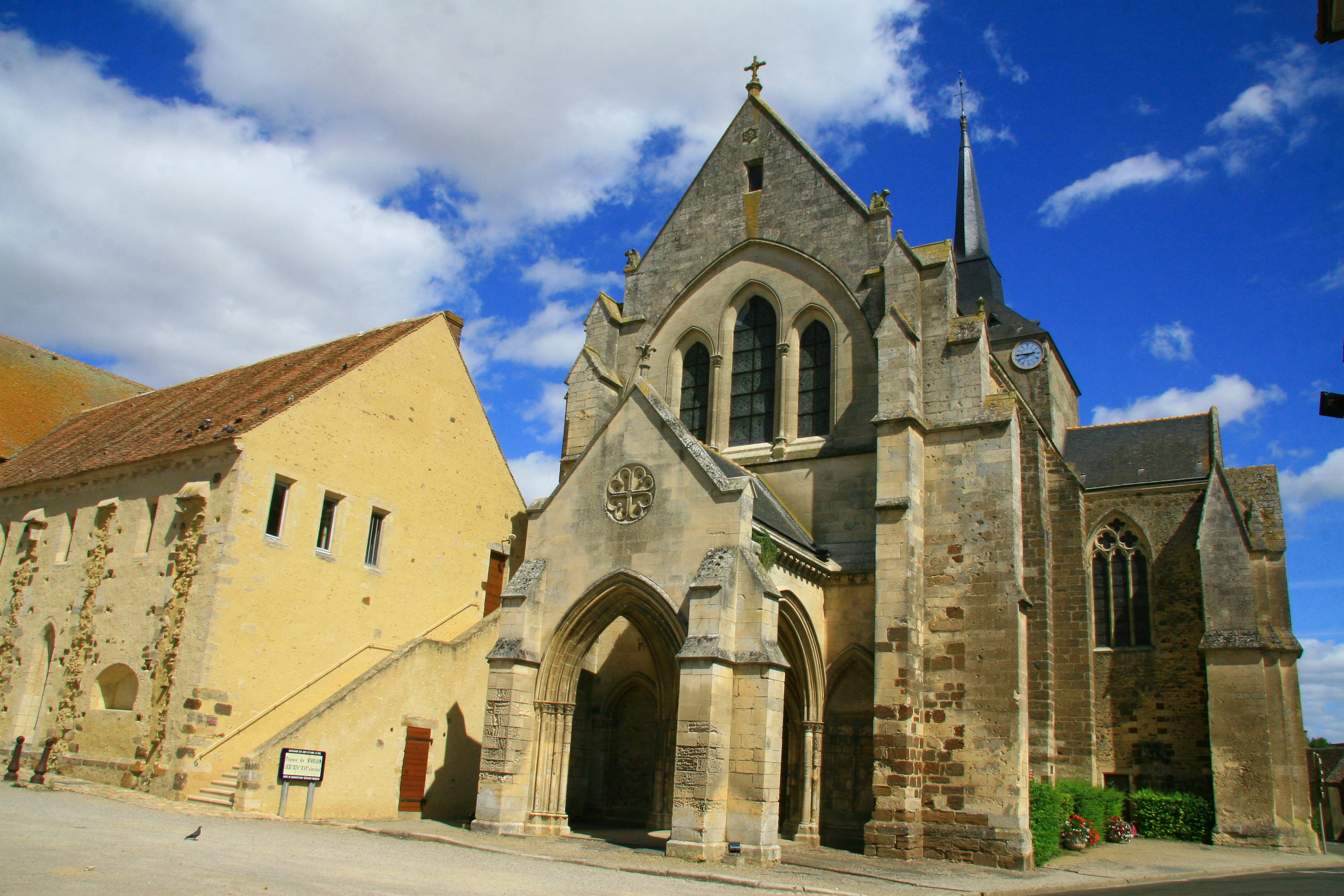
- The church of Saint-Hippolyte

- Coat of arms
- Location of Vivoin
- Location within France Location within Pays de la Loire
- Coordinates: 48°14′03″N 0°09′21″E
- Country: France
- Region: Pays de la Loire
- Department: Sarthe
- Arrondissement: Mamers
- Canton: Sillé-le-Guillaume
- Intercommunality: Haute Sarthe Alpes Mancelles

Government
  - Mayor (2020–2026): Marcel Levesque
- Area^{1}: 18.3 km^{2} (7.1 sq mi)
- Population (2023): 892
  - Density: 48.7/km^{2} (126/sq mi)
- Demonym(s): Vivoinais, Vivoinaise
- Time zone: UTC+01:00 (CET)
  - Summer (DST): UTC+02:00 (CEST)
- INSEE/Postal code: 72380 /72170
- ^{1} French Land Register data, which excludes lakes, ponds, glaciers > 1 km^{2} (0.386 sq mi or 247 acres) and river estuaries.

Vivoin (French pronunciation: [vivwɛ̃]) is a commune in the Sarthe department in the region of Pays de la Loire in north-western France.

== See also ==
- Communes of the Sarthe department
