= Alençon station =

Railway station in France

Coordinates: 48°26′3″N 0°5′56″E

Alençon
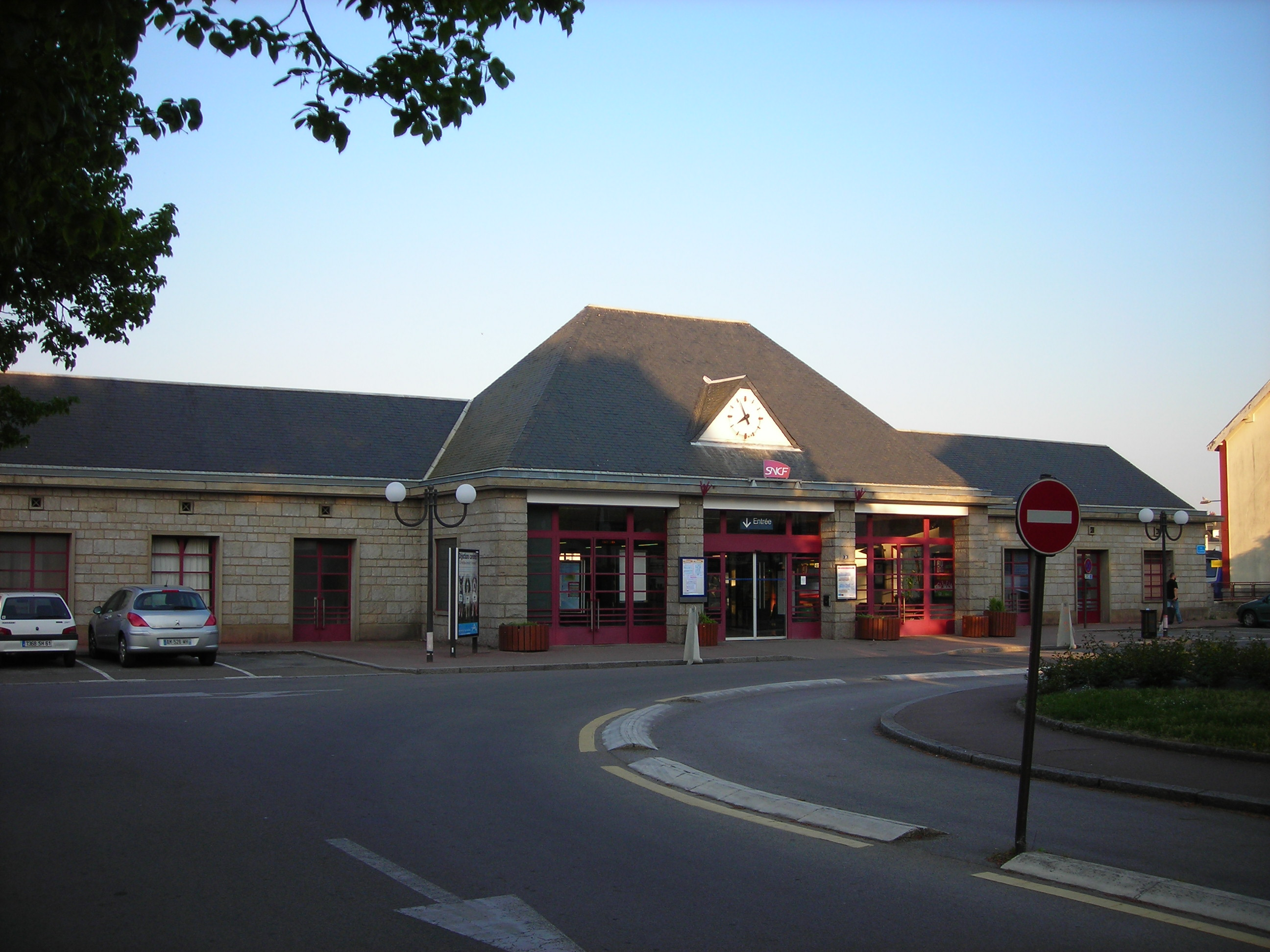
- Gare de Alençon

General information
- Location: Alençon, Orne, Normandy; France
- Line: Le Mans–Mézidon railway

Other information
- Station code: 87444711

History
- Opened: 1856

Services
Preceding station	TER Normandie	Following station
Sées towards Caen	Krono	Vivoin-Beaumont towards Le Mans
Terminus	Proxi	La Hutte-Coulombiers towards Le Mans
Location

Alençon is a railway station in Alençon, Normandy, France. The station opened on 15 March 1856 and is located on the Le Mans–Mézidon railway line. The station is served by TER (local) services operated by SNCF.

== Train services ==
The following services currently call at Alençon:

- local services (TER Normandie) Caen - Alençon - Le Mans

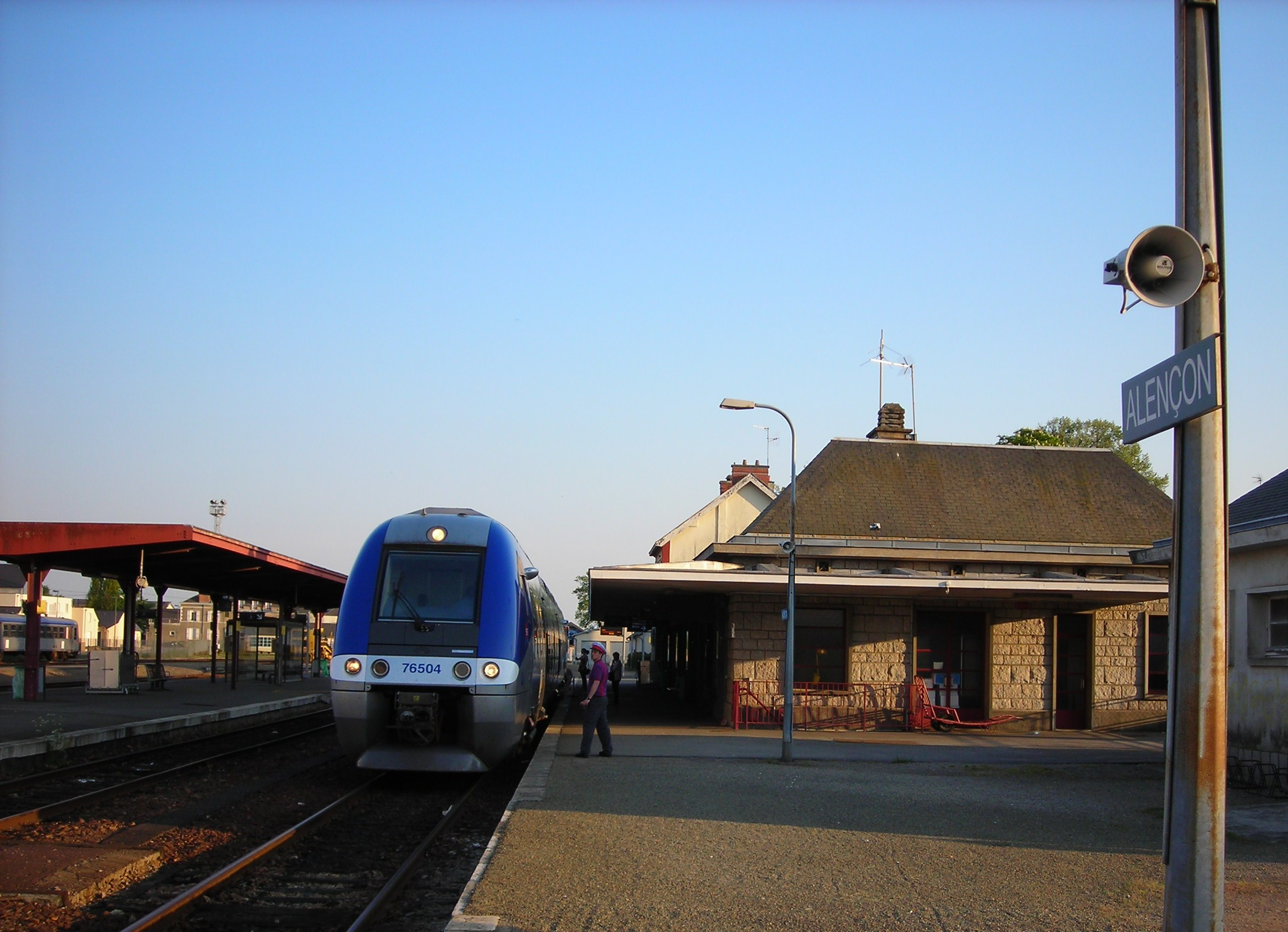
A TER AGC unit at Alençon
