= Lisieux station =

Railway station in Lisieux, France

Coordinates: 49°8′18″N 0°13′52″E

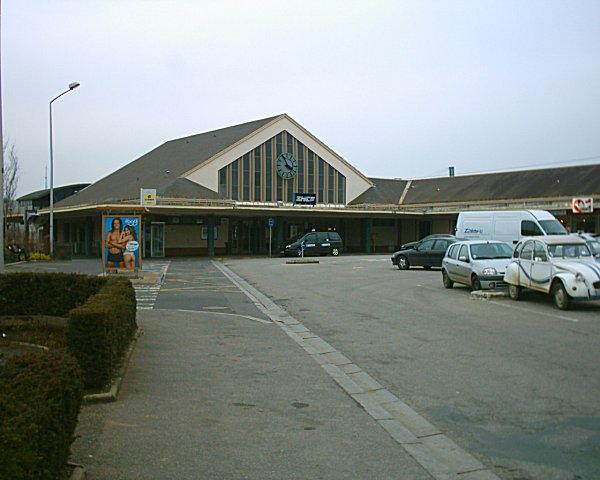
Lisieux' main station's main building

Gare de Lisieux is the main train station for the town of Lisieux, Normandy, France.

It was built by Chemins de Fer de l'Ouest in 1855. The station is built in a Y shape and is situated on the Mantes-la-Jolie–Cherbourg railway main line from Paris to Caen and Cherbourg. The station is also served by trains to Trouville-Deauville. Lisieux has one other station: the Le Grand-Jardin on the line to Trouville-Deauville.

Preceding station	TER Normandie	Following station
Bernay towards Paris-Saint-Lazare	Krono+	Caen towards Cherbourg
Bernay towards Paris-Saint-Lazare	Krono+	Pont-l'Évêque towards Trouville-Deauville
Mézidon towards Caen	Krono	Bernay towards Rouen-RD
Mézidon towards Caen	Citi	Terminus
Terminus	Proxi	Le Grand-Jardin towards Trouville-Deauville
Mézidon towards Caen	Proxi	Bernay towards Rouen-RD
