= Trouville–Deauville station =

Railway station in Deauville, France

Coordinates: 49°21′36″N 0°5′3″E

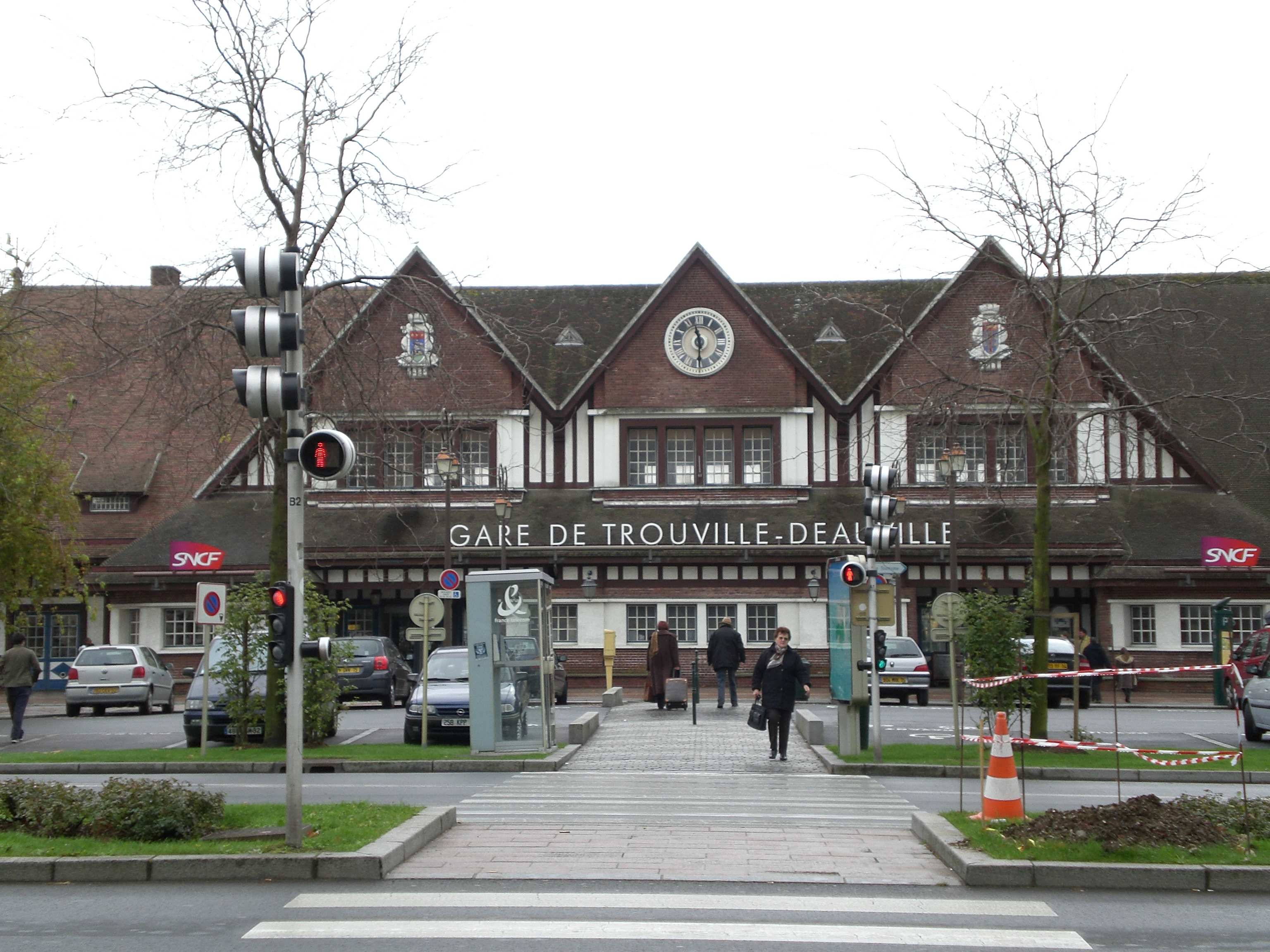
Deauville's station

Trouville-Deauville is the station for the towns of Deauville and Trouville-sur-Mer, Normandy. The station is built in neo-normand architecture and is a terminus for two railway lines, the main line from Paris by Lisieux and the Côte Fleurie branchline to Dives-Cabourg.

The line from Paris and Lisieux opened in 1863. The new station building (in current use) dates from 1931 and was built by Jean Philippot for the Chemin de fer de l'État.

Preceding station	TER Normandie	Following station
Pont-l'Évêque towards Paris-Saint-Lazare	Krono+	Terminus
Pont-l'Évêque towards Lisieux	Proxi	Terminus
Terminus	Seasonal	Blonville-sur-Mer-Benerville towards Dives-Cabourg
