= Argentan station =

Railway station in Argentan, France

Coordinates: 48°44′19″N 0°1′32″W

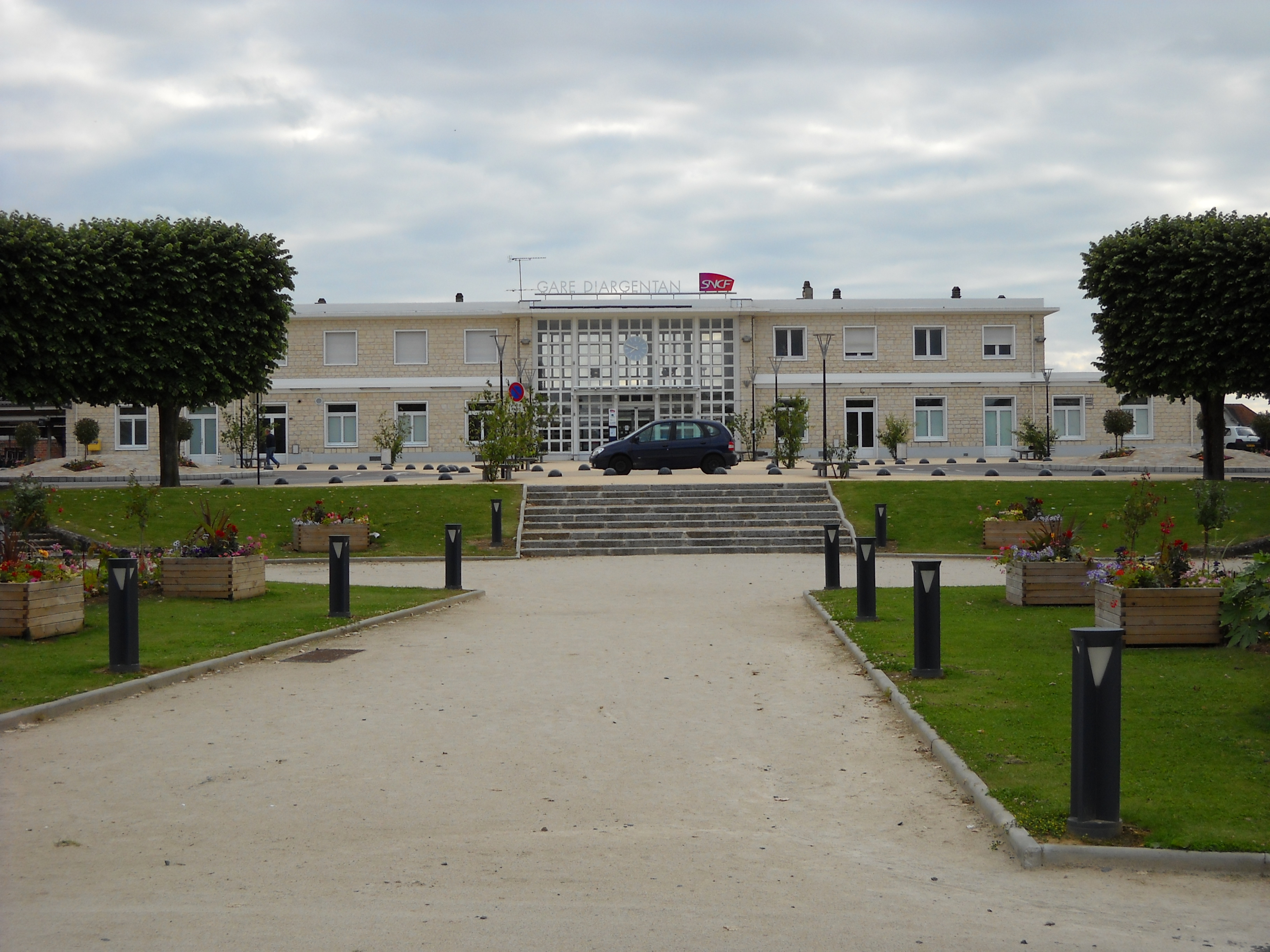
Gare d'Argentan

Gare d'Argentan is a railway station serving the town Argentan, Orne department, northwestern France.

== Services ==
Preceding station	TER Normandie	Following station
Surdon towards Paris-Montparnasse	Krono	Briouze towards Granville
Surdon towards Paris-Montparnasse	Seasonal	Briouze towards Pontorson-Mont-St-Michel
Saint-Pierre-sur-Dives towards Caen	Krono	Surdon towards Le Mans
