= Granville station (Manche) =

Railway station in Granville, France

Coordinates: 48°50′18″N 1°35′15″W

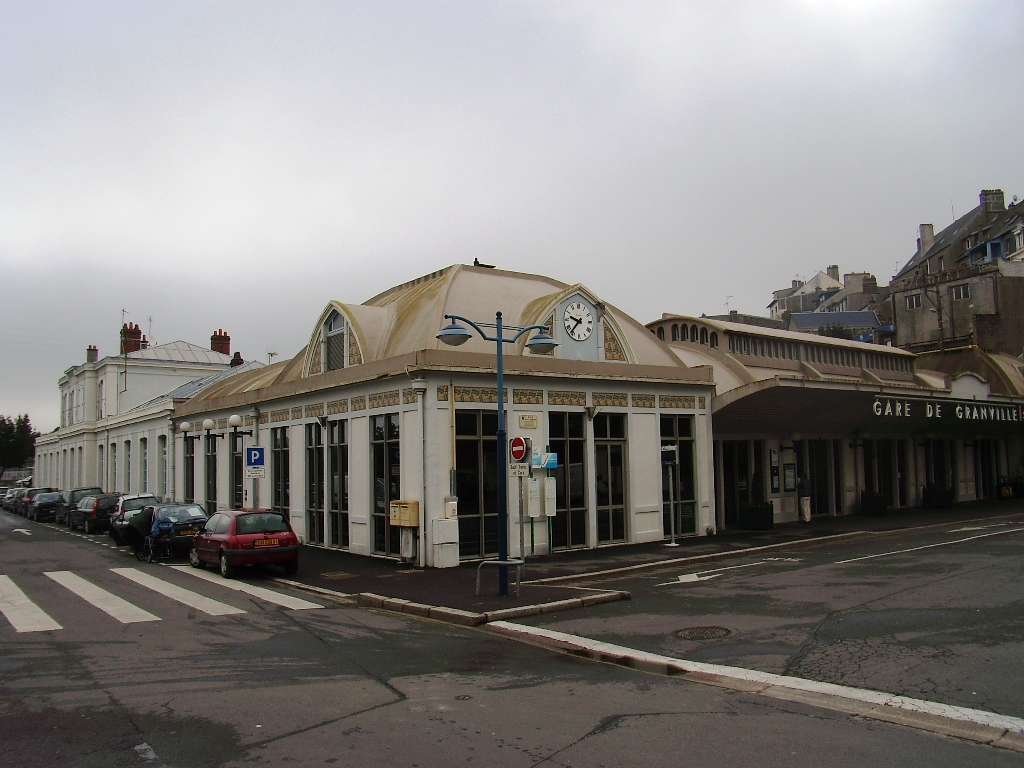
Granville station

Granville station (French: Gare de Granville) is a railway station serving the commune of Granville, in the Manche department of northwestern France.

== Train services ==
Train service (2022) is to/from Paris Gare Montparnasse via Argentan, to/from Rennes and to/from Caen.

| Preceding station | TER Normandie | Following station |
|---|---|---|
| Folligny towards Paris-Montparnasse | Krono | Terminus |
| Coutances towards Caen | Citi | Terminus |
| Terminus | Citi | Folligny towards Rennes |
