= TER Haute-Normandie =

Overview
- Locale: Upper Normandy
- Transit type: TER
- Number of lines: 25
- Website: http://www.sncf.com/en/trains/ter

Operation
- Began operation: 1997
- Operator: SNCF

Technical
- System length: 570 km (350 mi)
- Track gauge: 1,435 mm (4 ft 8 1/2 in) standard gauge
System map
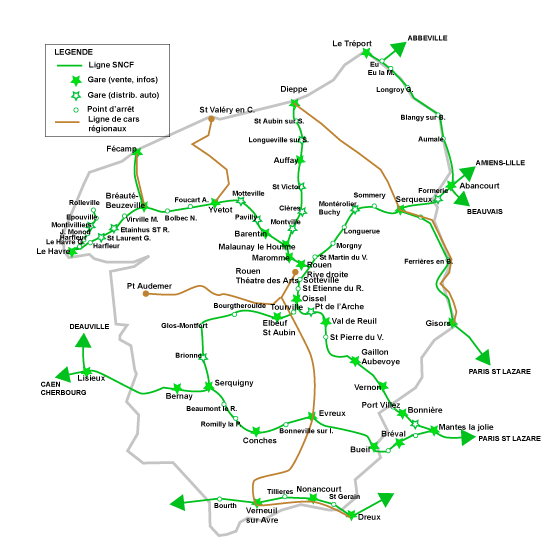

TER Haute Normandie was the regional rail network serving the former region of Upper Normandy in France. In 2016 it was merged into the new TER Normandie.

Trains are operated by the SNCF, services are subject to regulation by the Conseil Régional de Haute Normandie as all TER services are and are promoted using the TER branding. The Conseil Régional has since 2001 received several new multiple units diesel-electric, including single coach, double coach and refurbishment of three car DMUs.

== TER Network ==
=== Rail ===
Line	Route	Frequency	Notes
Caen – Rouen	Caen ... Lisieux ... Serquigny ... Elbeuf-Saint-Aubin – Rouen-Rive-Droite (see TER Basse-Normandie line 8 for details)		
Le Havre – Fécamp	Le Havre ... Bréauté–Beuzeville – Fécamp		
Le Havre – Rolleville	Le Havre ... Montivilliers ... Rolleville		service known as Lézarde Express Régionale
Paris – L'Aigle	Paris-Montparnasse ... Dreux ... Verneuil-sur-Avre ... L'Aigle		
Rouen – Amiens	Rouen-Rive-Droite ... Serqueux ... Abancourt ... Amiens (see TER Picardie line 2 for details)		several trains continue toward Lille, see TER Picardie line 1
Rouen – Dieppe	Rouen-Rive-Droite ... Auffay ... Dieppe		
Rouen – Elbeuf	Rouen-Rive-Droite ... Oissel ... Elbeuf-Saint-Aubin		
Rouen – Le Havre	Rouen-Rive-Droite ... Yvetot ... Bréauté–Beuzeville ... Le Havre		
Rouen – Paris	Rouen ... Oissel ... Vernon ... Mantes-la-Jolie – Paris-Saint-Lazare		
Serquigny – Paris	Serquigny ... Évreux-Normandie ... Mantes-la-Jolie – Paris-Saint-Lazare		
Le Tréport-Mers – Beauvais	Le Tréport-Mers ... Abancourt ... Beauvais (see TER Picardie line 21 for details)		
Gisors – Serqueux	Gisors ... Gournay–Ferrières ... Forges-les-Eaux ... Serqueux		
† Not all trains call at this station

=== Road ===
- Rouen – Louviers – Évreux
- Évreux – Verneuil-sur-Avre
- Yvetot – Saint-Valery-en-Caux
- Dieppe – Serqueux – Gisors
- Rouen – Pont-Audemer

== See also ==
- SNCF
- Transport express régional
- Réseau Ferré de France
- List of SNCF stations in Haute-Normandie
- Upper Normandy
