= Famechon station =

Former French railway station

Famechon
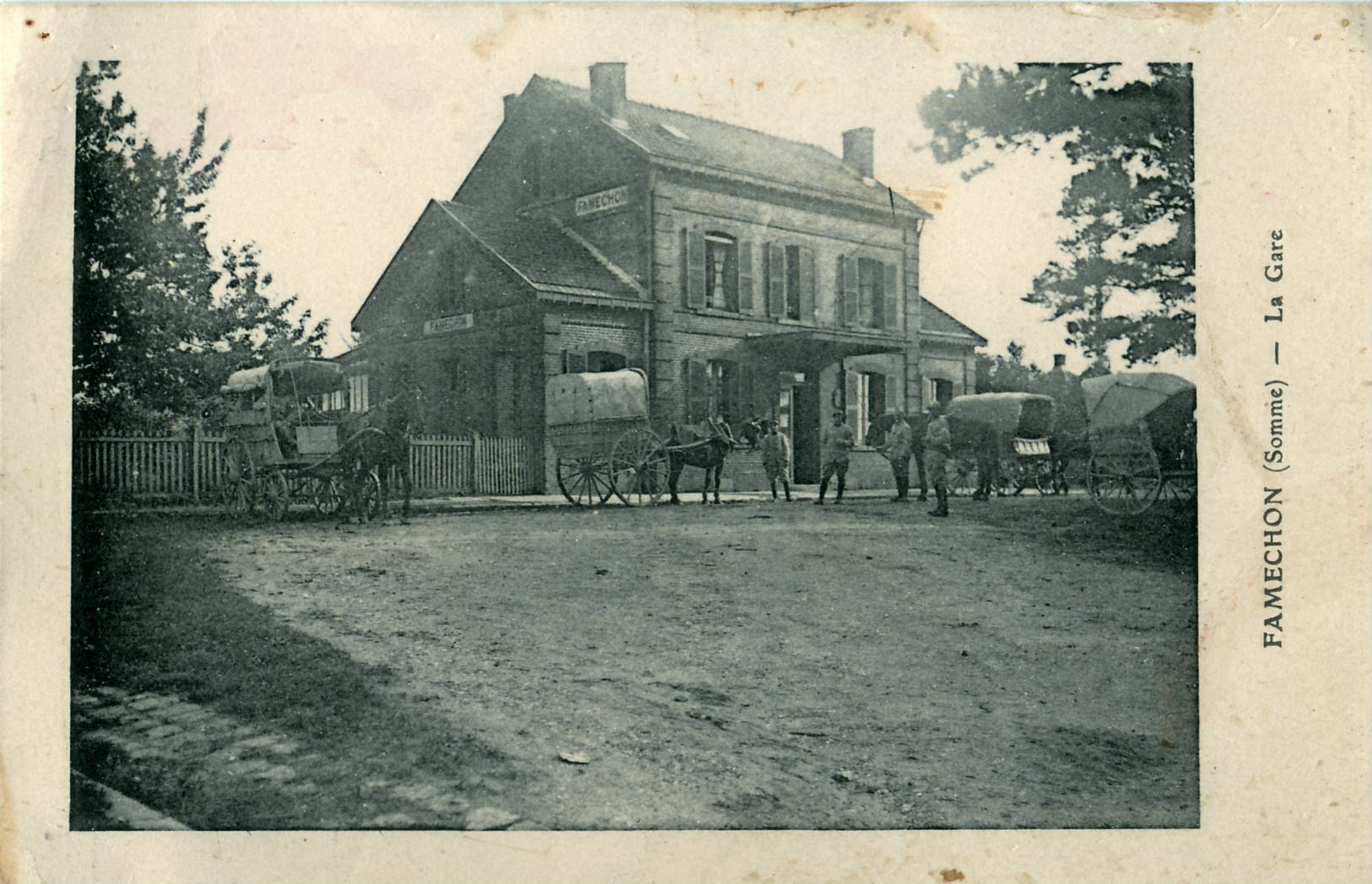
- The station during World War I

General information
- Location: Place de la Gare, Famechon
- Coordinates: 49°46′3″N 2°2′39″E
- Elevation: 129 m (423 ft)
- Owner: RFF/SNCF
- Line: Amiens–Rouen railway

History
- Electrified: 1984
Location

Famechon is a former railway station located in the commune of Famechon in the Somme department, France. The station was served by TER Haute-Normandie and TER Picardie trains between Amiens and Rouen.

The station is one of several of low importance along the 139 km long line; according to the SNCF it averaged 3 passengers per operating day in 2003. As of 2017, it is closed for passenger traffic.

== See also ==
- List of SNCF stations in Hauts-de-France
