= Transport in Le Havre =

Le Havre is a city in the department of Seine-Maritime, situated in the Normandy region of France. The city is located 200 kilometres (120 mi) west of Paris, on the English Channel. The city has a population of 242,474 and is the 13th largest city in France.

== Urban transport ==
=== Bus ===
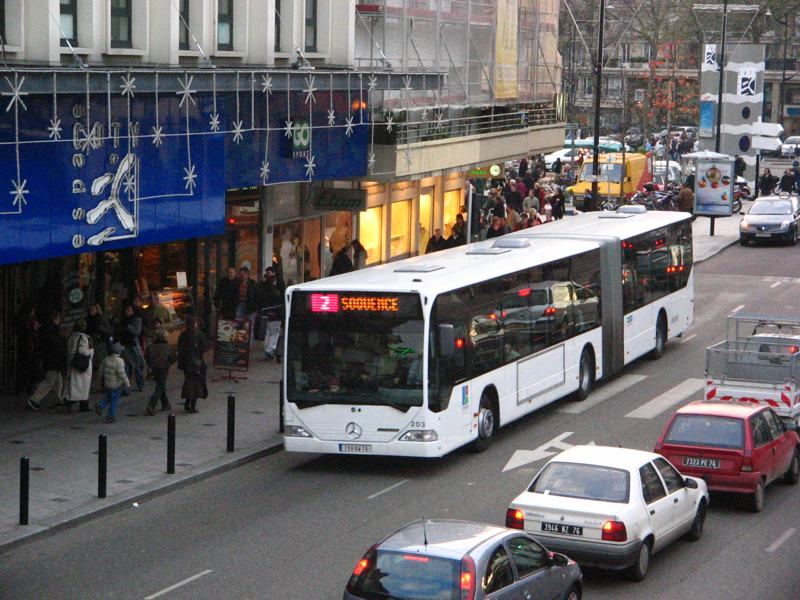
A CPTO Le Havre Bus

Bus services are operated by CTPO, a subsidiary of Veolia Transport.

- 1 (Sainte-Adresse (La Hève) - Montivilliers (Gare))
- 2 (Perrey - Gonfreville-L'Orcher (Parc de l'estuaire))
- 3 (Grand Hameau - Graville)
- 4 (Jenner - Perrey)
- 5 (Sainte-Adresse (St André) - Graville)
- 6 (Grand Hameau - Gares)
- 7 (Notre Dame - Gonfreville-L'Orcher (Parc de l'estuaire))
- 8 (Gares - Soquence)
- 9 (Gares - Montivilliers (Gare))
- 10 (Montivlliers (Cours Ste Croix) - Gonfreville-L'Orcher (Parc de l'estuaire))
- 11 (Octeville (Centre) - G. Brassens)
- 12 (J. Monod Nord - Gainneville)
- 13 (Octeville - St Martin du Manoir)
- 14 (Cité Pelletier - Pissotière à Madame)
- 15 (Rouelles - Emfrayette)
- 16 (F. Liszt - M. Bellonte)

=== Tram ===
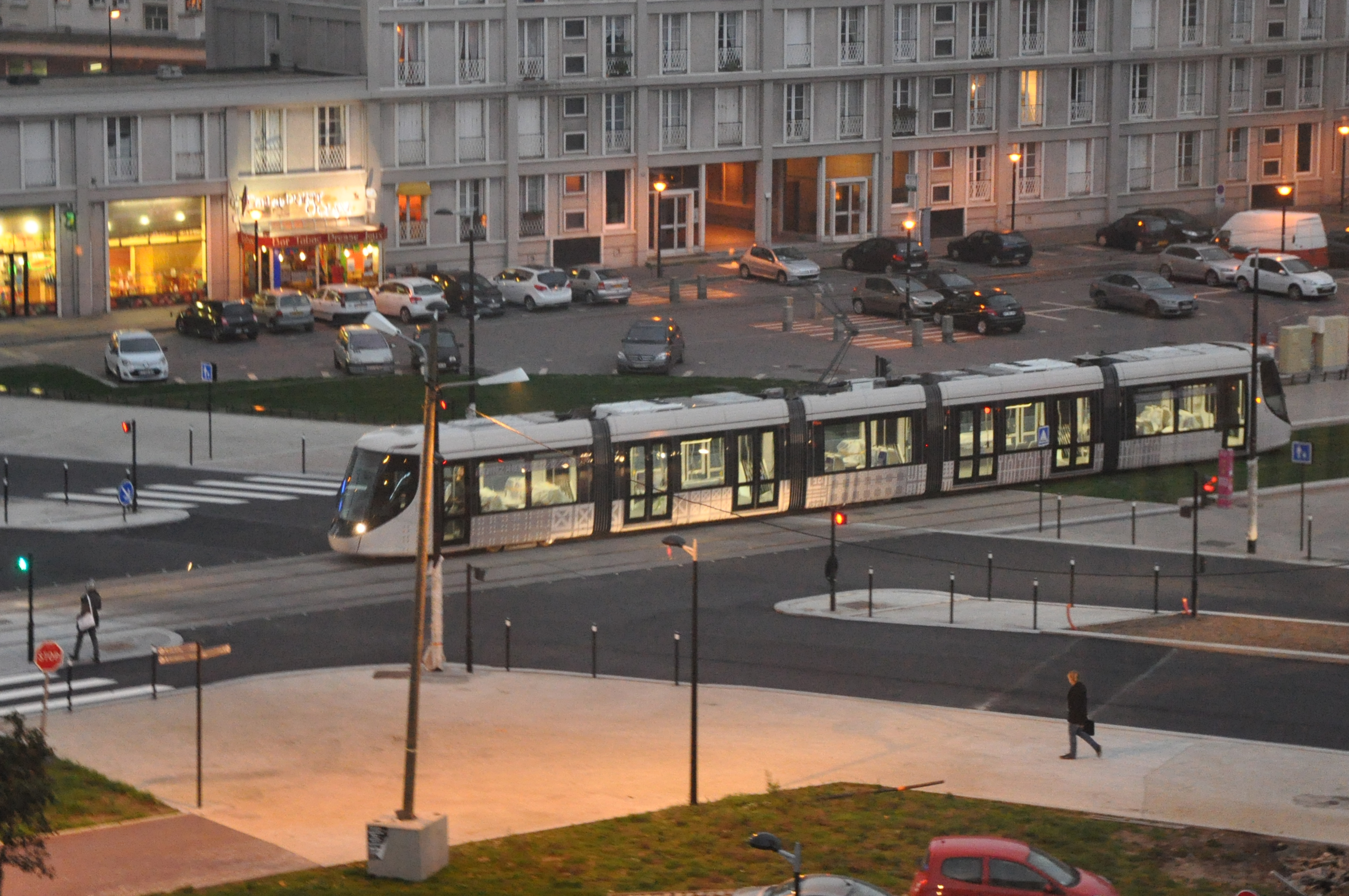
A Le Havre tram

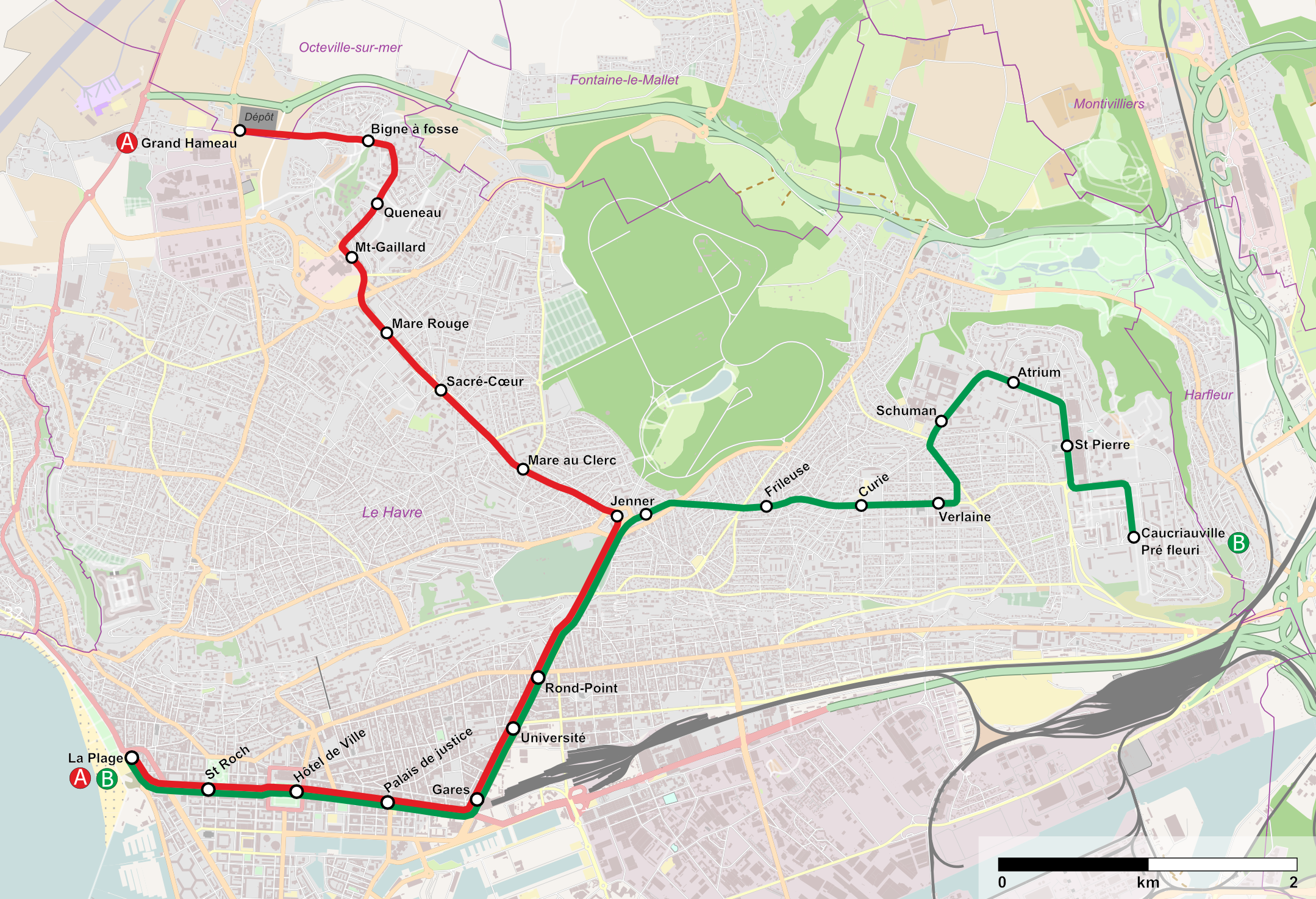
Tram network of Le Havre

Le Havre has 2 tram routes, serving large parts of the city. Le Havre regained trams on 12 December 2012, after the network was closed in 1957. There is a network of 13 kilometres (8.1 mi), using Citadis 302 trams. Both tram routes serve Le Havre railway station.

- A (La Plage - Hotel de Ville - Gare - Université - Mare Rouge - Mont-Gaillard)
- B (La Plage - Hotel de Ville - Gare - Université - Atrium - Caucriauville)

== Longer distance transport ==
=== Car ===
Numerous roads link to Le Havre with the main access roads being the A13 Motorway) from Paris, linking to the A131 autoroute and A29 Motorway from Amiens.

=== Rail ===
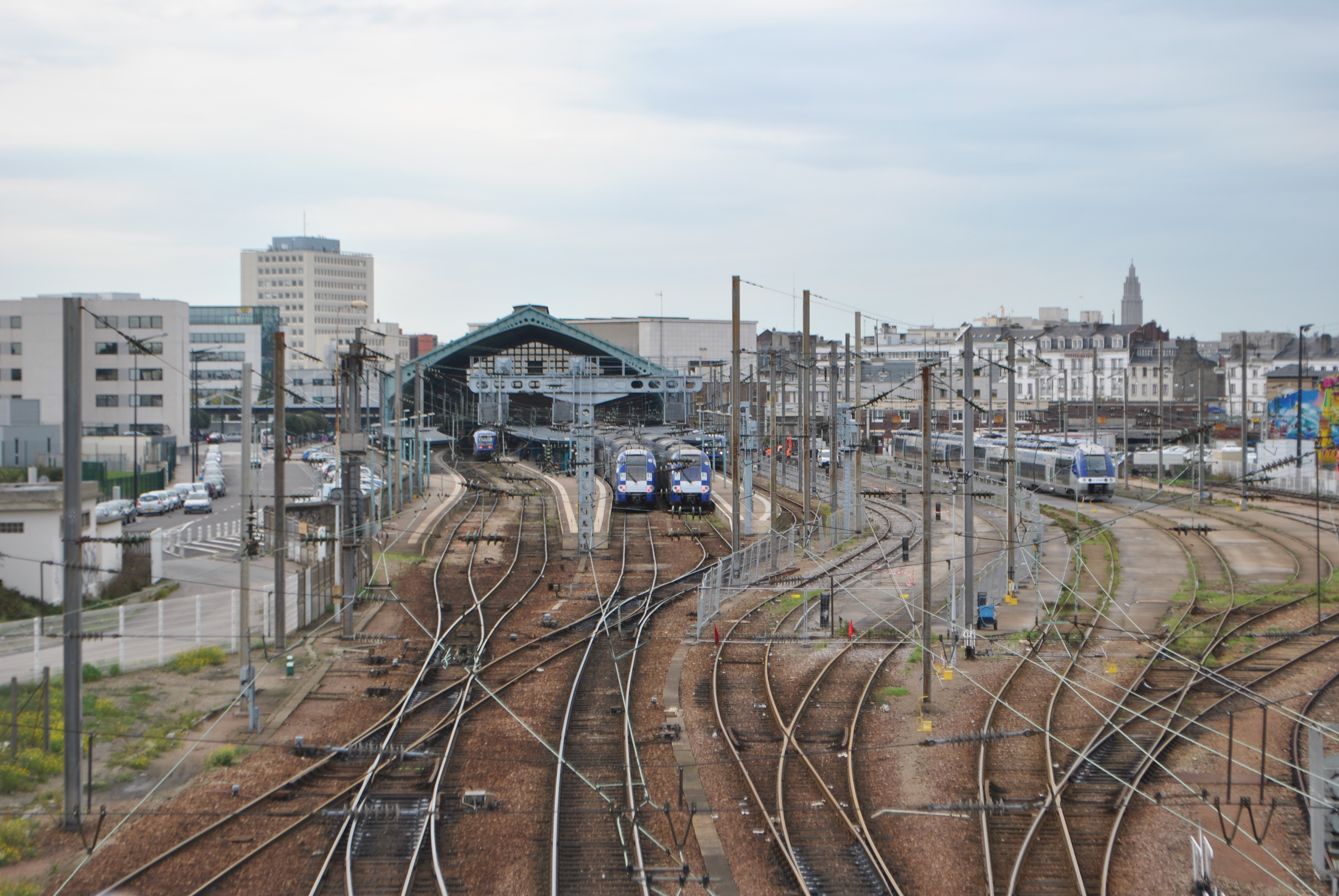
Le Havre station

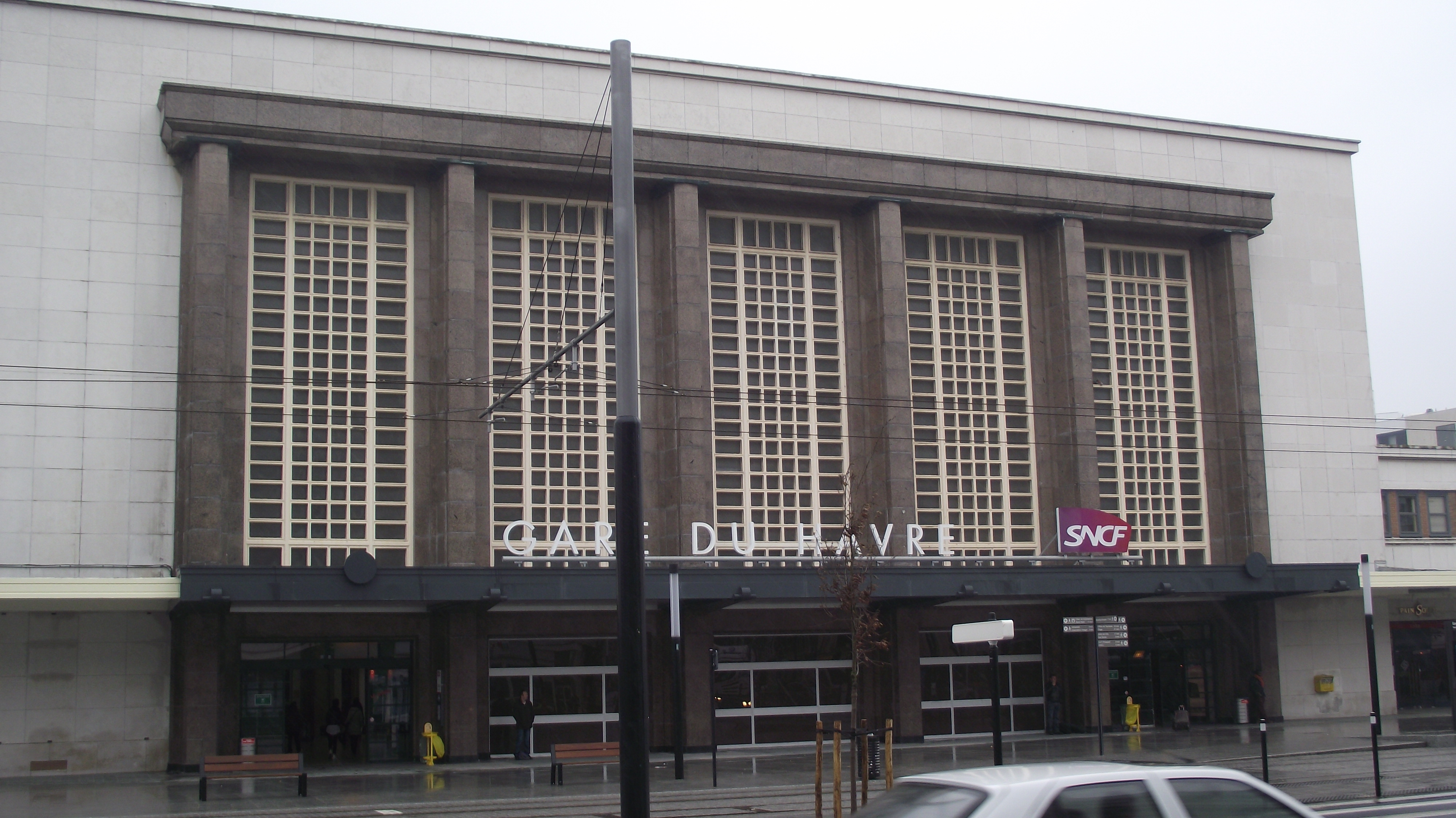
Le Havre station entrance (right)

Le Havre railway station is the main station, located in the city centre. The station is served by trains to major cities such as Paris, Rouen, Lyon, Marseille and local services to Fecamp and Rolleville.

Train services are operated by SNCF.

=== Port ===
The Port of Le Havre is the largest in France, based on number of containers.

Brittany Ferries operate a ferry service from Portsmouth, England. It is to ceaee in September 2026.

=== Air ===
Le Havre – Octeville Airport is located 5 kilometres (3.1 mi) north of the city, in Octeville-sur-Mer. Charles de Gaulle Airport in Paris is 220 kilometres (140 mi) away, which offers more international flights. Paris-Charles de Gaulle Airport can be reached by public transport from Le Havre, with a change of train in Paris.
