= Le Havre-Graville station =

Railway station in Le Havre, France

Le Havre-Graville
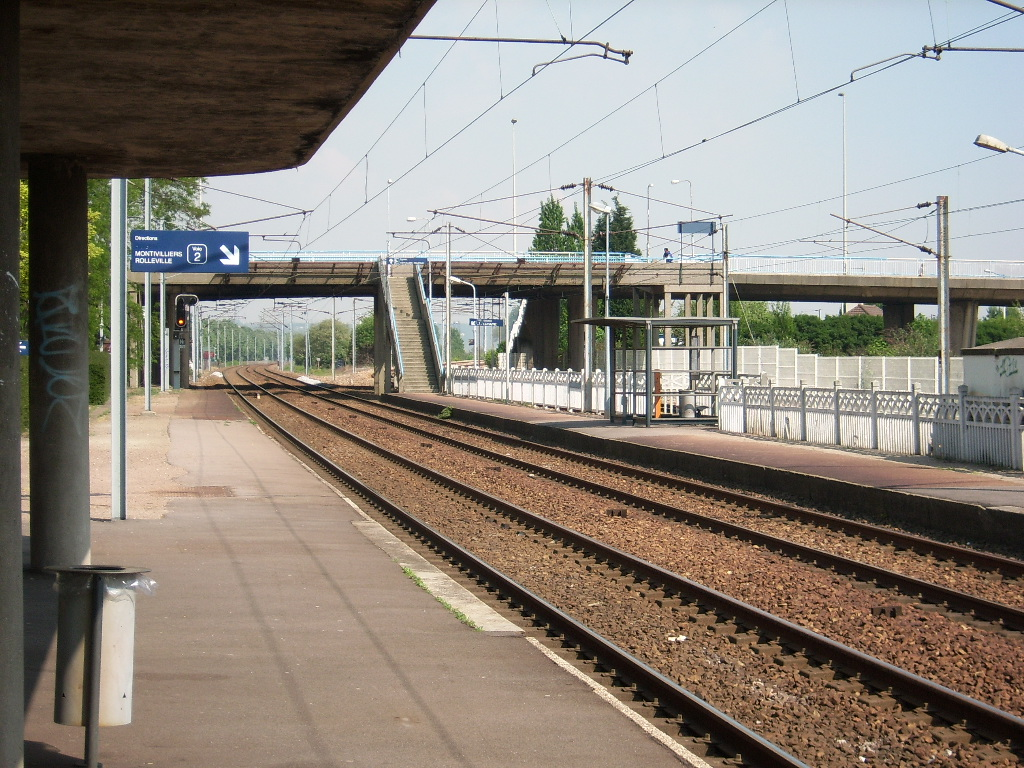
- View towards Paris

General information
- Location: Le Havre, Normandy; France
- Coordinates: 49°29′59″N 0°9′39″E
- Lines: Paris–Le Havre railway, Lézarde Express Régionale
- Tracks: 2

Other information
- Station code: 87413203

History
- Opened: 1847
- Closed: 2024
Location

Le Havre-Graville is a former station in the Graville-Sainte-Honorine quarter of the city of Le Havre. It is situated on the Paris–Le Havre railway and the Lézarde Express Régionale line to Rolleville. It was served by local trains from Le Havre to Montivilliers and Rolleville until 2024.
