= Saint-Denis–Dieppe railway =

Railway in France

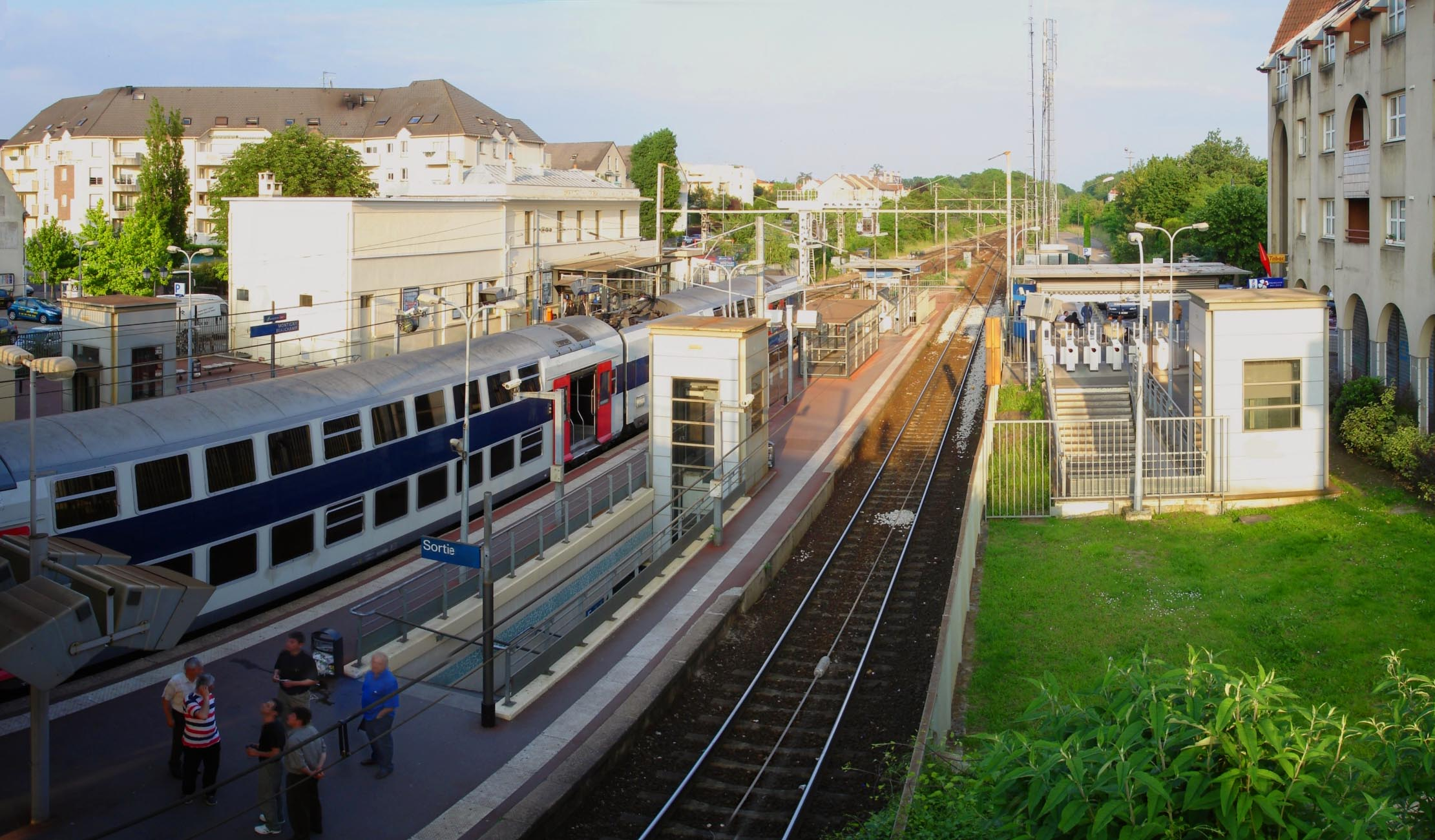
- Montigny station in 2007

Overview
- Status: Operational
- Owner: RFF
- Locale: France (Île-de-France, Hauts-de-France, Normandy)
- Termini: Saint-Denis station; Dieppe station

Service
- System: SNCF
- Operator(s): SNCF

History
- Opened: 1846-1873

Technical
- Line length: 161 km (100 mi)
- Number of tracks: Double track (Saint-Denis–Serqueux)
- Track gauge: 1,435 mm (4 ft 8 1/2 in) standard gauge
- Electrification: 25 kV 50 Hz (Saint-Denis–Gisors)

The railway from Saint-Denis to Dieppe is a French 161-kilometre long railway line, that connected Paris to Dieppe on the English Channel coast. It was opened in several stages between 1846 and 1873. The part between Gisors and Serqueux was closed from 2009 to 2013, and the part between Serqueux and Arques-la-Bataille has been demolished.

== Route ==
The Saint-Denis–Dieppe railway begins in the northern suburbs of Paris, near the Saint-Denis station, where it branches off the railway from Paris to Lille. It runs in generally northwestern direction, passing through Pontoise, Gisors, Gournay-en-Bray and Serqueux, where it crosses the Amiens–Rouen railway. The now demolished section beyond Serqueux passed through Neufchâtel-en-Bray, and followed the river Béthune downstream until it reached its terminus Dieppe station.

=== Main stations ===
The main stations on the Saint-Denis–Dieppe railway are:

- Saint-Denis station
- Épinay–Villetaneuse station
- Ermont–Eaubonne station
- Pontoise station
- Gisors station
- Serqueux station
- Dieppe station

== Services ==
The Saint-Denis–Dieppe railway is used by the following passenger services:

- RER rapid transit between Ermont-Eaubonne and Pontoise
- Transilien regional services from Paris to Persan-Beaumont, Pontoise, Luzarches and Gisors-Embranchement
- TER Normandie regional services between Gisors-Embranchement and Serqueux.
