= Villennes-sur-Seine station =

Railway station in Villennes-sur-Seine, France

Villennes-sur-Seine
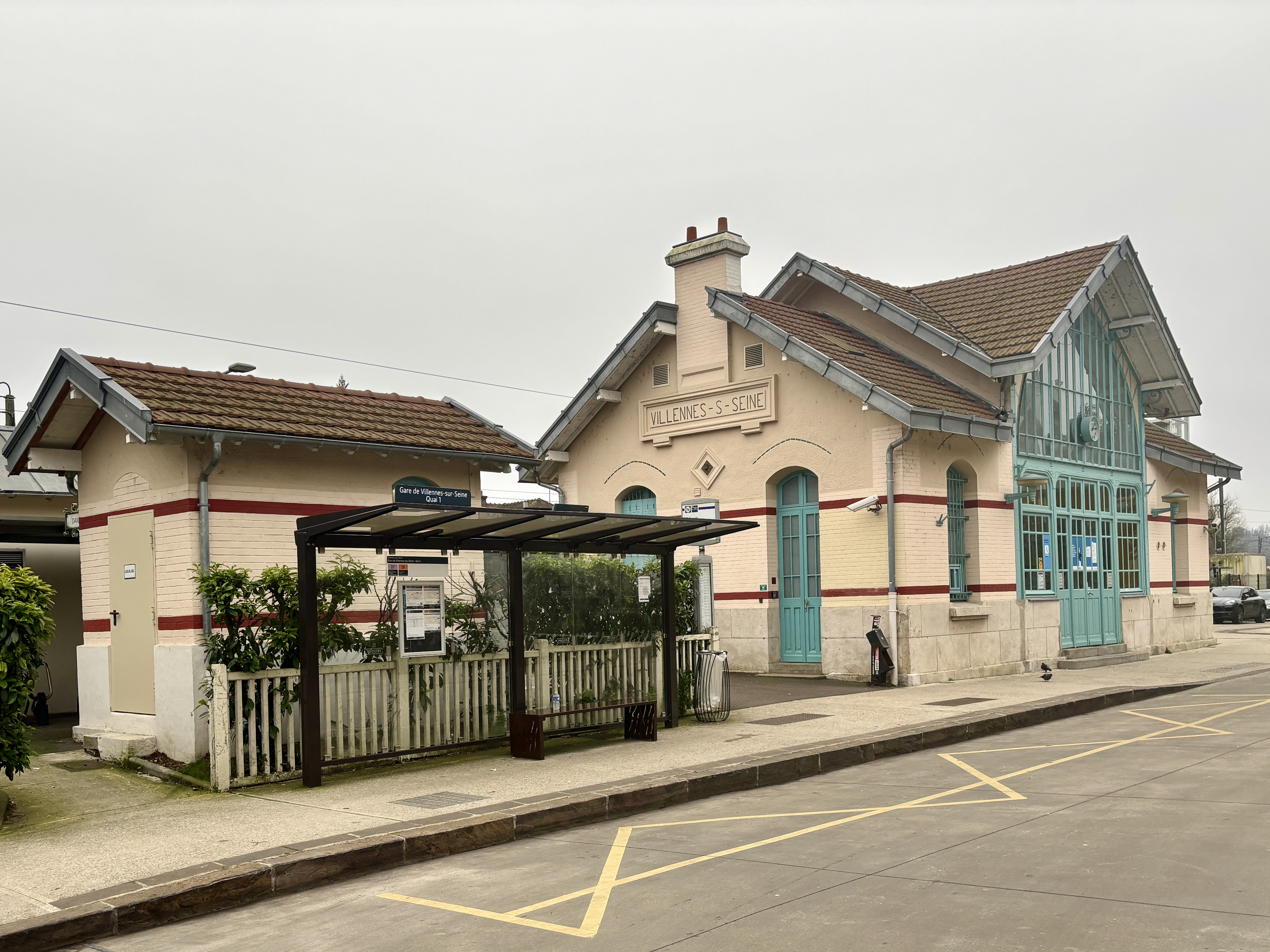
- The passenger building in 2024

General information
- Location: 70, place de la Libération; 78670 Villennes-sur-Seine; France
- Coordinates: 48°56′22″N 1°59′58″E
- Owner: SNCF
- Operator: SNCF
- Platforms: 2 platforms
- Tracks: 2

Construction
- Accessible: Yes, by prior reservation

Other information
- Station code: 87386649
- Fare zone: 5

History
- Opened: 1843

Passengers
- 2023: 2,811,279

Services
Preceding station	Transilien	Following station
Poissy towards Paris-St.-Lazare	Line J	Vernouillet–Verneuil towards Ermont–Eaubonne, Gisors, Mantes-la-Jolie or Vernon
Location

Villennes-sur-Seine is a French rail station of the Paris-Saint-Lazare–Le Havre line located in Villennes-sur-Seine, in the departement of the Yvelines, in Île-de-France.

The station is operated by the SNCF (Société nationale des chemins de fer français) and served by trains of the Transilien Line J.

== Location ==
The station is established at an altitude of 24 meters, and located at kilometric point (PK) 29.703 of Paris–Le Havre line, between the stations Vernouillet–Verneuil and Poissy.

== History ==
A first building is built in 1844.

A stop, created in 1880, gave way to a station inaugurated in May 1911, whose passenger building was designed by the architect Alexandre Barret (1863–1921) based on plans drawn up by Antoine Raguenet for the Clamart station building edified in 1904 and demolished in 1972.

== Attendance ==
From 2015 to 2023, according to SNCF estimates, the annual passenger traffic at the station amounted to the figures indicated in the table below:

Year	2015	2016	2017	2018	2019	2020	2021	2022	2023
Passengers	726,073	682,829	639,197	587,565	541,158	285,276	781,301	975,080	1,037,553

== Service ==
=== Train service ===
The station is served by trains of the Transilien Line J.

=== Connections ===
The station is served by the following bus lines:

- Poissy - Les Mureaux: 6527 6528
- Noctilien: N151

== Heritage ==
In 2019, the passenger building received the label "Patrimoine d'intérêt régional" which aims to promote and encourage the protection of elements not subject to formal listing. Built in 1911 using the plans of the former Clamart train station, which was demolished in 1972. This building is structured around a main hall lit on both sides by a glass roof under a gabled roof (with a pointed arch ceiling) perpendicular to the wings arranged on either side. Period costume festivities had taken place to celebrate the 100th anniversary of its construction.

== Gallery ==
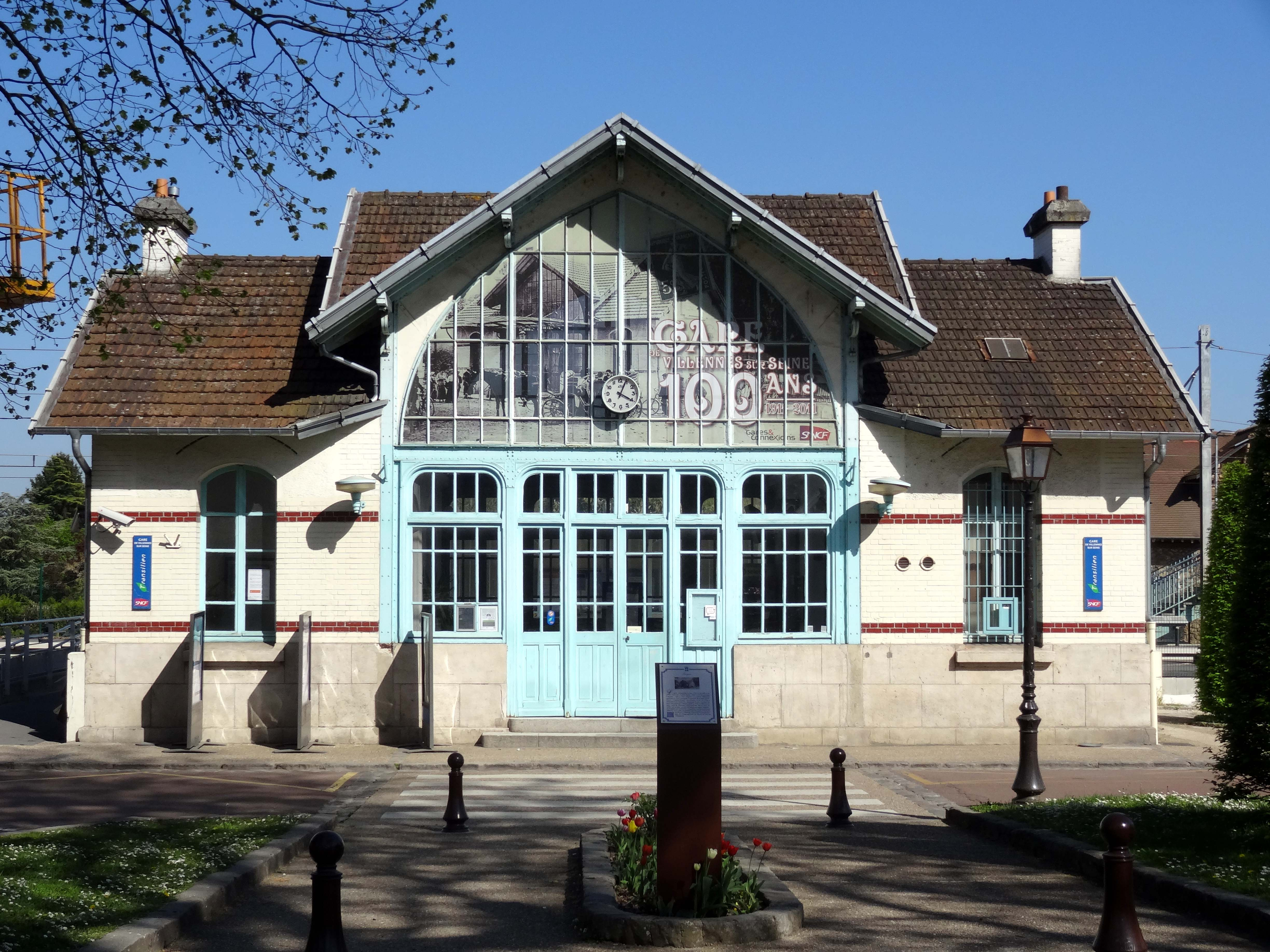

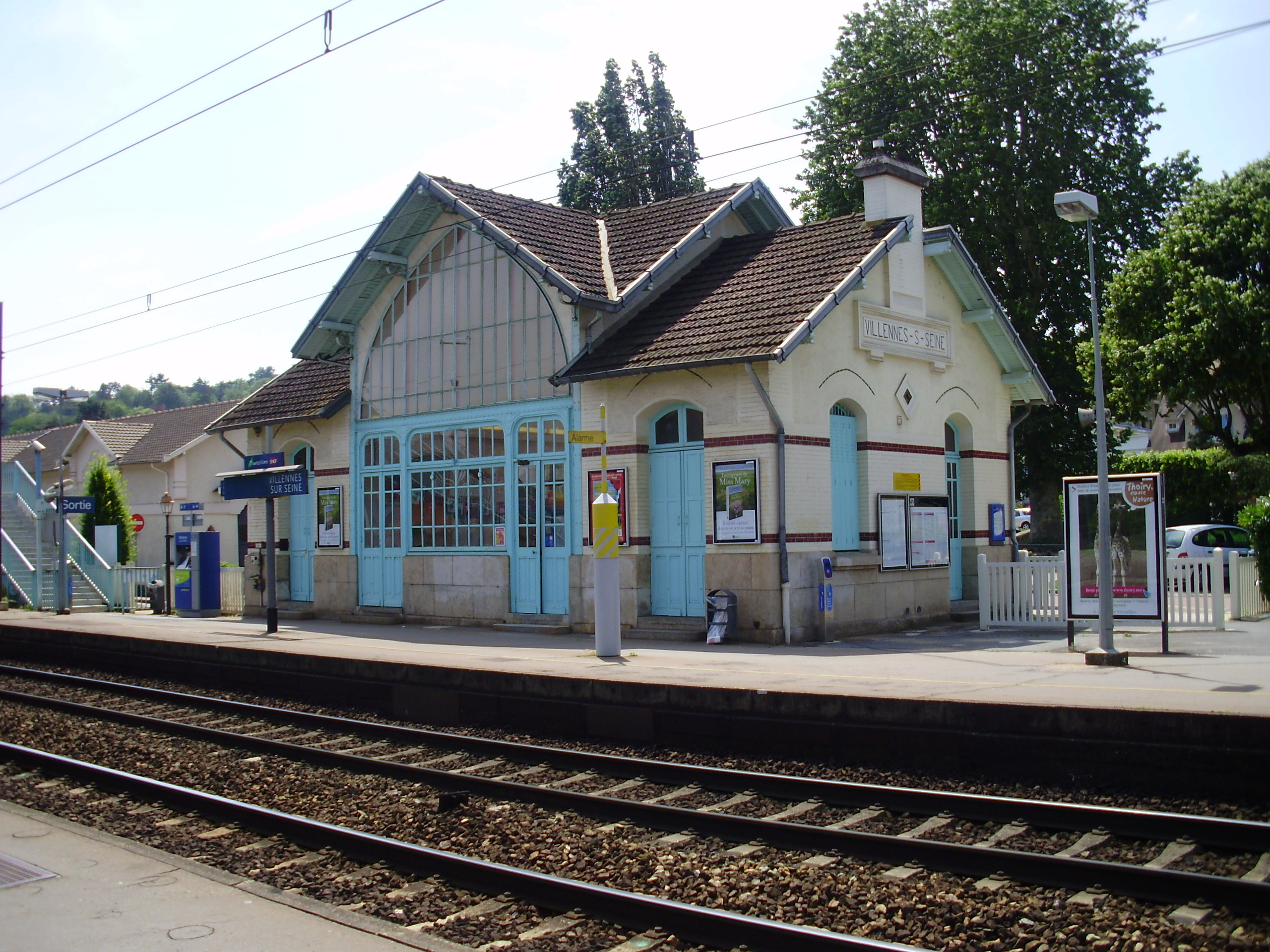

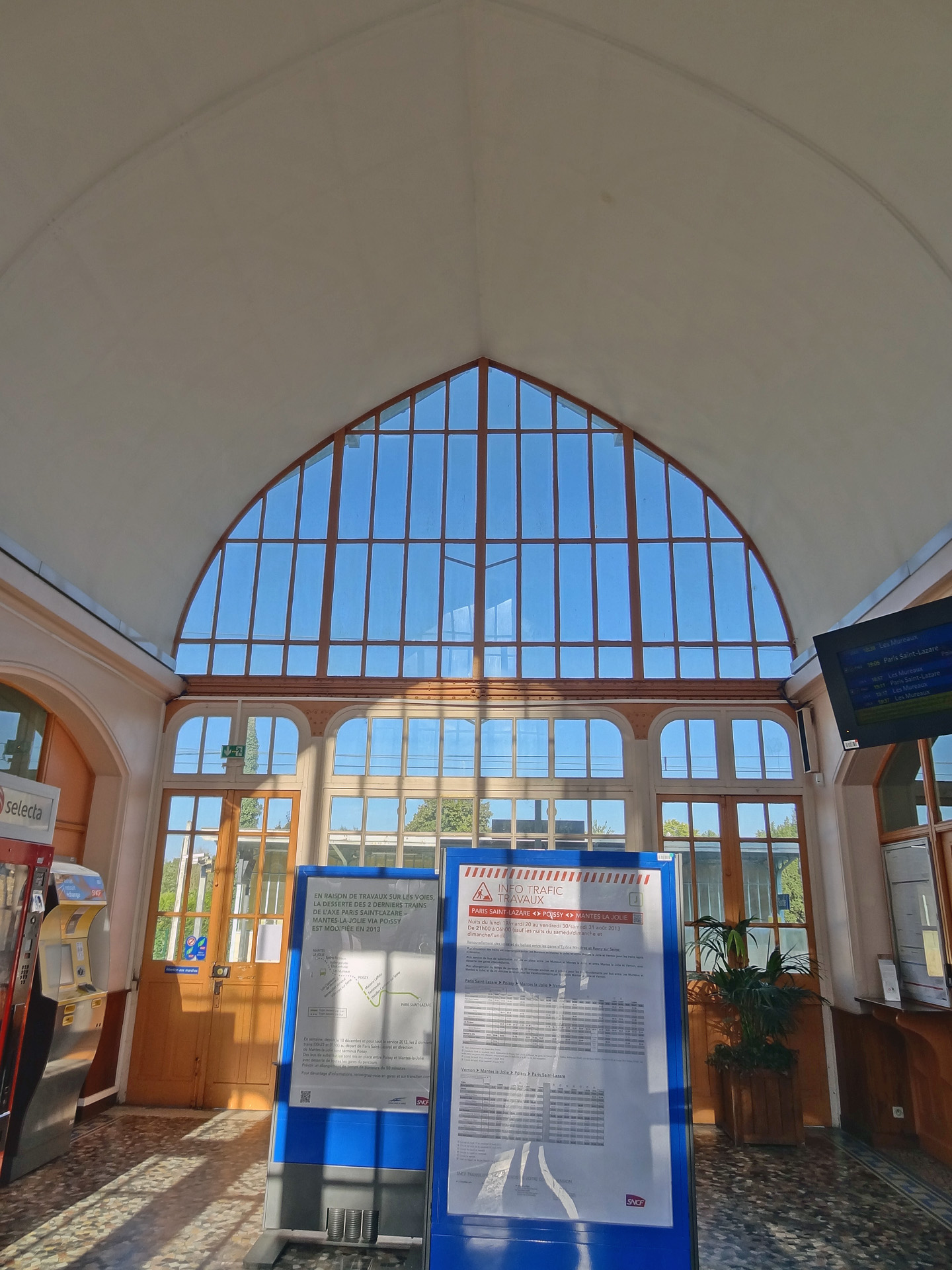

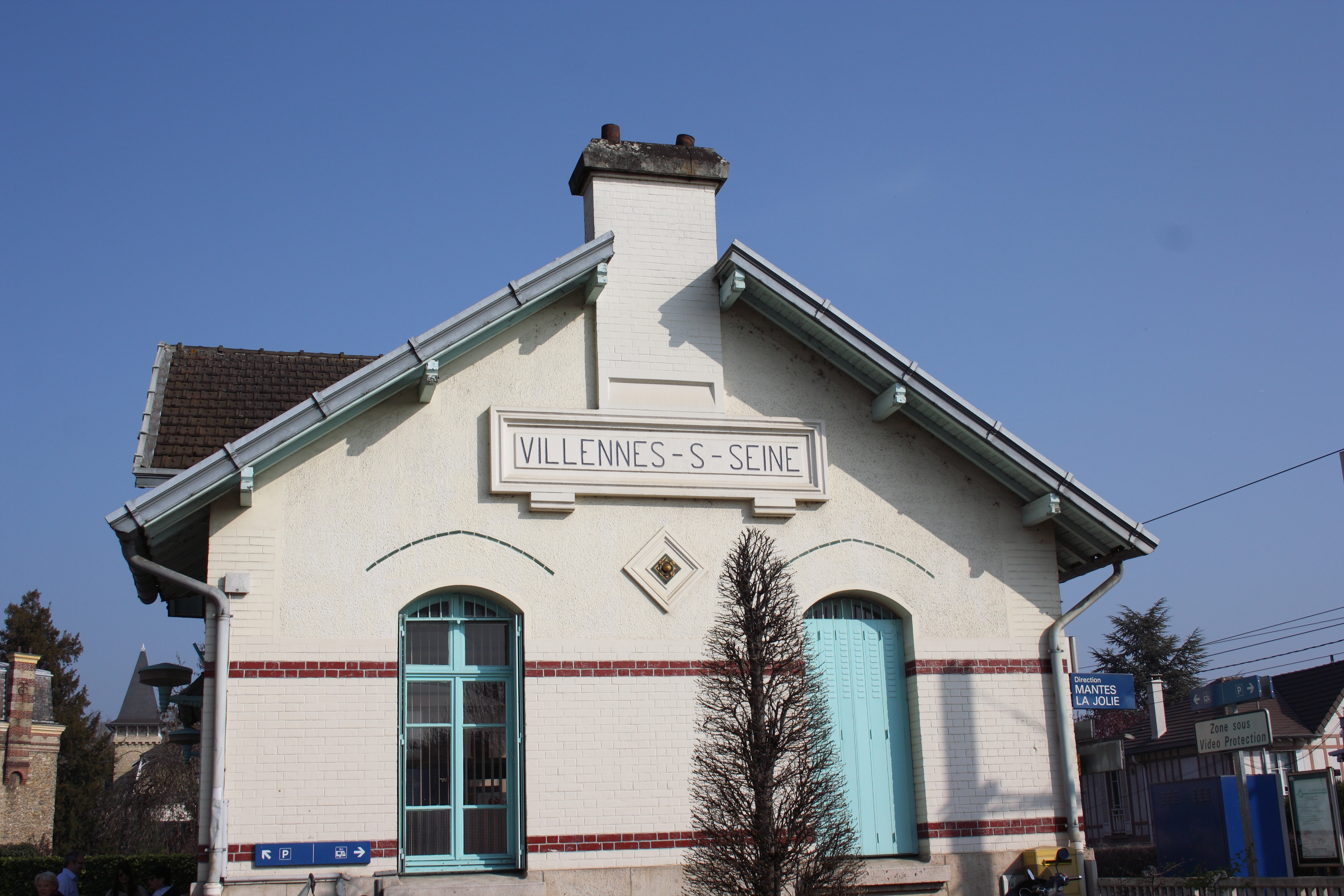

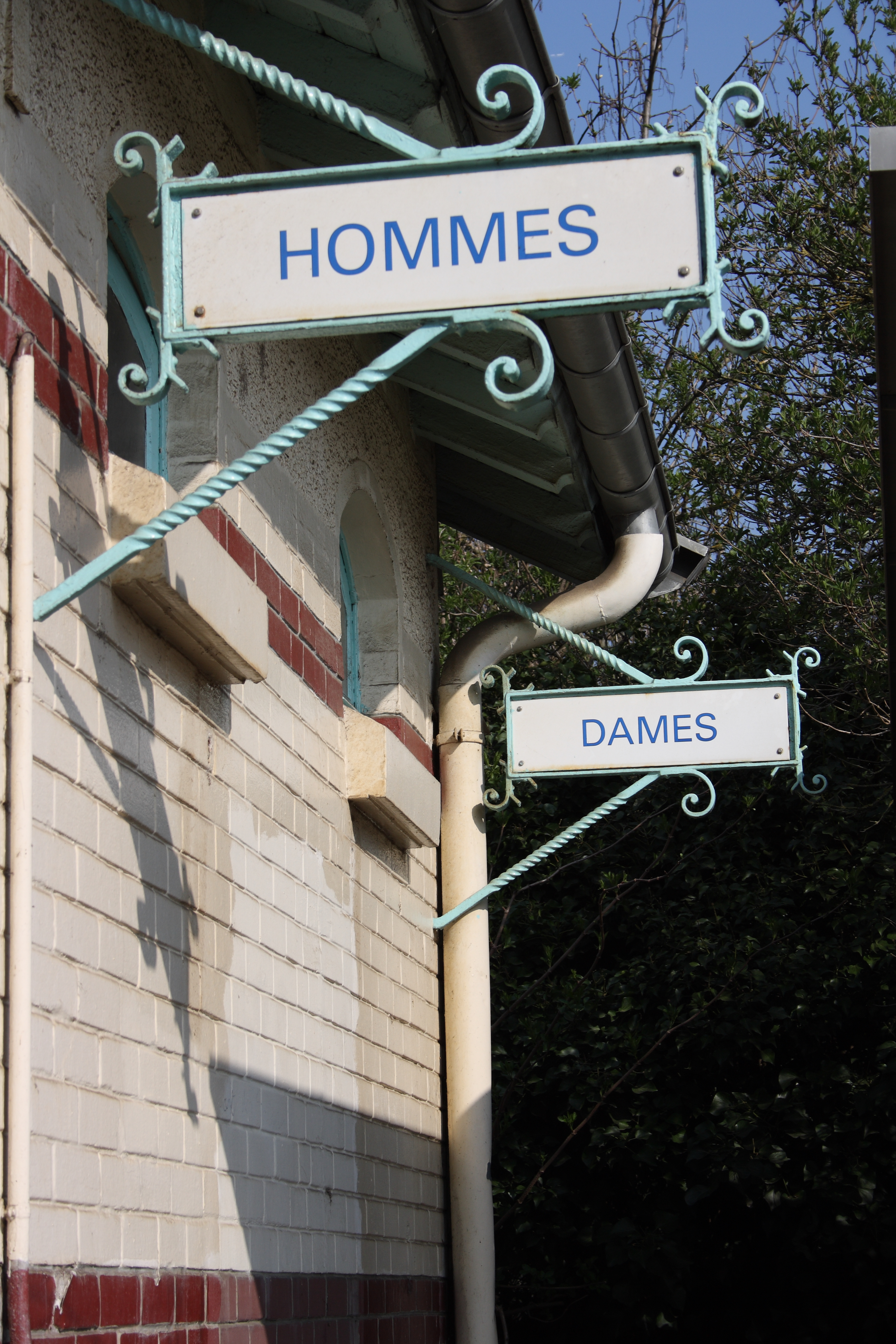

== Projects ==
=== Extension of the RER E ===
In 2028 or 2029, the station is scheduled to be connected with the RER E due of his extension to Mantes-la-Jolie, replacing the branch Paris-Saint-Lazare – Mantes-la-Jolie (via Poissy).

== See also ==
- List of Transilien stations
