= Lézarde Express Régionale =

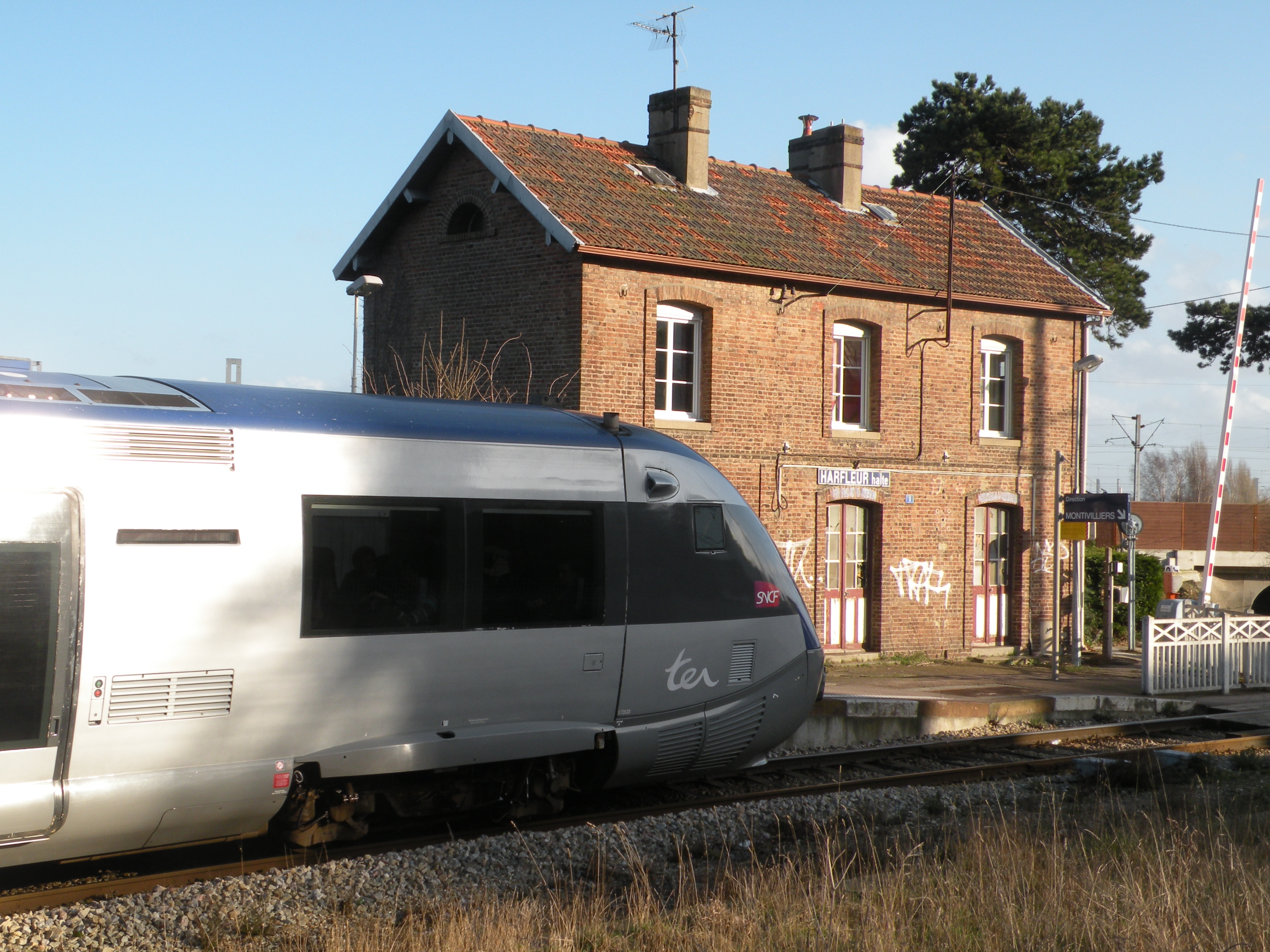
Lézarde Express Régionale

Lézarde Express Régionale or Chemin de Fer de la Vallée de la Lézarde was a railway line between Le Havre and Rolleville in Seine-Maritime, France.

The LER was a new fast service introduced in September 2001 to integrate this railway line into the Le Havre bus network and operated by the commune's council.

== History ==
The line connecting Le Havre to Fécamp was opened in stages. A spur was opened between Graville and Montivilliers on 1 October 1876. An extension was then built to Rolleville and opened on 14 August 1896 with the last section to Les Ifs (on the Le Havre to Fécamp line) on 24 December of the same year.

The line was in the 1990s transporting 150 passengers a day and it was decided to modernise the line and create a simpler and faster service: Lézarde Express Régionale.

== Lézarde Express Régionale ==
The journey was made by X 73500 and X 76500 DMUs for a length of journey of 20 minutes between Le Havre and Montivilliers.

The line was of simple design as it was formed by a single track from the junction with the main line to Paris up to its terminus in Rolleville. The frequency between Le Havre and Montivilliers was two return journeys every hour. The frequency between Montivilliers and Rolleville however was restricted to only 5 return journeys daily.
