= Dieppe Maritime station =

Railway station in Dieppe, France

Coordinates: 49°55′40″N 1°4′50″E

Dieppe Maritime station (French: Gare Maritime de Dieppe) was a railway station in the town of Dieppe, Seine-Maritime, France and was built by CF de l'Ouest in 1874. The station was the station for passengers from Paris to Newhaven, by steamers and then ferries.

Steam ships began crossing the English Channel in 1816 and linked Dieppe to Brighton. From 1824, the General Steam Navigation Company (GSNC) began operations with two crossings per week. Its ships were paddle steamers 25m in length that reached Brighton in nine hours.

In 1841, the London, Brighton & South Coast Railway (LB&SCR) was opened to Brighton, and subsequently to Lewes and Newhaven. Newhaven rebuilt its harbour to welcome larger ships.

The railway arrived in Dieppe from Rouen on 1 August 1848 and the then CF de Paris-Rouen which later became the CF de l'Ouest was becoming interested in the GSNC and a joint venture with the LB&SCR and Mr Marples (owner of the GSNC). Profits were then split three ways; 37% for the C.F. de l'Ouest, 44% for Marples and 19% for the LB&SCR.

By 1859, profits had begun to diminish and the two railway companies bought the maritime operations.

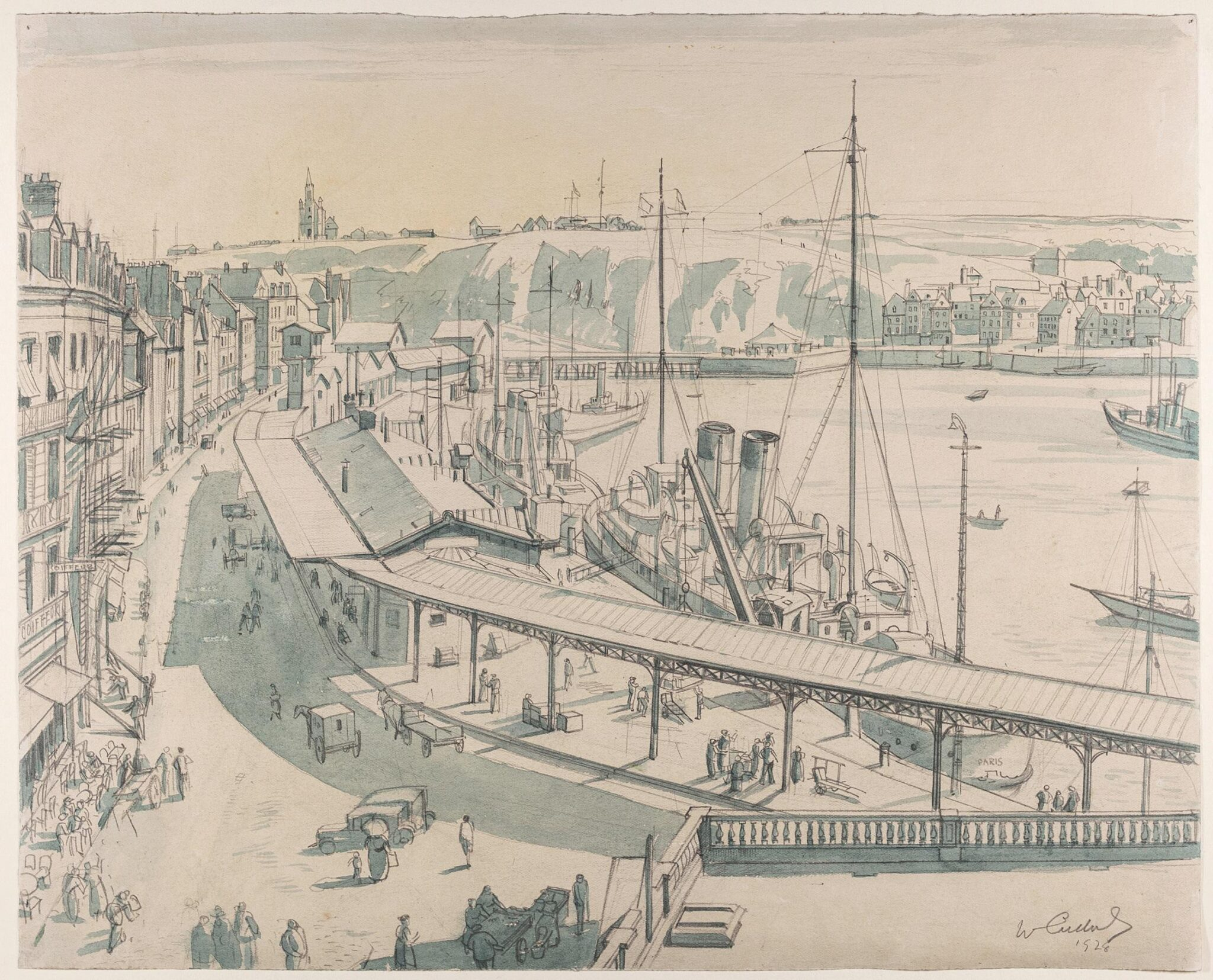
1928 panting signed "Cullus" or "Cullens"

The original "Steamer Depot" was built on the quai Henri IV connected to the Dieppe station by a short branch line that ran along quai Duquesne, past the trade and industry offices, fire station, the fishing syndicate and the public fish market. The Paris train ran alongside the quay in front of a long narrow building that included goods and passenger terminals and a restaurant. This building later became the Gare Maritime's goods depot when, following deepening of the harbour, a new passenger terminal was built further up the quay. This had one track either side of a red brick building and could handle two passenger trains simultaneously. As well as the passenger ferries, a regular service of smaller freight ferries also ran between Dieppe and Newhaven and the station became increasingly important for urgent goods as well as for passengers.

The passenger terminal was damaged beyond repair during World War II. It was demolished soon afterwards and, after several years when passengers used temporary buildings, a new two-storey concrete terminal building in a modernist style was opened on 17 June 1953. It had three railway tracks, one of them running along the side of the quay, and could handle two locomotive-hauled boat trains and the local railcar to Rouen. In the 1960s, diesel traction began to replace steam locos on the boat trains operating to and from the harbour station.

Combined rail and ferry services ended in 1994 after Stena Line, at that time operating as Stena Sealink on the Newhaven-Dieppe and Dover-Calais crossings, had transferred to a new terminal on the other side of the harbour. These changes coincided with the opening of the Channel Tunnel and the concomitant withdrawal of all SNCF Channel boat trains.

The whole station was demolished in early 1995, and virtually no physical traces now remain.

== Ships from Dieppe Maritime ==
- SS Arundel (1900)
- SS Brighton (1903)
- SS Newhaven (1910)
- Sussex (1913)
- Worthing (1928–1955)
- Brighton (1933–1940)
- Londres (1939–1963)
- Arromanches (1947–1965)
- Falaise (1947–1973)
- Lisieux(1953)
- Falaise (1964)
- Villandry (1964)
- Valençay (1964)
- Senlac (1973–1984)
