= Château du Grand-Serquigny =

17th-century château in France

Coordinates: 49.1063°N 0.7095°E

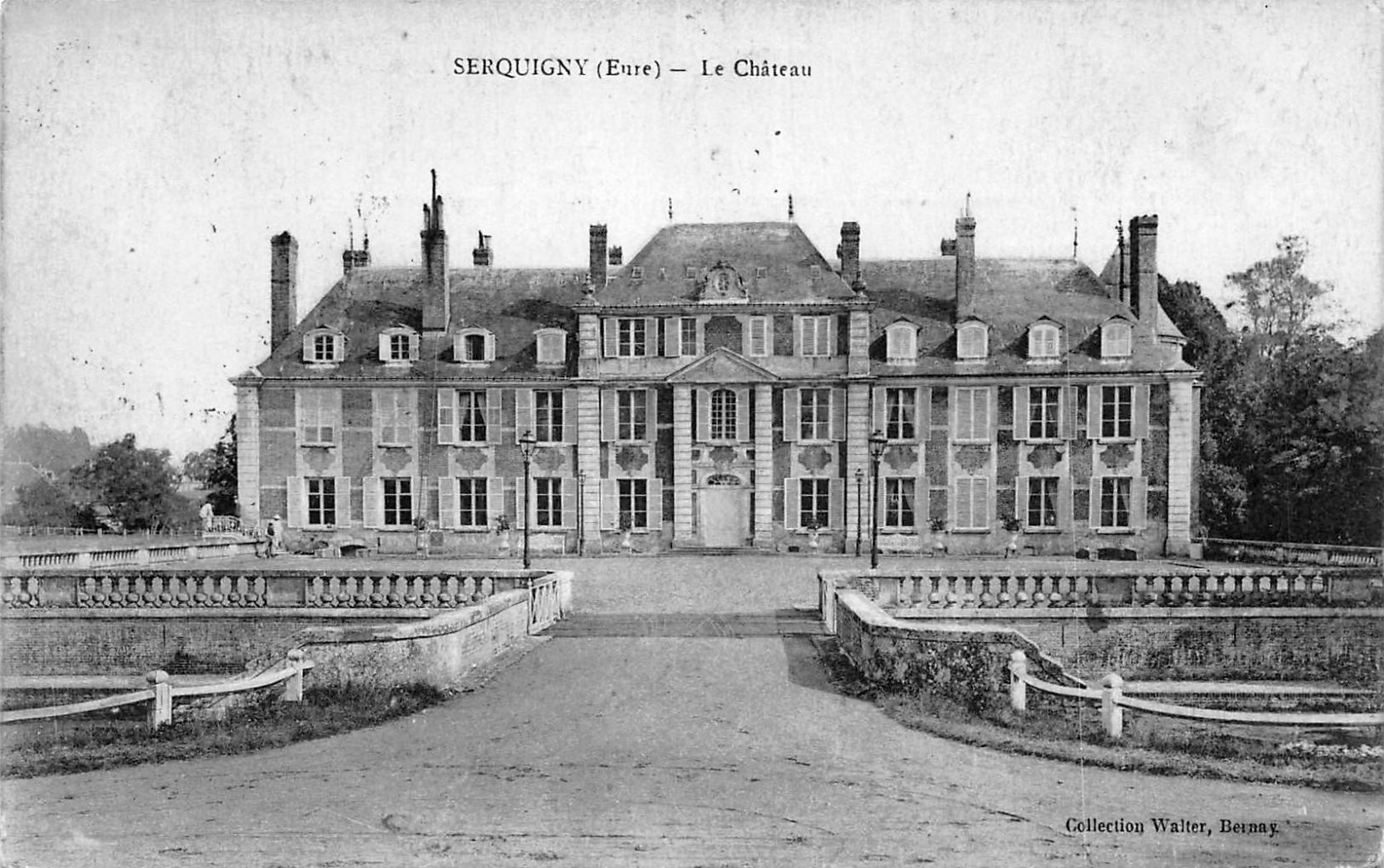
Undated postcard depicting the chateau

Château du Grand-Serquigny is a 17th-century château in Serquigny, Normandy, France. The building was largely destroyed by fire on 31 December 2023. The moat reportedly hindered firefighting efforts.
