= Arboretum du parc de Rouelles =

Arboretum in Normandy, France

Coordinates: 49°31′40″N 0°10′43″E

The Arboretum du parc de Rouelles, also known as the Arboretum des Ardennes, is an arboretum located within the Parc de Rouelles (over 150 hectares) on the Chemin Vicinal 3, south of Montivilliers, north of Le Havre, Seine-Maritime, Normandy, France.

Long ago, the park was a medieval property of Pays de Caux with castle, park, farm, and forest. Most buildings were destroyed by bombardment in 1944, but a fine dovecote remains (dating to 1631). Today's park was created from 1980 to 1993.

The Arboretum des Ardennes proper contains 200 tree species, organized as 25 botanical families, all planted in the early 1980s. Specimens include local species such as beech, hornbeam, and chestnut, as well as exotics including American elm, eucalyptus, and Ginkgo biloba. A second arboretum is dedicated exclusively to conifers.

== See also ==
- List of botanical gardens in France
