= SS Worthing =

Steam-powered ferry

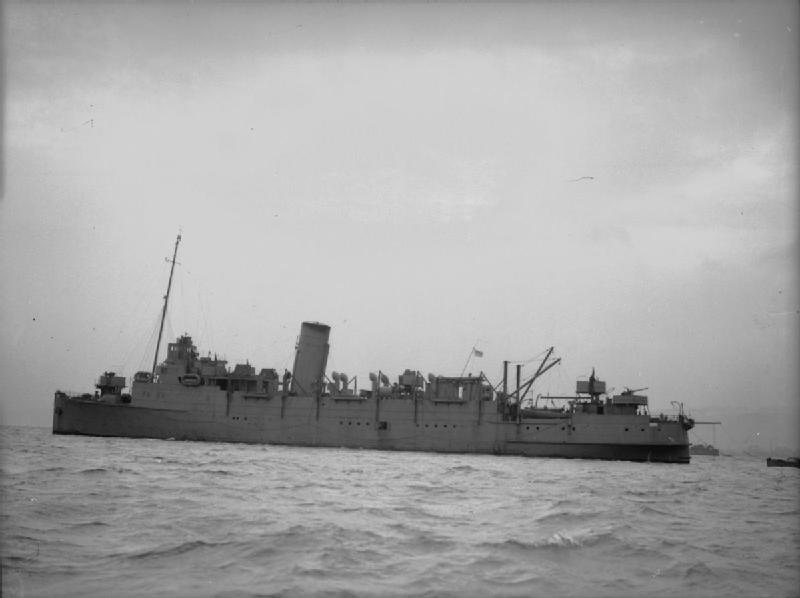
- SS Worthing as HMS Brigadier during World War II

History

United Kingdom
- Name: SS Worthing
- Operator: Southern Railway
- Completed: 1928
- Fate: Sold 1955, scrapped 1964

General characteristics
- Tonnage: 2,343 tons
- Length: 300 ft
- Beam: 39 ft
- Speed: 24 knots
- Capacity: 1,500 passengers

SS Worthing was a steam-powered ferry operating between Newhaven and Dieppe.

The Worthing was built for the Southern Railway and launched on 3 May 1928. Her first captain was Charles Lever Cook MBE. She was operated by Southern Railway until World War II.

The Worthing became part of the British Expeditionary Force to France, receiving her orders to be in Southampton on 8 September 1939 and sailing to Southampton two days later. She became a troop carrier, crossing the English Channel to Cherbourg six times. The Worthing sailed for the Royal Navy until 23 March 1945.

After the World War II, the Worthing resumed civilian service as a Newhaven-Dieppe ferry: first for the Southern Railway until 1948 and then for British Railways until 1954. In 1955 she was sold and moved to Greece, where she was renamed the Phryni.

== Naming history ==
- SS Worthing 1928-1940
- HMS Worthing 1940-1940
- HMS Brigadier 1940-1944
- SS Worthing 1944-1955
- Phryni 1955-1968
