= Gisors =

- Commune
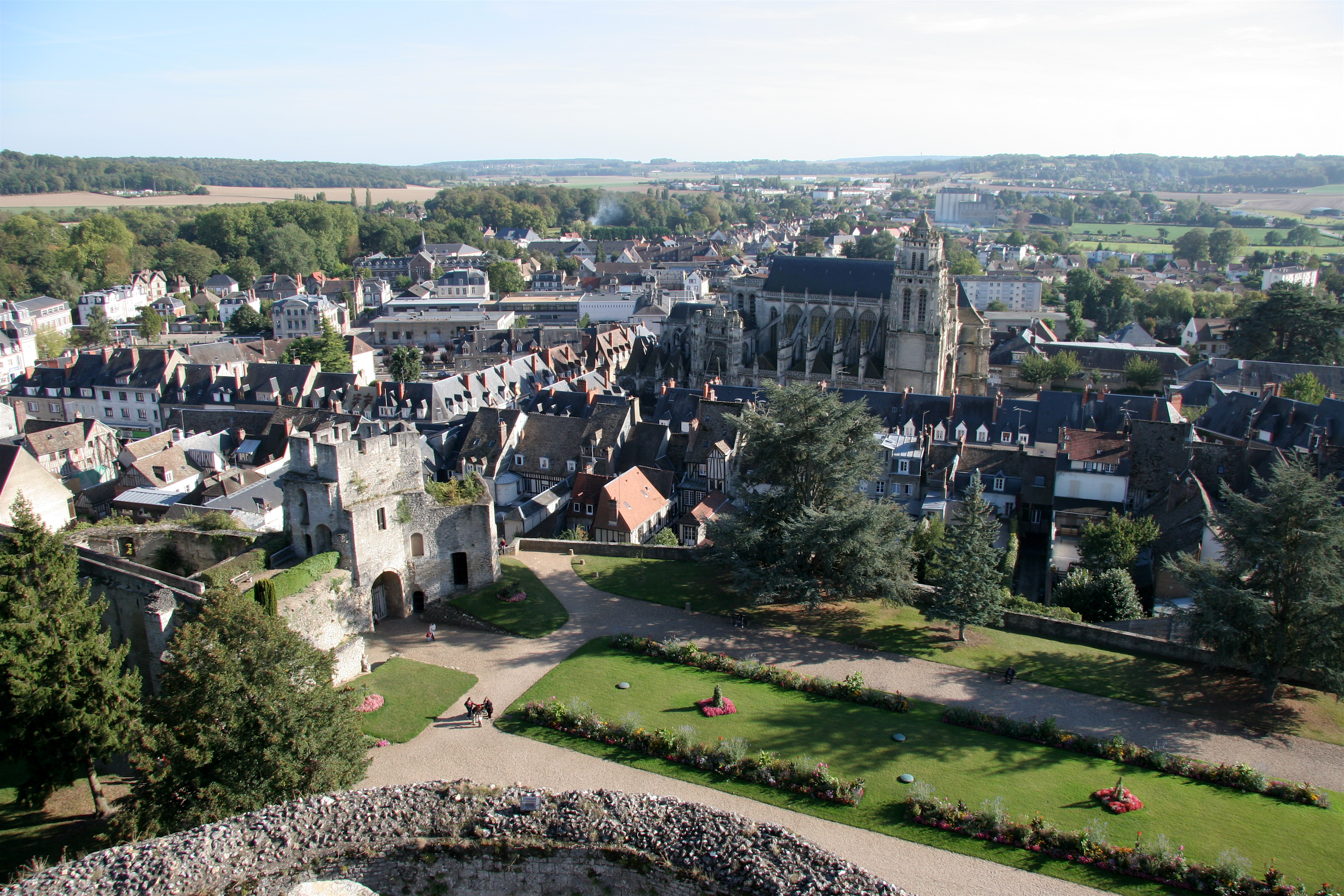
- City as seen from the castle terrasse

- Coat of arms
- Location of Gisors
- Location within France Location within Normandy
- Coordinates: 49°16′52″N 1°46′38″E
- Country: France
- Region: Normandy
- Department: Eure
- Arrondissement: Les Andelys
- Canton: Gisors
- Intercommunality: Vexin Normand

Government
  - Mayor (2022–2026): José Cerqueira
- Area^{1}: 16.67 km^{2} (6.44 sq mi)
- Elevation: 74 m (243 ft)
- Highest elevation: 142 m (466 ft)
- Lowest elevation: 47 m (154 ft)
- Population (2023): 12,410
  - Density: 744.5/km^{2} (1,928/sq mi)
- Time zone: UTC+01:00 (CET)
  - Summer (DST): UTC+02:00 (CEST)
- INSEE/Postal code: 27284 /27140
- ^{1} French Land Register data, which excludes lakes, ponds, glaciers > 1 km^{2} (0.386 sq mi or 247 acres) and river estuaries.

Gisors (French pronunciation: [ʒizɔʁ]) is a commune in the French department of Eure, Normandy, France. It is located 62.9 km (39.1 mi) northwest from the centre of Paris.

Gisors, together with the neighbouring communes of Trie-Château and Trie-la-Ville, form an urban area of 14,579 inhabitants (2022). This urban area is a satellite town of Paris.

== Geography ==
Gisors is located in the Vexin normand region of Normandy, at the confluence of the rivers Epte, Troesne and Réveillon.

== Population ==
Historical population

Year	Pop.	±% p.a.
1793	3,021	—
1800	3,650	+2.74%
1806	3,277	−1.78%
1821	3,339	+0.13%
1831	3,533	+0.57%
1836	3,364	−0.98%
1841	3,624	+1.50%
1846	3,616	−0.04%
1851	3,653	+0.20%
1856	3,694	+0.22%
1861	3,654	−0.22%
1866	3,573	−0.45%
1872	3,834	+1.18%
1876	4,047	+1.36%
1881	4,362	+1.51%
1886	4,359	−0.01%
1891	4,462	+0.47%
1896	4,681	+0.96%
1901	4,861	+0.76%

Year	Pop.	±% p.a.
1906	4,888	+0.11%
1911	5,508	+2.42%
1921	5,494	−0.03%
1926	5,564	+0.25%
1931	5,868	+1.07%
1936	5,867	−0.00%
1946	5,078	−1.43%
1954	5,670	+1.39%
1962	6,398	+1.52%
1968	7,329	+2.29%
1975	8,069	+1.38%
1982	8,732	+1.13%
1990	9,481	+1.03%
1999	10,882	+1.54%
2007	11,677	+0.89%
2012	11,283	−0.68%
2017	11,537	+0.45%
2023	12,410	+1.22%

Source: EHESS and INSEE (1968–2023)

== Transport ==
The Gisors station is the terminus of a Transilien suburban rail service from the Paris Saint-Lazare station, and of a TER Normandie local service to Serqueux.

== Sights ==
- Château de Gisors, built in the 11th century.
- The Saint-Gervais-Saint-Protais parish church is an outstanding monument fusing Gothic and Renaissance architecture.
- A field near Gisors was the site of the Cutting of the elm, a medieval diplomatic incident.
- Château de Boisgeloup, former home and atelier of Pablo Picasso.
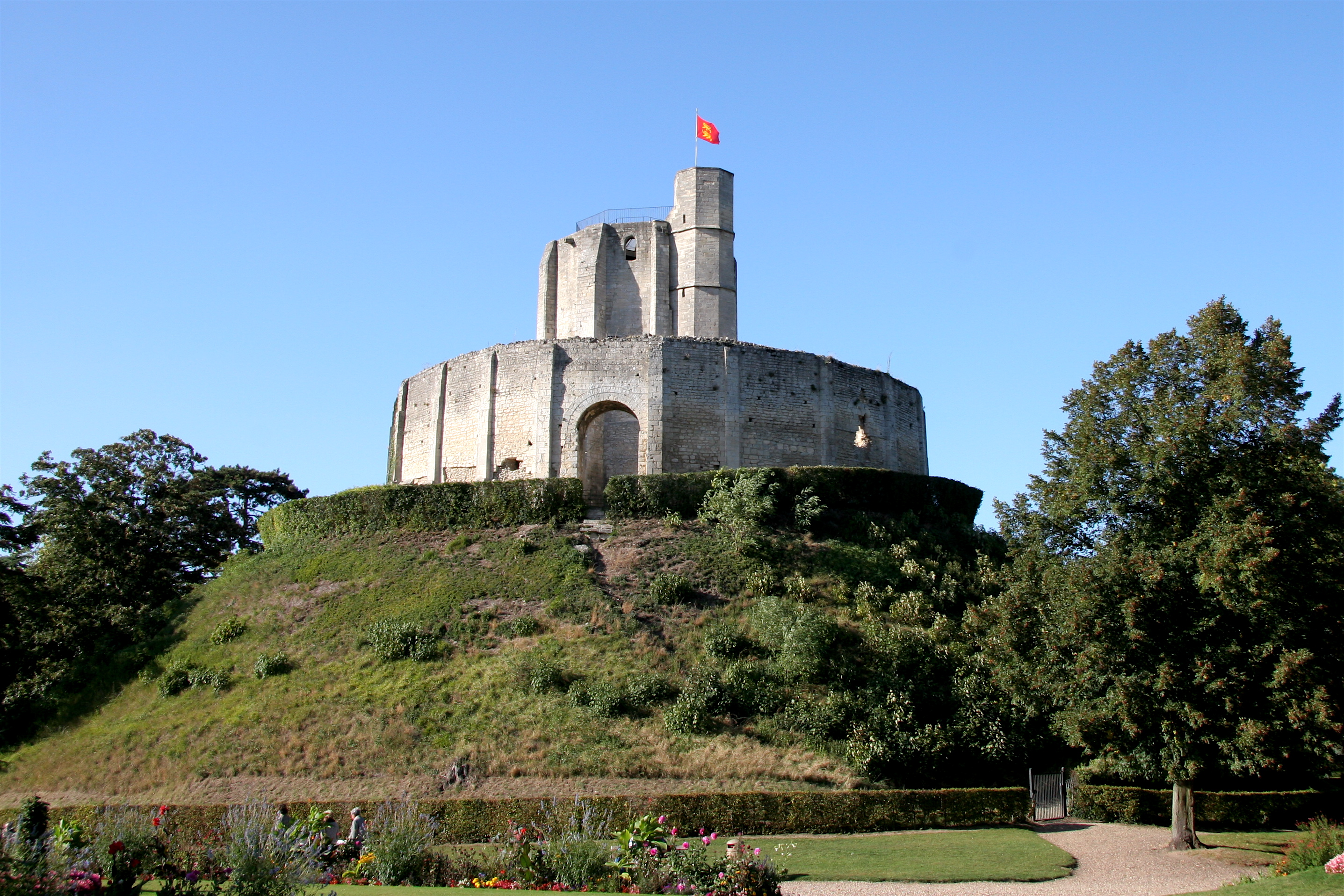
Motte and Castle

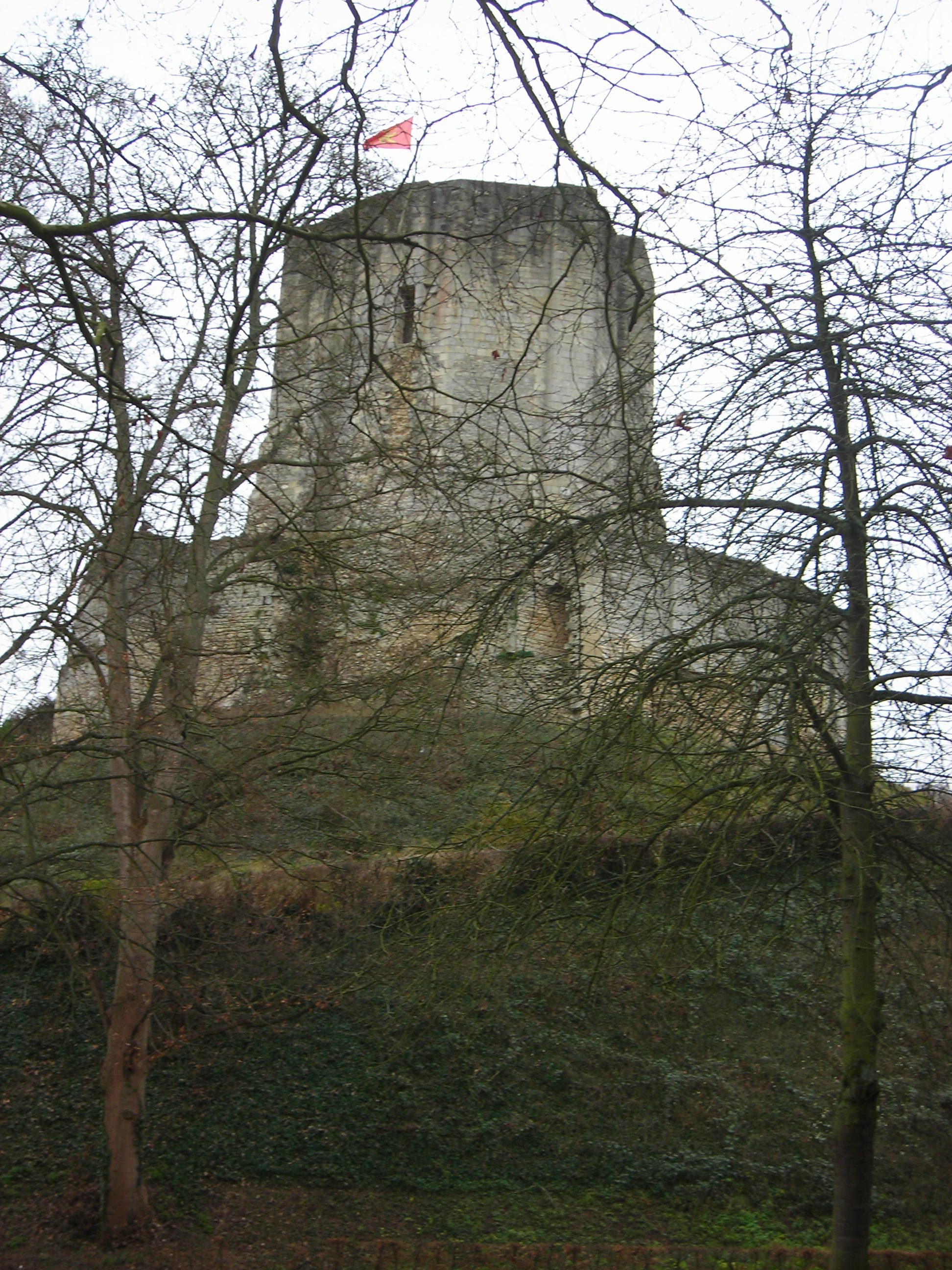
Castle of Gisors

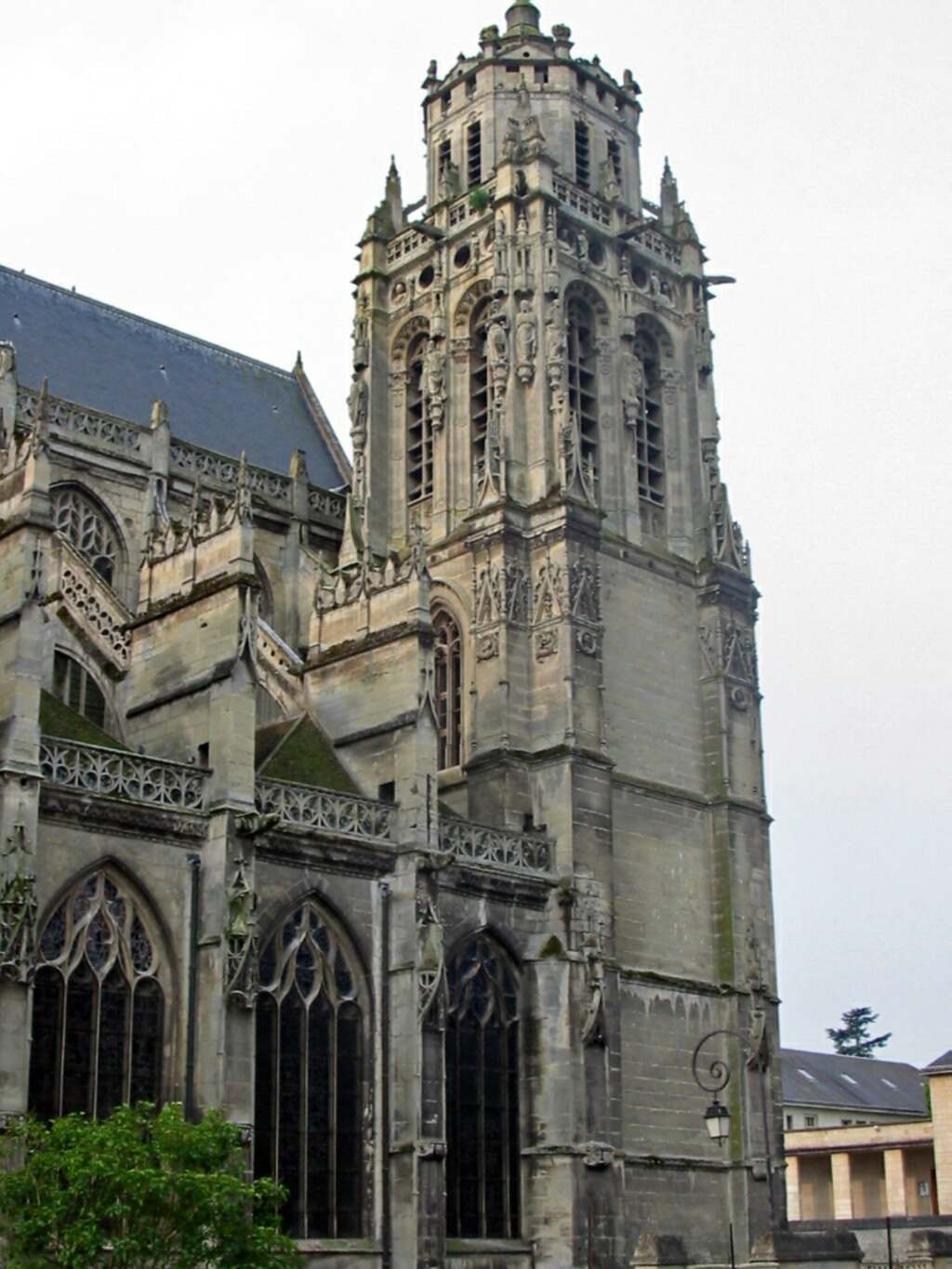
The so-called Grosse Tour ("Big Tower") of the St-Gervais-St-Protais church was built between 1542 and 1590.

== See also ==
- Communes of the Eure department
