= Serquigny =

- Commune
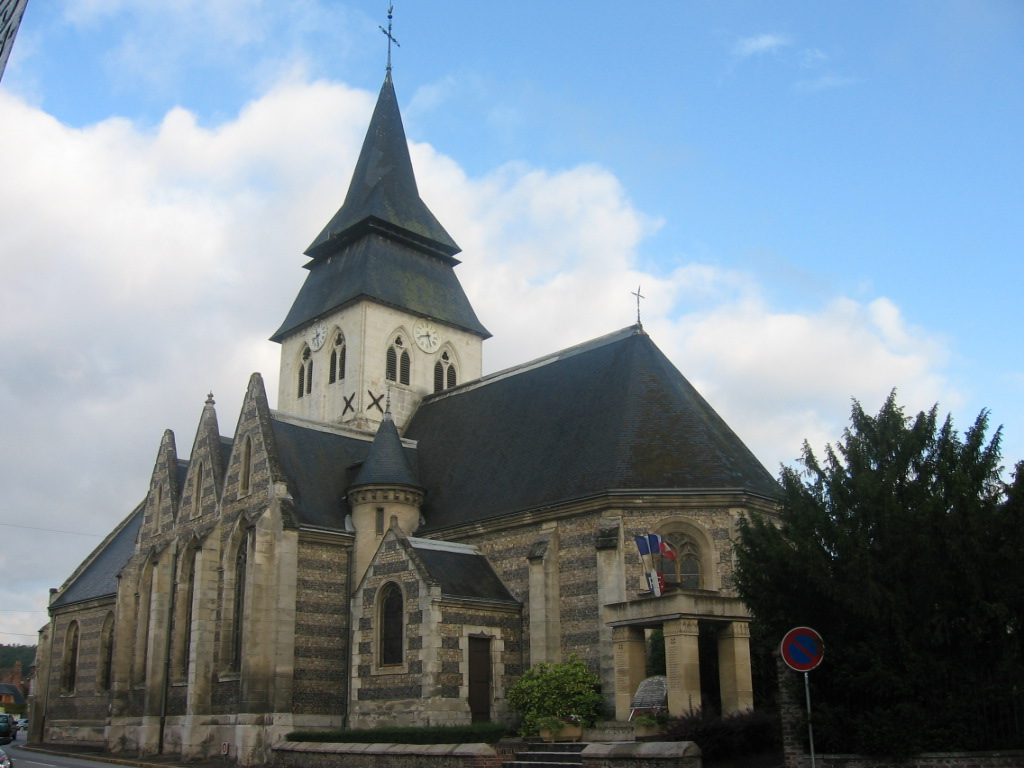
- The church in Serquigny

- Coat of arms
- Location of Serquigny
- Location within France Location within Normandy
- Coordinates: 49°06′38″N 0°42′48″E
- Country: France
- Region: Normandy
- Department: Eure
- Arrondissement: Bernay
- Canton: Bernay

Government
  - Mayor (2020–2026): Frédéric Delamare
- Area^{1}: 11.4 km^{2} (4.4 sq mi)
- Elevation: 81 m (266 ft)
- Highest elevation: 155 m (509 ft)
- Lowest elevation: 66 m (217 ft)
- Population (2023): 1,754
  - Density: 154/km^{2} (398/sq mi)
- Time zone: UTC+01:00 (CET)
  - Summer (DST): UTC+02:00 (CEST)
- INSEE/Postal code: 27622 /27470
- ^{1} French Land Register data, which excludes lakes, ponds, glaciers > 1 km^{2} (0.386 sq mi or 247 acres) and river estuaries.

Serquigny (French pronunciation: [sɛʁkiɲi]) is a commune of the Eure department in Normandy in northern France.

It lies on the rail line from Cherbourg to Paris. In the village there is a privately owned manor house called Chateau de Maubuisson.

== Geography ==
The commune along with another 69 communes shares part of a 4,747 hectare, Natura 2000 conservation area, called Risle, Guiel, Charentonne.

== Landmarks ==
- Château du Grand-Serquigny

== Démographie ==
Historical population
Year	Pop.	±% p.a.
1968	1,794	—
1975	2,112	+2.36%
1982	2,236	+0.82%
1990	2,197	−0.22%
1999	2,053	−0.75%
2007	2,204	+0.89%
2012	2,048	−1.46%
2017	1,987	−0.60%
2023	1,754	−2.06%
Source: INSEE

== See also ==
- Communes of the Eure department
