= Serqueux station =

Railway station in Serqueux, France

Serqueux
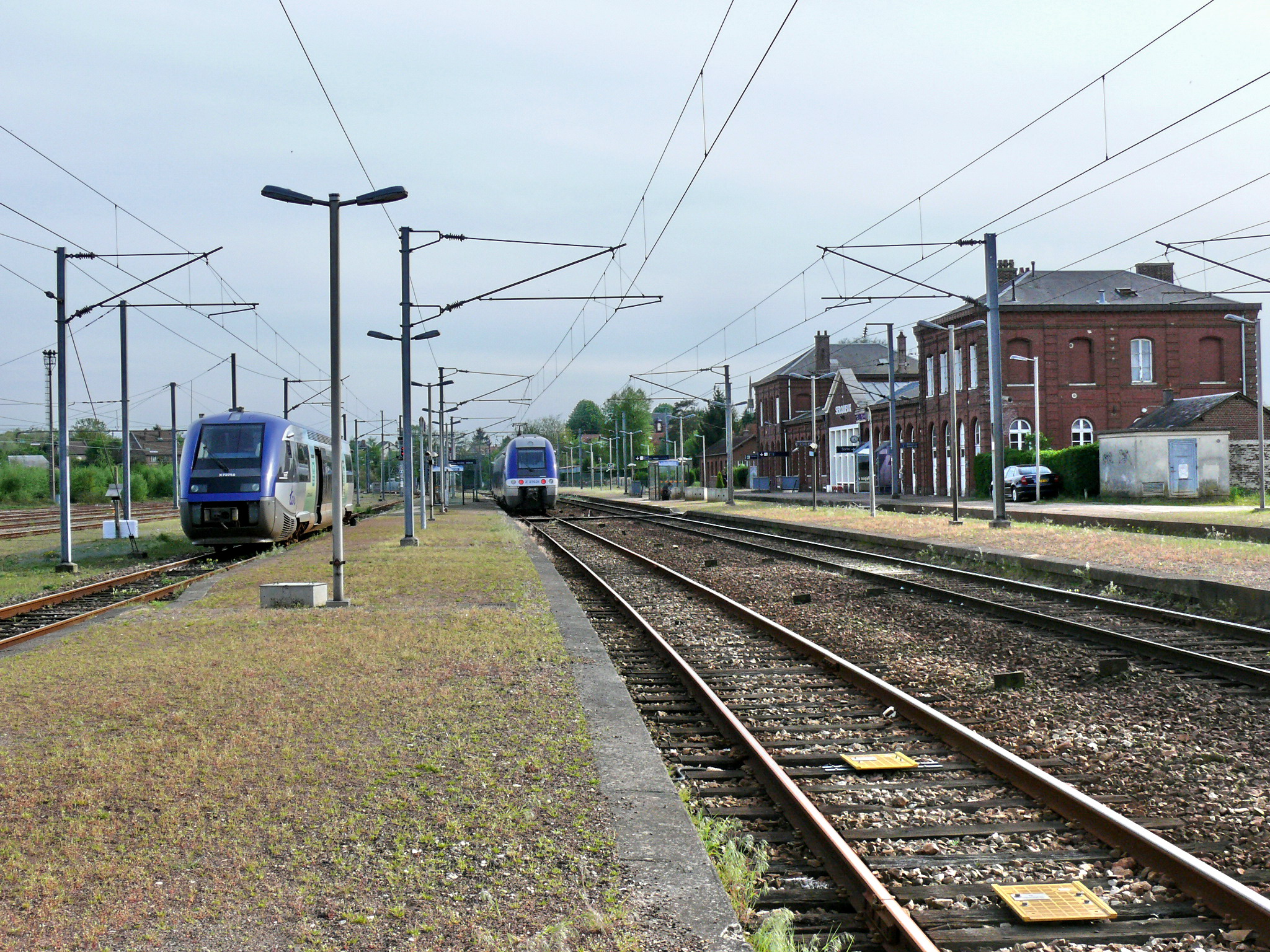
- The station in 2008. Amiens – Rouen tracks on the right; on the left, former Paris – Dieppe line.

General information
- Location: Place de la Gare; 76400 Serqueux, France
- Coordinates: 49°37′53″N 1°32′22″E
- Owner: RFF/SNCF
- Lines: Amiens–Rouen railway, Saint-Denis–Dieppe railway
- Platforms: 1 outside, 2 island
- Tracks: 4 plus sidings

Other information
- Station code: 87411470

History
- Opened: 18 April 1867

Services
| Preceding station | TER Hauts-de-France | Following station |
|---|---|---|
| Abancourt towards Lille-Flandres | Krono K45 | Montérolier–Buchy towards Rouen-RD |
| Formerie towards Amiens | Proxi P45 | Sommery towards Rouen-RD |
| Preceding station | TER Normandie | Following station |
| Gournay–Ferrières towards Gisors | Proxi | Terminus |
Location

Serqueux station (French: Gare de Serqueux) is a railway station in the commune of Serqueux in the Seine-Maritime department, France. It is an interchange station between the Amiens–Rouen line and the Gisors–Serqueux–Dieppe line.

== History ==
The station also had a connection to Charleval.

Serqueux, an important railway junction, was bombed in World War II. The church and part of the village were destroyed, but the station, with its architecture typical of the Nord company, remained untouched.

In November 2006, the administrative tribunal ruled the closure of the Serqueux–Dieppe section of the Paris Saint-Lazare to Dieppe line to be illegal, but the SNCF had already dismantled the line installations. The right of way has been turned into a greenway between Beaubec-la-Rosière and Saint-Aubin-le-Cauf.

== Current service ==
The station is served by TER Normandie and TER Hauts-de-France trains from Rouen to Amiens and Lille and by TER Normandie trains to Gisors and coaches to Dieppe.

== Equipment ==
The station was electrified with 25 kV 50 Hz alternating current in the course of electrification of the Amiens–Rouen line. The initial section of the Gisors–Serqueux line, which is not yet electrified, is also equipped with catenaries. That line, affected by the government retrenchment of 2009 and closed to commercial traffic since 19 January 2009, could be rapidly modernised.

Renovation of the passenger facilities (work on the passage under the tracks and the carpark, repainting) was planned for 2009.

== See also ==
- List of SNCF stations in Normandy
