= Dieppe station =

Railway station in Dieppe, France

Coordinates: 49°55′17″N 1°4′52″E

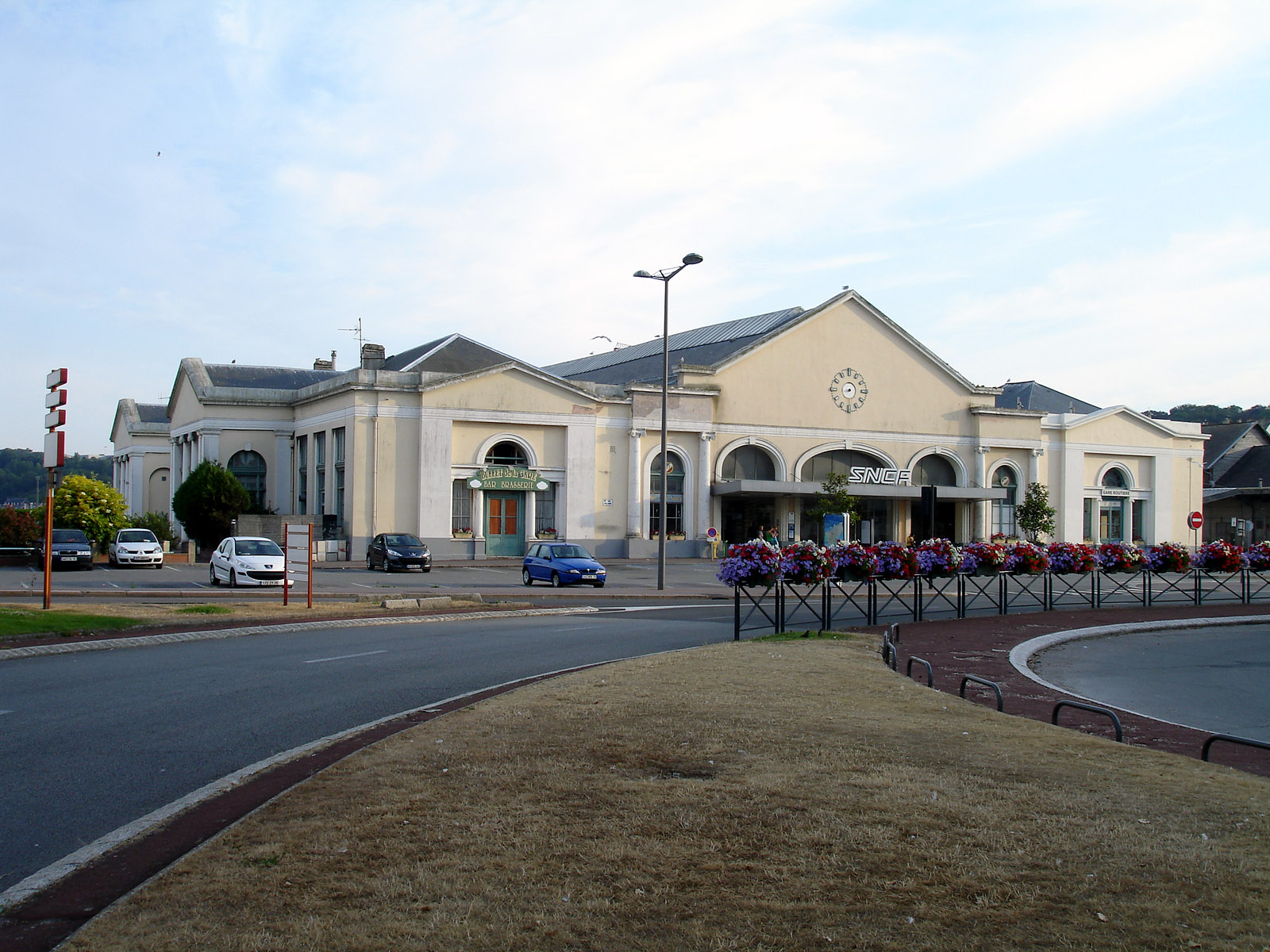
Dieppe station

Dieppe station (French: Gare de Dieppe) is the train station for the town of Dieppe, Seine-Maritime and was built by Chemins de fer de Paris à Cherbourg and opened on 28 July 1848. It used to have a direct connection with Paris-St. Lazare via Serqueux and Gisors, but this line was closed in 2006. Along with Dieppe-Port, it was a stop on the trains from Paris to London via Newhaven. The station is now the terminus of a line from Paris via Rouen.

== Services ==
The station is served by fast and local trains to Rouen.

Preceding station	TER Normandie	Following station
Auffay towards Rouen-RD	Krono	Terminus
Saint-Aubin-sur-Scie towards Rouen-RD	Proxi	Terminus
