= Famechon, Somme =

Famechon
- Commune
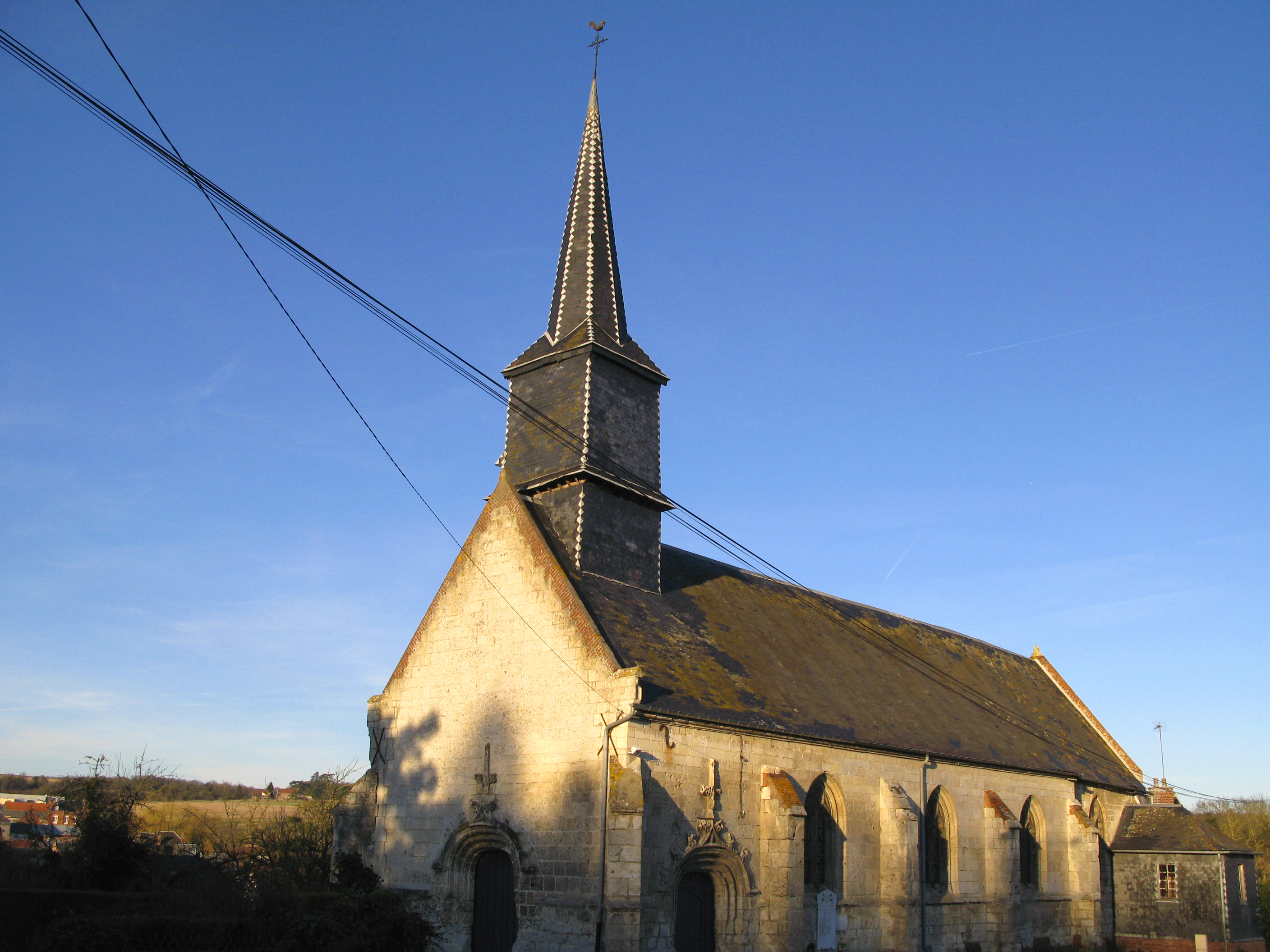
- The church in Famechon
- Location of Famechon
- Location within France Location within Hauts-de-France
- Coordinates: 49°45′39″N 2°02′30″E
- Country: France
- Region: Hauts-de-France
- Department: Somme
- Arrondissement: Amiens
- Canton: Poix-de-Picardie
- Intercommunality: CC Somme Sud-Ouest

Government
  - Mayor (2020–2026): Christian Furgerot
- Area^{1}: 4.84 km^{2} (1.87 sq mi)
- Elevation: 78 m (256 ft)
- Highest elevation: 183 m (600 ft)
- Lowest elevation: 75 m (246 ft)
- Population (2023): 270
  - Density: 56/km^{2} (140/sq mi)
- Time zone: UTC+01:00 (CET)
  - Summer (DST): UTC+02:00 (CEST)
- INSEE/Postal code: 80301 /80290
- ^{1} French Land Register data, which excludes lakes, ponds, glaciers > 1 km^{2} (0.386 sq mi or 247 acres) and river estuaries.

Famechon (French pronunciation: [famʃɔ̃]) is a commune in the Somme département in northern France.

== Geography ==
Famechon lies about 25 miles (40 km) southwest of Amiens, at the junction of the departmental roads D94 and D920.

== Demography ==
Historical population
Year	Pop.	±% p.a.
1968	184	—
1975	171	−1.04%
1982	191	+1.59%
1990	187	−0.26%
1999	173	−0.86%
2007	227	+3.45%
2012	245	+1.54%
2017	266	+1.66%
2023	270	+0.25%
Source: INSEE

== See also ==
- Communes of the Somme department
