= Le Havre station =

Train station in France

Le Havre
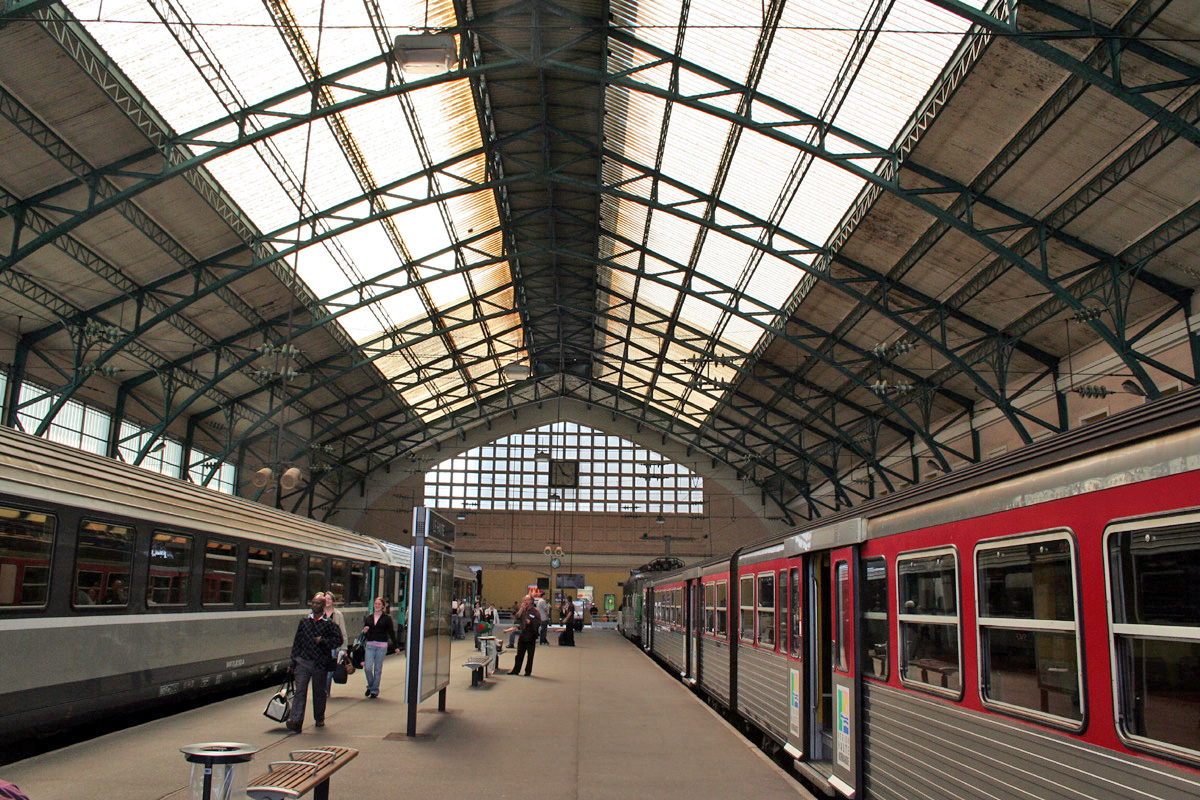

General information
- Location: Le Havre, Normandy, France
- Coordinates: 49°29′34″N 0°7′31″E
- Owner: SNCF
- Operator: SNCF
- Line: Paris–Le Havre railway
- Tracks: 5

Other information
- Station code: 87413013

History
- Opened: 1847

Passengers
- 2024: 2,070,670
Services
Preceding station	SNCF	Following station
Terminus	TGV	Rouen-Rive-Droite towards Marseille
Preceding station	TER Normandie	Following station
Bréauté-Beuzeville towards Paris-Saint-Lazare	Krono+	Terminus
Étainhus-Saint-Romain towards Rouen-RD	Proxi	Terminus
Terminus	Proxi	Harfleur towards Fécamp
Location

Le Havre station (French: Gare du Havre) is the main railway station located in Le Havre, Seine-Maritime, France. The station was opened on 22 March 1847 and is located on the Paris–Le Havre railway. The train services are operated by SNCF.

The station building was built in 1932 by Henri Pacon for the CF de l'Etat replacing the older building along with a new clock tower. It is a terminus and the passenger hall is parallel to the street. Of the old building, only the rooftop by Juste Lisch remains.

== Train services ==
The station is served by the following services:

- High speed services (TGV) Le Havre - Rouen - Massy TGV - Lyon - Avignon - Marseille
- Regional services (TER Normandie) Le Havre - Rouen - Paris
- Regional services (TER Normandie) Le Havre - Bréauté-Beuzeville - Yvetot - Rouen
- Local services (TER Normandie) Le Havre - Bréauté-Beuzeville - Fécamp

== Tram services ==
The station is served by the Le Havre tramway, which has a tram stop outside the entrance of the station.

- A (La Plage - Hotel de Ville - Gare - Universite - Mare Rouge - Mont-Gaillard)
- B (La Plage - Hotel de Ville - Gare - Universite - Atrium - Caucriauville)

== See also ==
- List of SNCF stations in Normandy
