= Serqueux, Seine-Maritime =

Serqueux
- Commune
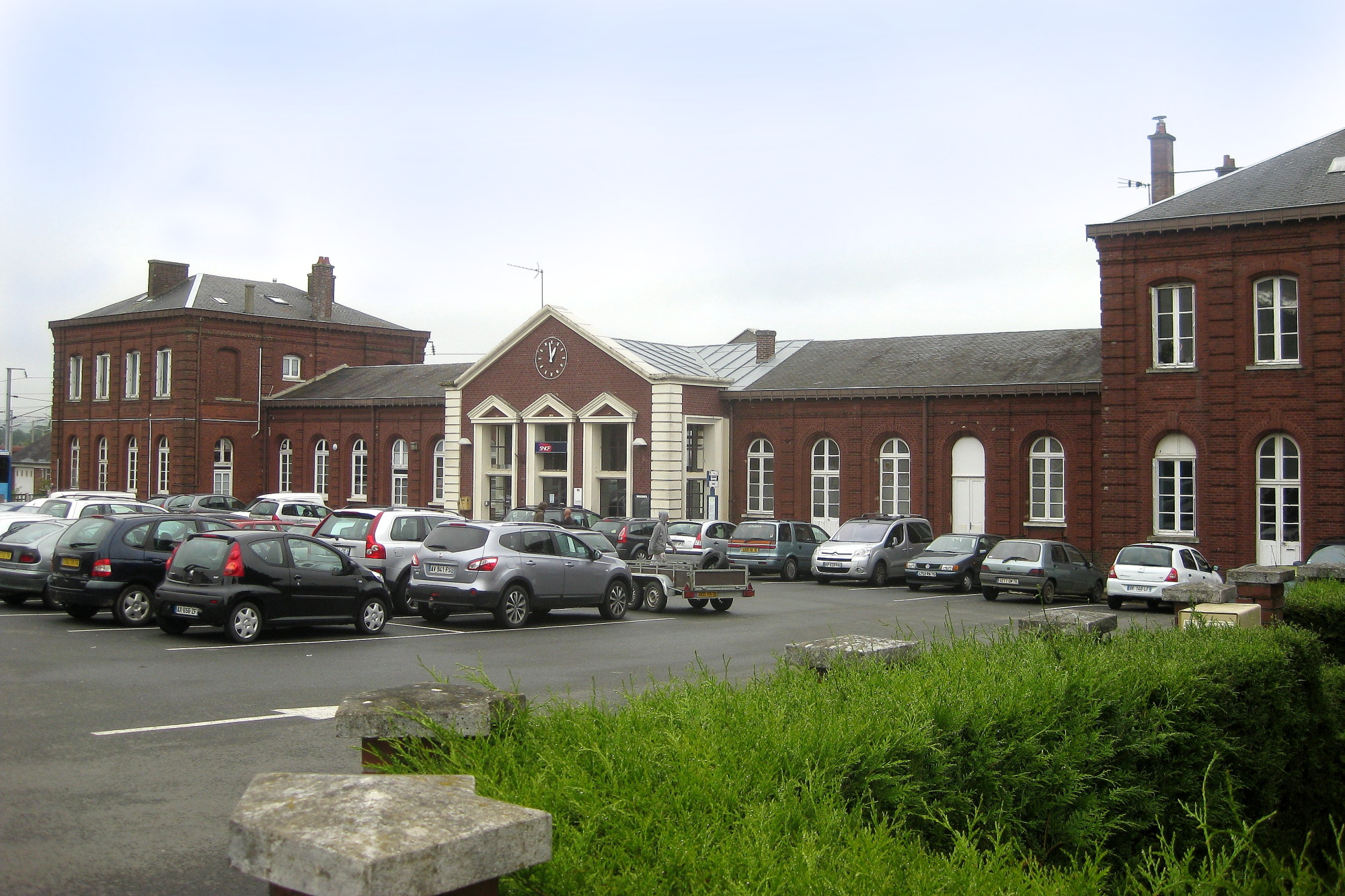
- The railway station in Serqueux

- Coat of arms
- Location of Serqueux
- Location within France Location within Normandy
- Coordinates: 49°37′57″N 1°32′20″E
- Country: France
- Region: Normandy
- Department: Seine-Maritime
- Arrondissement: Dieppe
- Canton: Gournay-en-Bray
- Intercommunality: CC 4 rivières

Government
  - Mayor (2026–32): Thomas Hermand
- Area^{1}: 5.76 km^{2} (2.22 sq mi)
- Elevation: 170 m (560 ft)
- Highest elevation: 189 m (620 ft)
- Lowest elevation: 137 m (449 ft)
- Population (2023): 943
  - Density: 164/km^{2} (424/sq mi)
- Time zone: UTC+01:00 (CET)
  - Summer (DST): UTC+02:00 (CEST)
- INSEE/Postal code: 76672 /76440
- ^{1} French Land Register data, which excludes lakes, ponds, glaciers > 1 km^{2} (0.386 sq mi or 247 acres) and river estuaries.

Serqueux (French pronunciation: [sɛʁkø]) is a commune in the Seine-Maritime department in the Normandy region in northern France.

== Geography ==
A village situated at the source of the Epte river in the Pays de Bray, some 30 miles (48 km) southeast of Dieppe at the junction of the D 1314, D 13 and D 83 roads. The Serqueux station is an important interchange station for TER regional trains, with connections to Rouen, Amiens, Lille and Gisors. Serqueux has an important plant producing most of the gum arabic in the world. The commune has also an important commercial zone which is by far the biggest in the canton.

== History ==
First mentioned as "Sarkeus" in the twelfth century, the name derives from the Greek sarkofagos, owing to the large Merovingian necropolis in the commune.

Much of the village including the church, was destroyed by Allied bombing during World War II. Nevertheless, the railway station, which was the goal of the bombings, remained untouched.

In 1945, the commune was awarded the Croix de Guerre.

== Population ==
Historical population
Year	Pop.	±% p.a.
1968	816	—
1975	767	−0.88%
1982	764	−0.06%
1990	853	+1.39%
1999	988	+1.65%
2007	1,061	+0.90%
2012	1,000	−1.18%
2017	991	−0.18%
2023	943	−0.82%
Source: INSEE

== Places of interest ==
- The modern church, replacing the sixteenth-century one, destroyed during World War II.
- Traces of a feudal castle.
- Ruins of the old church.

== See also ==
- Communes of the Seine-Maritime department
