= Gisors station =

Railway station in Gisors, France

Gisors
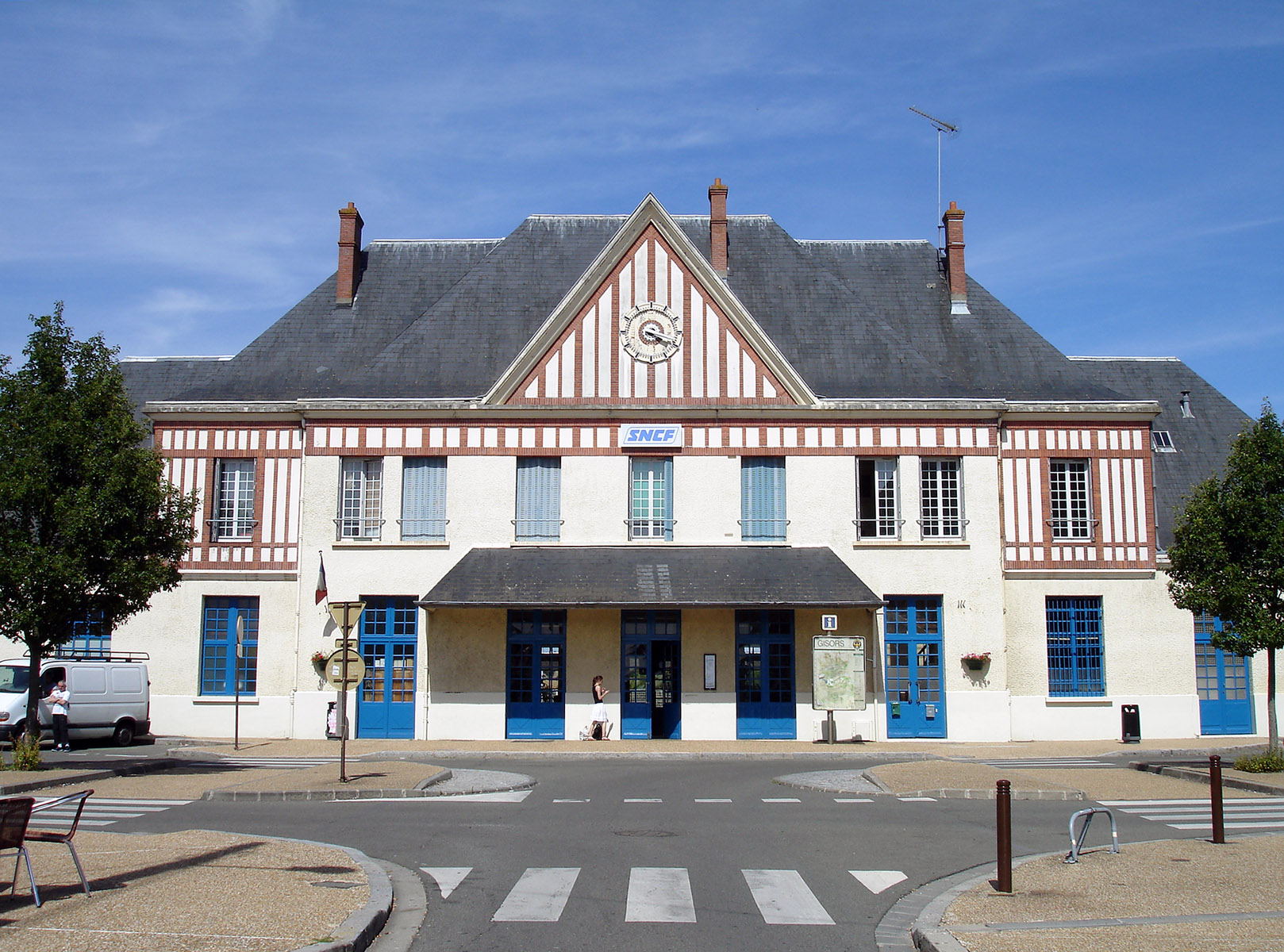

General information
- Location: Place de la Gare; Gisors; France
- Coordinates: 49°17′7″N 1°47′5″E
- Owner: SNCF
- Operator: SNCF

Construction
- Accessible: Yes, by prior reservation

Other information
- Station code: 87381244

History
- Opened: 4 October 1868

Services
Preceding station	TER Normandie	Following station
Terminus	Proxi	Sérifontaine towards Serqueux
Preceding station	Transilien	Following station
Trie-Château towards Paris-St.-Lazare	Line J	Terminus
Location

Gisors station (formerly: Gisors-Embranchement) is a railway station serving the town Gisors, Eure department, northwestern France. It is situated on the now partially disbanded Saint-Denis–Dieppe railway.

The station is serviced by both TER Normandie and Trasilien line J trains.
