= Rouen-Rive-Droite station =

Railway station in Rouen, France

Rouen-Rive-Droite
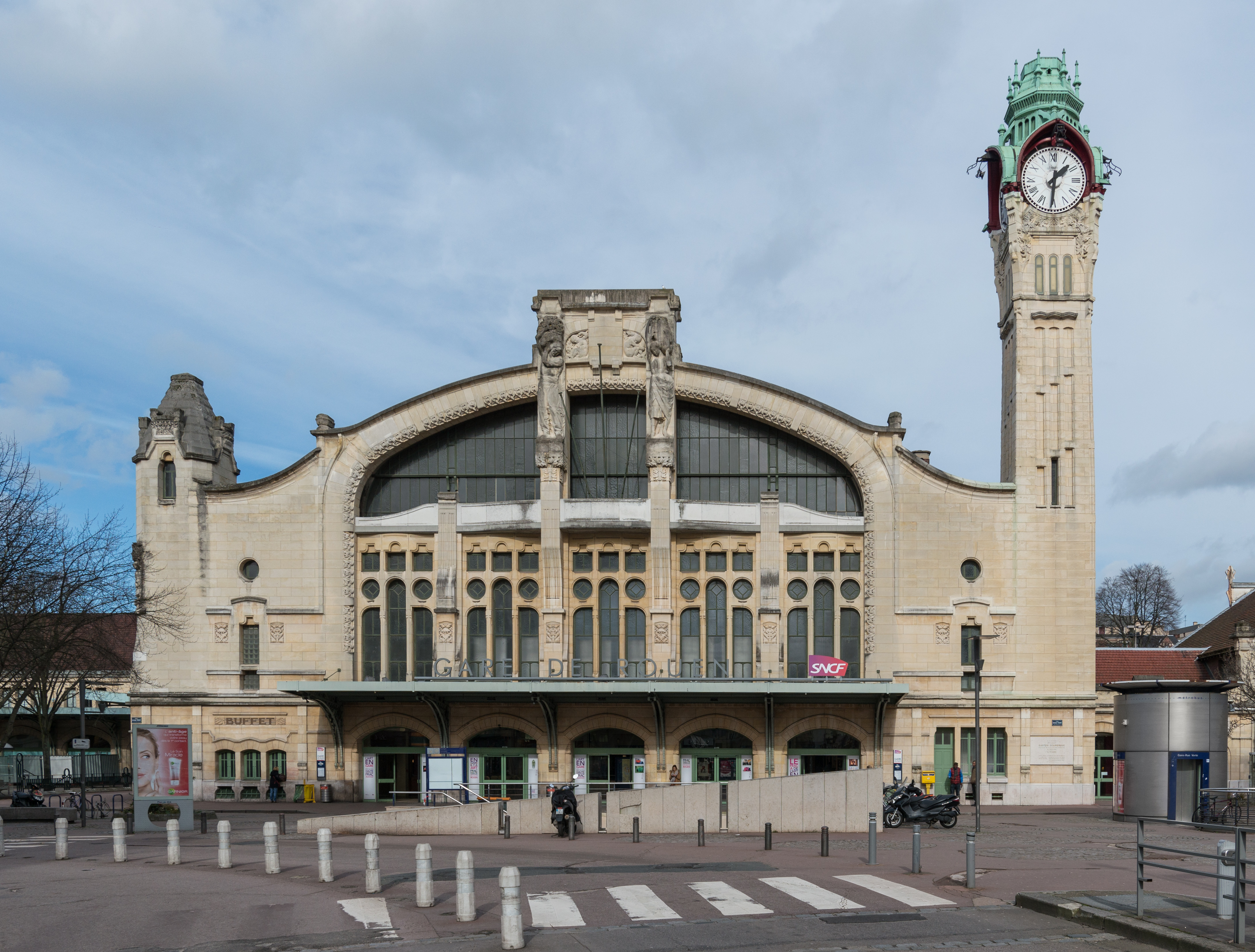

General information
- Location: Rouen, Normandy, France
- Coordinates: 49°26′56″N 1°5′38″E
- Lines: TGV; TER Normandie; TER Hauts-de-France
- Tracks: 8

Other information
- Station code: 87411017

History
- Opened: 1847

Passengers
- 2024: 7,773,267
Services
Preceding station	SNCF	Following station
Le Havre Terminus	TGV	Mantes-la-Jolie towards Marseille
Preceding station	TER Normandie	Following station
Paris-Saint-Lazare Terminus	Krono+	Yvetot towards Le Havre
Elbeuf-Saint-Aubin towards Caen	Krono	Terminus
Terminus	Krono	Montville towards Dieppe
Terminus	Citi	Oissel towards Paris-Saint-Lazare
Maromme towards Yvetot	Citi	Sotteville towards Elbeuf-Saint-Aubin
Elbeuf-Saint-Aubin towards Caen	Proxi	Terminus
Terminus	Proxi	Maromme towards Dieppe
Terminus	Proxi	Barentin towards Le Havre
Preceding station	TER Hauts-de-France	Following station
Morgny towards Lille-Flandres	Krono K45	Terminus
Morgny towards Amiens	Proxi P45	Terminus
Location

Rouen–Rive-Droite is a large railway station serving the city of Rouen, Normandy, France. The station is on Rue Verte in the north of the city. Services are mainly intercity but many services are local. There is also the TGV intercity service from Le Havre to Marseille-Saint-Charles.

== History ==
The station opened its doors in 1847 when the Rouen–Le Havre section of the Paris–Le Havre railway opened to service. The line previously had its terminus at Rouen Rive-Gauche. With the increase in traffic, the construction of the new station on the north bank of the River Seine started. The station building was designed in Art Nouveau style by architect Adolphe Dervaux, with commissioned sculpture by Camille Lefèvre. The station was inaugurated on 4 July 1928 by French President Gaston Doumergue. At first named Rue Verte, the station was later renamed as Rive-Droite. In 1994 an interchange was built to serve Rouen métro.

== Services ==
With the high-speed rail network TGV, Rouen is connected to the following stations:

- Le Havre–Rouen-Rive-Droite–Mantes-la-Jolie–Versailles-Chantiers–Massy–Lyon-Part-Dieu–Valence TGV–Avignon TGV–Marseille-Saint-Charles

The station is served by regional trains to Paris, Le Havre, Dieppe, Caen and Amiens.
