= Montivilliers =

- Commune
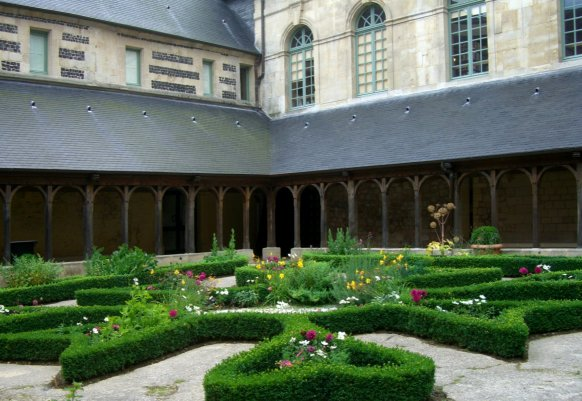
- The abbey cloisters

- Coat of arms
- Location of Montivilliers
- Location within France Location within Normandy
- Coordinates: 49°32′49″N 0°11′20″E
- Country: France
- Region: Normandy
- Department: Seine-Maritime
- Arrondissement: Le Havre
- Canton: Le Havre-2
- Intercommunality: Le Havre Seine Métropole

Government
  - Mayor (2026–32): Jérôme Dubost
- Area^{1}: 19.09 km^{2} (7.37 sq mi)
- Elevation: 8 m (26 ft)
- Highest elevation: 94 m (308 ft)
- Lowest elevation: 2 m (6.6 ft)
- Population (2023): 15,478
  - Density: 810.8/km^{2} (2,100/sq mi)
- Time zone: UTC+01:00 (CET)
  - Summer (DST): UTC+02:00 (CEST)
- INSEE/Postal code: 76447 /76290
- ^{1} French Land Register data, which excludes lakes, ponds, glaciers > 1 km^{2} (0.386 sq mi or 247 acres) and river estuaries.

Montivilliers (French pronunciation: [mɔ̃tivije] or [mɔ̃tivilje]) is a commune in the Seine-Maritime department in the Normandy region in northern France.

== Geography ==
A large light industrial and farming town by the banks of the river Lézarde in the Pays de Caux, situated just 4 miles (6.4 km) north of Le Havre, at the junction of the D489, D52, D926 and D31 roads.

== History ==
Pre-Roman archaeological discoveries include Bronze Age axes and jade jewelry. The old Roman road from here to Harfleur was destroyed by the English in 1415.
The Abbey Church of Notre-Dame, sometimes referred to as the Montivilliers Abbey dates back to 684, although it was destroyed by a Viking raid in 850, and rebuilt as a church in both the Romanesque and Gothic styles.

=== Heraldry ===
Arms of Montivilliers	The arms of Montivilliers are blazoned : Gules, a church argent, the door open, and the bell tower pierced of the field, topped with the head of a crozier Or, between 2 inescutcheons of France, and in base a lizard fesswise vert. (France=Azure, 3 fleurs-de-lys Or)

== Population ==
Historical population
Year	Pop.	±% p.a.
1968	8,910	—
1975	10,563	+2.46%
1982	15,030	+5.17%
1990	17,067	+1.60%
1999	16,556	−0.34%
2007	16,241	−0.24%
2012	16,243	+0.00%
2017	15,612	−0.79%
2023	15,478	−0.14%
Source: INSEE

== Places of interest ==
- The nineteenth-century chateau de Colmoulins.
- The church of St. Germain, dating from the fourteenth century.
- The abbey church of Notre-Dame, dating from the eleventh century.
- The abbey museum
- A Protestant church (1787)
- The medieval ramparts.
- The Arboretum du parc de Rouelles is an arboretum set within the Parc de Rouelles.

== People ==
- Isaac de Larrey (1639–1719), French historian was born in Montvilliers
- René Bihel, French footballer was born here in 1916.
- Arthur Good (1853–1928), French engineer, science educator, author, and caricaturist who wrote under the pen-name "Tom Tit".
- Sébastien Lepape, short track speed skater, born here in 1991.
- Lys Mousset, professional footballer for Bohemian F.C.
- Édouard Mendy, professional footballer for Chelsea F.C.
- Migouel Alfarela (born 1997), professional footballer.
- Jean Prévost, writer, lived here when his father was principal of a local school.

== Twin towns ==
- Nordhorn, Germany since 1963

== See also ==
- Communes of the Seine-Maritime department
