= Rolleville =

- Commune
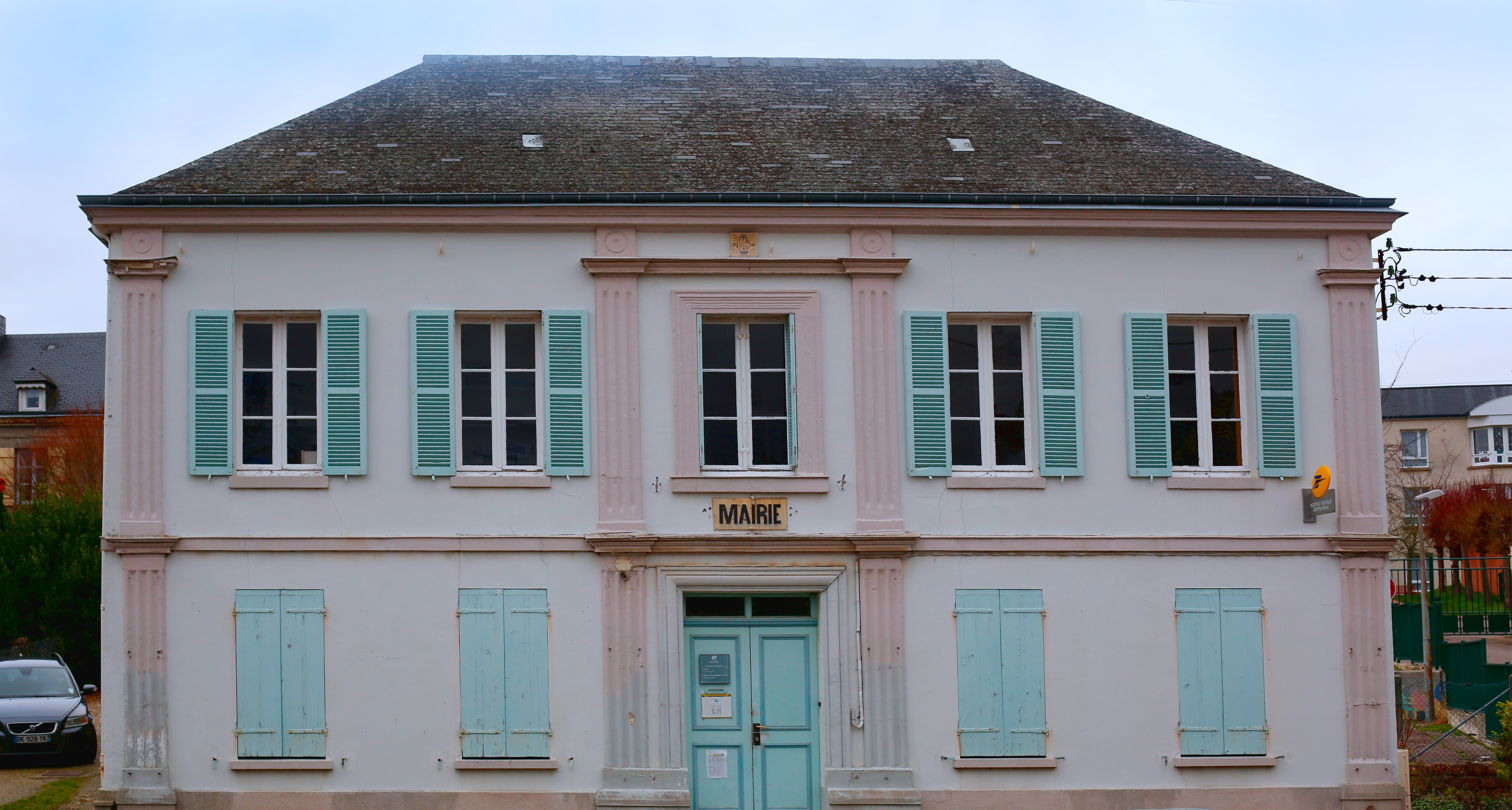
- The town hall in Rolleville

- Coat of arms
- Location of Rolleville
- Location within France Location within Normandy
- Coordinates: 49°35′00″N 0°12′43″E
- Country: France
- Region: Normandy
- Department: Seine-Maritime
- Arrondissement: Le Havre
- Canton: Octeville-sur-Mer
- Intercommunality: Le Havre Seine Métropole

Government
  - Mayor (2026–32): Pascal Leprettre
- Area^{1}: 7.06 km^{2} (2.73 sq mi)
- Elevation: 45 m (148 ft)
- Highest elevation: 107 m (351 ft)
- Lowest elevation: 27 m (89 ft)
- Population (2023): 1,209
  - Density: 171/km^{2} (444/sq mi)
- Time zone: UTC+01:00 (CET)
  - Summer (DST): UTC+02:00 (CEST)
- INSEE/Postal code: 76534 /76133
- ^{1} French Land Register data, which excludes lakes, ponds, glaciers > 1 km^{2} (0.386 sq mi or 247 acres) and river estuaries.

Rolleville (French pronunciation: [ʁɔlvil]) is a commune in the Seine-Maritime department in the Normandy region in northern France.

== Geography ==
A farming village with some light industry, by the banks of the river Lézarde in the Pays de Caux, situated some 10 miles (16 km) northeast of Le Havre, on the D32 road. SNCF has a TER railway station here.

== Heraldry ==
Arms of Rolleville	The arms of Rolleville are blazoned : Vert, on a bend sinister wavy between a dovecot argent and a garb of flax Or, 3 millwheels gules.

== Population ==
Historical population
Year	Pop.	±% p.a.
1968	910	—
1975	873	−0.59%
1982	1,022	+2.28%
1990	1,081	+0.70%
1999	1,131	+0.50%
2007	1,137	+0.07%
2012	1,130	−0.12%
2017	1,195	+1.12%
2023	1,209	+0.19%
Source: INSEE

== Places of interest ==
- The nineteenth-century church of St. Hilaire.
- A sixteenth-century manorhouse.

== See also ==
- Communes of the Seine-Maritime department
