= Carentan station =

Railway station in Normandy, France

Coordinates: 49°18′9″N 1°14′42″W

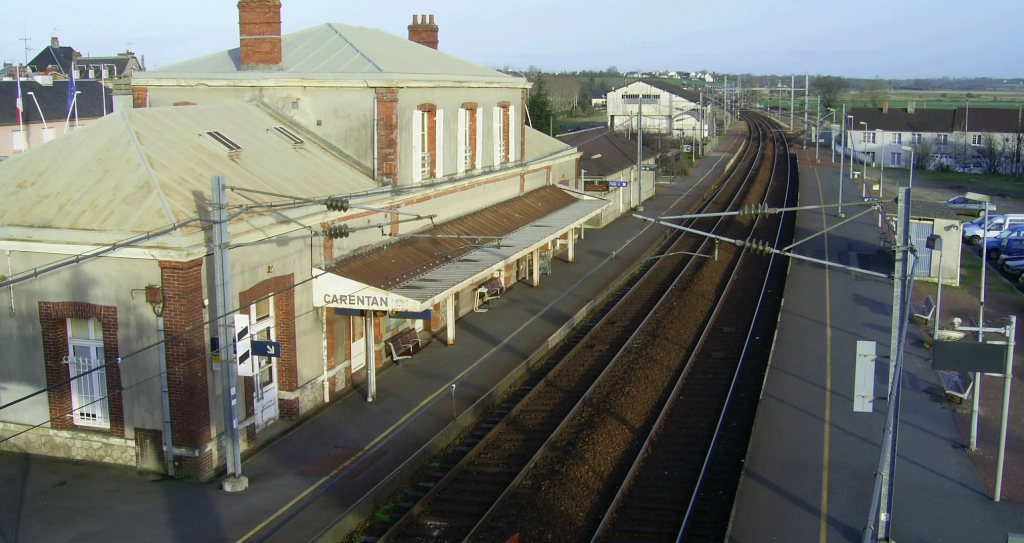
Carentan station in 2007

Gare de Carentan is a railway station serving the town Carentan, Manche department, Normandy, northwestern France.

It is situated on the Mantes-la-Jolie–Cherbourg railway.

== Services ==
The station is served by regional trains to Cherbourg, Caen and Paris.

Preceding station	TER Normandie	Following station
Lison towards Paris-Saint-Lazare	Krono+	Valognes towards Cherbourg
Lison towards Caen	Krono	Valognes towards Cherbourg
