= Compagnie du chemin de fer de Caen à la mer =

Railway company in France

The Compagnie du chemin de fer de Caen à la mer (French pronunciation: [kɔ̃paɲi dy ʃəmɛ̃ də fɛʁ də kɑ̃ a la mɛʁ], CM) was an early French railway company.

== History ==
The first railway to reach Caen, on 18 November 1855, was the Chemins de fer de l'Ouest's line from Paris (Gare Saint-Lazare) and Mantes-la-Jolie to Cherbourg. In the early part of the 19th century only the country's main cities and towns were favoured by a rail service, but by the 1850s the local authorities in Calvados were demanding that the département be served by additional local railways for the benefit of industry.

=== The line "from Caen to the sea" ===
The CM's line in Calvados was inaugurated on 30 June 1875 and originally ran for 16 km between stations at Caen Saint-Martin and Luc-sur-Mer.

In July 1876, the line was extended by 8 km from Luc-sur-Mer to Courseulles.

A 4-km-long connection between the CM and the Ouest company's main line in Caen was opened on 12 September 1877 and several intermediate stations – at La Folie, Malon, Le Cizey, and Épron – were opened to passengers.

All the company's tracks were 1,435 mm (4 ft 8 1/2 in) standard gauge; however in 1900 a third rail was laid between Luc-sur-Mer and Courseulles to allow through running to the latter town of 600-mm-gauge Chemins de fer du Calvados (CFC) trains operating from Caen via the CFC's Ouistreham to Luc-sur-Mer branch.

=== The beginning of difficulties ===
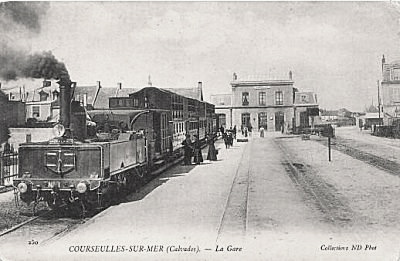
Gare de Courseulles.

The company makes a profit during the summer season, but most services stop during World War I, with only 3 return trips operating. After the Armistice, normal operation resumed and the company diversified its operations with a bus service to provide a corresponding bus to its trains.

The economic difficulties of the 1920s brought the first deficit in 1930, then 1931. The French Government took over operations on 23 March 1933. The line was modernised between 1937 and 1938. On 9 August 1937, the concession was ended and powers transferred to the Courriers Normands, who signed a contract with the newly created SNCF to have its track maintained by the nationalised railways. Omnibus services were then transferred to buses and trains mainly circulating during the Summer season.

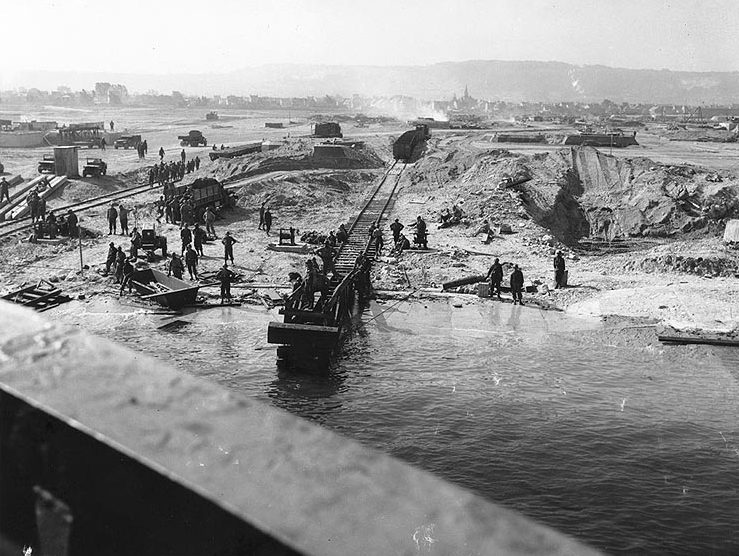
Engineers construct rail line on Juno beach in June 1944

The line was little touched for most of World War II and although a few tank movements deteriorated the tracks, the military did replace the damaged sections for use by military trains. This occurred during involvement of the railway in the Normandy Landings in 1944, when it became apparent that the docks at Cherbourg could not initially be used for the landing of railway equipment, due to mines and war damage. The proximity of the railway to the Juno landing beach offered the opportunity for a supply link inland, if the line could be repaired and provided with rolling stock. The British 181st Railway Operating Company, Royal Engineers (181 ROC RE) were tasked with putting locomotives and wagons into service which had been landed on the ‘Nan’ sector of Juno beach. They laid track across the beach to the existing line and soon re-instated a supplies service to Caen in co-operation with local railway staff.

Civilians were once again accepted on the one daily passenger train in 1944 and the company finally took back their network on 21 December 1944.

In 1945, traffic was six times less than it was in 1938, although twice what it was in 1943, and most passengers were war veterans who benefited from free public transport.

By 1950, rail service only ran during the summer and the decision to close the 28 km (17 mi) long branch line took into effect on 8 December 1950.

== Line openings ==
Date	Section	Length (km)
30 June 1875	Caen Saint-Martin - Luc-sur-Mer	16
July 1876	Luc-sur-Mer - Courseulles	8
12 September 1877	Caen Saint-Martin - CF de l'Ouest	4
1900	Luc-sur-Mer - Courseulles	Third rail installed

== Stations ==
The line ran from Caen to Courseulles and served the following towns and villages:

- Caen (station)
- Couvrechef
- Cambes
- Mathieu (station)
- Douvres-la-Délivrande (station)
- Chapelle-la-Délivrande
- Luc-sur-Mer (station)
- Langrune-sur-Mer (station)
- Saint Aubin-sur-Mer (station)
- Bernières-sur-Mer (station)
- Courseulles-sur-Mer (station)

== Rolling stock ==
The company possessed but a small fleet of steam locomotives; it was composed of four 0-6-0 engines built in 1875 by Fives-Lille specially for the line. A 0-6-0 Corpet-Louvet was received in 1883 to complete the fleet as well as 030-1392 of the Chemin de Fer de l'Ouest. Finally, a 0-6-0 St Léonard and a 0-6-0 Corpet Louvet built engines were received in 1927.

Passenger cars were Bidel wooden carriages of which twenty were double decker coaches, identical to those used on Réseau Saint-Lazare.

A few bogie carriages manufactured for the Chemin de fer de l'État for Paris-Courseulles direct services.

From 1924 the Chemin de Fer de Caen à la Mer equipped itself of DMUs. Their fleet of DMUs was composed of one Renault RS4 and four tyre Michelines. These were withdrawn in 1939.

Following the D-Day landings, four Andrew Barclay 0-4-0 diesel mechanical locomotives were landed on Juno beach for use on the Courseulles to Caen route.
