= Valognes station =

Railway station in northwestern France

Coordinates: 49°30′22″N 1°28′53″W

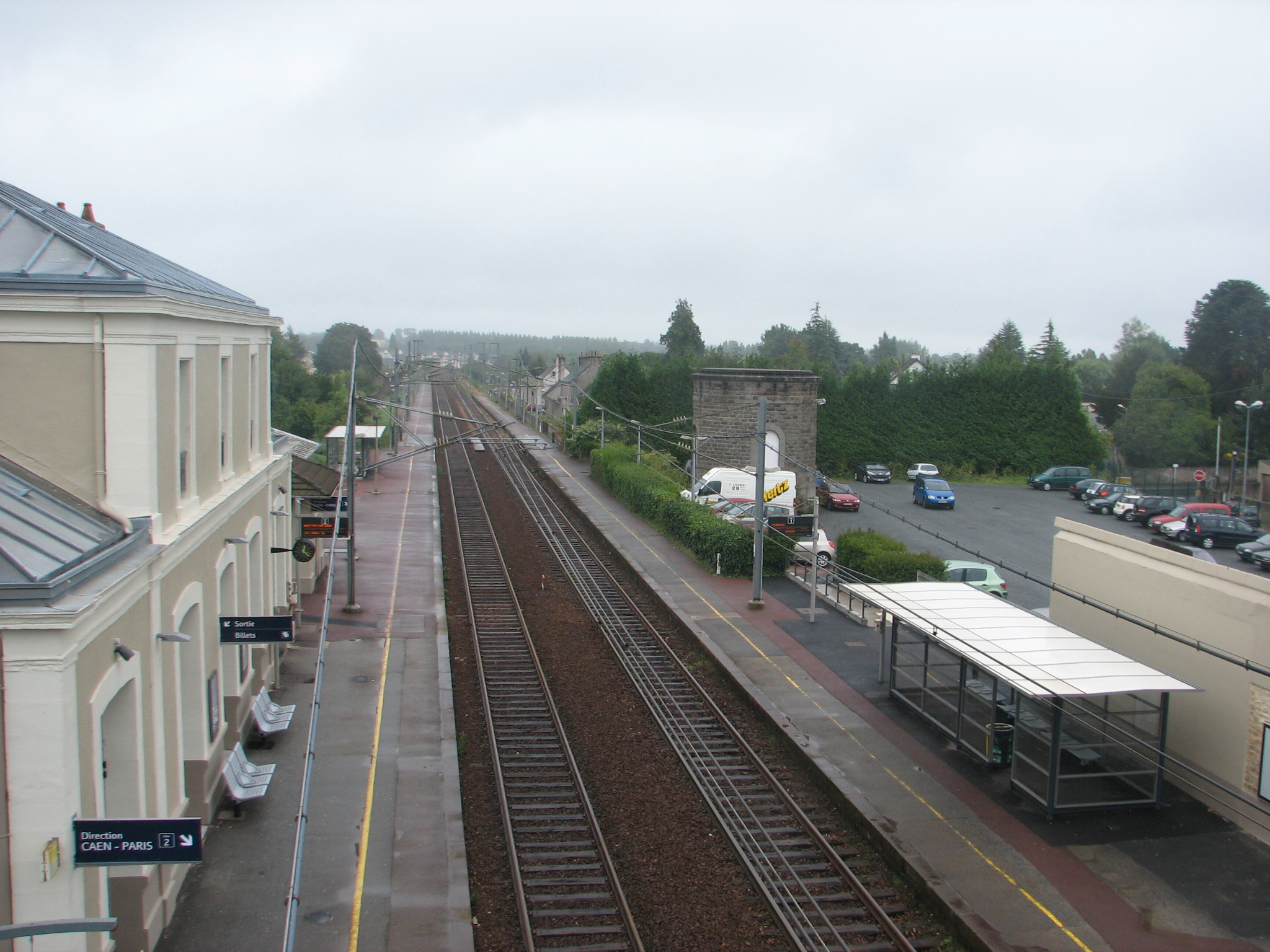
Valognes station

Gare de Valognes is a railway station serving the town Valognes, Manche department, northwestern France. It is situated on the Mantes-la-Jolie–Cherbourg railway.

== Services ==
The station is served by regional trains to Cherbourg, Caen and Paris.

Preceding station	TER Normandie	Following station
Carentan towards Paris-Saint-Lazare	Krono+	Cherbourg Terminus
Carentan towards Caen	Krono	Cherbourg Terminus
