= Tramway at Darvault =

Coordinates: 48.268953°N 2.741153°E

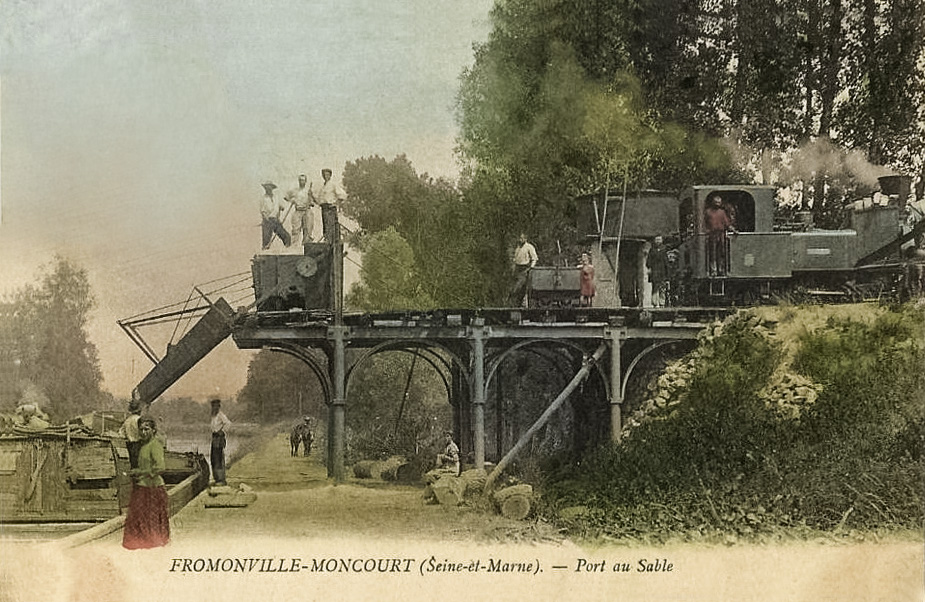
- Decauville locomotive Henriette at the Canal du Loing (Note: In this photo, the locomotive is standing behind a counterweight of a Decauville crane (600 mm gauge), ballasted with stones or wooden sleepers, of which only the end faces can be seen, covering part of the water box and chimney.)

Overview
- Native name: Voie ferrée de Sablières de Darvault

Technical
- Line length: Approx. 5.5 km (3.4 mi)
- Track gauge: 600 mm (1 ft 11 5/8 in)
Route map
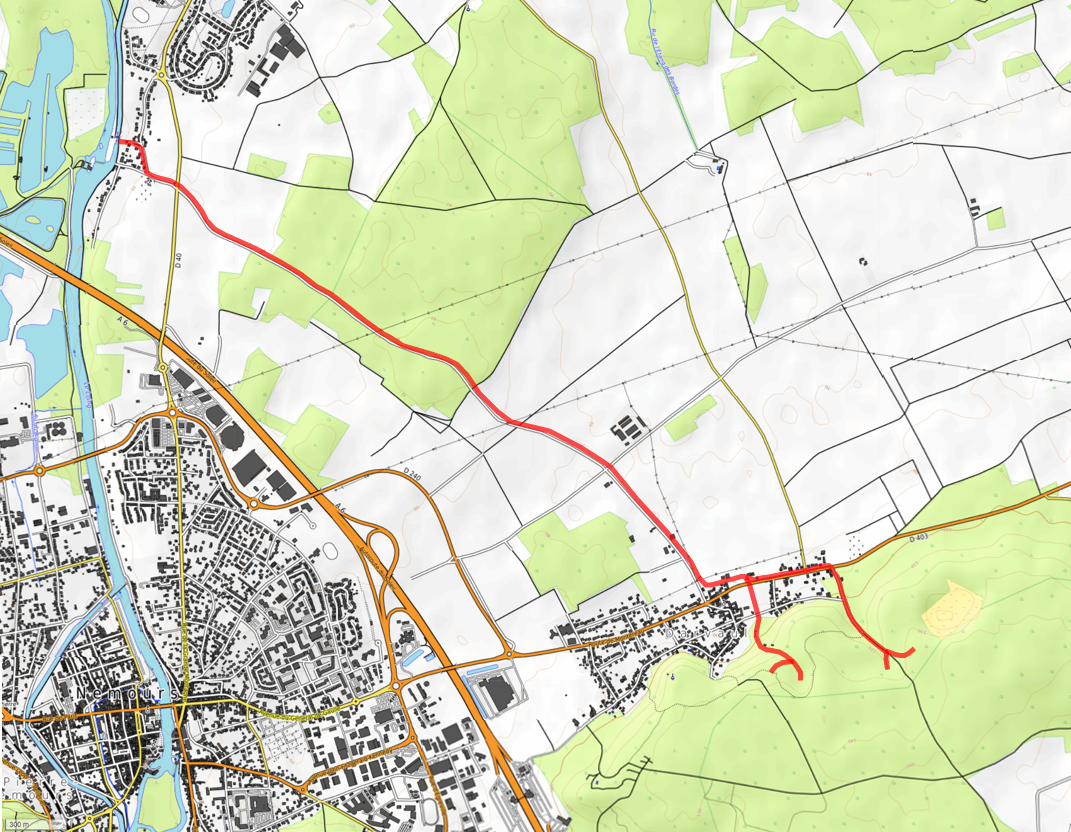
Former route of the tramway on a modern map

The Tramway at Darvault (French La voie ferrée Sablières de Darvault au Canal du Loing) was an approximately 5.5 km (3.4 mi) long narrow-gauge railway with a gauge of 600 mm (1 ft 11 5/8 in) from the sand pits at Darvault to the Canal du Loing at Montcourt-Fromonville in France.

== History ==
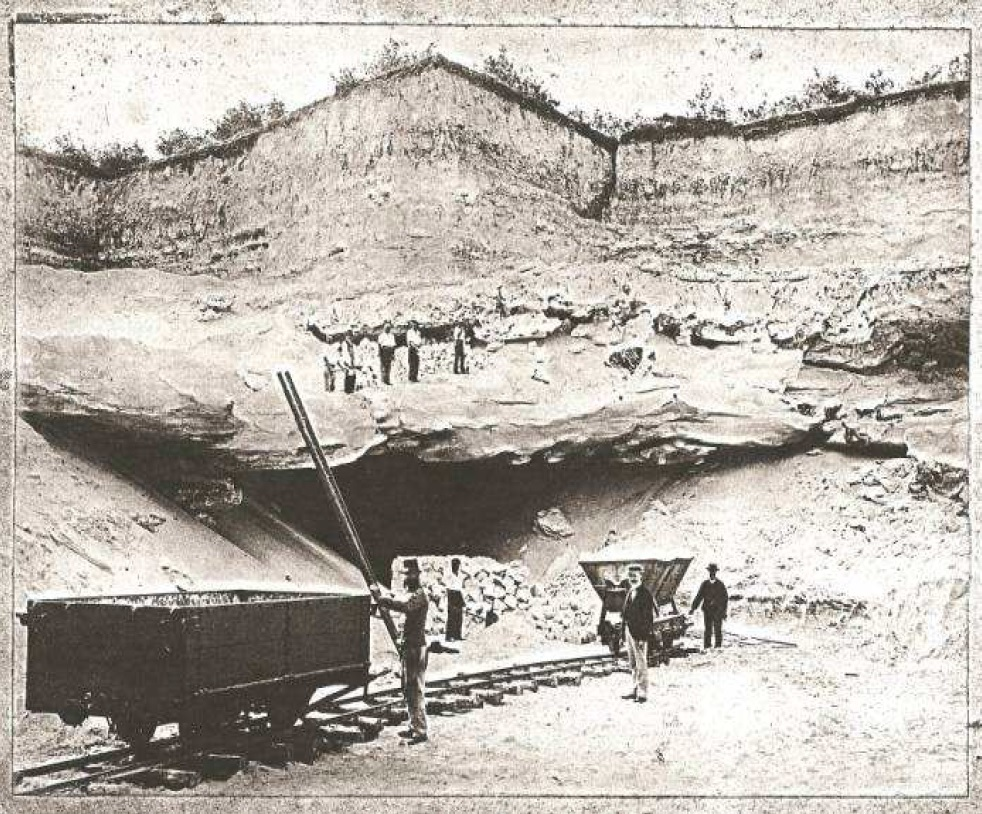
Decauville railway at the quarry of Darvault

The Darvault sandstone quarry has been exploited since 1885. Very high quality quartz glass can be produced from the dazzling white sand mined in the Arrondissement of Fontainebleau. It is mainly used for the production of crystal glass and optical glass, e.g. for the optical instruments of NASA. (Note: According to Ancien réseau des sablières de Darvault au canal du Loing, Philippe Lévêque and Daniel Tallet have mixed up the Tramway at Darvault with Tramway at Bourron.) (Note: According to RMF – Rail Miniature Flash. N° 436, July/August 2001. the Sablières de Darvault are a collapsing underground mine.)

Unlike the other sand pits in the region, where open-cast mining is practised, the Darvault quarry is partly underground. In 1891 Mrs Huot, the then owner of the site, applied for permission to build a narrow-gauge railway to transport sand between the quarries and the port of Fromonville on the Loing Canal. After Joseph Farisy and C. Besse became owners, they built the proposed railway in 1894. The tunnels were driven without systematic planning and without special safety structures, as the sand was only manually mined in small batches.

During the First World War, railway operations were suspended in 1914 and the tracks were dismantled for reuse on the Marne front. Until about 1936, transport was by horse-drawn carriage. The quarry was exhausted and abandoned before World War II.

== Locomotive ==
The locomotive was manufactured by Weidknecht and obtained its boiler certificate on 25 August 1891. It was then used by Decauville under the name of Hermanville for assessment, demonstration or hire on the Chemins de fer du Calvados. On 3 July 1893 it was sold to "C. Besse, Sablières, Darvault, S & M, France", where it was given the name Henriette. (Note: There existsts also an engraving of this or an otherwise unknown identical locomotive called Kleber.)

According to data published in the UK, the Type 10 locomotive, had a new price of £1136, an engine capacity of 9 7/8 inches × 12 1/2 inches (bore × stroke: 250 mm × 317.5 mm), a driving wheel diameter of 2 feet 1 1/2 inches (ø 650 mm) and a wheelbase of 4 feet 7 inches (1400 mm). It weighed 10 tonnes unloaded and 13 tonnes in working order.

Works-No.	Boiler test	Wheel arrangement	Gauge	Empty weight	Name	Operator
Decauville N° 128; Weidknecht N° 550/91	25 August 1891	0-6-2	600 mm (1 ft 11 5/8 in)	10 t	Hermanville (also known as Kleber) and later Henriette	Chemins de fer du Calvados, later Tramway at Darvault
