= Luc-sur-Mer station =

Railway station in Luc-sur-Mer, France

Coordinates: 49°19′0.5″N 0°21′28″W

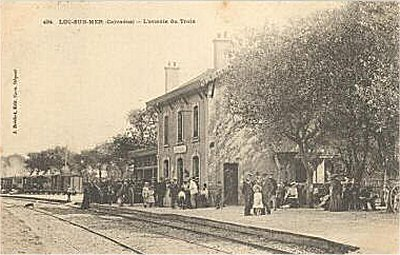
Gare de Luc-sur-Mer.

Luc-sur-Mer was a railway station in Luc-sur-Mer on the Caen à la mer railway and opened on 30 June 1875. In July 1876, the line was extended from Luc to Courseulles-sur-Mer.

The line from Luc to Courseulles was double in 1900 with the addition of a third 600 mm (1 ft 11 5/8 in) rail for trains of the Chemins de fer du Calvados. The station closed in 1952. The station was situated near to Avenue Carnot (current name) where the narrow gauge line split, and went towards Ouistreham.
