= Courseulles-sur-Mer station =

Railway station in Normandy, France

Coordinates: 49°20′5″N 0°27′27″W

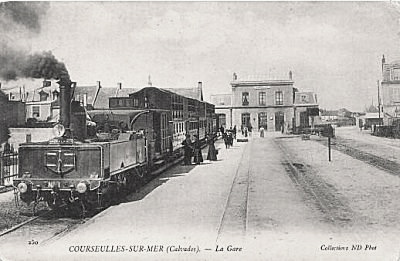
Gare de Courseulles-sur-Mer.

Courseulles was a railway station in Courseulles-sur-Mer at the end of the CF Caen-Mer, terminus of trains from Caen and Luc-sur-Mer.

The station and extension of the line opened in July 1876 and doubling of the track with the addition of a third rail for 600 mm (1 ft 11 5/8 in) gauge trains (Chemins de fer du Calvados) in 1900. The station closed in 1952.

The station was situated Place du 6 Juin (current name) next to the Hôtel de Paris and the fishing harbour on the Seulles. the standard gauge railway ended whilst the 600 mm gauge line continued to Bayeux.
