= Tramway at Bourron =

Coordinates: 48.3394°N 2.6789°E

Overview
- Native name: Réseau des Sablières de Bourron au Canal du Loing

Technical
- Line length: 6 km (3.7 mi)
- Track gauge: 600 mm (1 ft 11 5/8 in)
Route map
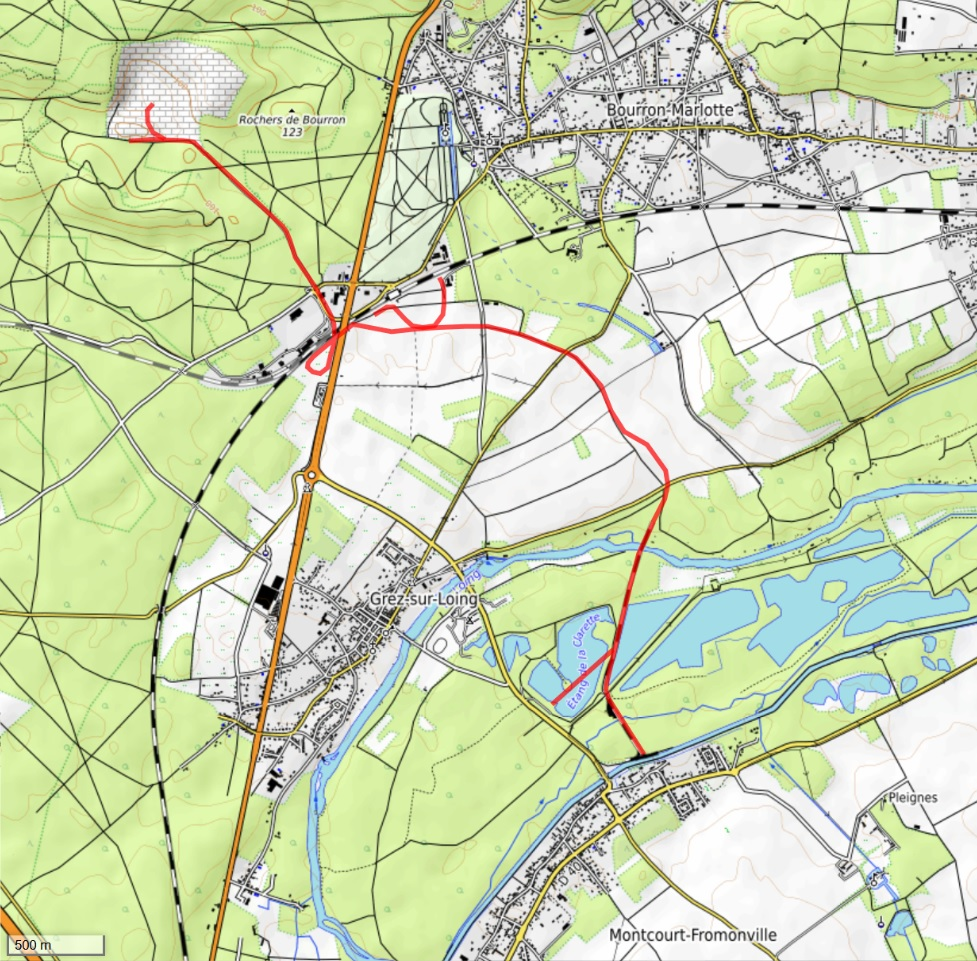
Route of the track from the Sablières de Bourron to the Canal du Loing around 1950 superimposed onto a modern map

The Tramway at Bourron (French Réseau des Sablières de Bourron au Canal du Loing) was a 6 km (3.7 mi) long 600 mm (1 ft 11 5/8 in) gauge railway that ran from the sand pits at Bourron-Marlotte via the Bourron-Marlotte – Grez railway station to the Canal du Loing opposite to Montcourt-Fromonville in France.

== History ==
The Société des Sandlières de Bourron was founded in 1911 to exploit the Bourron sand pits, located in the Forest of Fontainebleau, west of the village of Bourron-Marlotte and north of the Bourron-Marlotte – Grez railway station. Very high quality quartz glass can be produced from the dazzling white sand mined in the Arrondissement of Fontainebleau. It is mainly used for the production of crystal glass and optical glass, e.g. for the optical instruments of NASA. (Note: According to Ancien réseau des sablières de Darvault au canal du Loing, Philippe Lévêque and Daniel Tallet have mixed up the Tramway at Bourron with the Tramway at Darvault.) (Note: According to RMF – Rail Miniature Flash. N° 436, July/August 2001. the Sablières de Darvault are a collapsing underground mine.)

Shortly after the company was founded, the narrow-gauge line was built from the sand pit with a bridge over the 1,435 mm (4 ft 8 1/2 in) standard gauge railway tracks of the PLM to its station. The line was extended in 1913 over an iron truss bridge to the Canal du Loing near Montcourt-Fromonville, where bulk goods could be transported more cheaply than by rail.

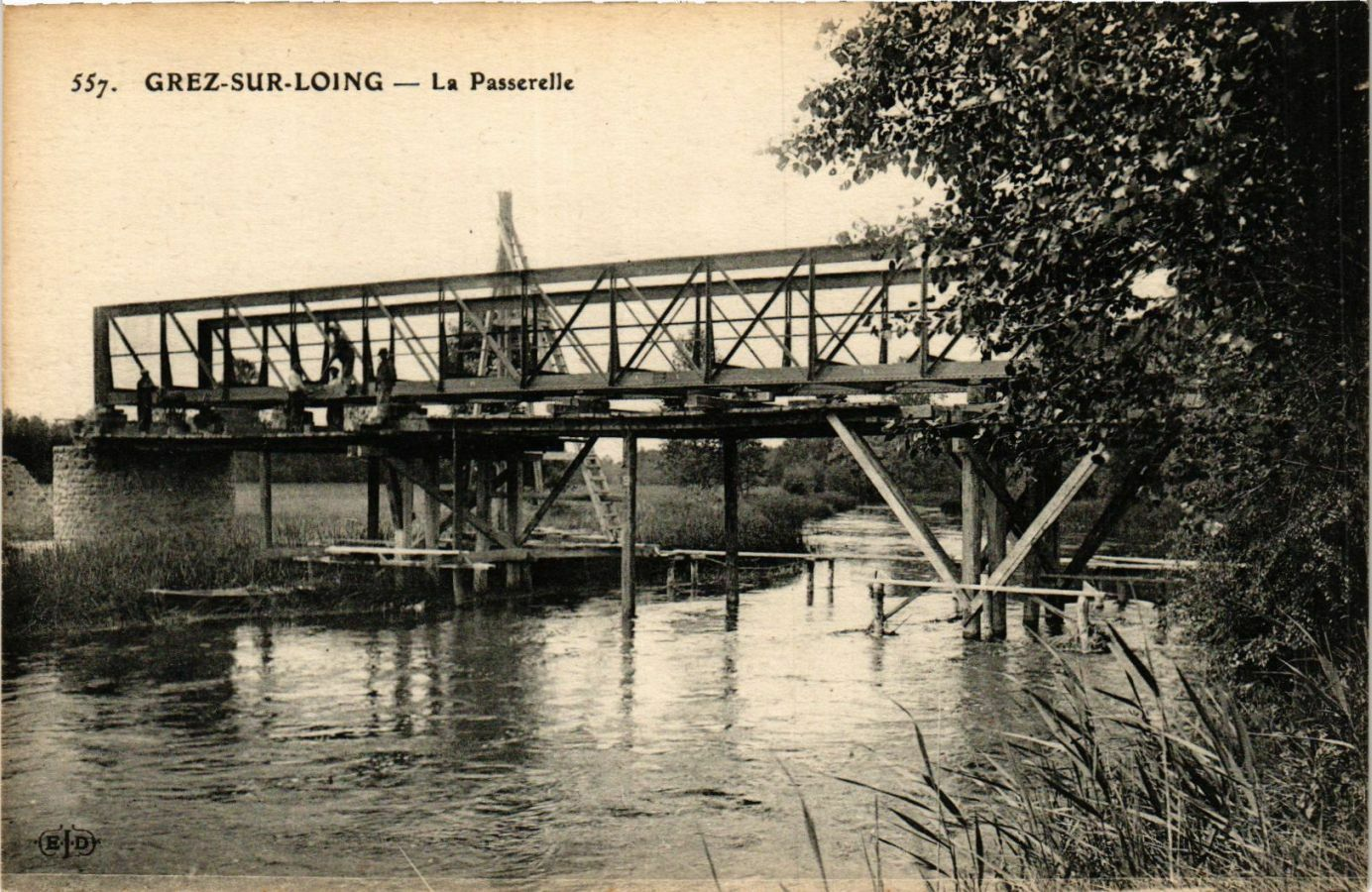
Grez-sur-Loing - La Passerelle

Philippe Lévêque and Daniel Tallet described the light railway line in the following words:

English Translation	French Original
"Full of bucolic nooks and crannies, this line led to a number of picturesque places, including a viaduct with metal beams over the Loing, over which the small locomotives would run puffing, against the backdrop of a 17th-century watermill."	« Pleine de recoins bucoliques, cette ligne menait à bon nombre d´endroits pittoresques dont un viaduc à poutrelles métalliques sur le Loing que les petites locomotives franchissaient haletantes, sur fond de moulin à eau du XVIIe siècle. »

Commercial goods transport on the narrow-gauge railway was discontinued in 1969. These days, the sand pits are operated by Sibelco with the help of lorries. Part of the line is used as a museum railway under the name Tacot des Lacs.

== Locomotives ==
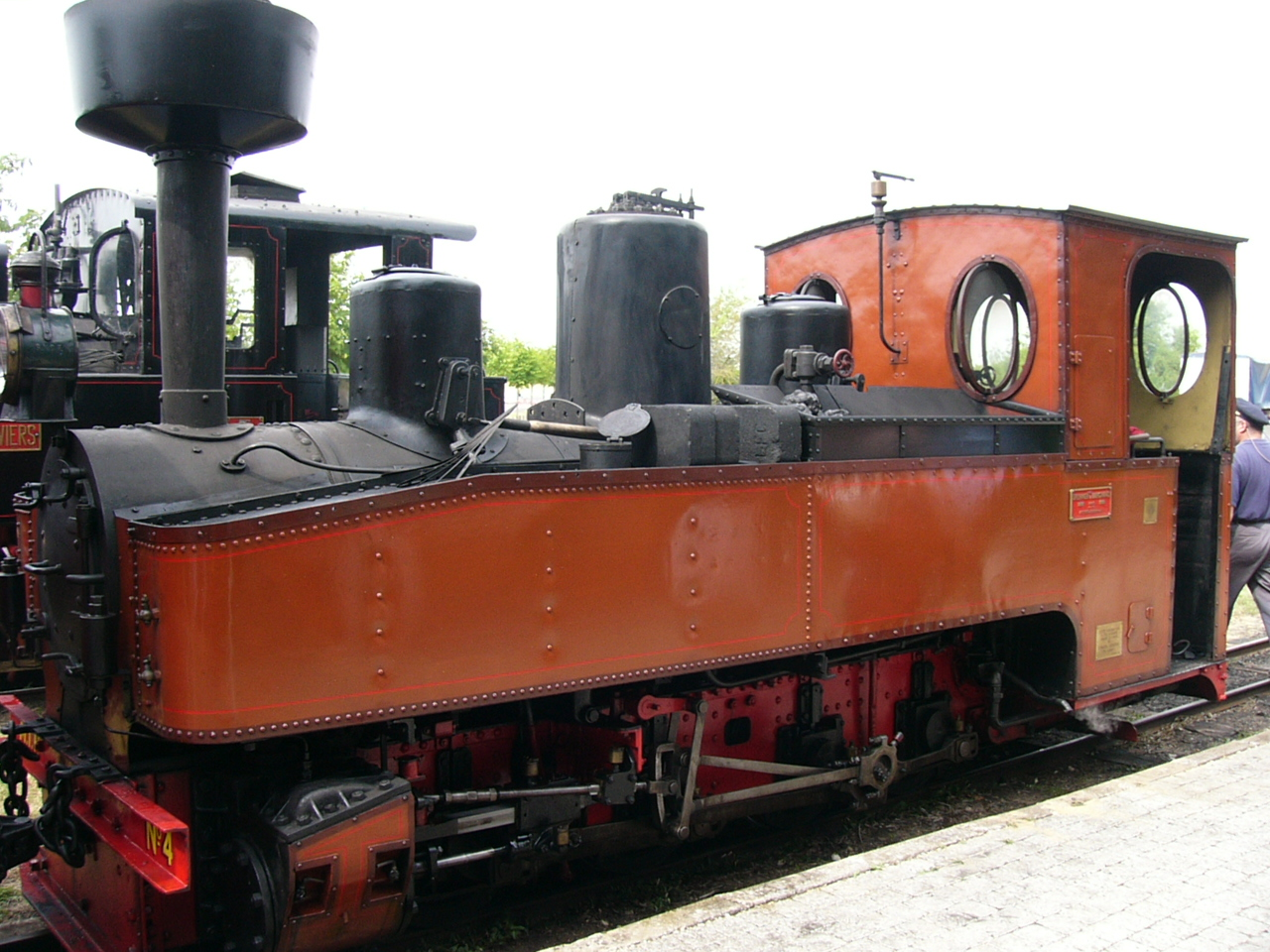
Henschel No. 15311

Up to twelve 0-4-0 Henschel steam locomotives were used on the line from 1920 to 1959. One of them is preserved at the Chambon de Nemours company and one, No. 15311, at the Pithiviers Transport Museum. At the end of the commercial railway operation, six T75 Billard diesel locomotives were used instead. Two of them are preserved, one on the P'tit Train de Saint-Trojan-les-Bains in Saint-Trojan-les-Bains and one on the Froissy Dompierre Light Railway.
