= Frénouville–Cagny station =

Railway station in Frénouville, France

Frénouville–Cagny
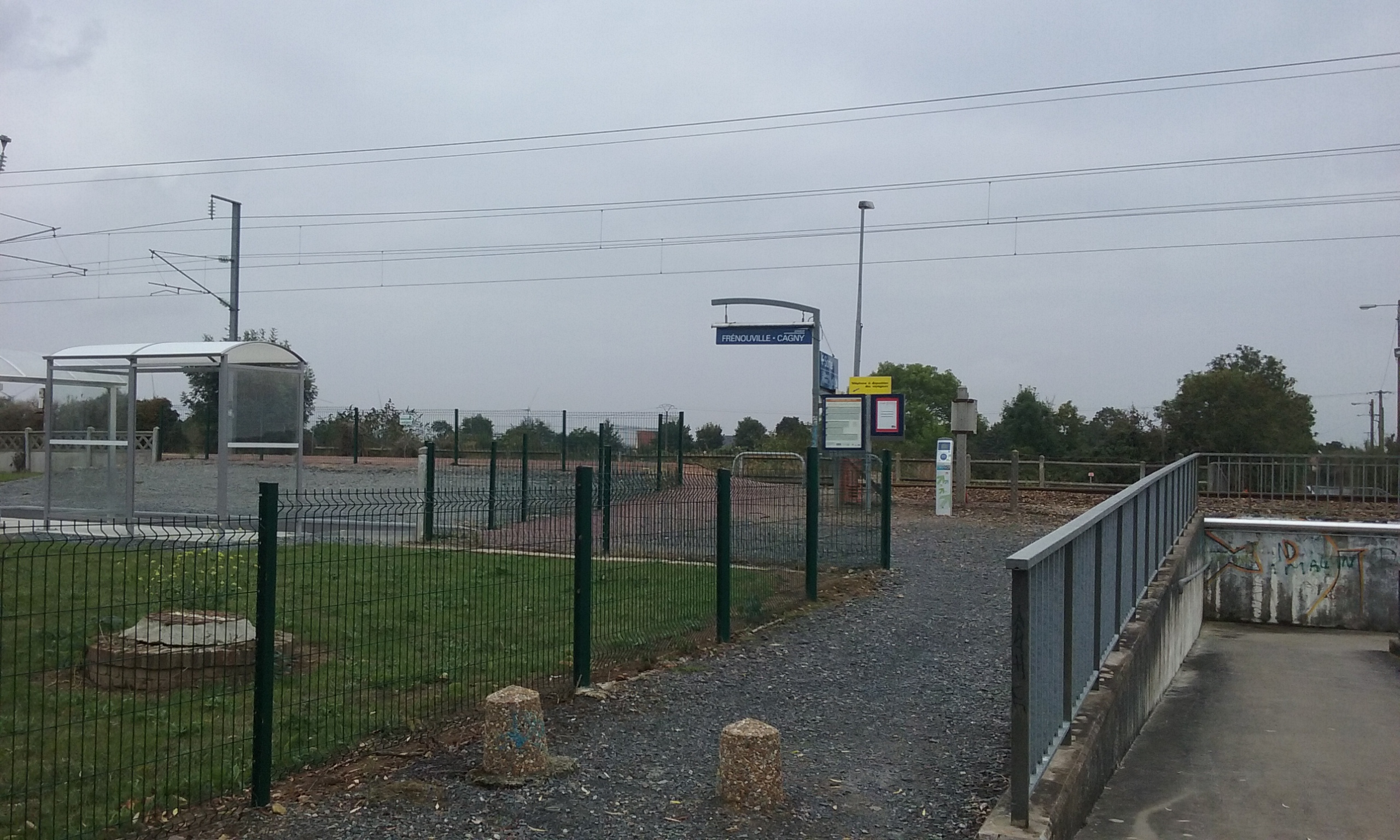
- South entrance of Frénouville-Cagny railway station

General information
- Location: Frénouville, Calvados; France
- Coordinates: 49.1411°N 0.2603°W

Other information
- Station code: 87444182

Services
Preceding station	TER Normandie	Following station
Caen Terminus	Citi	Moult-Argences towards Lisieux
Location

Frénouville–Cagny is a train station located in Frénouville, Calvados, Normandy, France.

== Location ==
The station is at the border between Frénouville and Cagny, on the Mantes-la-Jolie to Cherbourg railway.

== Service ==
Frénouville-Cagny station is served by regular trains to Caen and to Lisieux, and once a day by a train to Évreux and to Cherbourg.

Bus Verts du Calvados line 116 also serves the station, with buses toward Mézidon and Caen.
