= Frénouville =

- Commune
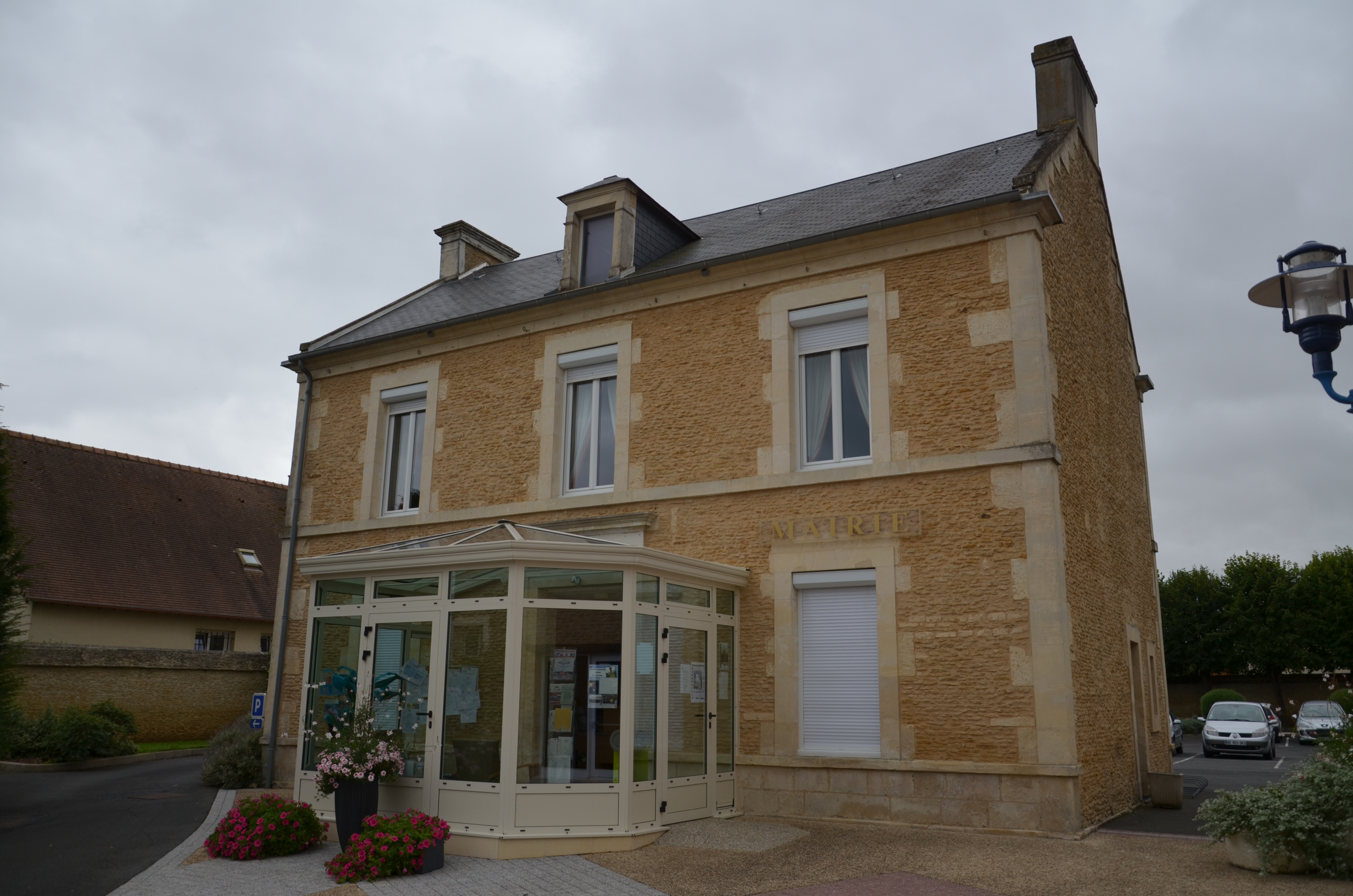
- The town hall in Frénouville

- Coat of arms
- Location of Frénouville
- Location within France Location within Normandy
- Coordinates: 49°08′16″N 0°14′35″W
- Country: France
- Region: Normandy
- Department: Calvados
- Arrondissement: Caen
- Canton: Troarn
- Intercommunality: CC Val ès Dunes

Government
  - Mayor (2020–2026): Alain Porquet
- Area^{1}: 6.45 km^{2} (2.49 sq mi)
- Elevation: 15 m (49 ft)
- Highest elevation: 47 m (154 ft)
- Lowest elevation: 9 m (30 ft)
- Population (2023): 2,050
  - Density: 318/km^{2} (823/sq mi)
- Time zone: UTC+01:00 (CET)
  - Summer (DST): UTC+02:00 (CEST)
- INSEE/Postal code: 14287 /14630
- ^{1} French Land Register data, which excludes lakes, ponds, glaciers > 1 km^{2} (0.386 sq mi or 247 acres) and river estuaries.

Frénouville (French pronunciation: [fʁenuvil]) is a commune in the Calvados department in the Normandy region in northwestern France. Frénouville-Cagny station has rail connections to Caen and Lisieux.

== Geography ==
The commune is made up of the following collection of villages and hamlets, Le Poirier, Le Boulhoullay, La Tourelle and Frénouville.

== Population ==
Historical population
Year	Pop.	±% p.a.
1968	741	—
1975	938	+3.43%
1982	1,124	+2.62%
1990	1,266	+1.50%
1999	1,478	+1.74%
2007	1,609	+1.07%
2012	1,867	+3.02%
2017	1,948	+0.85%
2023	2,050	+0.85%
Source: INSEE

== Transport ==
Frénouville–Cagny station is a train station on the Mantes-la-Jolie–Cherbourg railway line.

== Notable people ==
- Louise Boitard (1907 – 2001), also known as Jeanine Boitard and Jeanine Gille, was a member of the French Resistance during the Second World War and is buried here.

== See also ==
- Communes of the Calvados department
