= Louise Boitard =

French politician

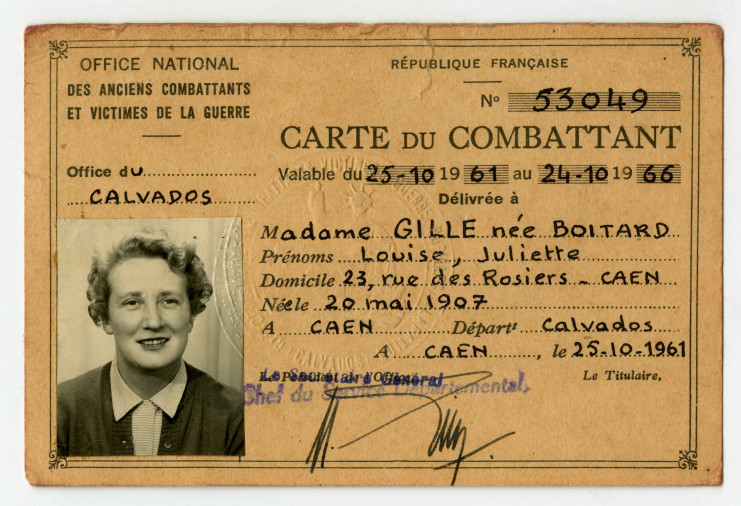
- Louise Boitard - Carte du Combattant
- Born: 20 May 1907; Caen
- Died: 4 April 2001 (aged 93); Caen
- Resting place: Frénouville
- Other names: Jeanine Boitard, Jeanine Gille
- Occupations: School teacher, Politician, French Resistance fighter
- Organization: French Resistance
- Spouse: Leonard Gille
- Awards: Legion of Honour, Croix de Guerre 1939–1945, Resistance Medal, Ordre de la Santé publique & Righteous Among the Nations

Louise Boitard (20 May 1907 – 4 April 2001), also known as Jeanine Boitard and Jeanine Gille, was a member of the French Resistance during the Second World War. Later a local politician, she was one of France's most decorated women.

== Career in the Resistance ==
Boitard, the daughter of a wine merchant, joined the Resistance in 1941, becoming known by the code name "Jeanine". She helped many people to escape from occupied France. In October 1943, she hid two small Jewish children at a farm near Lisieux. In 1944, during the invasion of Normandy, she rescued a Canadian airman, Jack Verbout, and hid him in her home. A character based on Jeanine appeared in the film The Longest Day, played by Irina Demick. When the film was released in 1962, she travelled to Chicago to meet Verbout again.

== Post-war activity ==
Immediately after the war, she married Léonard Gille, a lawyer and Resistance worker whose secretary she had been since 1940. She was a board member of the weekly publication Liberté de Normandie. In 1945, she went to Sweden to work with childcare experts, subsequently setting up several crèches to support families separated by the war.

On 18 April 1971, Jeanine Gille became the first woman to sit on the conseil général of Calvados, in succession to her husband, who had died two months earlier. She was re-elected in 1973, but defeated by eight votes in 1979.

in 2001, Yad Vashem awarded Janine Gille the title of Righteous Among the Nations.

She was buried beside her husband in the cemetery at Poirier, in the commune of Frénouville, east of Caen. In 2015, the "square Jeanine Boitard" was named after her, in the Saint-Paul district of Caen.

== In popular culture ==
Boitard is portrayed (under the misspelled name "Janine Boitard") in the war film The Longest Day (1962). She is played by Irina Demick.
