= Caen Saint-Martin station =

Railway station in Caen, France

Coordinates: 49°11′9″N 0°22′20″W

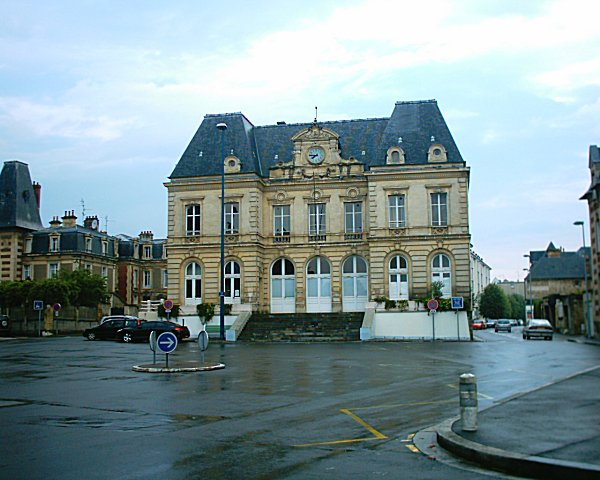
Gare Saint Martin, Caen

Saint Martin was the main station on the CF Caen-Mer and the terminus of the line for trains from Courseulles and Luc-sur-Mer.

== History ==
The station and line opened on 30 June 1875, with a spur linking it to the CF de l'Ouest opened on 12 September 1877. The station closed in 1951, after a few years closure during 1945, after World War II and an extensive utilisation for the transport of military supplies.

In early July 1938, a permanent platform with a ticket office was established near the junction between the main line and the connection, at the top of Avenue de Creully.

Saint Martin station was situated on Caen's Place du Canada and the building is still present.

== See also ==
- Caen (Ouest/ETAT, SNCF)
