= Saint-Lô station =

Railway station in Saint-Lô, France

Coordinates: 49°7′1″N 1°6′0″W

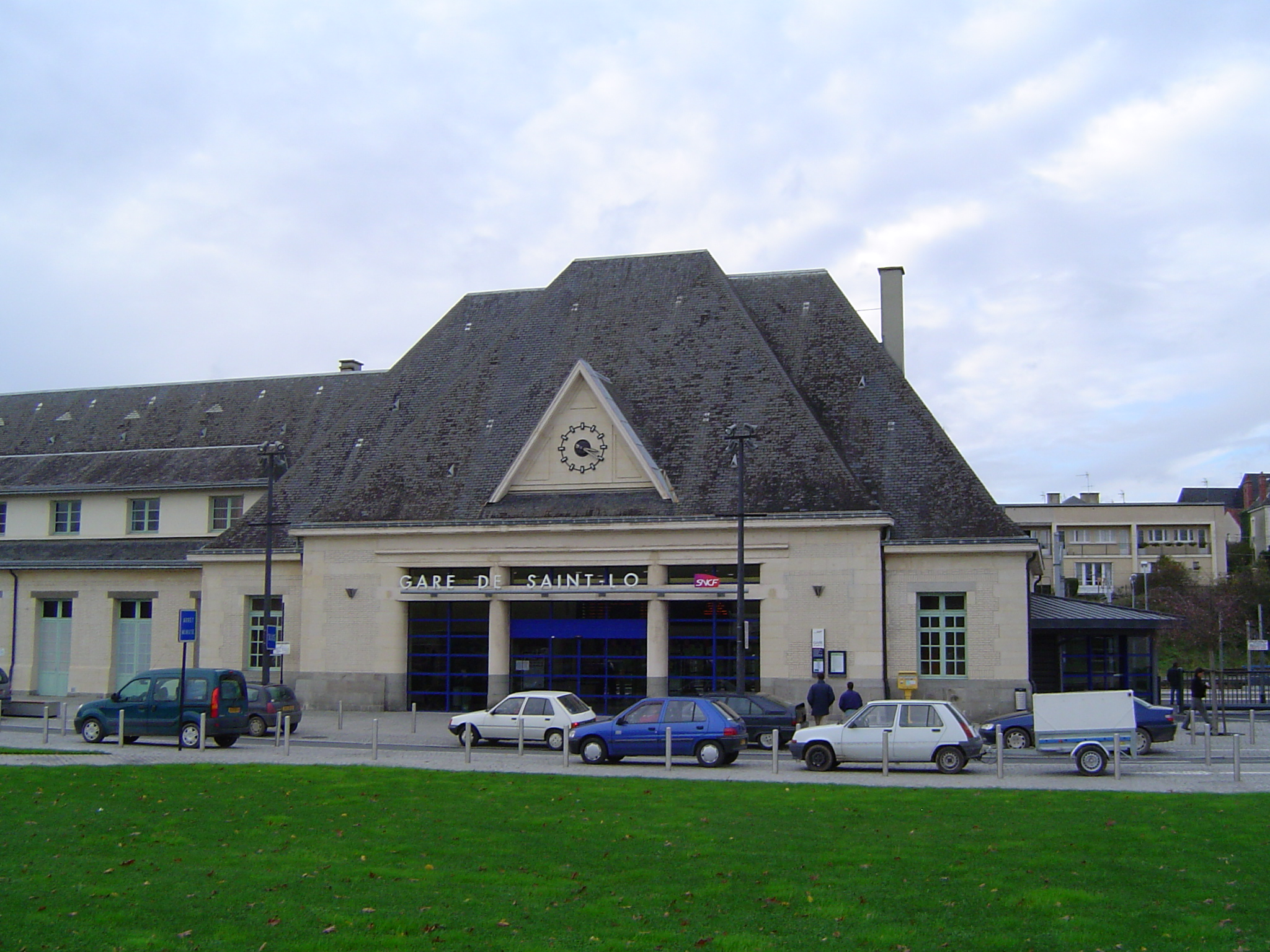
Station entrance

Gare de Saint-Lô is a railway station serving the town Saint-Lô, Manche department, Normandy, northwestern France.

It is situated on the Lison–Lamballe railway. On the Railplanner app (EUrail) the station is listed as St-Lô (France).

== World War II bombardment ==
During the Normandy Campaign, Allied bombing in the Battle of Saint-Lô focused on the railroad station for its strategic importance.

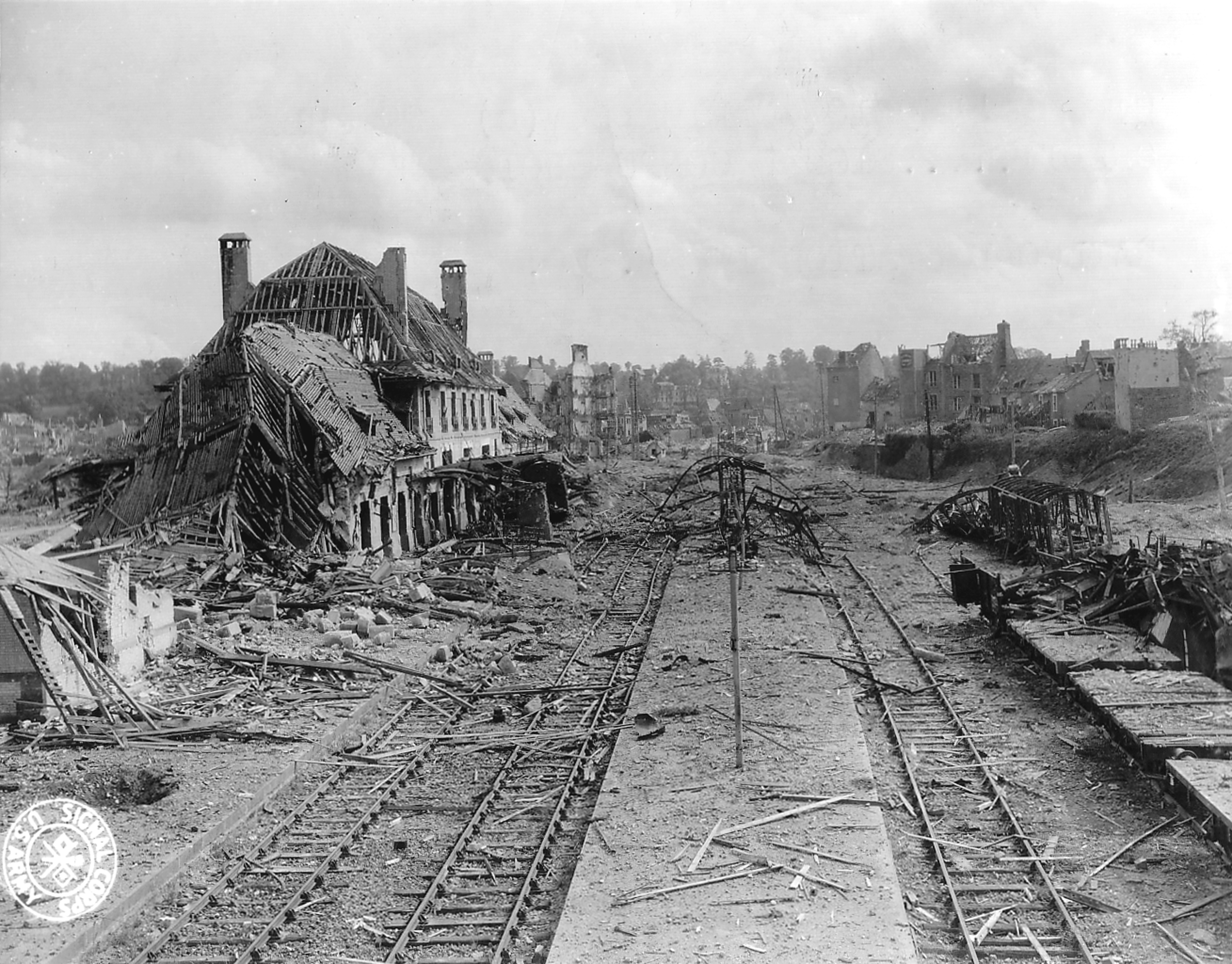
Ruins of the Saint-Lô station after American bombing

== Services ==
The station is served by local trains between Caen and Granville.

Preceding station	TER Normandie	Following station
Lison towards Caen	Citi	Coutances towards Granville
