= Cherbourg station =

Railway station in Normandy, France

Cherbourg
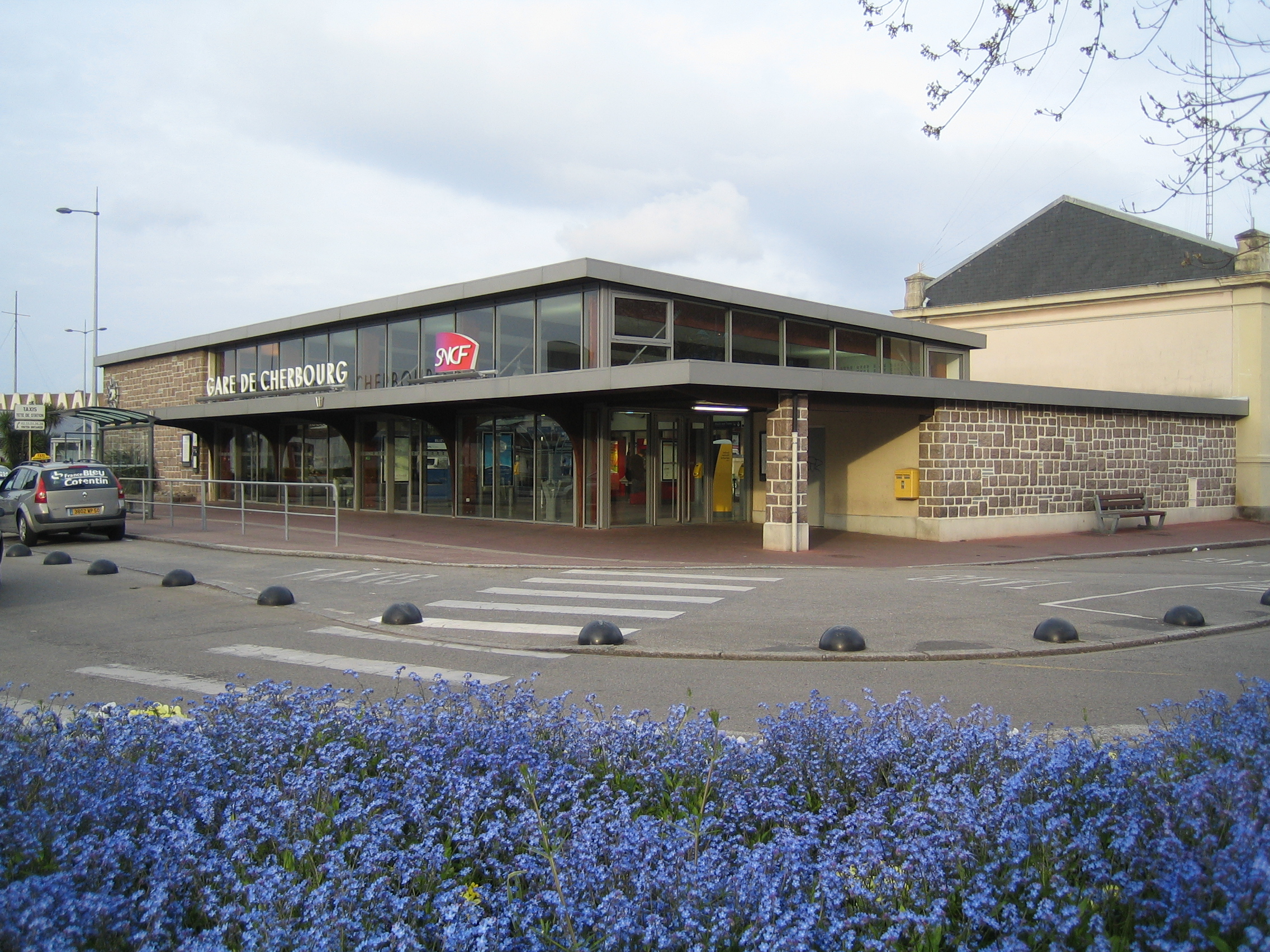

General information
- Location: Cherbourg, Manche, Normandy, France
- Coordinates: 49°38′00″N 1°37′17″W
- Line: Mantes-la-Jolie–Cherbourg railway

Other information
- Station code: 87444877
Location

Gare de Cherbourg is the railway station of the city of Cherbourg, Normandy, France. It is the western terminus of the Mantes-la-Jolie–Cherbourg railway.

== History ==
On 5 September 1850, the president Louis-Napoléon Bonaparte visited Cherbourg and demanded the continuation of work on the Arsenal. He also demanded the construction of a railway line linking Cherbourg to Paris. The construction of the line was approved in 1852. The station was opened on 4 August 1858 by Napoleon III who arrived on the imperial train from Paris.

At the time of opening, the trip to Paris took ten hours and cost 22.85 FrF for a third class ticket and 41.55 FrF for a first class ticket.

Queen Victoria visited the city and its station the same day and took part in the grandiose celebrations. The third dock of the Cherbourg Arsenal, 1,200,000m³ in size, was opened and a steam ship immediately sailed from it.

At the end of the day, a statue of Napoleon I on a horse by Armand Le Véel was unveiled.

== Services ==
Cherbourg station is served by regional trains to Lison, Caen and Paris.

Preceding station	TER Normandie	Following station
Valognes towards Paris-Saint-Lazare	Krono+	Terminus
Valognes towards Caen	Krono	Terminus

	Ferry Connections	
Terminus	Irish Ferries; Ferry	Dublin Port
Terminus	Stena Line; Ferry	Rosslare Europort
Terminus	Brittany Ferries; Ferry	Poole
