= Tramway de Pithiviers à Toury =

Coordinates: 48°10′29.15″N 2°14′36.68″E

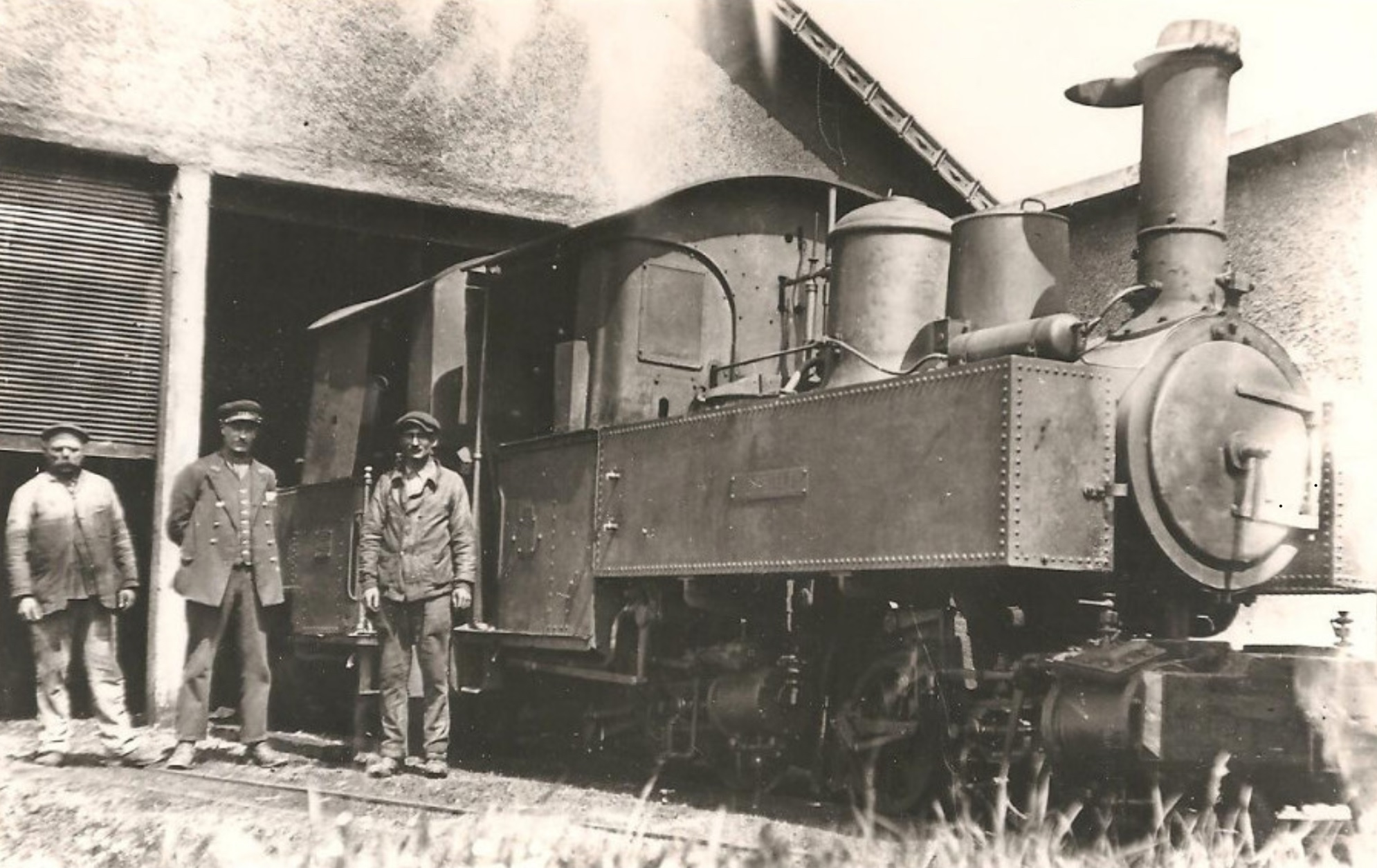
- Decauville locomotive No. 135 or 136
- Locale: France

Commercial operations
- Built by: Société Decauville
- Original gauge: 600 mm (1 ft 11 5/8 in)

Preserved operations
- Operated by: Association du Musée des Transports de Pithiviers
- Length: 4 kilometres (2.5 mi)
- Preserved gauge: 600 mm (1 ft 11 5/8 in)

Commercial history
- Opened: 1892
- Closed: 1965

Preservation history
- 1966: 3.5 kilometres (2.2 mi) line from Pithiviers re-opened

The Tramway de Pithiviers à Toury (French pronunciation: [tʁamwɛ də pitivje a tuʁi], TPT) was a 600 mm (1 ft 11 5/8 in) gauge railway in the Loiret department of France. It was built to carry sugar beet and was 80 kilometres (50 mi) long.

== History ==
Pithiviers and Toury are 31 kilometres (19 mi) apart, and sugar beet is a major agricultural product in the area. The Chemin de fer de Paris à Orléans passed through Toury. In 1892, the Société Decauville took a 15-year concession to build and operate a light railway linking Pithiviers and the surrounding villages to Toury.

There were sugar refineries at Pithiviers and Toury, and the line connected these. The route of the railway generally followed local roads. The line opened on 25 July 1892. The failure of the Société Decauville in 1898 meant that the operation of the TPT was taken over by the department on 1 January 1899 and later by the Ponts et Chaussees on 29 March 1901.

Traffic grew steadily until the Second World War. A railcar was introduced in 1922, and another followed in 1926, followed by two more acquired second-hand from the Chemins de fer du Calvados in 1937. After the war, traffic declined due to better roads in the area and increase in private vehicle ownership. The passenger service was withdrawn in 1951 but freight ran until 31 December 1964, with a final enthusiasts special running on 22 May 1965. However, this was not to be the end of the TPT.

== Preservation ==
The Association du Musée des Transports de Pithiviers (AMTP) was formed to preserve at least part of the line. It was agreed that Pithiviers would be suitable as there was a depot and workshops there. The 3.5 kilometres (2.2 mi) of roadside line to Ormes was saved, with an extension of one-half kilometre (0.3 mi) to Bellébat being built to take the terminus away from the busy road. The preserved line reopened on 23 April 1966.

== Rolling stock ==
The TPT operated the following rolling stock.

=== Steam locomotives ===
The TPT had a unique numbering system for its locomotives. The first figure denoted the number of driven axles, and the second figure denoted the individual locomotive number within that classification.

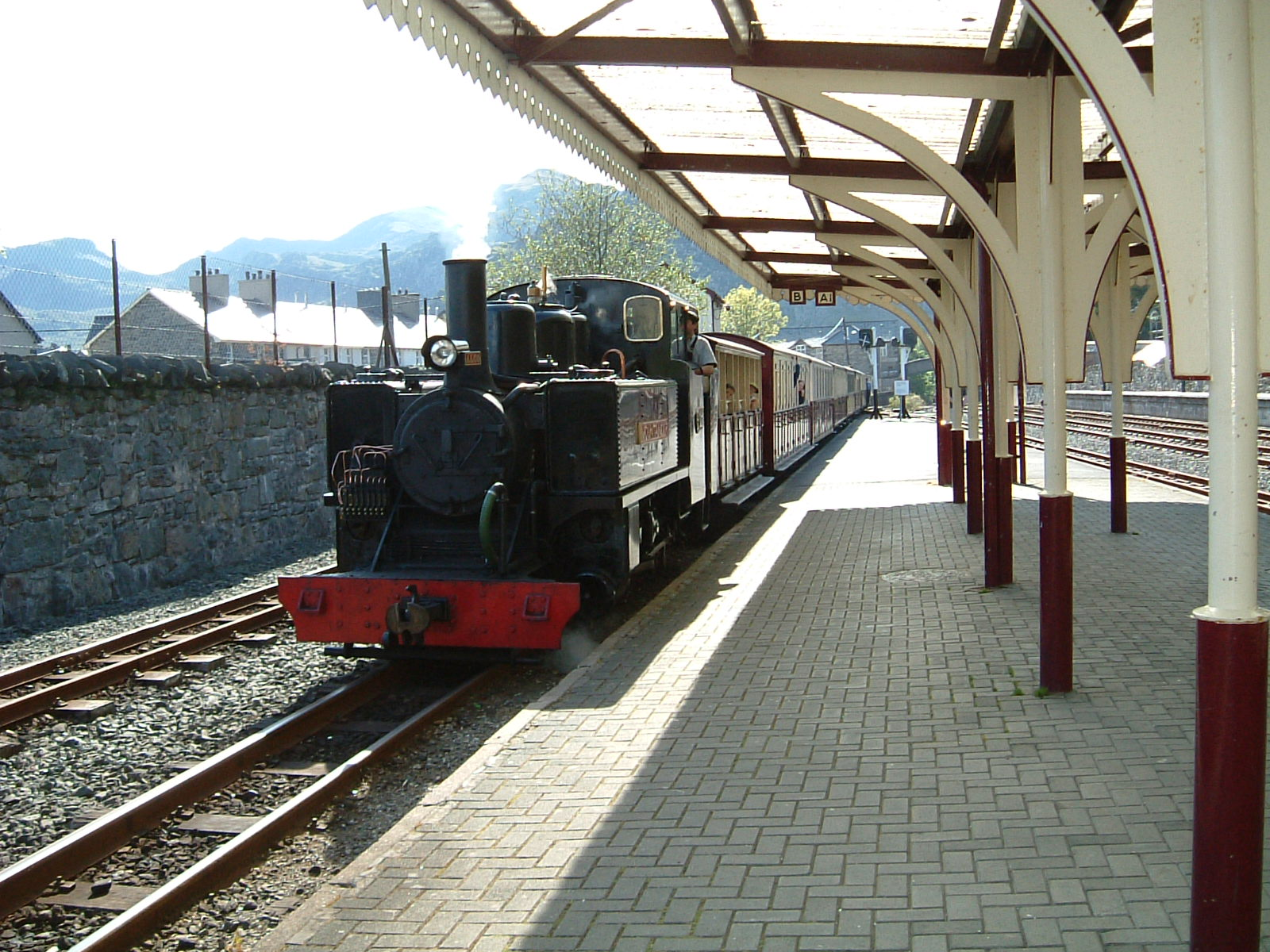
Mountaineer, ex TPT 3-23, on the Ffestiniog Railway and rebuilt for its loading gauge

- 2-1 Decauville 0-4-2T (189/94 ), "Ormes"
- 2-2 Decauville 0-4-2T (184/93 ), "Outarville"
- 3-1 Decauville 0-6-0T (393/03), "Torville"
- 3-2 Decauville 0-6-0T (476/08), "Izy"
- 3-3 Decauville 0-6-0T (592/10), "Brandelon"
- 3-4 Decauville 0-6-0T built 1901. "Decauville"
- 3-5 Blanc-Misseron 0-6-0T built 1902.
- 3-6 Hunslet 4-6-0T (1274/1917), ex War Department (WD) No.362 acquired in 1927, numbered 3-6 in 1930. Renumbered 3-11 in 1934.
- 3-6 (2) Orenstein & Koppel, 0-6-0T,(8083/15), preserved on the Cappy-Froissy-Dompierre railway.
- 3-10 Hunslet 4-6-0T works number 1238/1916, ex War Department WD no 328 and Société de Pithiviers le Vieil. To TPT in 1933 and then Râperie de Lécluse in 1947 and Société Anonyme des Chemins de Fer à Voie de 60 du Pas de Calais, Vis-en-Artois in 1945, scrapped 1958.
- 3-11 Hunslet 4-6-0T, WD 362, ex no. 3-6 renumbered. Scrapped at Pithiviers in 1957.
- 3-20 ALCO 2-6-2T,(57148/16), WD 1257 preserved on the Cappy-Froissy-Dompierre railway.
- 3-21 ALCO 2-6-2T, (57092/16), WD 1201
- 3-22 ALCO 2-6-2T, (57131/16), WD 1240 preserved by AMTP.
- 3-23 ALCO 2-6-2T, (57156/16), WD 1265. Preserved on the Ffestiniog Railway as Mountaineer.
- 4-1 0-8-0Humboldt, DFB 883
- 4-2 0-8-0 Schwarkopf, DFB 1986
- 4-3 0-8-0 Henschel, DFB 1746
- 4-4 0-8-0 Krauss, DFB 2031
- 4-5 0-8-0 Henschel, DFB 1531
- 4-10 Franco-Belge (2839/44) 0-8-0, converted to 0-8-0T by TPT.
- 4-11 Franco-Belge (2838/44) 0-8-0, converted to 0-8-0T by TPT.
- 4-12 Franco-Belge (2843/44) 0-8-0, converted to 0-8-0T by TPT. Preserved by AMTP
- 4-13 Franco-Belge (2844/44) 0-8-0, converted to 0-8-0T by TPT. Preserved by Arvo
- 4-14 Franco-Belge (2836/44) 0-8-0, ex Sucrerie Ternynck, Coucy-le-Château, spares source. Now preserved on the Froissy Dompierre Light Railway.
- 4-15 Franco-Belge (2825/44) 0-8-0, ex Sucrerie Ternynck, Coucy-le-Château, spares source.
- 5-1 Borsig 0-10-0T.
- 5-2 Schwartzkopff 0-10-0T.
- 5-3 Orenstein & Koppel 0-10-0T works number 8285/1917, ex sucrerie Pithiviers le Vieil, preserved on the Cappy-Froissy-Dompierre railway.

==== Mallet ====
- 22-1 Orenstein & Koppel 0-4-4-0T Mallet.
- 22-2 Decauville 0-4-4-0T Mallet, works number 110/1891, ex Chemins de fer du Calvados #7 Grandcamp, acquired second-hand in 1929.
- 22-3 Decauville 0-4-4-0T Mallet.
- 22-4Decauville 0-4-4-0T Mallet.
- 22-5 Orenstein & Koppel 0-4-4-0T Mallet. Works number 1769/1905. To Chemin de Fer Touristique et du Montagne. Now preserved at Chemin de Fer Touristique du Haut Rhône, Montalieu, near Lyon.
- 22-6 Orenstein & Koppel 0-4-4-0T Mallet.
- 22-7 Orenstein & Koppel 0-4-4-0T Mallet.
- 33-1 Decauville 0-6-6-0TT (6009/1915) Mallet built 1916 and acquired in 1923.

==== Early locomotives ====
Other early locomotives include these Decauville designed 0-4-2Ts and 0-6-2Ts:

- Outarville, 0-4-2T built by Weidknecht, works number 574/1892, later renamed Lutece.
- Outarville(2), 0-4-2T built by Decauville 184/93
- Bazoches, 0-4-2T built by Decauville, works number 176/1893.
- Outarville, 0-4-2T built by Decauville, works number 189/1893.
- Torville, 0-6-2T built by Decauville, works number 393/1903.
- Izy, 0-6-2T built by Decauville, works number 476/1907.

=== Railcars ===
The TPT had four railcars.

- AT 1 Crochat petrol-electric railcar, built 1922. Preserved by AMTP
- AT 2 Franco-Belge petrol-mechanical railcar, built 1927.
- AT 3 Decauville bogie railcar built 1924, transferred from the Chemins de fer du Calvados in 1944. In 1952 transferred to Cap Ferret (body rebuilt), then Chemin de fer touristique de Meyzieu (Rhône), actually on "Tramway touristique de Saint Trojan" (Ile d'Oléron).
- AT 4 Decauville bogie railcar built 1924, transferred from the Chemins de fer du Calvados in 1944.

=== Passenger stock ===
Six Decauville type IS bogie coaches were supplied when the line opened. Five were rebuilt between 1931 and 1939 and carried numbers V1-V5. A sixth was built in 1942 to a similar design and numbered V6. This carriage is now preserved by AMTP. Three fourgons were also used.

=== Freight stock ===
The TPT had a large amount of freight stock, mostly open wagons but also some covered vans and cattle wagons. Decauville supplied the initial stock, but later the workshops at Pithiviers produced wagins for the system.

== AMTP rolling stock ==
The AMTP operates, or has operated the following stock:-

=== 600 mm (1 ft 11 5/8 in) narrow gauge ===
- 3-5, 3-22 and 4-12 ex TPT, as above.
- Decauville Type Progrès 0-6-0T, ex Toury sugar refinery.
- Couillet 0-6-0T (1576/1910), ex Maizy sugar refinery No. 1, later transferred to the Chemin de Fer Touristique du Tarn, regauged to 50 cm.
- Blanc Misseron 0-6-0T, 1902, ex Paramé-Rothéneuf
- Schneider 0-4-0T built 1870.
- Decauville 0-4-0T built 1905.
- Decauville 0-4-0T built 1919.
- La Meuse 2-6-0T built 1938, ex Maizy sugar refinery N°9.
- Alco 2-6-2T, TPT 3-22
- Decauville Type Royan 0-6-2T, built 1902.
- Henschel 0-8-0T built 1917.
- Hartmann 0-8-0T built 1918.
- Franco-Belge 0-8-0T TPT 4-12
- Crochat railcar ex TPT, as above.

=== Metre gauge ===
- Cail 2-6-0T built 1895, ex Chemins de Fer des Charentes.
