= Caen station =

SNCF railway station serving Caen, France

Coordinates: 49°10′35″N 0°20′52″W

Caen
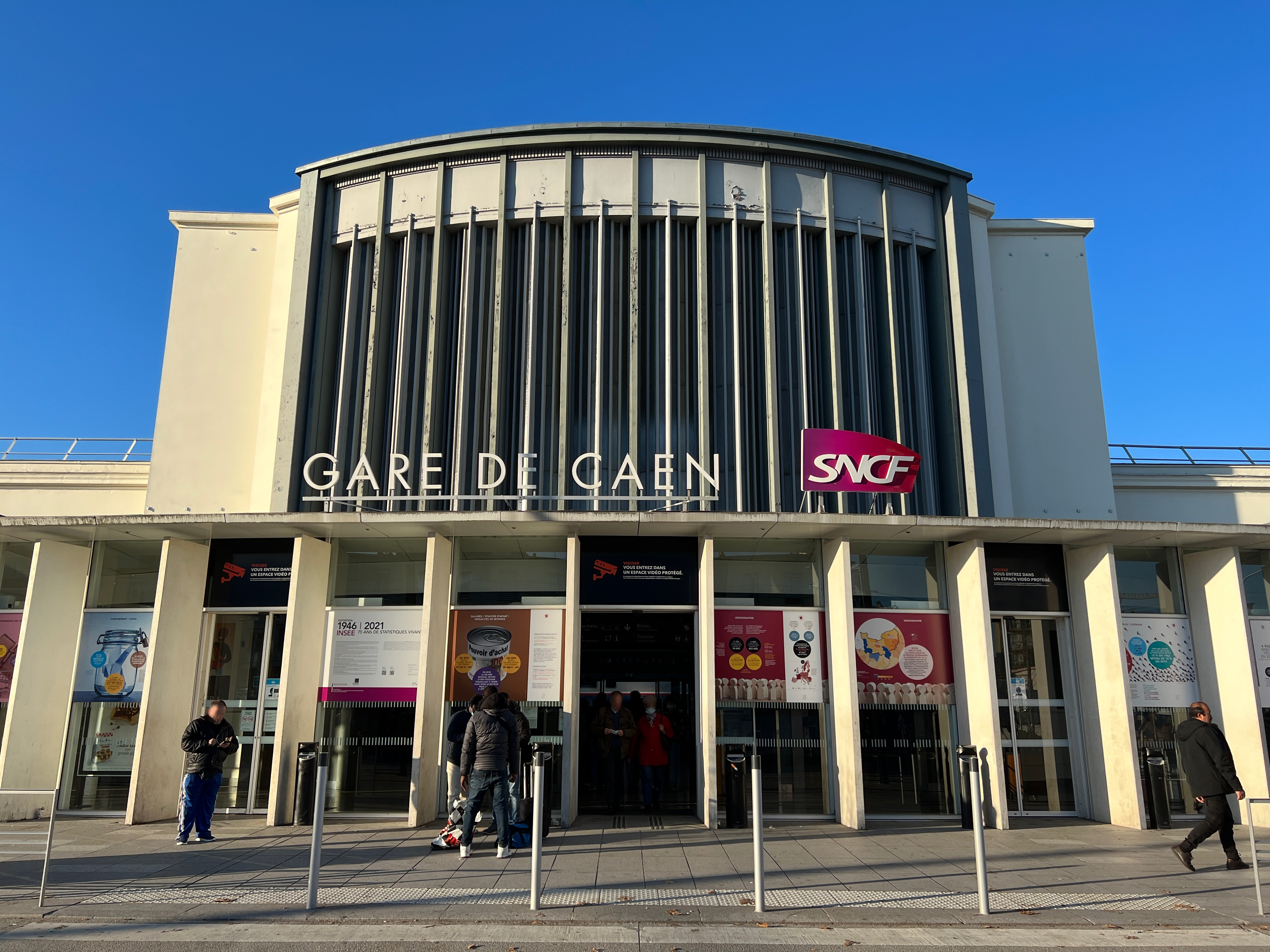

General information
- Owner: SNCF
- Line: Paris–Cherbourg railway
- Platforms: 7

Other information
- Station code: 87444000

History
- Opened: 1857; 169 years ago

Passengers
- 2024: 4,255,508

Services
Preceding station	TER Normandie	Following station
Lisieux towards Paris-Saint-Lazare	Krono+	Bayeux towards Cherbourg
Terminus	Krono	Mézidon towards Rouen-RD
Terminus	Krono	Mézidon towards Le Mans
Terminus	Krono	Bayeux towards Cherbourg
Terminus	Citi	Bretteville-Norrey towards Granville
Terminus	Citi	Frénouville-Cagny towards Lisieux
Terminus	Proxi	Mézidon towards Rouen-RD
Location

Caen, Gare de l'Ouest or Gare Calvados, is the main and now only station serving the city of Caen, Normandy, France. The station stands on the main line from Paris to Cherbourg and although it mainly is an intercity station many regional trains use the station. Typical services link Caen to Lisieux, Paris, Rouen, Saint-Lô, Granville, Bayeux and Cherbourg. The station opened in 1857 with the arrival of the CF de l'Ouest line from Paris. The station was rebuilt by Henri Pacon in 1934.

== Services ==
The following services call at Caen :

- Local services (TER Normandie) Cherbourg – Caen – Lisieux
- Local services (TER Normandie) Caen – Alençon – Le Mans
- Local services (TER Normandie) Caen – Lisieux – Bernay – Rouen
- Local services (TER Normandie) Caen – Lison – Saint-Lô – Avranches – Rennes

== See also ==
- Caen Saint-Martin station (Caen à la Mer)
- Caen Saint-Pierre station (CF du Calvados)
