= Luc-sur-Mer =

- Commune
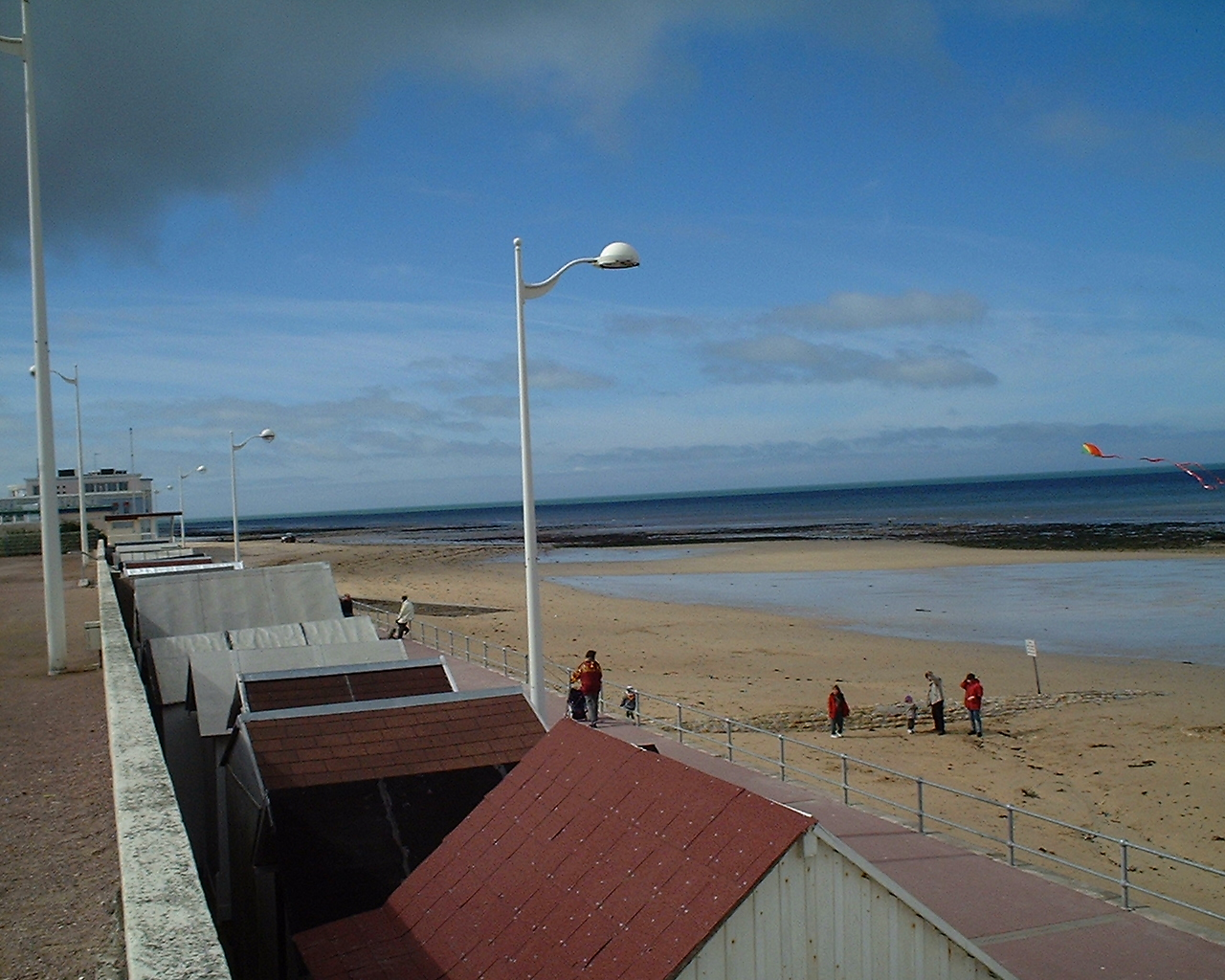
- Beachfront

- Coat of arms
- Location of Luc-sur-Mer
- Location within France Location within Normandy
- Coordinates: 49°18′56″N 0°21′16″W
- Country: France
- Region: Normandy
- Department: Calvados
- Arrondissement: Caen
- Canton: Courseulles-sur-Mer
- Intercommunality: CC Cœur de Nacre

Government
  - Mayor (2026–32): Philippe Chanu
- Area^{1}: 3.94 km^{2} (1.52 sq mi)
- Elevation: 7 m (23 ft)
- Highest elevation: 33 m (108 ft)
- Lowest elevation: 4 m (13 ft)
- Population (2023): 3,275
  - Density: 831/km^{2} (2,150/sq mi)
- Demonym: Lutins
- Time zone: UTC+01:00 (CET)
  - Summer (DST): UTC+02:00 (CEST)
- INSEE/Postal code: 14384 /14530
- ^{1} French Land Register data, which excludes lakes, ponds, glaciers > 1 km^{2} (0.386 sq mi or 247 acres) and river estuaries.

Luc-sur-Mer (French pronunciation: [lyk syʁ mɛʁ], literally Luc on Sea) is a commune in the Calvados department in the Normandy region in northwestern France.

== Population ==
Historical population
| Year | Pop. | ±% p.a. |
|---|---|---|
| 1968 | 1,976 | — |
| 1975 | 2,392 | +2.77% |
| 1982 | 2,609 | +1.25% |
| 1990 | 2,902 | +1.34% |
| 1999 | 3,036 | +0.50% |
| 2007 | 3,172 | +0.55% |
| 2012 | 3,134 | −0.24% |
| 2017 | 3,182 | +0.30% |
| 2023 | 3,275 | +0.48% |
Source: INSEE

== Sights ==
- The "Maison de la Baleine" created by Jean Chabriac. On 15 January 1885 a 40-ton,19-metre long whale beached in Luc sur Mer. Its skeleton is now on display in the municipal park.
- Luc sur Mer cliffs
- The cemetery's cross is estimated to date from 1662
- The Church of Saint-Quentin in Luc-sur-Mer dates from the 19th century, with the exception of its detached bell tower—inherited from the previous church—which dates from the 12th century. This bell tower is classified as a historical monument.
- The cemetery cross is believed to date from 1662; it is classified as a historical monument.
- The Chapel of Notre-Dame de l'Espérance (23 Rue de la Mer)—also known as the "bathers' chapel"—was built in the Neo-Gothic style around 1865 on the site of an earlier votive chapel. It was constructed by Abbé Pierre Frédéric Vengeon, the parish priest from 1850 to 1883, who is buried in the apse. Renovated in 1958, the chapel features distinctive contemporary furnishings: a statue of the Virgin carved from a single log by Lydia Luzanowski (a Ukrainian artist born in Kyiv in 1899, who attended the blessing of her work on August 4, 1959); an altar made of Berchères stone designed by Jean Ransart; a wrought-iron screen by ironworker Jacques Briand; and abstract stained-glass windows created in 1957 by master glass artist Gérard Lardeur. The icon of the Virgin hanging on the north transept pillar is the work of Roger Blanchard, a painter who settled in the town in 1995.
- The cliffs of Luc-sur-Mer, a site classified in 1976.
- The "Pierre de Luc" menhir, owned by the French Prehistoric Society. * The jetty was erected in 1971, having been transported from Ouistreham, as an extension of the area known as "Brèche Marais."
- The skeleton of a whale that beached on the shore between Luc-sur-Mer and Langrune-sur-Mer in January 1885 has been on display since 1938 in the municipal park at the "Maison de la Baleine" (Whale House) museum.
- The former station of the Caen-Courseulles railway line, which serves as a gendarmerie station during the summer season and a music school during the academic year.
- The "Le Drakkar" cinema, dating from 1931.
- The casino, designed by Caen-based architect Auvray and inaugurated in 1956.
- The Château de Mathan, severely damaged during World War II and demolished shortly thereafter.
- The Coastal Environment Research Center operates under the University of Caen-Normandie. Following the death of Arcisse de Caumont on April 16, 1873, his widow approved a plan drawn up by the Faculty of Science to convert Arcisse de Caumont's villa in Luc-sur-Mer into a marine laboratory; the conversion work was carried out during the summer of 1881.

== See also ==
- Communes of the Calvados department
