= Mantes-la-Jolie–Cherbourg railway =

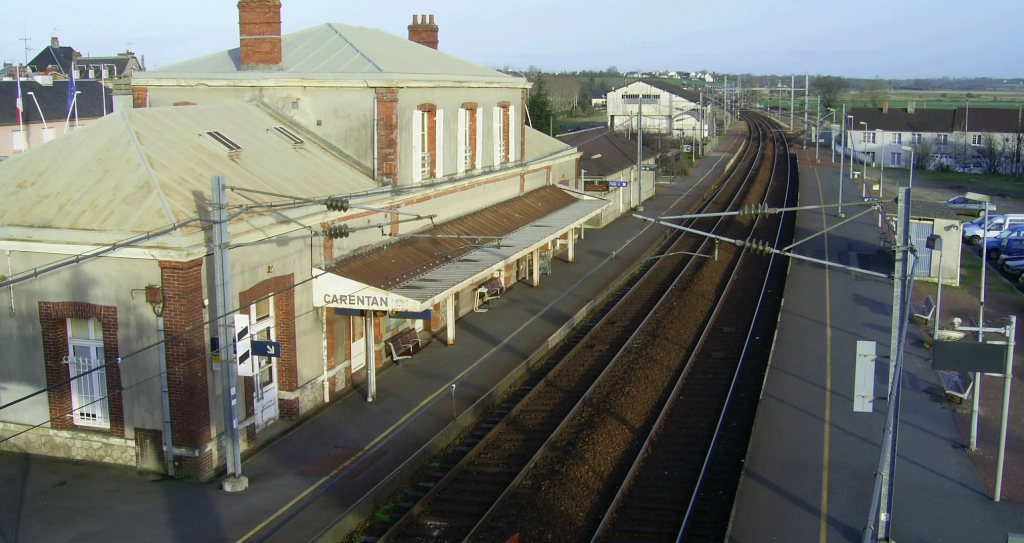
- Carentan railway station

Overview
- Status: Operational
- Owner: RFF
- Locale: France (Île-de-France, Normandy)
- Termini: Mantes-la-Jolie station; Cherbourg station

Service
- System: SNCF
- Operator(s): SNCF

History
- Opened: 1855-1858

Technical
- Line length: 313 km (194 mi)
- Number of tracks: Double track
- Track gauge: 1,435 mm (4 ft 8 1/2 in) standard gauge
- Electrification: 25 kV 50 Hz

The railway from Mantes-la-Jolie to Cherbourg is an important French 228-kilometre long railway line, that connects Mantes-la-Jolie, a western suburb of Paris, with the northwestern port city Cherbourg via Caen. At Mantes-la-Jolie, the railway line is connected with the Paris–Le Havre railway. The line was opened between 1855 and 1858 by the Chemins de Fer de l'Ouest.

== Route ==
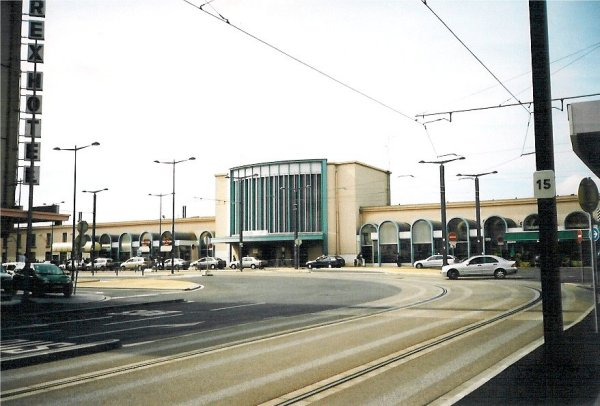
Caen Station in 2003.

The line serves the towns Mantes-la-Jolie, Évreux, Bernay, Lisieux, Caen, and is extended to Cherbourg. It is 313 km long from Mantes-la-Jolie to Cherbourg (370 km from Paris). It was electrified with 25 kV AC in June 1996.

=== Main stations ===
The main stations on the Mantes-la-Jolie–Cherbourg railway are:

- Mantes-la-Jolie station
- Évreux-Normandie station
- Lisieux station
- Caen station
- Cherbourg station

== Line history ==
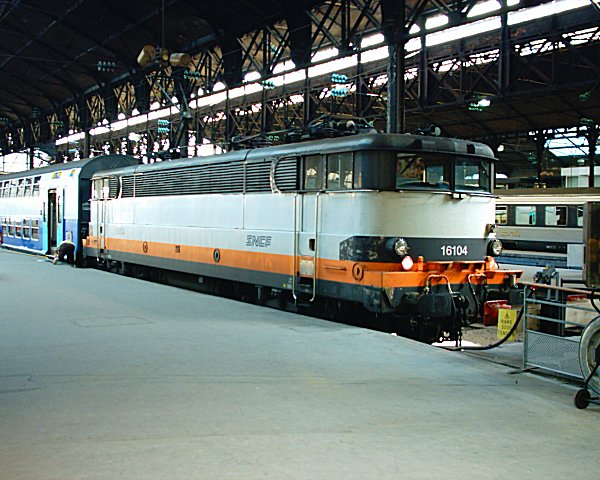
Intercity train at Saint Lazare.

The railway from Paris to Rouen via Mantes-la-Jolie was opened in 1843. A concession for a railway from Mantes to Caen was already granted in 1846, but the first section from Mantes to Lisieux was only opened in July 1855. Lisieux–Caen followed in December 1855, and the final section Caen–Cherbourg in July 1858.

The line was known for using the post-World War II, American-built SNCF 141R steam engines as well as turbotrain-type trains from September 1970. After electrification in 1996, BB16000 and BB 26000 locomotive-hauled trains are used.

== Services ==
The Mantes-la-Jolie–Cherbourg railway is used by the following passenger services:

- TGV from Cherbourg to Dijon
- Intercités from Paris to Caen, Cherbourg and Saint-Lô
- TER Normandie regional services
