= Ligne de la Côte Fleurie =

Railway line in northern France

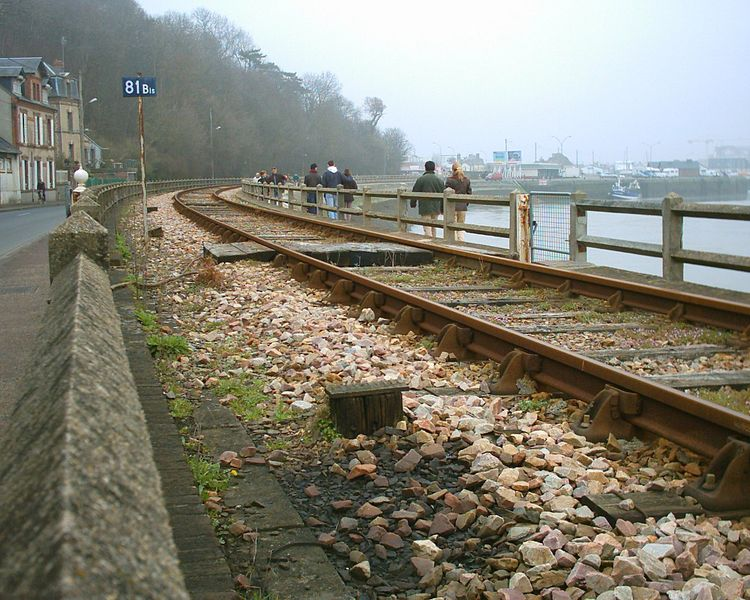
- The railway line along the river Dives

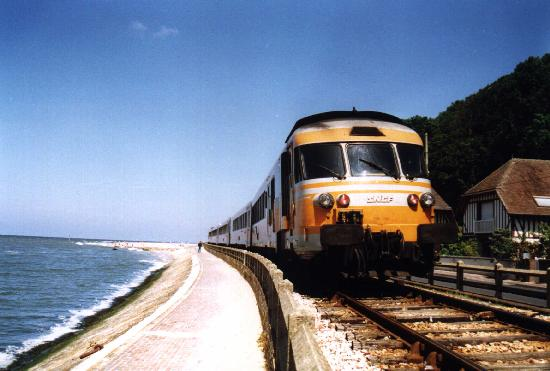
SNCF's turbotrain in Houlgate on the Deauville-Dives railway line in summer 1989.

The Ligne de la Côte Fleurie (Note: This can be translated in English as "Floral Coast Line".) (French pronunciation: [liɲ də la kot flœʁi]) is a railway line serving the towns of the Côte Fleurie, Calvados, France.

The railway line, which is approximately 20 kilometres (12 mi) long, was built in sections between 1882 and 1884. The unelectrified line runs between Deauville and Dives-sur-Mer along the English Channel through countryside and is operated by Diesel multiple units.

== History ==
The line was built in three sections between 1882 and 1884. The first section was built between Dives-sur-Mer and Houlgate in 1882 as an extension of a railway line from Mézidon-Canon on the main railway line between Paris and Caen. A second portion of the railway line was built from Deauville to Villers-sur-Mer later in 1882, as a spur of the main line originating from Lisieux on the railway line between Paris and Caen. The last section between Houlgate, then called Beuzeval, and Villers-sur-Mer opened in 1884.

Traditional service was steam trains from Paris and to Caen. Rail services were operated by steam locomotives until 1975, when hauling of trains was entrusted to the turbotrain. This lasted until 1996 when the line lost its main line status, Grandes Lignes, and became a regional railway line, TER. Trains were then hauled by X 4500 and no direct trains to Paris ran.

=== Operation today ===
From 2003, rail services have been operated by X 73500 DMUs.

The track is being replaced and wooden sleepers replaced by concrete sleepers to permit trains to run at speeds of 100 km/h (62 mph) instead of the 40 to 80 km/h (25 to 50 mph) currently in force.

There are no junctions along the line and no luminous signalling. The only forms of signalling are speed signs, level crossing number boards and distance markers (in hectometres and kilometres). The only point work is situated at Trouville-Deauville station and enables joint operation with the line to Paris and in the yard preceding Dives-sur-Mer which has been mothballed.

On Sunday 28 February 2010 a tree fell on the line between railway crossings PN87 and PN88 near the Golf de Houlgate. Traffic was interrupted whilst the tree was removed from under the train's front bogie.

== Route ==
The line begins at Trouville-Deauville and ends at Dives-sur-Mer. Six stations are served as well as a halt. Leaving Deauville southeasterly, the line follows the track of the line to Lisieux. In the commune of Saint-Arnoult the line leaves the main line to take a curved westerly course towards Tourgéville on a steady grade up to PN 107. The line then travels towards Blonville-sur-Mer and Villers-sur-Mer a few metres above sea level. From Villers-sur-Mer the line rises to an altitude of 130 m (430 ft) to reach the closed station of Gonneville-Saint-Vaast. The line then observes a downward grade in the Drochon valley towards Houlgate. After Houlgate the line proceeds onto a 500 m (1,600 ft) long steel and brick viaduct across several streets as well as the Drochon. At the end of the viaduct, the line proceeds to PN 83 and crosses Rue des Bains next to the river Dives. The line then proceeds towards Dives-sur-Mer along the Dives and Rue des Bains on a portion of railway line famous for its beauty. The line is then situated between the Mont de Caumont hill and the RD513 road. After passing Port of Dives-sur-Mer, the line reaches Dives-sur-Mer after passing the only yard of the line, now closed.

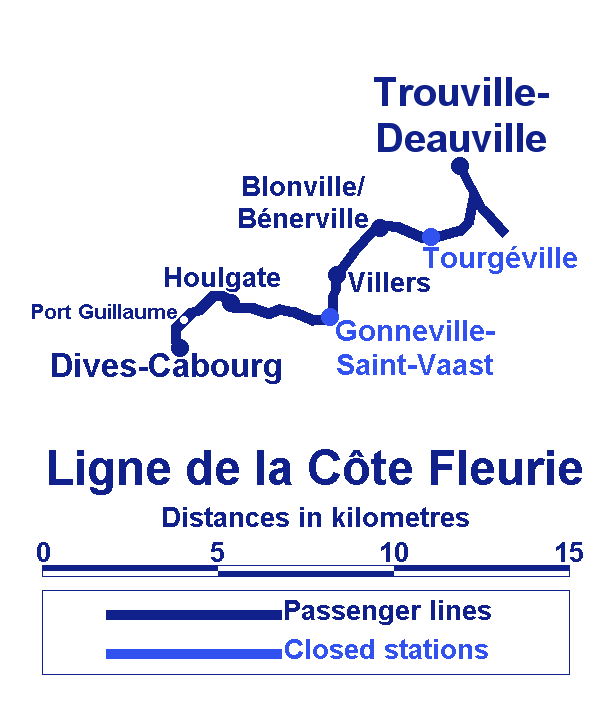
Plan of the ligne de la Côte Fleurie.

The railway used to run towards Mézidon-Canon and Caen but closed on 31 March 1938. The track remains for 2 km (1.2 mi), blocked by two buffers in Dives station.

=== Stations ===
The stations served are:

- Trouville-Deauville
  - Tourgéville
- Blonville-sur-Mer
- Villers-sur-Mer
  - Gonneville-Saint-Vaast
- Houlgate
- Dives-sur-Mer
