= Houlgate station =

Railway station in Houlgate, France

Coordinates: 49°18′0″N 0°4′37″W

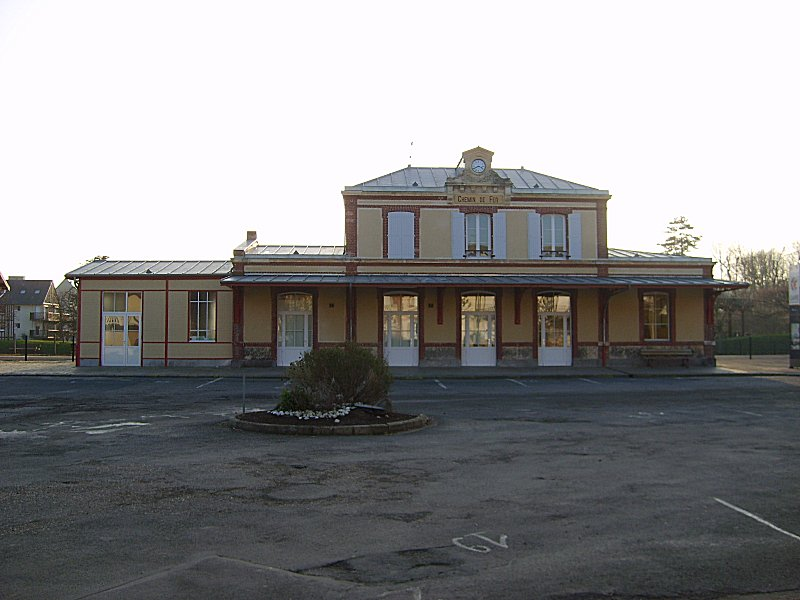
Houlgate's station building.

Houlgate is the railway station for the town of Houlgate, Calvados department, Normandy, northwestern France. The station is built in Ouest architecture.

It's located on the Côte Fleurie branchline from Trouville-Deauville and to Dives-Cabourg.

The line from Mézidon opened in 1879 and extended to Houlgate in 1882. The line from Trouville-Deauville to Villers-sur-Mer and Houlgate opened two years later but the station was then called Beuzeval-Houlgate, followed by Houlgate-Beuzeval and finally Houlgate. A goods yard was in use until the mid-1990s as well as the station building (until 1996), the station is now only used as a stop by regional trains and tickets must be bought on-board trains. The trains between Trouville-Deauville and Dives-Cabourg only run in summer.

The station building was renovated during Spring 2007. The station building was repainted and the main room reopened as a waiting room. The period clock on the station front was repaired.

Preceding station	TER Normandie	Following station
Villers-sur-Mer towards Trouville-Deauville	Seasonal	Dives-sur-Mer-Port-Guillaume towards Dives-Cabourg
