= Villers-sur-Mer station =

Railway station in Villers-sur-Mer, France

Coordinates: 49°18′58″N 0°0′35″E

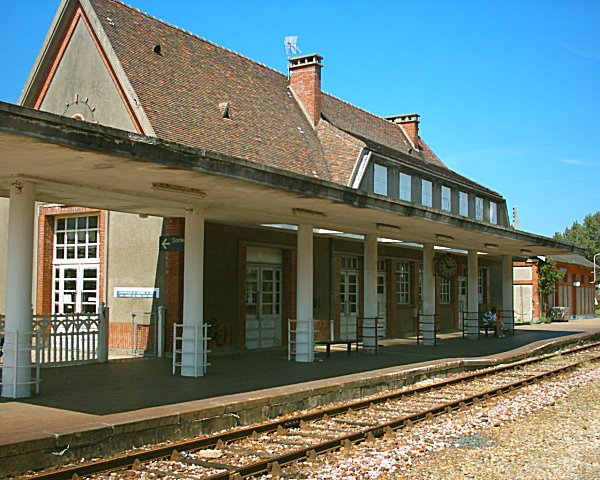
Villers-sur-Mer station building

Villers-sur-Mer is the railway station for the town of Villers-sur-Mer. The station is built in Ouest architecture and is on the Côte Fleurie branchline from Trouville-Deauville and to Dives-Cabourg.

The line from Trouville-Deauville to Villers-sur-Mer and Houlgate opened in 1884. The station building was in use until 1996, but is now only used as a stop by regional trains and tickets must be bought on-board trains. The trains between Trouville-Deauville and Dives-Cabourg only run in summer.

Preceding station	TER Normandie	Following station
Blonville-sur-Mer-Benerville towards Trouville-Deauville	Seasonal	Houlgate towards Dives-Cabourg
