= Houlgate =

- Commune
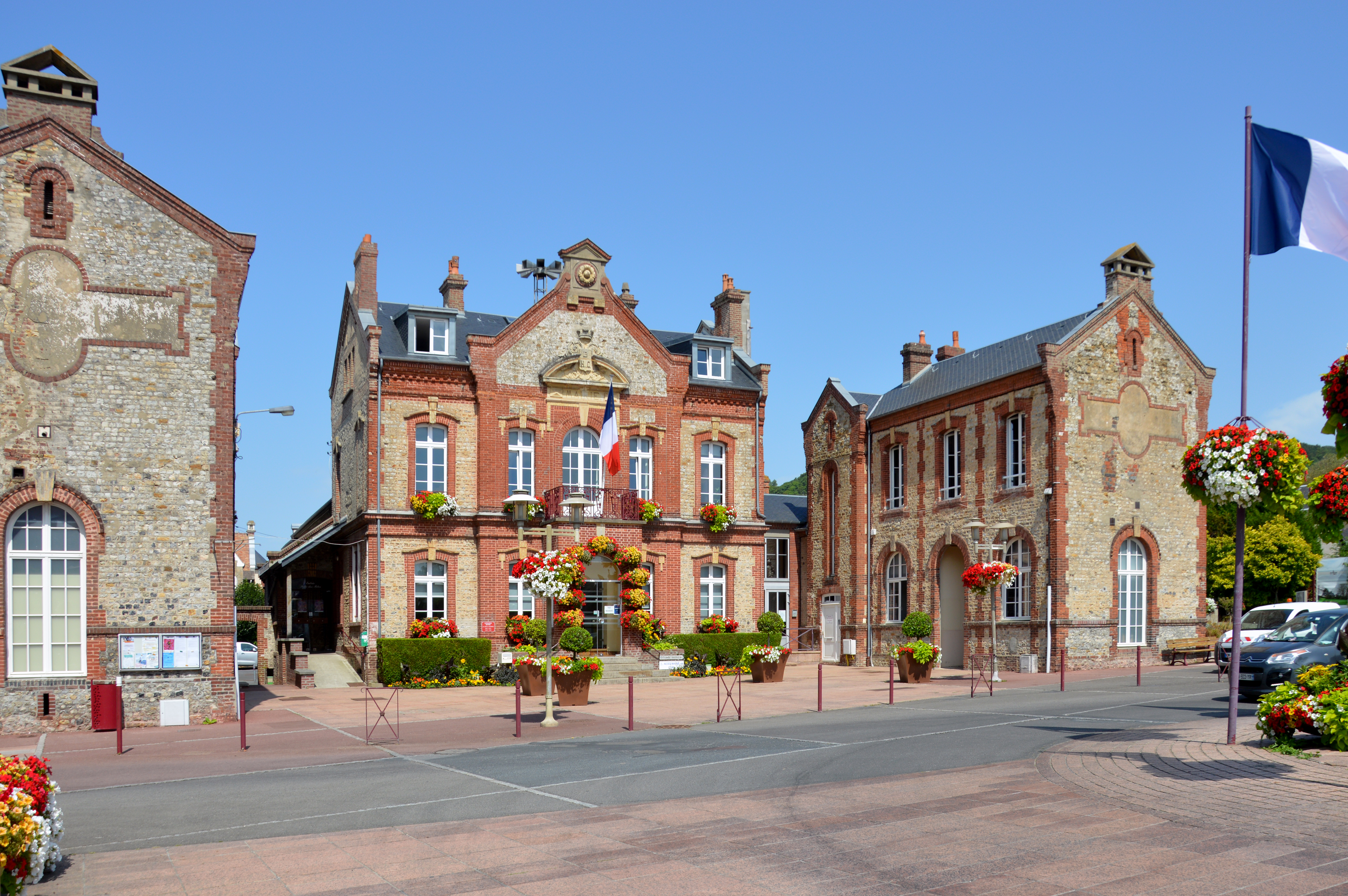
- Town Hall

- Flag Coat of arms
- Location of Houlgate
- Location within France Location within Normandy
- Coordinates: 49°18′N 0°05′W
- Country: France
- Region: Normandy
- Department: Calvados
- Arrondissement: Lisieux
- Canton: Cabourg
- Intercommunality: CC Normandie-Cabourg-Pays d'Auge

Government
  - Mayor (2020–2026): Olivier Colin
- Area^{1}: 4.69 km^{2} (1.81 sq mi)
- Elevation: 5 m (16 ft)
- Highest elevation: 124 m (407 ft)
- Lowest elevation: 0 m (0 ft)
- Population (2023): 1,834
  - Density: 391/km^{2} (1,010/sq mi)
- Time zone: UTC+01:00 (CET)
  - Summer (DST): UTC+02:00 (CEST)
- INSEE/Postal code: 14338 /14510
- ^{1} French Land Register data, which excludes lakes, ponds, glaciers > 1 km^{2} (0.386 sq mi or 247 acres) and river estuaries.

Houlgate (French pronunciation: [ulɡat]) is a small tourist resort in northwestern France along the English Channel with a beach and a casino. It is a commune in the Calvados department in the Normandy region.

== History ==
=== Pre-19th century ===
Houlgate developed as a hamlet in the commune of Beuzeval. Up until the 19th century, Beuzeval consisted of only a few small houses and farms. On the southern side of the stream was Le Hameau de la Mer, consisting of a few houses, a tile and brick works and a water mill. In 1793, only 204 inhabitants lived in the commune.

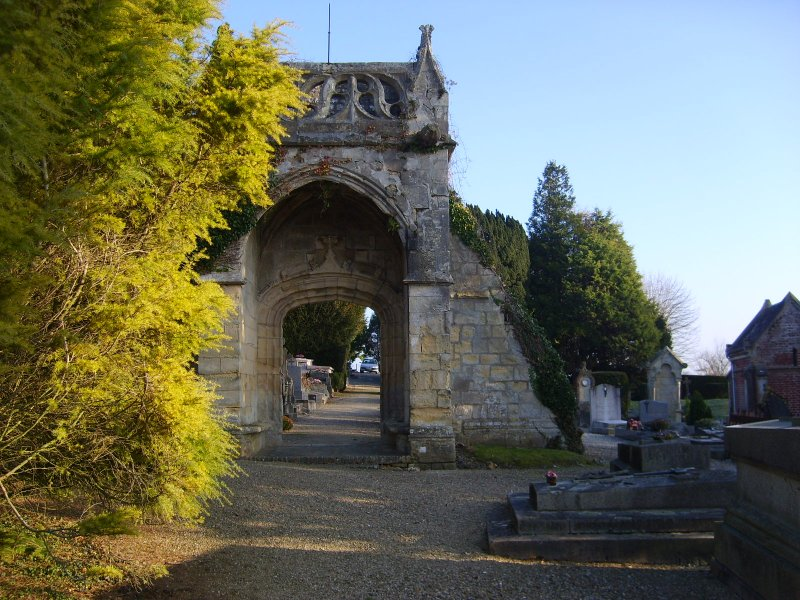
The old church of Saint Aubin in Beuzeval.

=== 19th century: development as a resort ===
Between 1845 and 1850, sea bathing became popular in Beuzeval. The Pilter family opened the first guesthouse for poorer protestant families in 1851 on Rue Sébastien-de-Neufville. Numbers of tourists gradually increased, first from Caen and then Paris and so a wooden boarding house was built. The sea-side village was named Beuzeval-les-Bains and attracted much Protestant gentry. The population increased from the 1860s onwards: 270 inhabitants in 1851, 345 in 1861, 515 in 1872 and 1 011 in 1881.

The north bank of the Drochon, larger and flatter, was still undeveloped. A company called the Société de Construction Immobilière (S.C.I.) was formed in 1858 to develop that area of Beuzeval. The company was formed by three men, a financier, a lawyer and a member of parliament, who bought most of the land, divided it into properties, drew the lines for streets and built a wall protecting the developing town from the sea. Within a few years large villas (then called chalets) were built and the quality of build can be seen now as most of these properties still exist.

In 1860, the chapel of Notre-Dame de Houlgate was built. It replaced the old church which was situated too far inland and had become too small to accommodate the growing population.

After the construction and opening of the Grand Hôtel in 1859, the first casino was built and the grandly named "Hydrotherapy" baths which were managed by François Blanc. The baths' aims were to monitor swimmers and to provide cabins. At the time, it was considered imperative to go to a hot bath once out of the sea to resume normal bodily functions. The establishment was not only open to swimmers but also to anyone who wanted a hot seawater bath.

The post office dates from 1894, it housed postal and telegraphic services and the building still in use today, next to the old boys school (now a school canteen and kindergarten). Its architect was M.R. Lewicki who also built several mansions on the seafront.

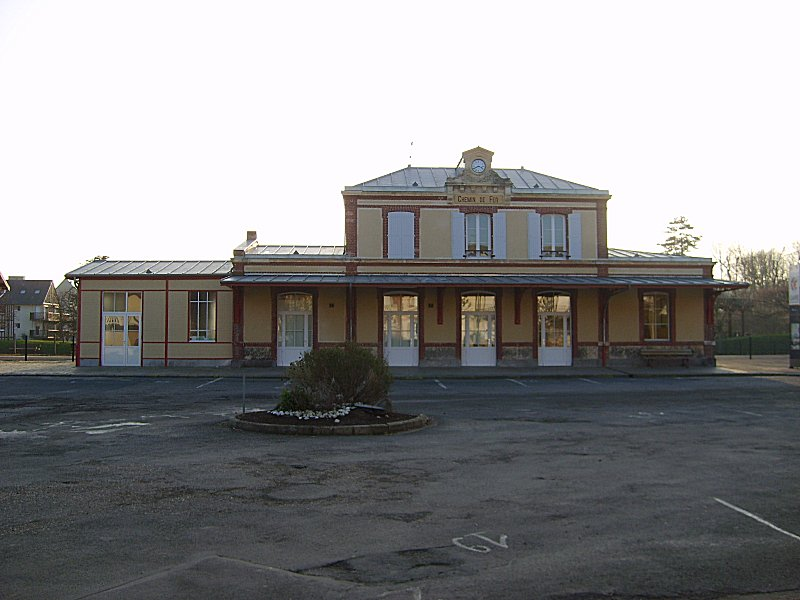
Houlgate train station in winter 2008

In 1882, the railway arrived in Houlgate, with Houlgate station placed between Dives-sur-Mer and Houlgate. The walk below the cliffs separating Dives-sur-Mer and Houlgate soon became history when the railway line was built along the south side of the estuary of the river Dives. In fact, the railway was built on the retaining wall protecting it from the winter storms and protected a new road built behind it. In 1884 the line to Villers-sur-Mer was finished, linking Houlgate to Paris (via Trouville-Deauville). It then took 4 hours by train to travel to the Paris Saint-Lazare in Paris and did not require a change of train.

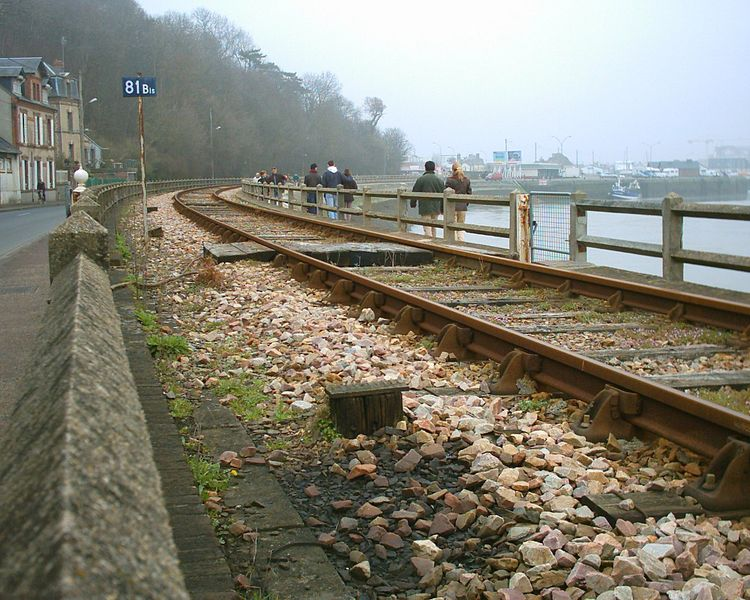
Houlgate sea retainer wall in spring 2005

=== Early 20th century ===
In 1905, the village took the name of Houlgate, a name which comes from the hill to the north-east of the coastal village. The town continued to grow with more and more hotels and The Promenade was finished in 1911. The town then welcomed many celebrities and royalty.

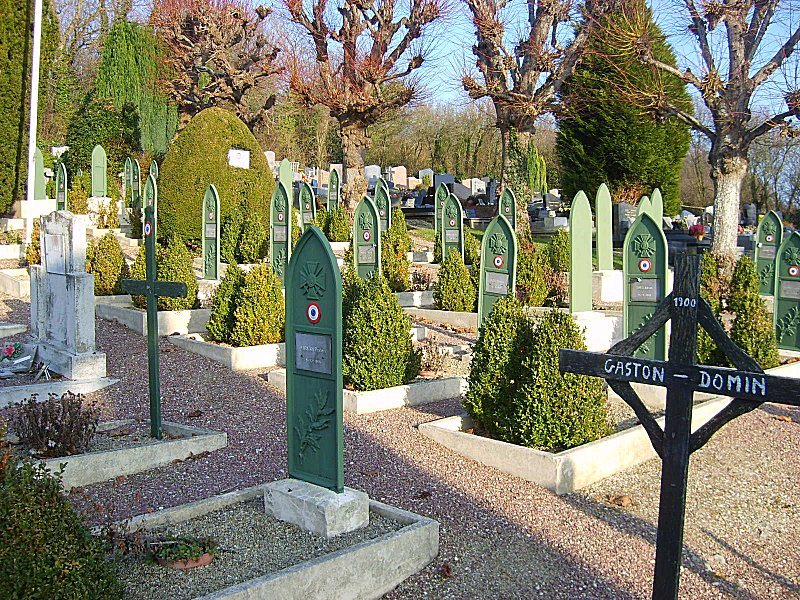
First World War graves in Beuzeval cemetery

On September 6, 1912, early French aviator Roland Garros took off from the beach of Houlgate to break the world altitude record. Houlgate named their promenade after Garros in celebration of the town being the location where Garros broke the altitude record.

Like all communes of France, Houlgate experienced a general mobilisation as men were called up to fight in the Great War in 1914. The French Army's 3rd Corps created temporary hospitals and requisitioned all hotels and some large villas. Houlgate became a hospital town where local "Houlgatais" mingled with soldiers who had been wounded on the front.

Tourist activities resumed timidly in 1917. Fortunes had been lost and Houlgate never found the bustle it had experienced during the Belle Époque. The Versailles Treaty was signed on 26 June 1919 and the war ended. In 1921 Houlgate's first mini golf was opened. In 1933, an Alsatian named Laurent Laemlé, created a beach club called the Neptune Club near the casino and quickly opened another one near the Kursaal.

=== Second World War ===
With the surrender of France, Houlgate was under German occupation until 21 August 1944. In 1943 the Wehrmacht concentrated on the construction of the Atlantic Wall, laying barbed wire, concrete bunkers, and anti-tank obstacles. In Houlgate this meant the installation of radar and a 155 mm cannon on the Butte de Houlgate. These installations were the target of several aerial and naval attacks between 26 April and 21 August 1944.

The Batterie de Tournebride on the Butte de Houlgate was the objective of Operation Sunstar, a British Commandos raid on the night of 22/23 November 1941. Ninety men of No.9 Commando travelled across the English Channel on HMS Prince Leopold and landed at the bottom of the Vaches Noires. The old ferry transported four Assault Landing Crafts (ALC) which were used for the landing. Four fast gunboats were used to provide cover.

The operation encountered difficulties and did not succeed in destroying the battery position despite being located. It did not succeed in taking any prisoners either but useful information was collected. The commandos escaped on board their ALCs.

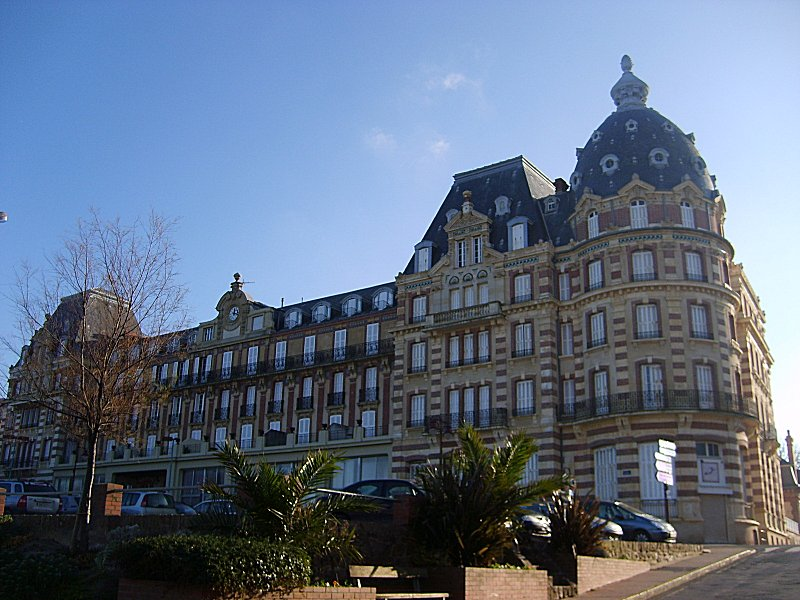
Houlgate Grand Hotel

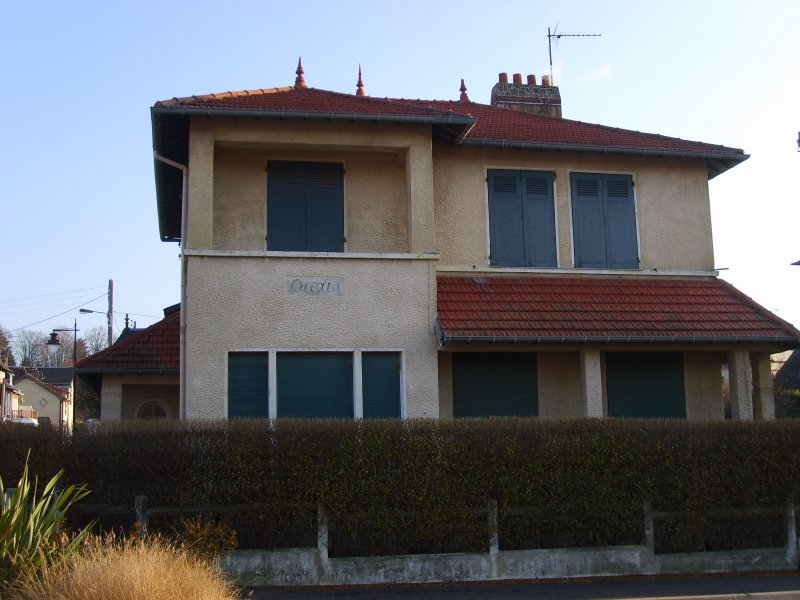
Houlgate Kommandantur, Villa Onexis.

By 21 August, the Germans had abandoned the town, and the British Army along with Belgian soldiers of the Brigate Piron entered Houlgate.

=== 20th century ===
From October 1944, the long task of demining the beach began. Each site was double checked and it was not uncommon to find mines on the second run. Fifteen deminers were killed during the demining. The de-mining engineers are still remembered and celebrated each year.

The 1960s were marked with an increase in holidaymakers and in the summers, Nestlé kept three amphibious cars, called Nescannard. These rafts were used to ferry children on trips of ten minutes along the coast near the beach.

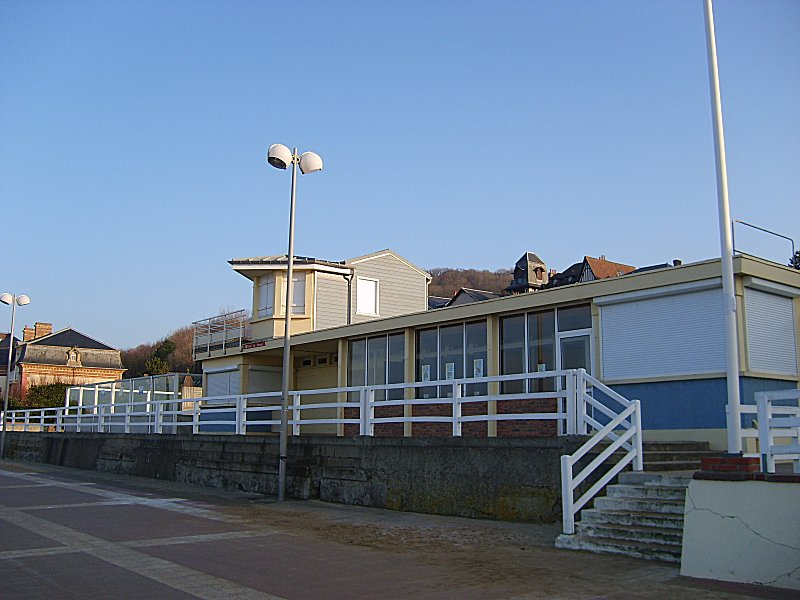
The new Etablissement des Bains.

In 1963 the new établissement des bains was opened.

In 1967 Houlgate's first horse riding club, the Shetland Club, was created. Philippe Bellanger, officer of the Haras Nationaux and Jean Larigauderie opened the club to promote riding that once been part of the history of Houlgate and to lead riders on trips to the beach and to the surrounding countryside. In 1971 the club moved to the Clos Guilllaume where it remains.

1971 also marked the beginning of building of holiday apartments in Houlgate.

In 1974 the Saint-Aubin church received a new pipe organ, the old one was donated to the church in Dives which did not have one until then. The new organ was inaugurated on 19 July 1974 with a concert led by André Marchal. The thirtieth anniversary of the organ was celebrated in 2004 with a concert led by Jean-François Moisson as well as an exhibition by Father Lefèvre.

The manor in Beuzeval was converted into flats in 1980 and Mr de Lovinfosse (former owner of Union Chimique Belge) bought the grounds and built a 9-hole golf course. Despite hard beginnings, the Countess de Brion, who was made administrator by Mr de Lovinfosse, opened an additional 9 holes. Profits were low and the course was taken over by Blue Green.

The Avenue de l'Europe was built and opened in 1985, leading from Place Franklin and Rue de la Vallée, near the Clos Guillaume. A new level crossing, n°83b was opened as a result.

In 1997, the Festijazz was created, a festival of jazz music concerts. The 2006 festival included 500 groups playing over three days.

In 2001, a landslide occurred on the Butte de Caumont, the slide left the lighthouse unscathed. Road circulation was hindered during the months spent cleaning the mud from the road.

In 2005, the change of the commune's name to Houlgate was celebrated with a Belle Epoque centenary festival, with many local people, including the mayor, dressed in traditional 1900s (decade) clothing. A re-enactment of seine fishing was also part of the festivities, as well as a demonstration of 1900s (decade) fire-fighting equipment, old bicycles, a cider delivery cart and a group of 1900s (decade) baigneurs.

=== Etymology ===
Houlgate is a common variation in Normandy of Norrois origin: "holr gata" "chemin creux" (deep path). Variations can also be seen in Denmark as "Hulgade" and in the United Kingdom as "Holegate".

In the Middle Ages Beuzeval was called Bovalis, which became Eclesia-de-Bovalis, then Boseval, a name that can be found written as such in 1077. Evolution of the name and variations are classic of Normandy. Some explain this name as meaning "vallée des Boeufs" (valley of oxen); others give it a Germanic origin. Examples of variations include Beuzeville, Beuzebosc and Beuzemouchel.

== Geography ==
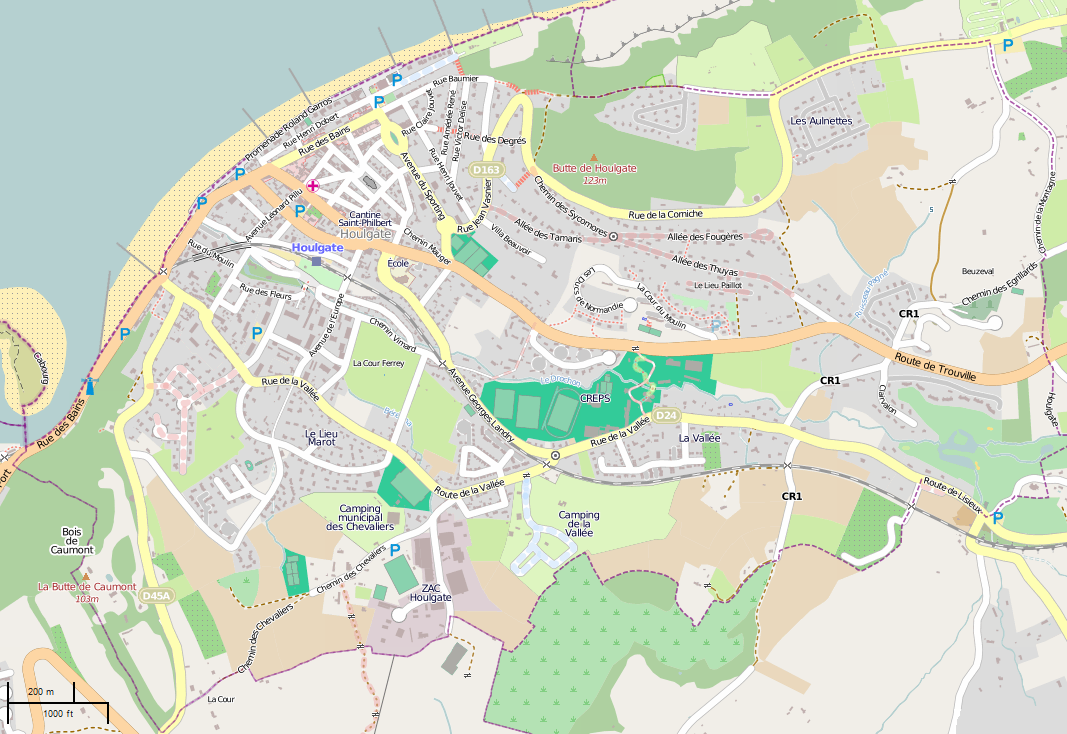
A plan of the town

Houlgate is located along the English Channel in the valley of the Drochon. The valley is mostly built up or used for pasture. The town's area is 4.69 km^{2} and the average altitude 5 m. Despite its low average height, the town contains two hills which form the natural limits of the commune:

- Butte de Houlgate 123 m
- Butte de Caumont 103 m

The high parts of the town are covered by Houlgate's two woods: Le Bois de Boulogne on the Butte de Houlgate and Le Bois de la Butte de Caumont.

=== The Drochon ===
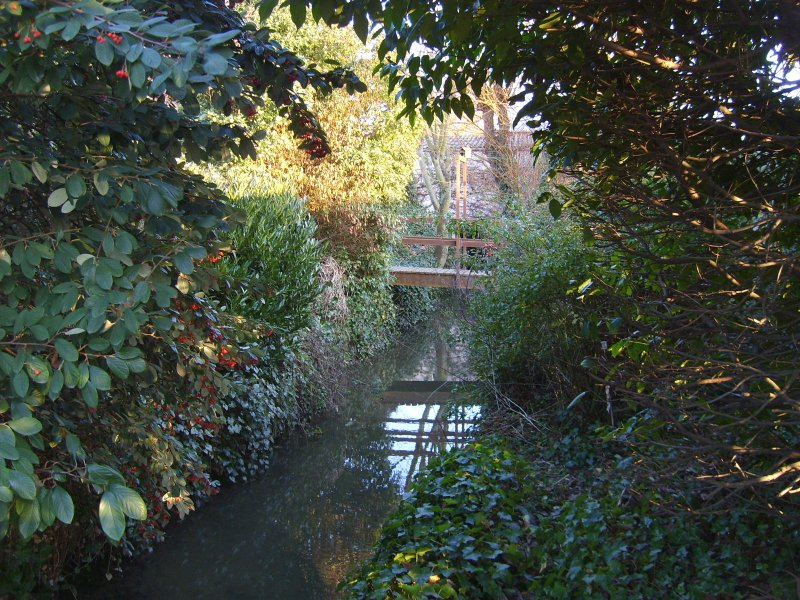
The Drochon as seen from the Rue Pasteur.

The douet (Normand variation of ruisseau or stream) Drochon (once spelt Drauchon) finds its name from the Germanic Drogo or Drogone. This stream, with an irregular flow, is formed by the confluence of at least ten lesser streams and brooks; The Mennetot, des Broches, Gonneville, Riqueville, Tolleville, the Pagné, Petiot, Désert and Bougon springs and the Bérézina.

Some of the springs and fountains of the Drochon's tributary are still subject to pilgrimage; the Saint-Laurent spring at Trousseauville is said to cure skin problems. Discarded clothing can often be seen when visiting the site. Pilgrims wet items of clothing and stroke their wounds and then offer the clothes as donation to the saint.

The Drochon's estuary has always caused problems as sand accumulated. In 1880, the commune paid a labourer 135₣ a year to keep the river's bed clear and maintain the flow.

There were up to three mills, once the property of nobles or the Saint Etienne Abbey of Caen. The only mill still standing is the Moulin Landry which is privately owned. The village had one wash house built in 1885 which was restored in 1990 and still stands near the railway station.

=== Falaises des Vaches Noires ===
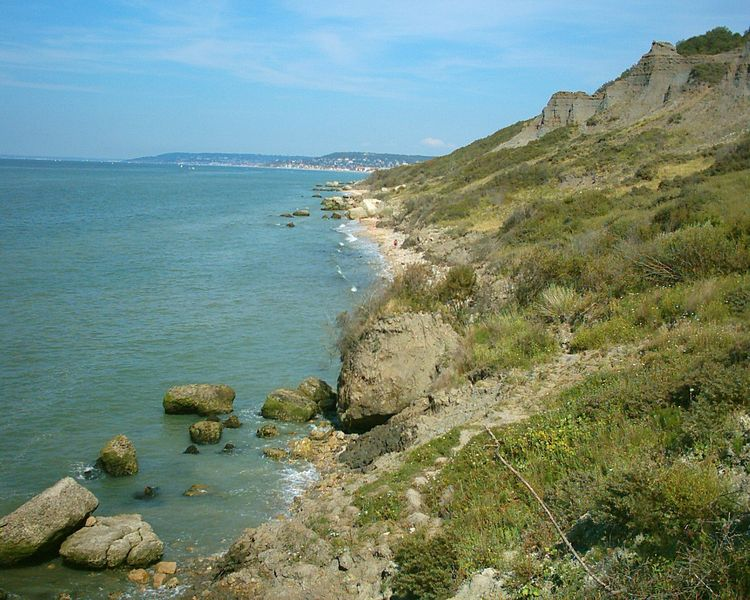
Falaises des Vaches Noires, summer 2004

To the East of Houlgate and below Auberville and West of Villers-sur-Mer lies the wild site of the Falaises des Vaches Noires, the cliffs of the black cows. These cliffs are a fossil necropolis underneath which lay countless ammonites. The cliffs are slowly being eaten by the sea. Areas of the cliffs have been nicknamed the Desert, the Chaos... The Chaos is prone to landslides due to the seeping of water from the ground and down to the beach, the top layers of clay slowly sliding above the layers underneath, creating an unusual terrain.

The cliffs are made of three distinct layers; Callovian, lower Oxfordian and higher Oxfordian.

=== Bois de Boulogne ===
The first photographs of the Butte de Houlgate show a barren hill, and so the SCI quickly planted trees. In 1928, the municipal council voted to create a picturesque zone, or green-belt, to protect it from further building and maintain its character. This meant that the trees would be kept and would prevent future landslides. During the Second World War, the site was heavily bombed and as a result all the conifers planted in the early 19th century were destroyed. Since then, vegetation has grown back; sycamores, horse-chestnut and ash.

=== Butte de Caumont ===
The Butte de Caumont was originally an arid area. Caumont comes from Calvus-Mons Mont Chauve, Shaved Mount and was named as such in 1260. In a charter written by Philip the Bold the hill is referred to as Chauve-Mont sur Dives.

== Administration ==
=== Mayors of Houlgate ===
List of Mayors (Sources: References)

Period		Name	Quality
1800	1804	Guillaume Robert Lebrun	
1804	1806	Jean-Adrien de Beaumont	
1806	1815	Charles Liégeard	
1815	1831	Henry d'Agier	
1831	1868	Jacques Landry	
1868	1871	Gabriel Davioud	Inspecteur général des travaux d'architecture de la ville de Paris
1871	1874	Charles Mofras	
1874	1880	François Lavoley	
1880	1911	Georges Landry	Président du Conseil général
The comune was renamed Houlgate-Beuzeval in 1898 then Houlgate in 1905
1911	1913	Louis-Charles Tillaye (death)	Ministre des Travaux Publics
1913	1914	Léonard Pillu (death)	
1917	1919	Albert Février	
1919	1929	Louis Burnouf	
1929	1935	Georges Boulot	
1935	1945	Louis Pillu	
1945	1945	Georges Lelièvre	
1945	1947	Jean Rouget	Docteur
1947	1953	Louis Pillu	
1953	1976	Jules Cappeliez	
1976	2008	André Fauvel	Docteur
2008	2014	Jean-Claude Pupin	
2014	current	Jean-François Moisson	

=== Lords of Beuzeval ===
In 1066, Jean d'Aché is made lord of Beuzeval. In 1096, Eudes, the lord of Beuzeval is also made lord of Gonneville. In 1537, Marguerite Daché, lady of Beuzeval, married Jean Lebrun. In 1607, Thomas de Séran married Jeanne de Lesnerac and the lordship. The seigneurie went to Jacques de Séran, a protestant knight, in 1667. François takes the title on in 1694. He is made Captain of the coast guards in Dives. With Marie Eléonore, they founde the Ecolettes which possessed a funding (rente) of £80 to pay for a teacher. The children of Beuzeval, in small numbers, was admitted to the school. This funding exited until the French Revolution.

The de Morel family did not live in the Manoir de Beuzeval. Around 1720, Gaspard de Morel, knight, lord and sword general of the bailiwick of Caen, captain of the coast guards in Dives and High justice lord in Beuzeval. In 1724, his daughter, Anne de Morel married Jean Bart in Douville. Again in 1724, Gaspard de Morel sells his mill (then a privileged ownership) and two items of land to Pierre Pastey, a mill grinder.

The last family to hold the title was the des Boistard de Prémagny. Guillaume François, councillor to the king, lived in Rouen. He was squire, lord of Grangues and Vauville and sold land in Beuzeval. His daughter, Marie Françoise Delphine, married Pierre Armand de Saint-Philbert. Their son, Albéric de Saint-Philbert donated the field called le Clapier to build the current church of Saint-Aubin.

== Population ==
Historical population

Year	Pop.	±% p.a.
1793	204	—
1800	329	+7.07%
1806	343	+0.70%
1821	315	−0.57%
1831	310	−0.16%
1836	301	−0.59%
1841	288	−0.88%
1846	297	+0.62%
1851	270	−1.89%
1856	305	+2.47%
1861	345	+2.50%
1866	504	+7.88%
1872	515	+0.36%
1876	658	+6.32%
1881	1,011	+8.97%
1886	1,065	+1.05%
1891	1,110	+0.83%
1896	1,197	+1.52%
1901	1,274	+1.25%

Year	Pop.	±% p.a.
1906	1,204	−1.12%
1911	1,261	+0.93%
1921	1,132	−1.07%
1926	1,188	+0.97%
1931	1,231	+0.71%
1936	1,339	+1.70%
1946	1,837	+3.21%
1954	1,753	−0.58%
1962	1,588	−1.23%
1968	1,617	+0.30%
1975	1,655	+0.33%
1982	1,729	+0.63%
1990	1,654	−0.55%
1999	1,832	+1.14%
2007	1,933	+0.67%
2012	2,043	+1.11%
2017	1,873	−1.72%
2023	1,834	−0.35%

Source: EHESS and INSEE (1968-2023)

Houlgate is formally twinned with Axbridge, United Kingdom.

The inhabitants of Houlgate are called Houlgatais. Most Houlgatais come originally from Houlgate, Dives-sur-Mer, Cabourg, Calvados, and Paris.

== Sights ==
=== Le Manoir de Beuzeval ===
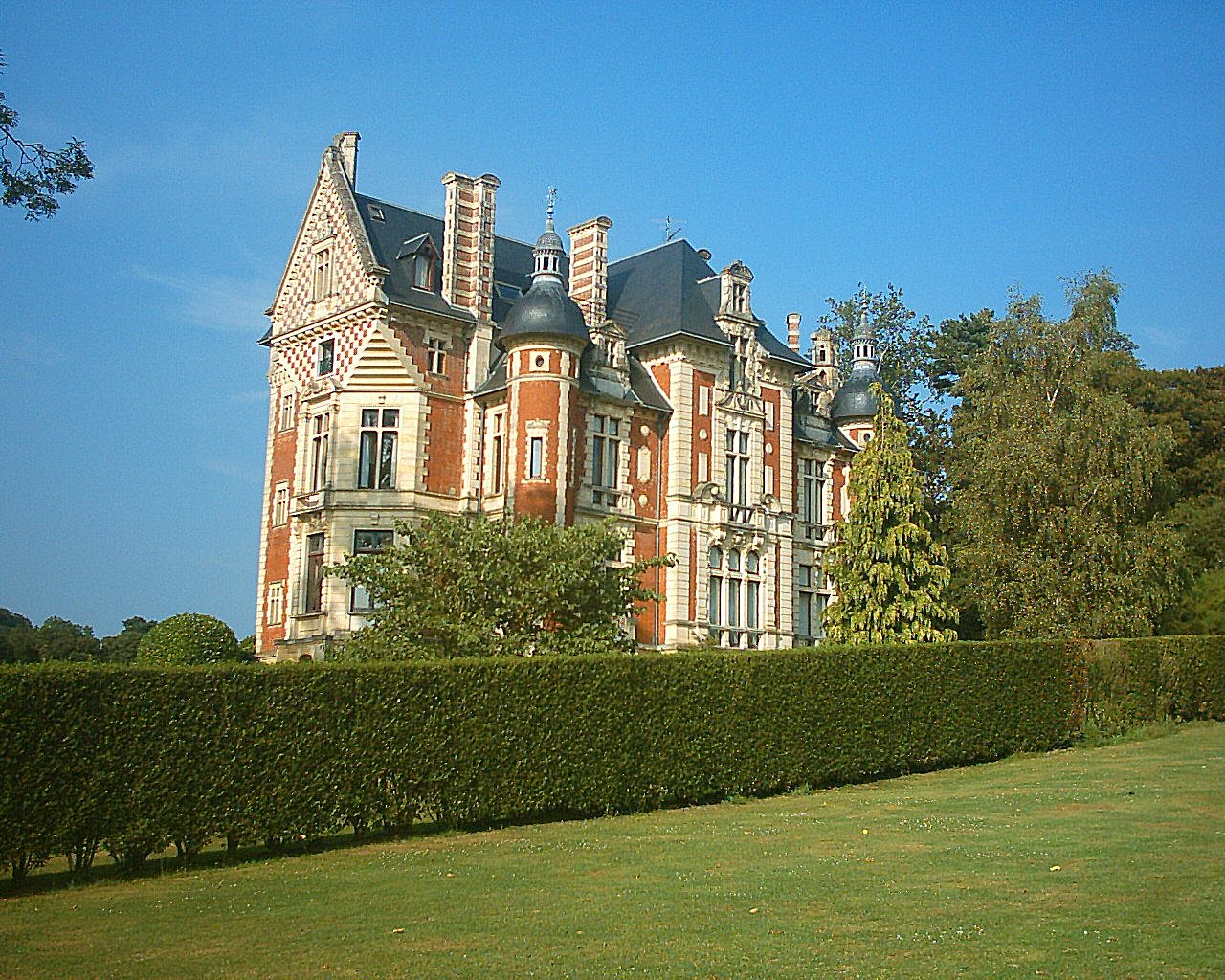
The Manor of Beuzeval in summer 2004

3 km (1.9 mi) from the seaside is the Manoir de Beuzeval, built during the 19th century. It is built on the site of an older, medieval castle.

It was called the Manoir d'Aché-Beuzeval, after the family of lords that reigned over these lands. The castle was built over a motte-and-bailey of 200 paces in diameter, the moat was 12 feet wide. It had a bridge and a brook held up by a dam and mill. The castle also possessed a chapel (dedicated to Sainte-Marie-Madeleine). With its land and dependencies, its garden and park, it had an area of approximately 100 ha. The castle was lived in and transformed by the Dachey (D'Aché), de Séran, de Saint-Laurens, de Morel and Boistard de Prémagny families. Its last occupant was Louis Henry d'Agier, mayor of Beuzeval from 1818 to 1831. Old and uncomfortable it ceased being lived in.

Previously on the territory of the commune of Gonneville-sur-Mer it is in 1825 that after consideration of the many lands of the castle that it was decided to retrace the communal borders to place the castle in Beuzeval. A cadastrial survey took place and the manor, a portion of the courtyard and the garden finally become part of Beuzeval (despite the residents being lords of Beuzeval and not Gonneville).

Between 1620 and 1640, the Château de Beuzeval was part of the fiefdom of the Aché.

In 1815 after the defeat at the Battle of Waterloo and the fall of the First Empire the region was occupied by Prussian troops.

In 1866, Victor Le Cesne, council member of Beuzeval, built a new luxurious manor house. Upon his death, his brother Jules took possession of the house. It was then lived in by the Viguier family and German occupants who damaged the building and then left it abandoned.

During World War II the Germans, once again, established their local headquarters in the Manoir de Beuzeval. After seriously deteriorating the building, it lay abandoned. It was subsequently tastefully converted into apartments and is now on the edge of a golf course with ponds inhabited by swans.

=== Le Château de Dramard ===
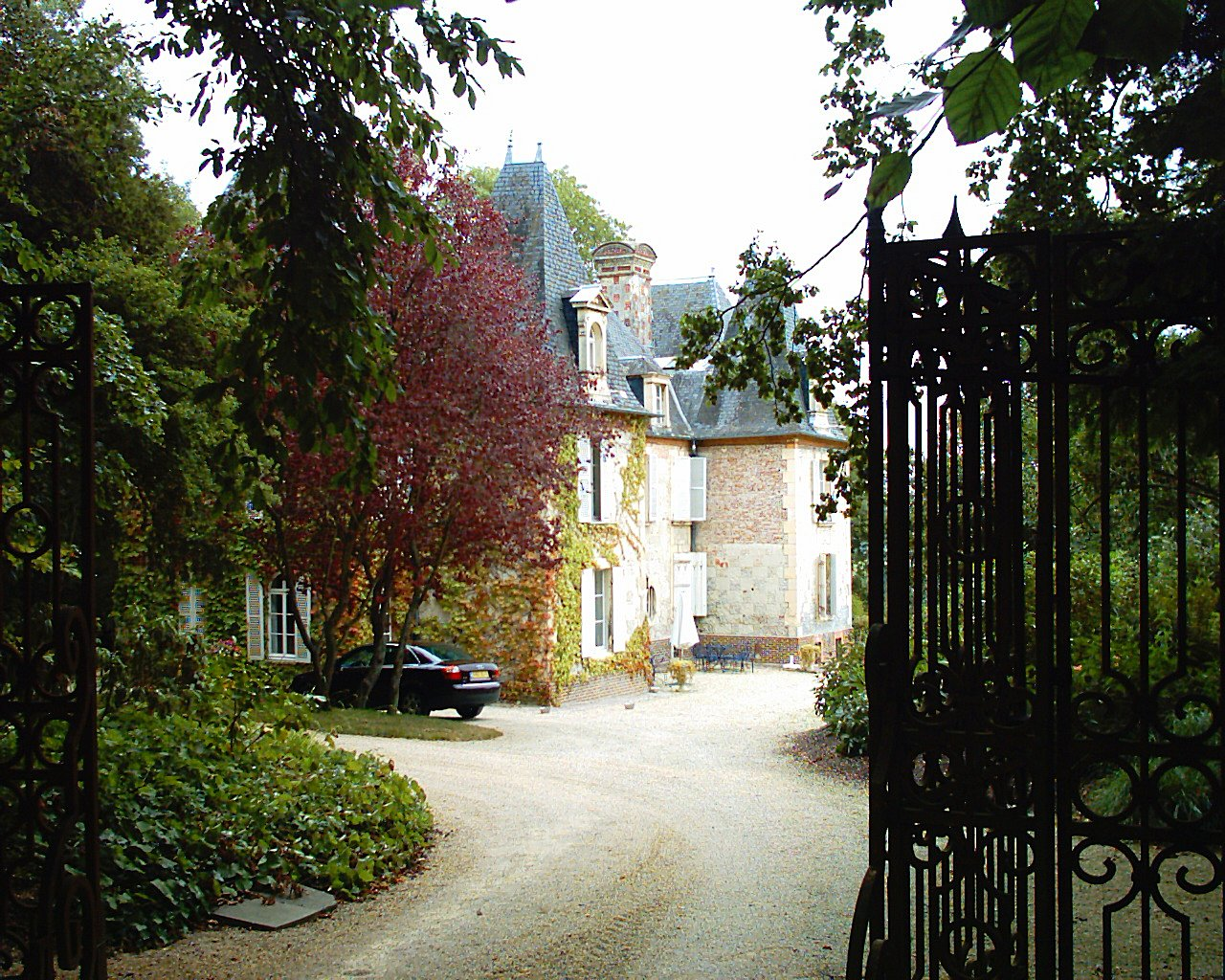
The Château de Dramard in 2004

Up the Chemin des Rouge Terres 2 km (1.2 mi) from Houlgate town centre is the Château de Dramard, a 17th-century manor house built in limestone with a large central section with two small wings. The castle was built on the site of an older, medieval castle, or Priory of Mennetot.

In 1616, the château was bought by Pierre de Dramard, then councillor to the King, who became sire of Gonneville, Beuzeval and Mennetot. In 1772, Pierre Louis Bonnet, Lord of Meautry, married demoiselle Gabrielle of Dramard. Pierre became mayor of Caen in 1791 then in 1792 was elected deputy of Calvados under the French Revolution. The château still stands and is now a bed and breakfast / hotel.

=== Grand Hôtel ===
The Grand Hotel was built in 1858 for Aubin Albin Vergnile, a financier and president of the Caisse Centrale de l'Industrie, under the direction of the architect Baumier. Initially the hotel had 120 bedrooms, which had been increased to 350 by 1896. The building includes two towers and a rotunda. Dinner was served early, usually around 6pm, and evenings usually ended at the casino. Guests accessed the casino by walking through a luxurious garden, now a mini golf.

In 1914, the hotel was requisitioned by the military authorities and was the main part of the temporary hospitals 23 and 24 of the Army 3rd corp. In 1917, the number of wounded reduced and the order of derequisition was signed. The hotel resumed its main purpose but Houlgate's golden age had ended. The big fortunes present before the great war no long came but newly found fortunes and a new clientele permitted the hotel to continue business.

In 1939 the hotel was once more requisitioned not by the military authorities but by the SNCF divisional offices in Strasbourg. In 1940 the hotel falls into the hands of the Germans and in 1941, the hotel manager, worried for his wine collection, sold his most prized bottles. After the war, the hotel tried to continue business but had to close. A short lived hotel opened in a portion of the Grand Hôtel building. The building is now divided into apartments.

=== Town hall ===
It was not until 1865 that the decision to build a town hall was made. The decision was made during a council meeting and also decided the construction of a boys school and part funding for a new church. Until then, the small municipal archives were kept by the mayor in office. At least some council meetings were held in some of the mayors' homes. When deciding to build a town hall it was stipulated that one room should be used exclusively by a library. Once built, two rooms houses the post office for letters and telegraphs (which were relayed to the semaphore on top of the Butte de Houlgate). A superb mahogany desk was donated to the commune in 1875 and was once used by the council as a meeting table; it is now the mayor's desk. In 1880 was created a permanent post office organisation and it moved to its own premises in 1895. The town hall was modified several times such as the building of a village hall. In June 1897, the municipal council voted to cover the walls of the village hall and to buy 150 chairs at a cost of 5.60₣ each. In 1980 the offices were extended, the council meeting room was extended, the vicarage was converted into a tourist office and its garden transformed into an open square.

=== Kursaal ===
During the 1870s a casino and baths called the Kursaal was built in Beuzeval-lès-Bains. It was built of wood on stilts and was situated between the William the Conqueror column and the PN83 level crossing. This complex of buildings, all in wooden planks, was built to carry two functions, a casino and baths as well as an entertainment centre for tourists. It was named the Kursaal, a word of Germanic origin, often translated in French and English as casino. Unlike Houlgate casino, there were gambling tables. It contained warm baths and a guarded beach but never succeeded in becoming a bona-fide casino. The Kursall was demolished by the Germans in 1941.

=== Hôtel Imbert ===
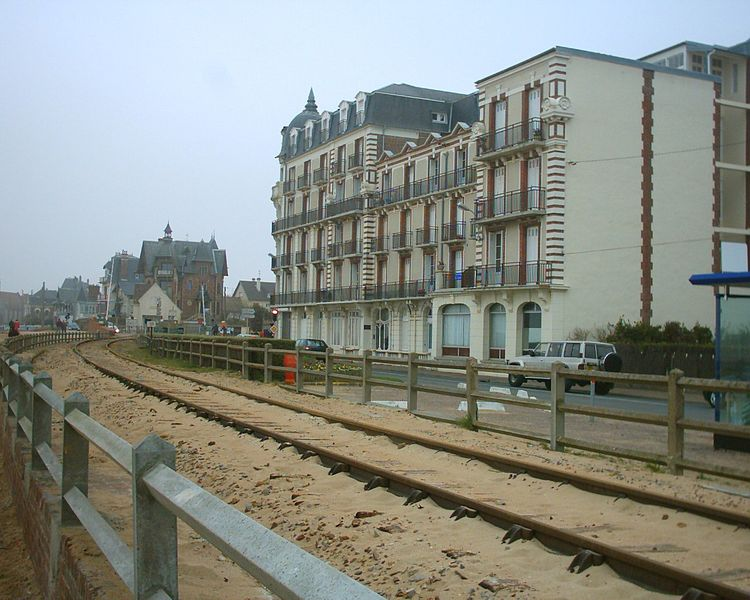
Hôtel Imbert in spring 2005

In 1877 was built the Hôtel Imbert, Houlgate's second grand hôtel, in Beuzeval-les-Bains. The hotel replaced the Mer-Imbert motel (Relais de l'hôtel de la Mer-Imbert) which had been built ten years earlier. In 1907, a rotunda was built, adding to the two wings. In 1921 a new wing to the building was built. The hotel was the most prestigious of Beuzeval-les-Bains and welcomed much rich Protestant gentry. Between 1914 and 1918, the Hôtel Imbert was requisitioned by the French Army's 3rd corp and used as a temporary military hospital. In 1928, the hotel was enlarged by the construction of a new level in the building's attic. Between 1939 and 1940 the hotel was once more used by the French army as a military hospital then occupied by the Germans. After the liberation, the hotel's owners, the Laout family tried to re-open it. They refurbished bedrooms in groups of ten and opened a restaurant. Their efforts were hampered in 1956 when they closed the hotel. Like many other hotels in Houlgate, it was divided into flats.

== Politics and urban regeneration ==
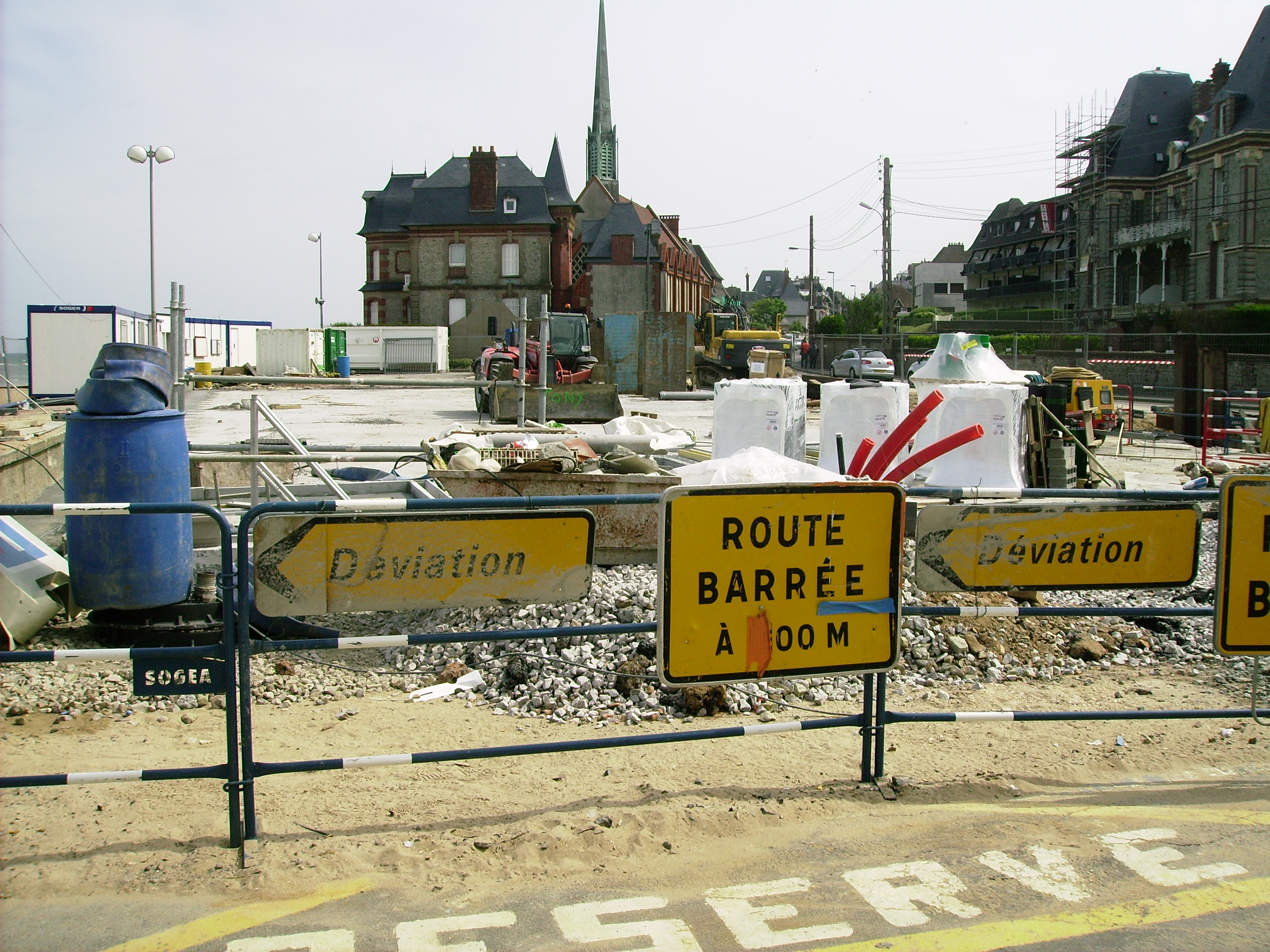
Work on the underground reservoir in May 2009.

Houlgate being a commune, also known as municipality it has its own mayor. The mayor, along with the municipal council, has power over the municipal budget and hands out building permits.

The council also has the power to create municipal acts. As such Houlgate currently has a no dog fouling policy act that is not applicable at low tide when dog owners are allowed to walk their dogs on the beach.

The council also allocates funds and pays the Direction Départementale de l'Equipment (D.D.E.) for the maintenance of council streets. Indeed, since the modernising of the town's streets the council has started to embellish the town by installing flower pots on most lamp posts as well as marble paving. This project started in late 1989 with the creation of a roundabout in front of the town hall. This new plaza features a fountain volcano.

During the mid-1990s, the council rebuilt the Rue du Général Leclerc and installed a one way system across the town centre.

The last road work project was the rebuilding of the Rue des Bains in late 2004. With the increase of the communal population during summer time, much of the commune's two water reservoirs are in great demand. In mid-July the council usually makes the decision to ban the unnecessary use of tap water.

An underground water basin was recently built along the Promenade Roland Garros preventing used water flowing into the English Channel. The project affects the three coastal communes of the Estuaire de la Dives Communité de Communes and aims to increase the English Channel's water quality.

== Economy ==
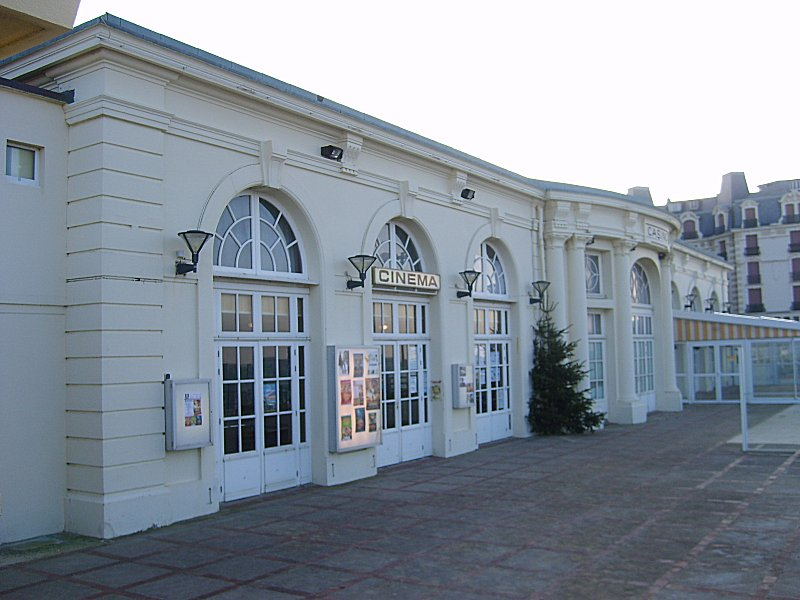
Casino's cinema.

The town of Houlgate is geared towards the tourism market. Many drinking establishments are open throughout the year. The Rue des Bains is Houlgate's main street and as such many bars and restaurants are open there.

Casino

Situated on Houlgate's seafront, the casino is the main establishment. Houlgate has seen two casino buildings on the site in front of the Grand Hôtel and added to the luxurious surroundings of the hotel. The first casino was built in 1860. It was a wooden construction covered in sheets of zinc. It was rented to the company owner of the Grand Hôtel and managed by a François Blanc, former manager of the casino of Monaco. It had several rooms for shows, games of luck, reading and French billiard. It existed until 1906.

The current casino was opened in 1907 and its looks have not changed much since its construction. Only the balustrade and iron lamp posts have disappeared. Built with tourism in mind, it offered concerts, balls, fêtes and other shows, welcoming theatre companies and at one had its own permanent company. The casino also had a round room for ladies and organised fayres for children.

The casino has American-style fruit/slot machines (as opposed to the British bandit), a boule table, a colonial-style bar, a restaurant and a seaside bar. The casino's nightclub 'Le Manhattan' closed in the early 1990s and the restaurant opened in the former club's room. The seaside bar sees many live performances throughout the summer season. The building also has a 150-seat cinema.

Shopping

The town has two small supermarkets (Proxy Market and 8 à huit) and a range of typical shops such as butcher, baker, fishmonger, and newsagent. The town has an indoor market, open Thursdays and Saturdays off season and every day during the summer. Many local shop keepers have a stall in the market. Due to the proximity of the fishing fleet at Dives-sur-Mer, fishmongers and market stall keepers sell fresh seafood, usually harvested in the early morning (depending on the tide).

Industry

Because the town was built for the purpose of tourism, Houlgate is not particularly known for its industry, nevertheless on 18 March 1852 the Patrelle Company was founded, specialising in aroma. Stews, sweets and ice creams are made around the world using Patrelle products.

== Personalities ==
- Émile Deschanel, writer and important politician.
- André Maurois (Emile Salomon Wilhelm Herzog), famous writer of his time.
- Émile Zola, famous writer.
- Marcel Proust, writer, used to go to the Lerossignol fleurist.
- William Taft, president of the United States (1908–1918).
- Cecile, Grand Duchess of Hesse
- Queen Victoria.
- Isabelle II, Queen of Spain.
- Alexandra Fyodorovna, wife to Nikolai II, empress of Russia.
- Roland Garros, famous aviator, who broke the altitude flying record on Houlgate beach.
- Claude Debussy, famous musician.
- Bréguet, aircraft builder, who owned a villa in Houlgate.
- Auguste and Louis Lumière, inventors of the moving cinema, who owned a villa in Houlgate.

== In popular culture ==
- Houlgate, including Villa Onexis pictured above, the former Kommandantur on boulevard de Saint Philbert, is the setting for some of the events in the novel Villa Normandie by Kevin Doherty.

== See also ==
- Côte Fleurie
- Communes of the Calvados department

== Bibliography ==
- Marcel Miocque (1993). Houlgate Sous L'Occupation, 1940-1944 Éditions Charles Corlet
- Marcel Miocque, Huguette Vernochet, Alain Bertaud et Lise Dassonville-Agron (2001). Houlgate entre mer et campagne. Éditions Charles Corlet ISBN 2-85480-976-9
- Marcel Miocque et Huguette Vernochet (2006). Houlgate regards sur le passé. Éditions du Petit Chemin ISBN 2-7546-0021-3
- Jean Bayle. Ports et plages de la Côte Fleurie ISBN 2-85480-625-5
- Direction Départemenale de l'Equipement du Calvados. (1996). Le Tour du Calvados en 80 Cartes.
- Marcel Renault. (1958) Houlgate-Beuzeval.
