= Jules Cappeliez =

French banker and land owner

Jules Cappeliez was a banker and land owner in Houlgate, France. He was elected mayor of Houlgate in 1953 and remained in service for twenty-four years.

He led several projects in the town, council housing, renovation of the Promenade Roland Garros, the creation of an intercommunal harbour union, construction of a new school canteen on Boulevard Saint-Philbert, the enlargement of the girls' school, construction of a new boys' school in 1962 followed by the enlargement of the école maternelle which opened in 1978.
