= Dives-Cabourg station =

Railway station in France

Coordinates: 49°17′11″N 0°6′27″W

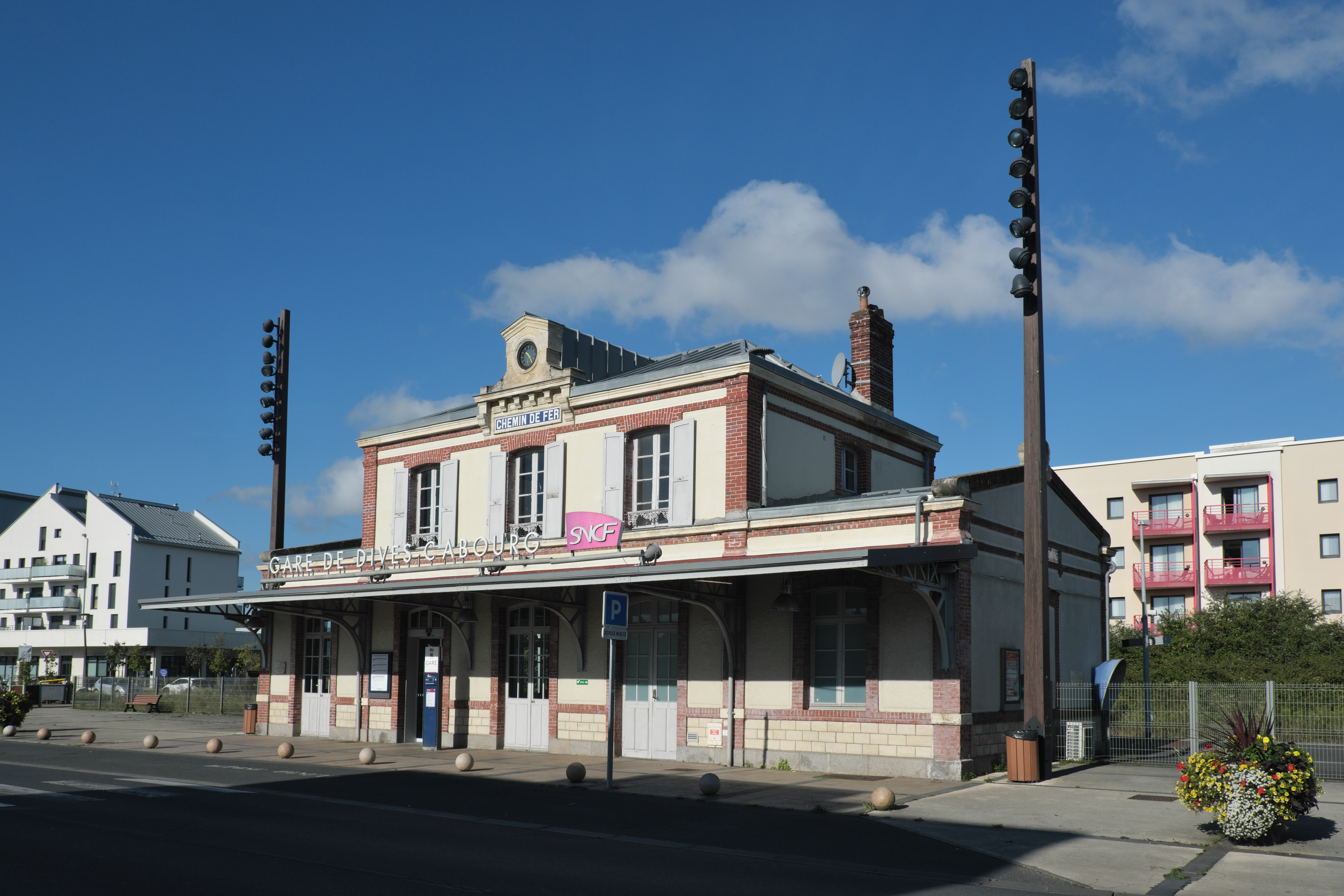
Dives-Cabourg's station building

Dives-Cabourg is the railway station for the towns of Dives-sur-Mer and Cabourg. The station is built in Ouest architecture and is a terminus for the Côte Fleurie branchline to Trouville-Deauville. The trains between Trouville-Deauville and Dives-Cabourg only run in summer.

The line from Mézidon opened in 1879 and extended to Houlgate in 1882. The line from Trouville-Deauville to Villers-sur-Mer and Houlgate opened two years later.

From 1892 to 1932, the station was served by the 600 mm (1 ft 11 5/8 in) narrow gauge railway of Chemins de fer du Calvados, linking it to Caen's Saint-Pierre station.

On Wednesday 12 May 2010, the goods yard building caught fire. The fire was noticed early on and extinguished, saving the building.

Preceding station	TER Normandie	Following station
Dives-sur-Mer-Port-Guillaume towards Trouville-Deauville	Seasonal	Terminus
