= Louis Burnouf =

Louis Burnouf was the step son of L.C. Tillaye, lawyer at the Court of Appeal, Court d'Appel, of Caen, he was elected mayor of Houlgate in 1919, he was re-elected in 1925. He directed the construction of the war memorial which was inaugurated in 1922.

He was worried about the water supply of Houlgate and participated in the construction of the aqueduct form Heuland to Houlgate.
