= Port of Dives-sur-Mer =

Coordinates: 49°17′37″N 0°5′57″W

The Port of Dives-sur-Mer, Port de Dives-sur-Mer, is the harbour of the Norman town of Dives-sur-Mer, France. It is from this harbour that William the Conqueror left for England to claim the throne.

== History ==
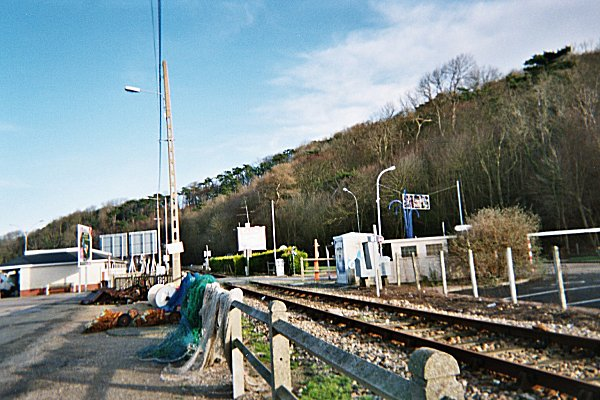
Fishing nets at the Port of Dives-sur-Mer.

The river Dives' estuary used to be larger than it is now. A large head of land protects the natural haven and gives adequate protection to light craft from the sea.

William the Conqueror chose the port of Dives as the starting point of his campaign to claim the throne of England. The port has always been known as a thriving port and under Louis XIV, one of his ministers Colbert, decided, in 1676 to begin remodel the area. During the 13th century, the port of Dives was a commercial place for Spanish and Portuguese merchants, their trade in leathers and wine from Cordoba interested the monks of the Saint-Etienne abbey of Caen who imposed import taxation. It is then that the Dives swamps were irrigated and drained and that the course of the Dives was modified. During the many centuries of war between France and England, the port showed a strategic and military importance.

Several naval battles occurred outside the port. On 29 May 1798, the frigate la Confiante and the corvette la Vésuve, having left Le Havre were pursued by three English ships and tried to gain shelter in the port of Dives. To prevent them from doing so, the English ships began to fire on the French for five hours. Finally, la Confiante, having sustained heavy damage, ran ashore on the pointe de Beuzeval, where it was burnt down.

Around 1860, project to enlarge the port came to fruition. Activity increased. In 1881, the port's registry logged 203 ship movements. Ships with a draft of up to 4 m regularly used the port which had 29 registered fishing boats. The port was then used by all types of ships, fishing, sailing and Cabotage.

The site as we know it today was built between 1845 and 1859, and modified in 1880. It was a port of call for merchant ships and fishing boats and also the place of regattas organised by the Count of Dramard. Sécrétan built Tréfimétaux steel works inside the large meander of the Dives in 1891. Three mast sailing ships provided the works with coal from England and copper from Le Havre.

As of 2006, four independent fishermen still sail from Dives-sur-Mer. They sell their seafood at port of Dives' fish market. Fish caught in the Baie de Seine range from sole to lemon sole, turbot, mackerel, bass, mussel and shrimp.

Beyond the fish dock, a lock protects Port Guillaume. South of the lock is a sailing club, the CAPAC, (Comité des Amis du Plein Air du Calvados).

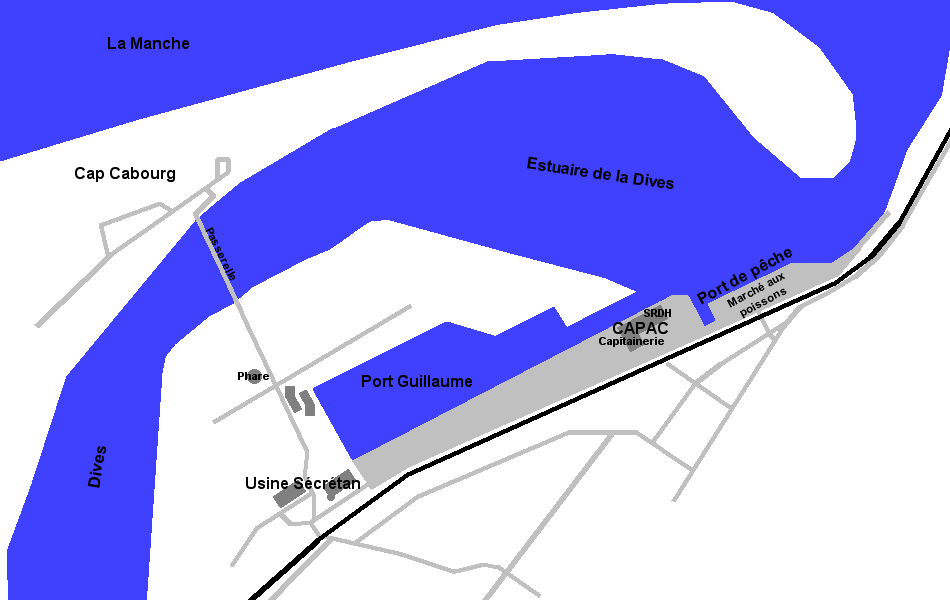
Plan of the Port of Dives-sur-Mer.

== Port Guillaume ==
Port Guillaume is a pleasure harbour built in the 1990s on the site of the Tréfimétaux steel works. The project was initiated by the Catherine Mamet construction and leisure group and built by Toffolutti. Catherine Mamet had built the marina as well as two buildings, consisting of two 5-storey mock Norman residential buildings. One of the buildings, built along one of the marina's dock walls, possesses a few shops. These two buildings were the only two to be built for more than ten years until the Groupe George V took over the project at the end of the 1990s. Although the "new" project was a success, with the construction of the lighthouse and of several more houses as well as a private railway station, it received bad publicity following a television report on M6's Capital business program. The program described how prices had been inflated to create a buzz around the project and how the group had neglected fitting guttering onto houses built in the notoriously rainy Normandy.

The harbour is capable of berthing 600 pleasure sailing ships as well as 192 additional moorings in the estuary and has a depth of 2 m. The marina was built with locks, open 6 hours per tide.
