= Dives (river) =

River in France

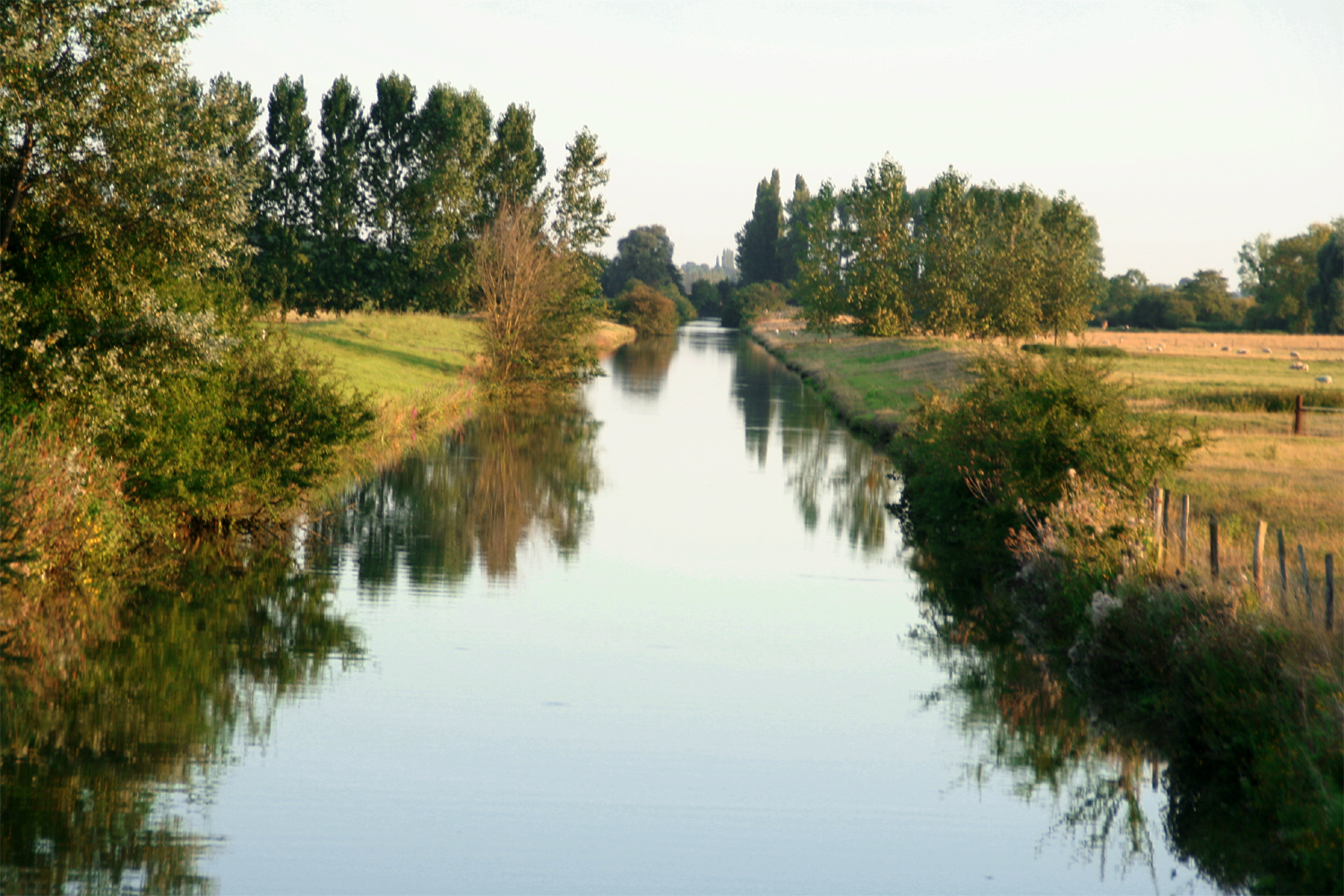

- Location within France Location within Normandy
- Native name: La Dives (French)

Location
- Country: France

Physical characteristics
- Source
  - location: Normandy
- Mouth
  - location: English Channel
  - coordinates: 49°17′50″N 0°5′14″W
- Length: 105 km (65 mi)

The Dives (French pronunciation: [div]; also Dive) is a 105 km long river in the Pays d'Auge, Normandy, France. The river also flows through the area known as the Plaine d'Argentan. It flows into the English Channel in Cabourg.

The source of the Dives is near Exmes, in the Orne department. The Dives flows generally north through the following departments and towns:

- Orne: Trun
- Calvados: Morteaux-Coulibœuf, Saint-Pierre-sur-Dives, Troarn, Dives-sur-Mer, Cabourg

The Dives is officially navigable up to the bridge at Putot-en-Auge although height restrictions apply. No yachts or fishing boats navigate the Dives further than the Pont de la Dives linking Dives-sur-Mer to Cabourg, 1 km from the river's estuary on the English Channel.

The last kilometre of the Dives is a large meander encircling a man-made harbour and the holiday resort of Port Guillaume (William's harbour). The river is prevented from reaching the English Channel by a kilometre long sand dune called Le cap Cabourg.

The estuary of the Dives was the site of one of William the Conqueror's most decisive victories in the year 1057, over the combined armies of France and Anjou. Later, in 1066, Duke William assembled his army and fleet for the invasion of England at the same location as the earlier victory.
