= Cabourg =

- Commune
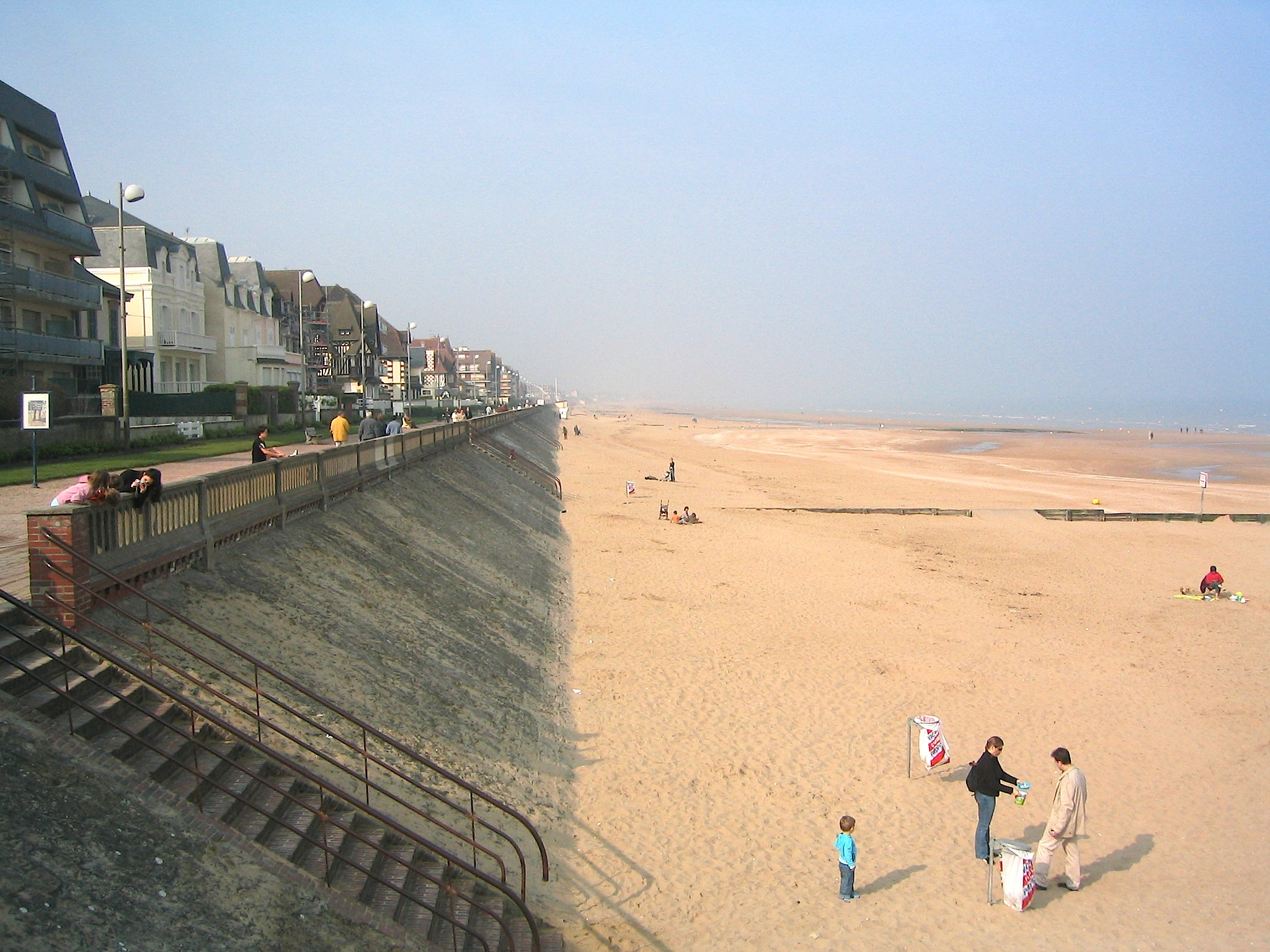
- Cabourg Beach

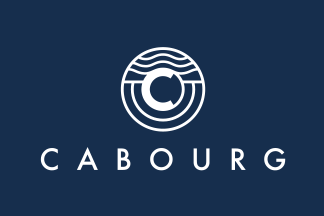
- Flag Coat of arms
- Location of Cabourg
- Location within France Location within Normandy
- Coordinates: 49°17′17″N 0°06′59″W
- Country: France
- Region: Normandy
- Department: Calvados
- Arrondissement: Lisieux
- Canton: Cabourg
- Intercommunality: Normandie-Cabourg-Pays d'Auge

Government
  - Mayor (2023–2026): Emmanuel Porcq
- Area^{1}: 5.52 km^{2} (2.13 sq mi)
- Elevation: 5 m (16 ft)
- Highest elevation: 15 m (49 ft)
- Lowest elevation: 0 m (0 ft)
- Population (2023): 3,725
  - Density: 675/km^{2} (1,750/sq mi)
- Time zone: UTC+01:00 (CET)
  - Summer (DST): UTC+02:00 (CEST)
- INSEE/Postal code: 14117 /14390
- ^{1} French Land Register data, which excludes lakes, ponds, glaciers > 1 km^{2} (0.386 sq mi or 247 acres) and river estuaries.

Cabourg (French pronunciation: [kabuʁ]; Norman: Cabouorg) is a commune in the Calvados department, region of Normandy, France. Cabourg is on the coast of the English Channel, at the mouth of the river Dives. The back country is a plain, favourable to the culture of cereal. The town sits on the Côte Fleurie (Flowery Coast) and its population increases by over 40,000 during the summer.

== Geography ==
Cabourg is located on the north of France between Caen and Deauville, part of the Côte Fleurie. The town is on the Dives river, across from Dives-sur-Mer.

On 1 January 2017, the town was transferred from the Arrondissement of Caen to that of Lisieux.

=== Climate ===
Cabourg has an Oceanic climate with mild summers and cool winters. The proximity of the sea limits large variations in temperature and creates winters without much frost and summers without excessive heat. Wind is frequent especially on the beach.

Climate data for Cabourg
Month	Jan	Feb	Mar	Apr	May	Jun	Jul	Aug	Sep	Oct	Nov	Dec	Year
Mean daily maximum °F	45.1	46	50.9	54.9	61.3	66.6	70.9	71.1	67.5	60.6	51.6	46.6	57.7
Daily mean °F	40.1	40.8	44.4	47.8	54	58.6	63	63	59.2	53.4	45.9	41.7	50.9
Mean daily minimum °F	35.2	35.4	37.8	40.8	45.9	50.7	54.1	54.1	51.1	46.2	40.3	36.9	44.1
Average precipitation inches	2.50	2.27	2.22	1.80	2.30	2.06	1.88	1.83	2.42	2.67	3.34	2.7	27.98
Mean daily maximum °C	7.3	8	10.5	12.7	16.3	19.2	21.6	21.7	19.7	15.9	10.9	8.1	14.3
Daily mean °C	4.5	4.9	6.9	8.8	12	14.8	17	17	15.1	11.9	7.7	5.4	10.5
Mean daily minimum °C	1.8	1.9	3.2	4.9	7.7	10.4	12.3	12.3	10.6	7.9	4.6	2.7	6.7
Average precipitation mm	63.5	57.6	56.3	45.6	58.4	52.3	47.7	46.5	61.4	67.7	84.9	69	710.8
Source: Infoclimat.fr

== History ==
It was from Cabourg that William the Conqueror drove the troops of Henry I of France back into the sea in 1058.

According to Marcel Proust's biographer George D. Painter:

But the modern Cabourg began in 1853 with the arrival of two Paris financiers in search of a new site for a luxurious watering-place. The railway age had made the Normandy coast accessible to holiday-makers; Dieppe, Trouville and Deauville to the east had already been discovered; but here the adventurers found a virgin expanse of barren dunes and level sea-sands ripe for development. By the 1880s an unreal city of villas and hotels had arisen, in a semicircle whose diameter was the seafront, whose centre was the Grand Hotel, and whose radii were traced by a fan-work of avenues shaded with limes and Normandy poplars.

== Population ==
Historical population
Year	Pop.	±% p.a.
1968	3,067	—
1975	3,308	+1.09%
1982	3,238	−0.31%
1990	3,355	+0.44%
1999	3,520	+0.53%
2007	4,027	+1.70%
2012	3,712	−1.62%
2017	3,650	−0.34%
2023	3,725	+0.34%
Source: INSEE

Cabourg contains a large amount of secondary/vacation residences. In 2020, there were 10,867 homes with 79.7% of them being classified as "Secondary residences and occasional accommodations".

== Culture ==
Each year in June, Cabourg hosts the International Festival of the Romantic Movie.

== Sport ==
SU Dives-Cabourg is the local football team, after the merger of AS Cabourg with Sport Union Divaise in May 2016, it is based in neighbouring Dives-sur-Mer.

== Personalities ==
Cabourg is famous for being Marcel Proust's favorite vacation place at the beginning of the 20th century; it is the inspiration for Balbec, the seaside resort in Proust's In Search of Lost Time.

- Jean-Pierre Andréani
- Charles Bertrand (1884, Avesnes-sur-Helpe–1954)
- Sandrine Bonnaire
- Bruno Coquatrix (1910, Ronchin–1979)
- Jean-François Dubos
- Tristan Duval
- Adolphe d'Ennery (1811–1899)
- Jean-Louis Ezine (^{*}1948, Cabourg)
- Philippe Fourastié
- Jacques Freimuller
- Gilgogué
- André Lenormand
- Corinne Lepage
- Charles-Gaston Levadé (1869–1948),
- Cecil Michaelis
- René-Xavier Prinet (1861, Vitry-le-François–1946)
- Pierre Ucciani (1851, Ajaccio–1939)
- Paul Giroud (French physician, summer residence)

== International relations ==
Cabourg has relations with the following cities:

- (United States) Atlantic City, USA
- Bad Homburg, Germany
- Bromont, Canada
- Chur, Switzerland
- Jūrmala, Latvia
- Mayrhofen, Austria
- Mondorf-les-Bains, Luxembourg
- Oussouye, Senegal
- Salcombe, in Devon, United Kingdom
- Spa, Belgium
- Terracina, Italy

== Popular culture ==
- Cabourg is the model for Balbec, the fictional seaside town in Marcel Proust's À la recherche du temps perdu.
- The Cabourg area, including the small hamlet of Varaville, is the setting for some of the events in the novel Villa Normandie (Endeavour Press, 2015) by Kevin Doherty.
