= Gonneville-sur-Mer =

- Commune
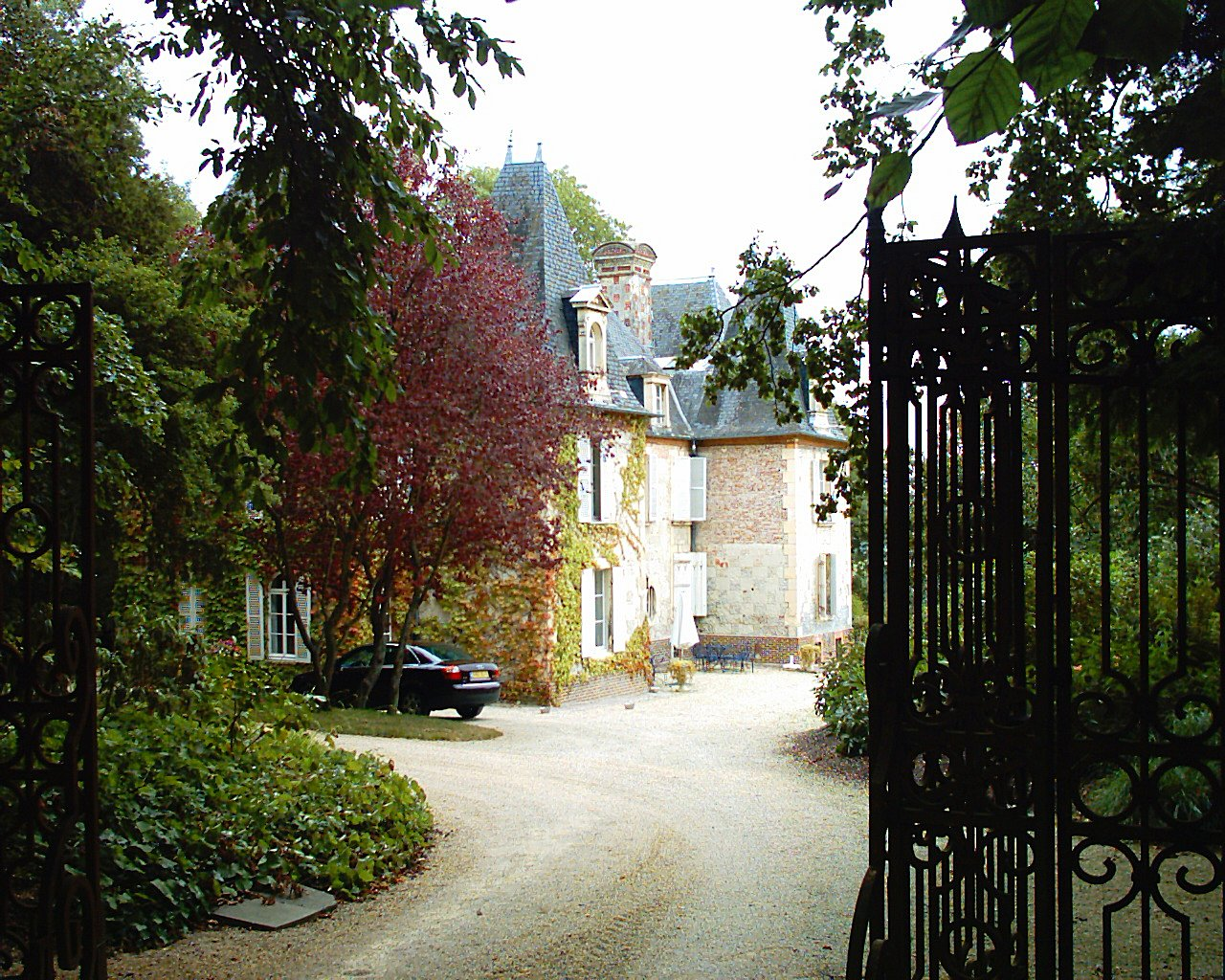
- Chateau of Dramard (now a hotel)
- Location of Gonneville-sur-Mer
- Location within France Location within Normandy
- Coordinates: 49°16′54″N 0°02′20″W
- Country: France
- Region: Normandy
- Department: Calvados
- Arrondissement: Lisieux
- Canton: Cabourg
- Intercommunality: CC Normandie-Cabourg-Pays d'Auge

Government
  - Mayor (2020–2026): Bernard Hoyé
- Area^{1}: 12.38 km^{2} (4.78 sq mi)
- Elevation: 120 m (390 ft)
- Highest elevation: 149 m (489 ft)
- Lowest elevation: 5 m (16 ft)
- Population (2023): 652
  - Density: 52.7/km^{2} (136/sq mi)
- Time zone: UTC+01:00 (CET)
  - Summer (DST): UTC+02:00 (CEST)
- INSEE/Postal code: 14305 /14510
- ^{1} French Land Register data, which excludes lakes, ponds, glaciers > 1 km^{2} (0.386 sq mi or 247 acres) and river estuaries.

Gonneville-sur-Mer (French pronunciation: [ɡɔnvil syʁ mɛʁ]) is a commune in the Calvados department in the Normandy region in northwestern France.

== Population ==
Historical population
| Year | Pop. | ±% p.a. |
|---|---|---|
| 1968 | 462 | — |
| 1975 | 331 | −4.65% |
| 1982 | 399 | +2.71% |
| 1990 | 504 | +2.96% |
| 1999 | 564 | +1.26% |
| 2007 | 585 | +0.46% |
| 2012 | 682 | +3.12% |
| 2017 | 673 | −0.27% |
| 2023 | 652 | −0.53% |
Source: INSEE

== See also ==
- Communes of the Calvados department
