= Villers-sur-Mer =

Villers-sur-mer
- Commune
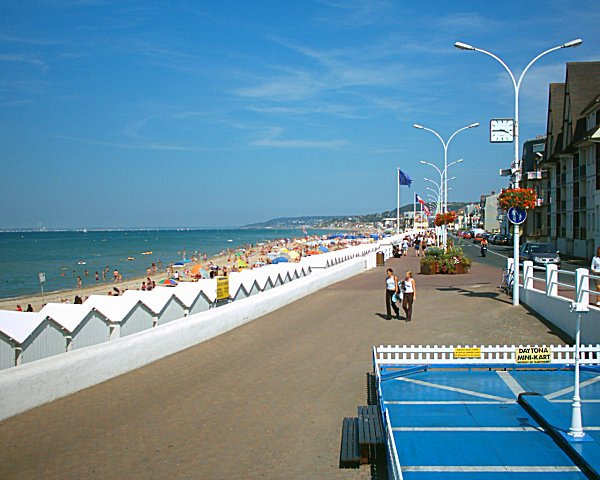
- Avenue de la République

- Coat of arms
- Location of Villers-sur-mer
- Location within France Location within Normandy
- Coordinates: 49°19′17″N 0°00′18″W
- Country: France
- Region: Normandy
- Department: Calvados
- Arrondissement: Lisieux
- Canton: Pont-l'Évêque
- Intercommunality: CC Cœur Côte Fleurie

Government
  - Mayor (2024–2026): Chhun-Na Lenglart
- Area^{1}: 8.99 km^{2} (3.47 sq mi)
- Elevation: 38 m (125 ft)
- Highest elevation: 136 m (446 ft)
- Lowest elevation: 3 m (9.8 ft)
- Population (2023): 2,440
  - Density: 271/km^{2} (703/sq mi)
- Time zone: UTC+01:00 (CET)
  - Summer (DST): UTC+02:00 (CEST)
- INSEE/Postal code: 14754 /14640
- ^{1} French Land Register data, which excludes lakes, ponds, glaciers > 1 km^{2} (0.386 sq mi or 247 acres) and river estuaries.

Villers-sur-Mer (French pronunciation: [vilɛʁ syʁ mɛʁ]) is a commune in the Calvados department in Normandy, northwestern France.

== Geography ==
The commune is located on the French coast of the English Channel, on the Côte Fleurie, between Deauville and Houlgate, approximately 200 km from Paris.

It is the northernmost French commune through which falls the Prime meridian of the world. The latter is represented on the seafront promenade with a blue mark on the ground and on the parapet. This mark is positioned 32 metres west of the actual meridian in use today, the IERS Reference Meridian.

== Paleontology ==
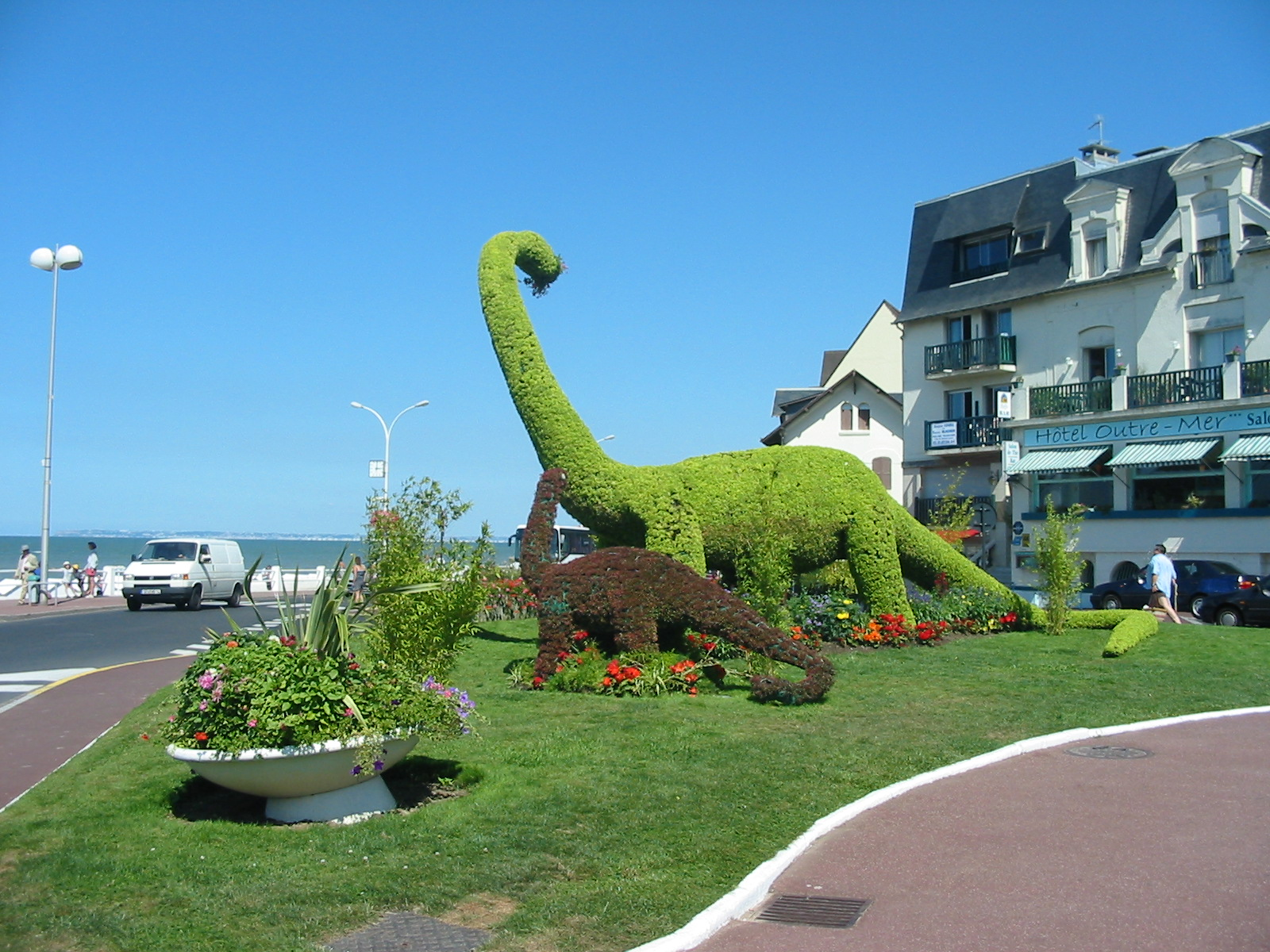
Topiary dinosaurs address the sea

Numerous fossils of vertebrates were found in the Jurassic (Upper Callovian) Vaches-Noires cliffs in Villers-sur-Mer. Remains include marine reptiles, in particular teleosaurids (Steneosaurus heberti) and metriorhynchids, coelacanths, a huge suspension-feeding fish Leedsichthys and dinosaurs. A 2.5 m-long metriorhynchid skeleton, assigned to Metriorhynchus cf. superciliosus, is unique due to the preserved undigested food in its stomach: the remains of invertebrates and gill apparatus of Leedsichthys. This content indicates that large fishes were not the main diet of these thalattosuchians and this individual likely devoured already dead Leedsichthys. It is also widely known by ammonite specialists.

Villers-sur-Mere is known for the large topiary dinosaurs facing the sea from the garden of the office of tourism. In certain years, a baby dinosaur is added to the garden. There is a small museum in the enclosure of the office of tourism, which has an outline of the resources and discoveries, along with the Paléospace l'Odyssée, which covers topics as varied as the Greenwich Meridian, the nature and history of the marshland surrounding the town, and fossils found in the nearby Vaches Noires cliffs.

== History ==
It seems that Villers-sur-Mer (then known as Villers) was more akin to a group of hamlets during the early 19th century. According to the Cassini map (drawn in the 18th century), Villers at that time was made up of a church, two farms (La Motte and Fontaine), and a castle.

== Population ==
Historical population
Year	Pop.	±% p.a.
1968	1,669	—
1975	1,769	+0.83%
1982	1,853	+0.66%
1990	2,019	+1.08%
1999	2,318	+1.55%
2007	2,597	+1.43%
2012	2,702	+0.80%
2017	2,644	−0.43%
2023	2,440	−1.33%
Source: INSEE

== Curiosity ==
On the beach of Villers-sur-Mer (last stretch of rue Alfred Feine), the famous last scene of the first film by François Truffaut was shot: Les Quatre Cent Coups ends with a freeze frame of its boy hero running towards the sea.

n 1978, Villiers-Sur-Mer was twinned with the English village of Wickham.

== Transportation ==
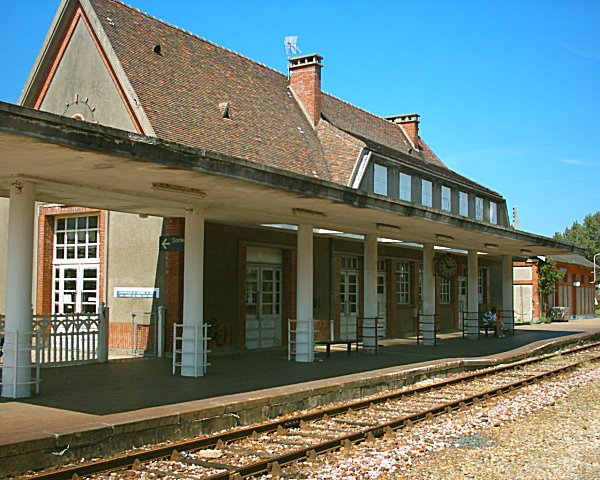
Railway station

Villers-sur-Mer station is on the line from Deauville to Dives-sur-Mer. The station building is no longer open but train services operate year-round on weekends, and also on weekdays during the summer.

== See also ==
- Communes of the Calvados department
- Adélaïde-Louise d'Eckmühl de Blocqueville (1815–1892), salon holder, died in Villers-sur-Mer.
