= Dives-sur-Mer =

- Commune
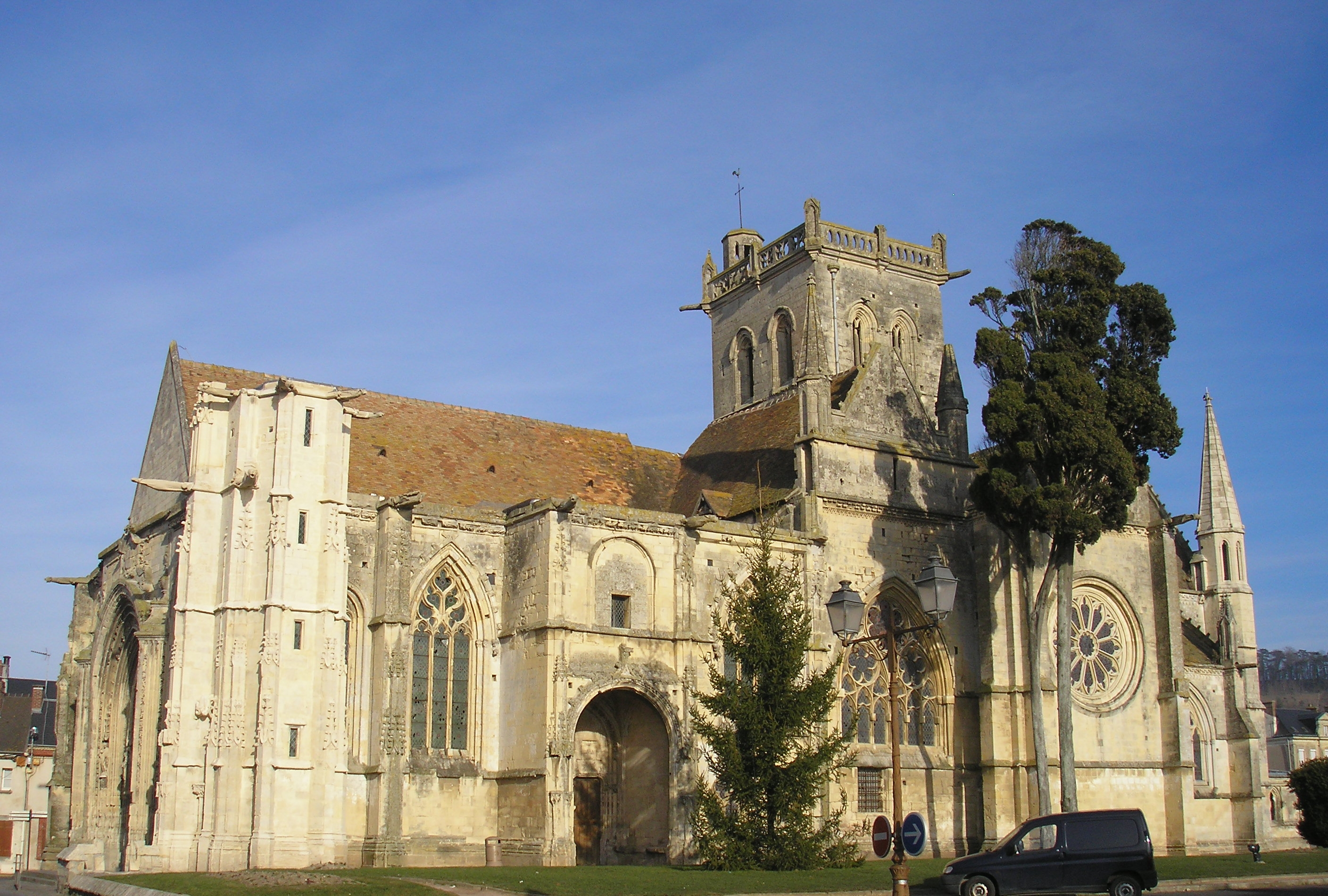
- 13th and 14th Century church in Dives-sur-Mer

- Coat of arms
- Location of Dives-sur-Mer
- Location within France Location within Normandy
- Coordinates: 49°17′11″N 0°06′00″W
- Country: France
- Region: Normandy
- Department: Calvados
- Arrondissement: Lisieux
- Canton: Cabourg
- Intercommunality: CC Normandie-Cabourg-Pays d'Auge

Government
  - Mayor (2020–2026): Pierre Mouraret
- Area^{1}: 6.46 km^{2} (2.49 sq mi)
- Elevation: 4 m (13 ft)
- Highest elevation: 135 m (443 ft)
- Lowest elevation: 0 m (0 ft)
- Population (2023): 5,122
  - Density: 793/km^{2} (2,050/sq mi)
- Time zone: UTC+01:00 (CET)
  - Summer (DST): UTC+02:00 (CEST)
- INSEE/Postal code: 14225 /14160
- ^{1} French Land Register data, which excludes lakes, ponds, glaciers > 1 km^{2} (0.386 sq mi or 247 acres) and river estuaries.

Dives-sur-Mer (French pronunciation: [div syʁ mɛʁ], literally Dives on Sea; Norman: Dives sus Mé) is a commune in the Calvados department in Normandy in northwestern France.

== History ==
It was from the harbour of Dives-sur-Mer that William the Conqueror set out on the Norman Conquest of England in 1066. On the night before sailing to Pevensey Bay for battle, William and 475 barons and knights from Normandy, Flanders and Brittany attended Dives-sur-Mer church for Mass and prayers.

After much research in the 18th century, the French government placed a monumental plaque in the church listing by name all 475 companions of the Conqueror on that great mission. Book One of One Family's Journey Through Ten Centuries, by William Lilly, contains analysis at Appendix d, p. 1395 of the efforts to determine who those knights were. The medieval wooden market hall and the 13th-14th-century church are the main attractions of the town.

== Population ==
Historical population

Year	Pop.	±% p.a.
1793	370	—
1800	349	−0.83%
1806	409	+2.68%
1821	418	+0.15%
1831	589	+3.49%
1836	541	−1.69%
1841	518	−0.87%
1846	503	−0.59%
1851	539	+1.39%
1856	589	+1.79%
1861	656	+2.18%
1866	854	+5.42%
1872	826	−0.55%
1876	871	+1.34%
1881	1,001	+2.82%
1886	1,097	+1.85%
1891	1,441	+5.61%
1896	1,720	+3.60%
1901	3,450	+14.94%

Year	Pop.	±% p.a.
1906	3,453	+0.02%
1911	3,614	+0.92%
1921	4,233	+1.59%
1926	4,460	+1.05%
1931	5,577	+4.57%
1936	5,300	−1.01%
1946	5,046	−0.49%
1954	5,893	+1.96%
1962	6,258	+0.75%
1968	6,299	+0.11%
1975	5,872	−1.00%
1982	5,508	−0.91%
1990	5,344	−0.38%
1999	5,812	+0.94%
2007	5,890	+0.17%
2012	5,867	−0.08%
2017	5,546	−1.12%
2023	5,122	−1.32%

Source: EHESS and INSEE (1968-2023)

== Transport ==
Dives-sur-Mer is served by two stations on the railway line from Deauville to Dives-sur-Mer: Dives-Cabourg and Dives-sur-Mer-Port-Guillaume. Train services operate year-round at weekends as well as on weekdays during the summer season. Dives is also on line no. 20 of the Calvados bus company Bus Verts du Calvados.

== Sport ==
SU Dives-Cabourg is a football club, that was formed in 1929 and plays at Stade André Heurtematte.

== See also ==
- Communes of the Calvados department
- Church of Notre-Dame de Dives-sur-Merent
