= List of SNCF stations in Centre-Val de Loire =

This article contains a list of current SNCF railway stations in the Centre-Val de Loire region of France.

== Cher (18) ==
- Avord
- Bengy
- Bigny
- Bourges
- Châteauneuf-sur-Cher
- Foëcy
- La Guerche-sur-l'Aubois
- Lunery
- Marmagne
- Mehun-sur-Yèvre
- Nérondes
- Saint-Amand-Montrond-Orval
- Saint-Florent-sur-Cher
- Saint-Germain-du-Puy
- Urçay
- Vierzon-Forges
- Vierzon-Ville

== Eure-et-Loir (28) ==
- Amilly-Ouerray
- Arrou
- Auneau
- Bailleau-le-Pin
- Bonneval
- Brou
- Chartres
- Châteaudun
- Château-Gaillard
- Cloyes
- Courtalain-Saint-Pellerin
- Courville-sur-Eure
- Dreux
- Épernon
- Illiers-Combray
- Jouy
- La Loupe
- Lucé
- Magny-Blandainville
- Maintenon
- Marchezais-Broué
- Nogent-le-Rotrou
- Pontgouin
- Saint-Aubin-Saint-Luperce
- Saint-Piat
- La Taye
- Toury
- La Villette-Saint-Prest
- Voves

== Indre (36) ==
- Argenton-sur-Creuse
- Chabenet
- Chabris
- Châteauroux
- Éguzon
- La Gauterie
- Issoudun
- Lothiers
- Luant
- Luçay-le-Mâle
- Neuvy-Pailloux
- Reuilly
- Sainte-Lizaigne
- Valençay
- Varennes-sur-Fouzon

== Indre-et-Loire (37) ==
- Amboise
- Azay-le-Rideau
- Azay-sur-Cher
- Ballan
- Bleré-La Croix
- Chambourg
- La Chapelle-sur-Loire
- Château-Renault
- Chenonceaux
- Chinon
- Cinq-Mars-la-Pile
- Cormery
- Courçay-Tauxigny
- La Douzillère
- Druye
- Esvres
- Joué-lès-Tours
- Langeais
- Limeray
- Loches
- Maillé
- La Membrolle-sur-Choisille
- Mettray
- Monnaie
- Montbazon
- Montlouis
- Monts
- Neuillé-Pont-Pierre
- Noizay
- Notre-Dame-d'Oé
- Port-Boulet
- Port-de-Piles
- Reignac
- Rivarennes
- Saint-Antoine-du-Rocher
- Sainte-Maure-Noyant
- Saint-Genouph
- Saint-Martin-le-Beau
- Saint-Paterne
- Saint-Patrice
- Saint-Pierre-des-Corps
- Savonnières
- Tours
- Veigné
- Véretz-Montlouis
- Villeperdue

== Loiret (45) ==
- Artenay
- Les Aubrais
- Baule
- Beaugency
- Boisseaux
- Briare
- Cercottes
- Chaingy-Fourneaux-Plage
- La Chapelle-Saint-Mesmin
- Chevilly
- Dordives
- Ferrières–Fontenay
- La Ferté-Saint-Aubin
- Gien
- Malesherbes
- Meung-sur-Loire
- Montargis
- Nogent-sur-Vernisson
- Orléans
- Saint-Ay
- Saint-Cyr-en-Val

== Loir-et-Cher (41) ==
- Blois
- La Chaussée-Saint-Victor
- Chissay-en-Touraine
- Chouzy-sur-Cisse
- Faubourg-d'Orléans
- La Ferté-Imbault
- Fréteval-Morée
- Gièvres
- Lamotte-Beuvron
- Loreux
- Menars
- Mennetou-sur-Cher
- Mer
- Montrichard
- Nouan-le-Fuzelier
- Onzain
- Pezou
- Pruniers
- Les Quatre-Roues
- Romorantin-Blanc-Argent
- Saint-Aignan-Noyers
- Saint-Amand-de-Vendôme
- Salbris
- Selles-Saint-Denis
- Selles-sur-Cher
- Suèvres
- Theillay
- Thésée
- Vendôme
- Vendôme-Villiers-sur-Loir
- Veuves-Monteaux
- Villefranche-sur-Cher
- Villeherviers

== See also ==
- SNCF
- List of SNCF stations for SNCF stations in other regions
