= Onzain station =

Railway station in Onzain, France

Coordinates: 47°29′31″N 1°11′10″E

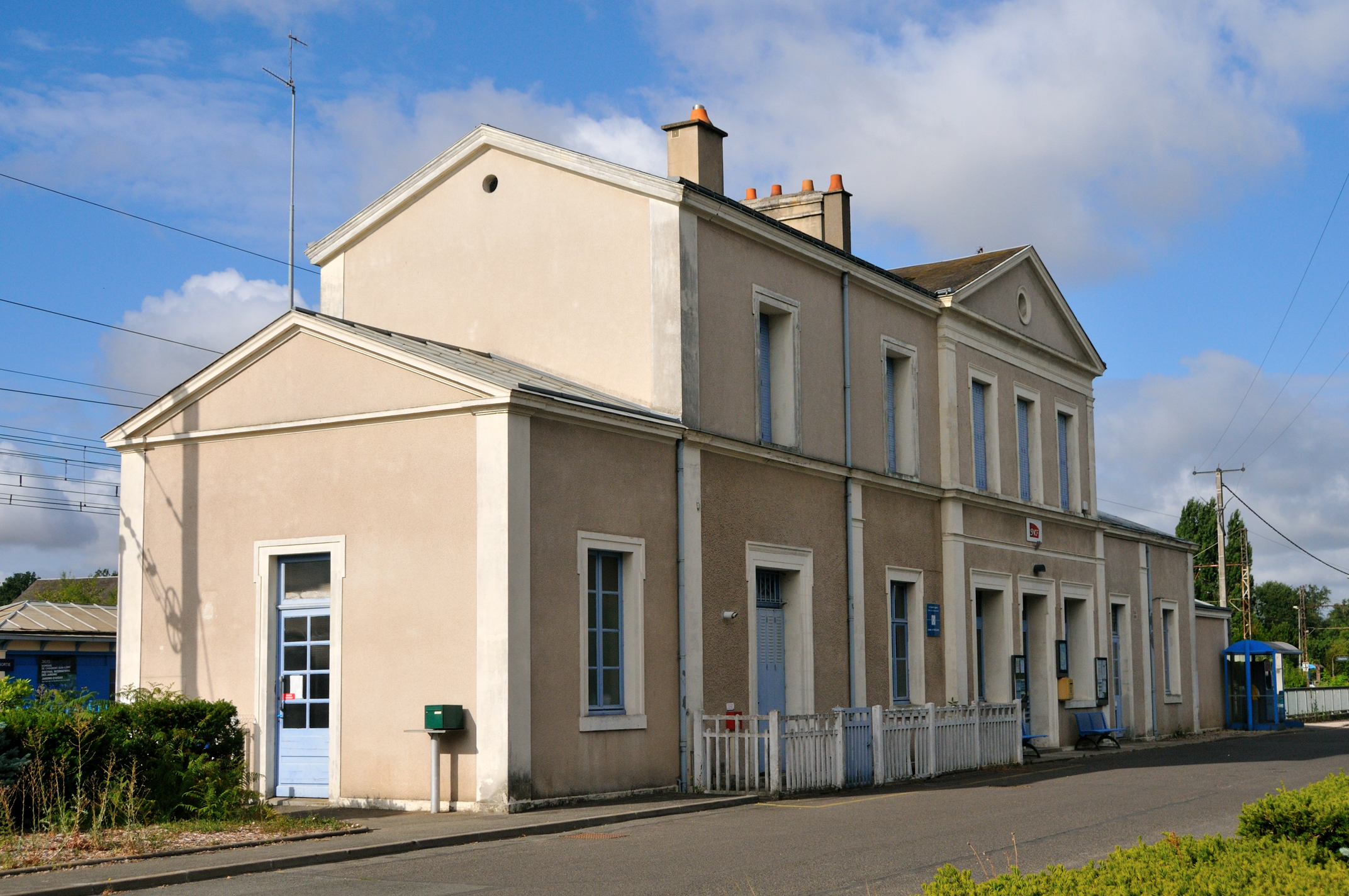
Onzain station

Gare d'Onzain is a railway station serving the town Onzain, Loir-et-Cher department, central France. It is situated on the Paris–Bordeaux railway.

== Services ==
The station is served by regional trains (TER Centre-Val de Loire) to Tours, Blois and Orléans.

Preceding station	Le Réseau Rémi	Following station
Veuves-Monteaux towards Tours	2.1	Chouzy-sur-Cisse towards Orléans
