= Amboise station =

Railway station in Amboise, France

Coordinates: 47°25′17″N 0°58′52″E

Amboise
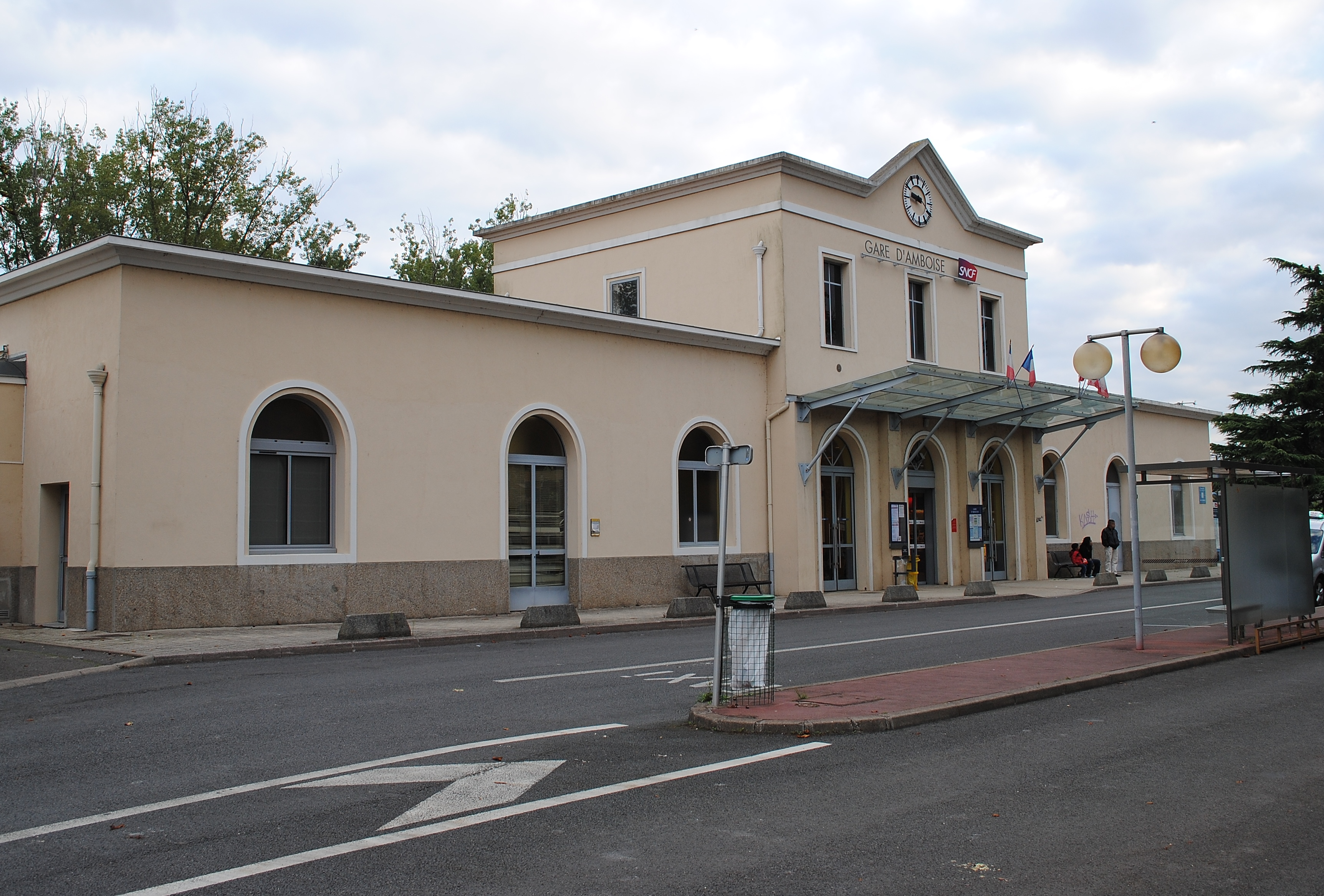
- Amboise station passenger building in 2013.

General information
- Location: Rue Jules-Ferry; 37400 Amboise; Indre-et-Loire; France
- Elevation: 61 metres (200 ft)
- Owner: SNCF
- Operator: SNCF
- Line: Paris–Bordeaux railway
- Distance: 212.228 kilometres (131.872 mi)
- Platforms: 2
- Tracks: 2 (+ service tracks)
- Train operators: Interloire; TER Centre-Val de Loire

Other information
- Station code: 87574343

History
- Opened: 2 April 1846

Passengers
- 2016: 489,799
Location

Amboise station (French: Gare d'Amboise) is a railway station serving the town Amboise, Indre-et-Loire department, central France. It is situated on the Paris–Bordeaux railway.

== Services ==
The station is served by regional trains (TER Centre-Val de Loire) to Tours, Blois and Orléans.

Preceding station	Le Réseau Rémi	Following station
Noizay towards Tours	2.1	Limeray towards Orléans

== See also ==
- List of SNCF stations in Centre-Val de Loire
