= Regio 2N =

French family of electric multiple unit trainsets

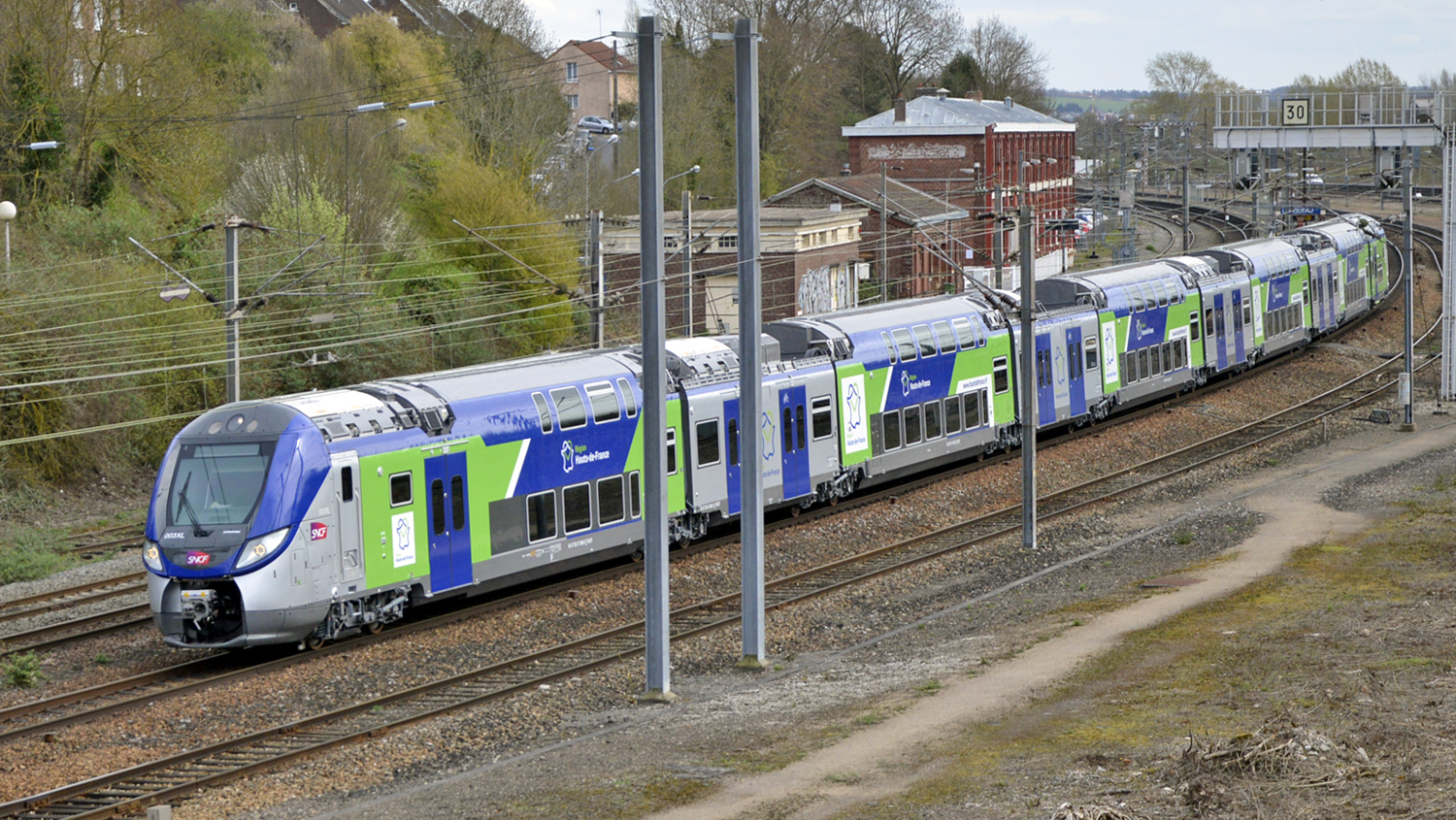
- Regio 2N in TER Hauts-de-France livery at Gare de Longueau.

- Regio 2N interior in high-capacity commuter service configuration (3+2 seating)
- In service: 2013–present
- Manufacturer: Alstom (originally Bombardier)
- Built at: Crespin
- Family name: OMNEO
- Replaced: BB 7200; BB 7600; BB 8500; BB 15000; BB 26000; BB 27300; Corail Coach; VO2N; VB2N; Z5300; Z5600; Z8800; Z20500; Z26500 (TER2NNG)
- Constructed: 2012–present
- Number under construction: 447 trainsets (3,528 cars)
- Number built: 281 trainsets (as of April 2021)
- Formation: 6, 7, 8 or 10 cars per trainset
- Operators: SNCF (TER and Transilien); Transdev (Marseille-Nice line)
- Lines served: Auvergne-Rhône-Alpes, Bretagne, Centre-Val de Loire, Hauts-de-France, Nouvelle-Aquitaine, Normandie, Occitanie, Pays de la Loire, Provence-Alpes-Côte d'Azur

Specifications
- Car body construction: Stainless steel
- Train length: 80.9–135.4 m (265 ft 5 in – 444 ft 3 in) (depending on configuration)
- Width: 2.99 m (9 ft 10 in) (double-deck cars); 3.05 m (10 ft 0 in) (single-deck cars)
- Height: 4.32 m (14 ft 2 in)
- Floor height: 34 cm (13 in) (double-deck cars, lower deck); 2.264 m (7 ft 5.1 in) (double-deck cars, upper deck); 60 cm (2 ft 0 in) (single-deck cars)
- Doors: 2 pairs per side (single-deck intermediate cars); 1 pair per side (end cars)
- Maximum speed: 160 km/h (99 mph) (standard); 200 km/h (120 mph) (V200)
- Traction system: MITRAC IGBT–VVVF
- Traction motors: 6–8 × 400 kW (536 hp) permanent-magnet synchronous motor (Bombardier)
- Power output: 2,400–3,200 kW (3,218–4,291 hp)
- Acceleration: 0.78 m/s^{2} (2.6 ft/s^{2})
- Deceleration: 1 m/s^{2} (3.3 ft/s^{2})
- Electric systems: Overhead line: 25 kV 50 Hz AC; 1,500 V DC
- Current collection: Pantograph (Type AX)
- Bogies: FLEXX Compact
- Braking systems: Disc, dynamic and regenerative
- Safety systems: Crocodile, KVB
- Coupling system: Scharfenberg-type, made by Dellner
- Multiple working: 3x Regio 2N family
- Track gauge: 1,435 mm (4 ft 8 1/2 in) standard gauge

The Regio 2N is family of a double-deck, dual-voltage electric multiple unit trainsets built for French rail operator SNCF to serve its regional rail routes (TER, Transilien, and RER).

The trains utilize a unique and highly configurable design. One of the end cars is single-deck and designed to accommodate wheelchair users, the other end car is double-deck. The intermediate cars are either double-deck with no doors accommodating seated passengers traveling long distances or single-deck with two double doors per side accommodating standing passengers traveling short distances. Trains can be configured with six, seven, eight or ten cars. Additionally, the seating can be configured for intercity service (2+1 seating in 1st class, 2+2 seating in 2nd class), regional service (2+2 seating throughout), or high-capacity commuter service (3+2 seating throughout).

The train was designed and originally built by Bombardier, but during delivery the company was bought by Alstom, which completed the order. A total of 447 trainsets have either been built or are under construction at the Alstom Crespin factory since 2012. The first set was placed into regular passenger service in September 2013.

The name Regio 2N is a sensational spelling of the word "region" (in reference to the regional rail routes these trains serve) including SNCF's designation for double-deck rolling stock: 2N (French: 2 Niveaux, English: two-level). Bombardier brands this equipment as the OMNEO and SNCF classes it as Z 55500, Z 56000, Z 56300, Z 56500, Z 56600, Z 56700, Z 56800, Z 57000, Z 57400 or Z 59000 depending on the configuration.

== History ==
The Omneo had been designed by Bombardier's facility at Crespin in response to a request issued by SNCF, which had sought to equip itself with a new generation of regional EMUs. Between 2002 and 2009, SNCF had experienced a 40% increase in passengers on its TER regional services, averaging around 800 000 passengers per day, and further growth in demand had been forecast over the following decades; the procurement of new trainsets was financed primarily by various regional authorities rather than SNCF itself. Following the receipt of several bids, during November 2009, an SNCF spokesperson stated that Bombardier was the preferred bidder at that stage. On 24 February 2010, Bombardier announced that it had been awarded a firm order for 80 trainsets. The contract, which included additional options for up to 860 total trainsets worth a total of €8 billion, called for deliveries of the initial batch to occur between June 2013 and December 2015.

In February 2012, static testing of an early trainset commenced; by September of that year, testing had proceeded to the trial running phase, which was conducted at the Velim railway test circuit. Between September 2012 and September 2013, the test fleet of nine pre-series trainsets accumulated 100,000km of single-unit operations and 20,000km of multiple-unit operations. In September 2013, a ceremony was held at the Crespin manufacturing plant, where Bombardier build the Omneo, at which the first trainset was delivered to SNCF; it was attended by company president Guillaume Pepy and various representatives of the regions that had funded the order—by that time expanded to 129 trainsets—ahead of delivery and testing across SNCF's own network. At the time, Bombardier stated that the test programme was 90% completed, the remainder largely focusing upon electromagnetic compatibility, air conditioning, and general multiple-unit operations; production was also ramping up from one trainset per month to three per month by January 2014.

In January 2014, SNCF exercised its option to procure a further 30 trainsets; these were followed by eight more Omneos during October 2015. In February 2016, four additional trainsets were opted for, resulting in a total of 213 trainsets being on order at this point. In November 2016, SNCF ordered 40 trainsets in the Premium configuration, this batch being the first to be equipped as such, featuring improved onboard amenities and a higher top speed; by August 2018, dynamic testing of the first Omneo Premium trainset was underway. By February 2018, a total of 382 trainsets had been ordered. In November 2018, 19 Premium trainsets were ordered for service from Paris to Hauts-de-France points. The Omneo is set to replace various older trainsets, including the Z2N, V2N, Vo-VR2N, RRR-Rio and Corail trains for both regional and intercity services across the French Regions.

== Design ==
The Bombardier Omneo is a double-deck electric multiple units (EMU). It features a modular design approach, allowing the trainset to be readily adapted for suburban, regional and intercity traffic. According to Bombardier, it is the world's first double-deck EMU to be articulated. Each trainset comprises both single level and double level cars; propulsion equipment, such as the braking resistors and electrical transformers, are installed on the roofs of the single level cars; the double level cars are dedicated to passenger seating alone. The Omneo typically comprises between six and ten individual cars in each trainset, giving a total length of between 81 metres (265 ft 8 31/32 in) and 135 metres (442 ft 10 31/32 in) and a width of 2.99 metres (9 ft 9 23/32 in) and 3.05 metres (10 ft 3/32 in) for twin and single level cars respectively. Dependent upon both length and seating configuration, a trainset can have a maximum passenger capacity of up to 1,380 people, being able to seat 780 of these. Individual cars of a trainset can be exchanged to change the ratio of double-deck to single-deck cars as to better suit a particular service.

The interior configuration is reconfigurable, allowing it to be adapted to suit the trainset's intended use and customer specifications. It has been anticipated that a common intercity configuration would feature a 2+1 seating configuration, dedicated luggage spaces, increased toilet capacity, greater seat pitch, individual reading lights and electric sockets, and footrests for greater comfort. The double level cars lack doors, as well as several common conveniences such as toilets and spaces for bicycles and wheelchairs, these can only be found within the single level cars. For passenger safety, an onboard CCTV system is also installed through the cars. The gangways between cars are also double level as to maximise passenger's accessibility and movement; the cars are wider than those of most conventional trains. The Premium variant of the Omneo features various improvements in passenger amenities over the Base model, these include spacious reclining seats with individual armrests, wider doors and a more luxurious interior.

Omneo trainsets can be specified with a 160 kilometres per hour (99 mph) or a 200 kilometres per hour (120 mph) top speed, these being available as the Base and Premium configurations respectively. SNCF classifies the base version as Z 55500 and the Premium as Z 56500. Omneo trainsets have a base power output of 2.4 megawatts (3,200 hp) with three powered bogies; the customer can specify a fourth powered bogie for an output of 3.2 megawatts (4,300 hp). The trainsets are powered by 1,500 V DC or 25 kV 50 Hz AC catenary. The trainsets are composed of relatively lightweight materials, which minimises axle loads; the Omneo is claimed by Bombardier to be 95% recyclable. It was designed to minimise both noise and vibration levels. The Omneo incorporates Bombardier's ECO4 technologies, comprising the four cornerstones of energy, efficiency, economy and ecology; examples include a permanent-magnet synchronous motor (PMSM), a thermo-efficient climate control system, aero-efficient exterior shaping, and an energy management control system, which reportedly reduce both energy consumption and CO2 emissions. Due to its high level of French-sourced content, the Omneo has received a Guaranteed French Origin label, the first to be granted within the rail industry.

== Distribution of Orders ==
Distribution of orders and deliveries
Regions (before merger)	Regions (after merger)	Ordered	Series	Length	Number of Cars
Aquitaine	Nouvelle-Aquitaine	40	Z 56300	Short (S)	6
Bretagne		7	Z 55500	Short (S)	6
Bretagne		14	Z 55500	Long (L)	8
Centre-Val de Loire		14	Z 55500	Long (L)	8
Centre-Val de Loire		2	Z 56500	Long (L)	8
Centre-Val de Loire		32	Z 56700	Long (L)	8
Midi-Pyrénées	Occitanie	18	Z 56300	Short (S)	6
Nord-Pas-de-Calais	Hauts-de-France	18	Z 55500	Medium (M)	7
Pays de la Loire		11	Z 56500	Long (L)	8
Picardie	Hauts-de-France	7	Z 55500	Extra-Long (XL)	10
Hauts-de-France		19	m	Extra-Long (XL)	10
Provence-Alpes-Côte d'Azur		16	Z 55500	Long (L)	8
Rhône-Alpes	Auvergne-Rhône-Alpes	40	Z 55500	Short (S)	6
Rhône-Alpes	Auvergne-Rhône-Alpes	19	Z 55500	Long (L)	8
Intercités Normandie	Normandie	40	Z 56600	Extra-Long (XL)	10
Intercités Normandie	Normandie	27	-	Extra-Long (XL)	10
Ile-de-France		73	Z 57000	Long (L)	8
Ile-de-France		42	Z 57000	Long (L)	8
Ile-de-France		19	Z 57000	Long (L)	8
	Total	447			

== Operators and routes ==
=== TER Auvergne-Rhône-Alpes ===
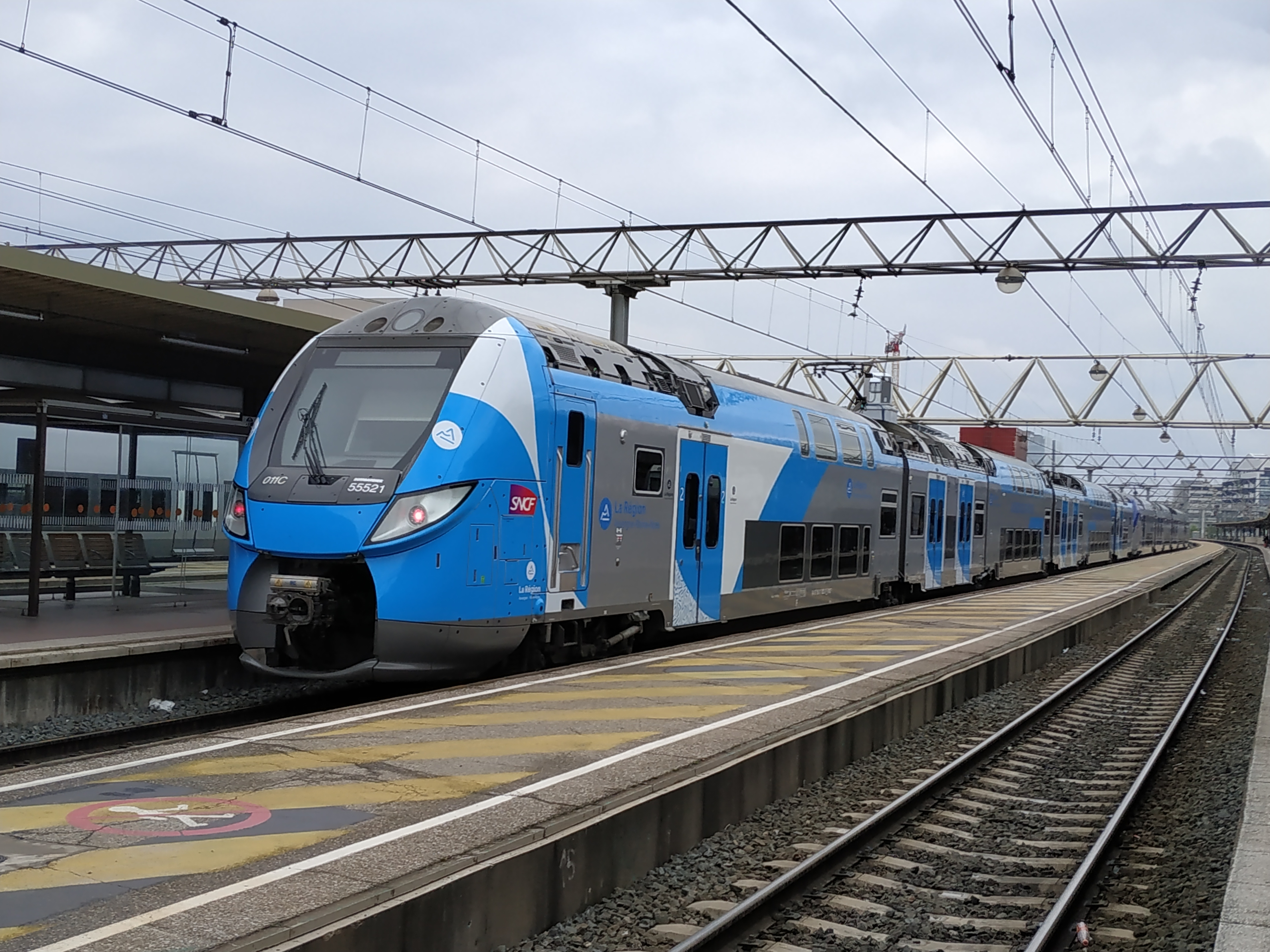
Regio 2N in TER Auvergne-Rhône-Alpes livery at Gare de Lyon-Part-Dieu.

- Mâcon-Ville – Villefranche-sur-Saône – Lyon-Perrache – Vienne – Valence-Ville
- Saint-Étienne-Châteaucreux – Lyon-Part-Dieu – Ambérieu-en-Bugey
- Firminy – Saint-Étienne-Châteaucreux – Givors-Ville – Lyon-Perrache
- Lyon-Perrache – Saint-André-le-Gaz

=== TER Bretagne ===
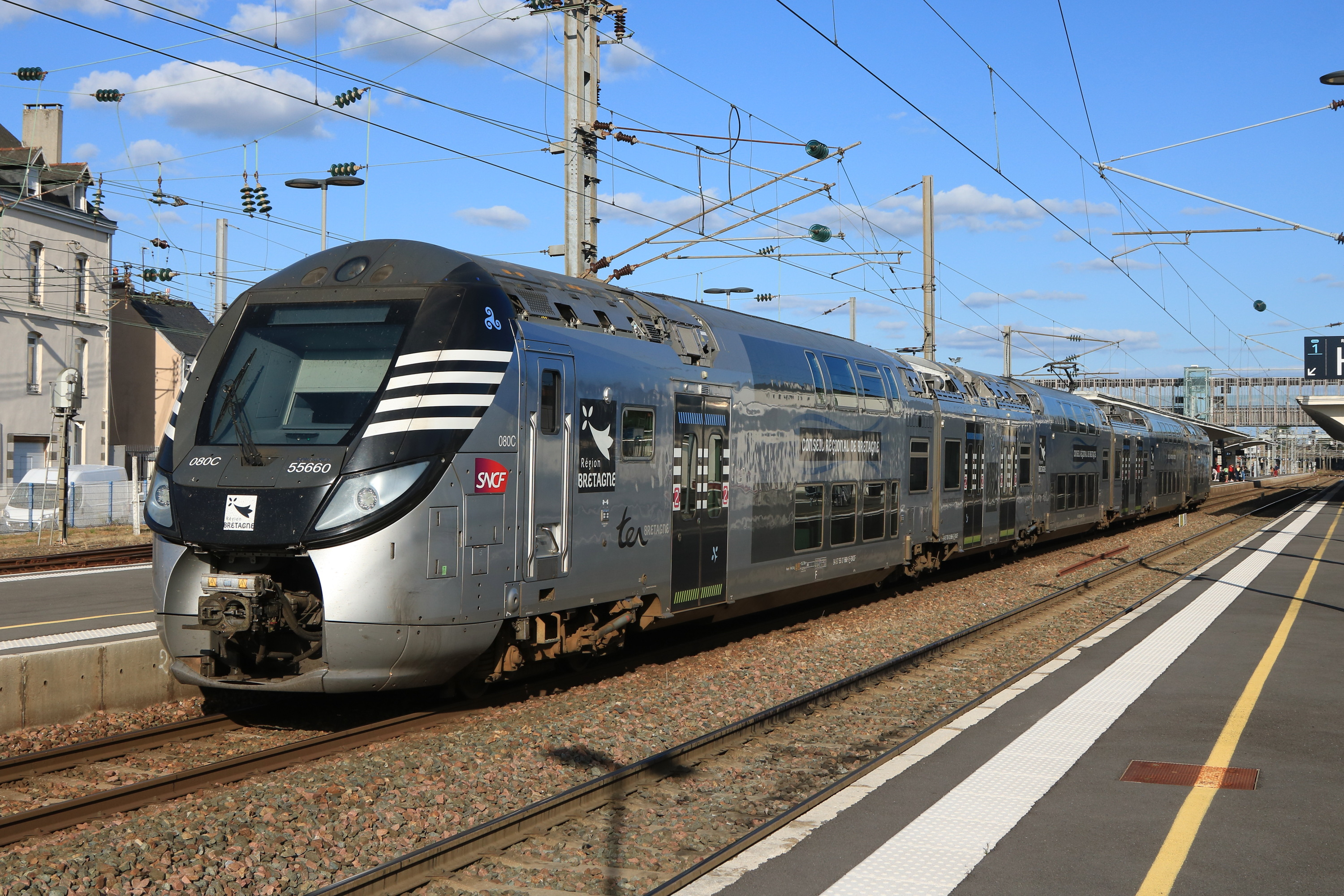
Regio 2N in TER Bretagne livery on a train from Rennes to Laval.

- Rennes – Saint-Malo
- Rennes – Brest
- Rennes – Quimper
- Rennes – Redon
- Rennes – Vannes

=== TER Centre-Val de Loire ===
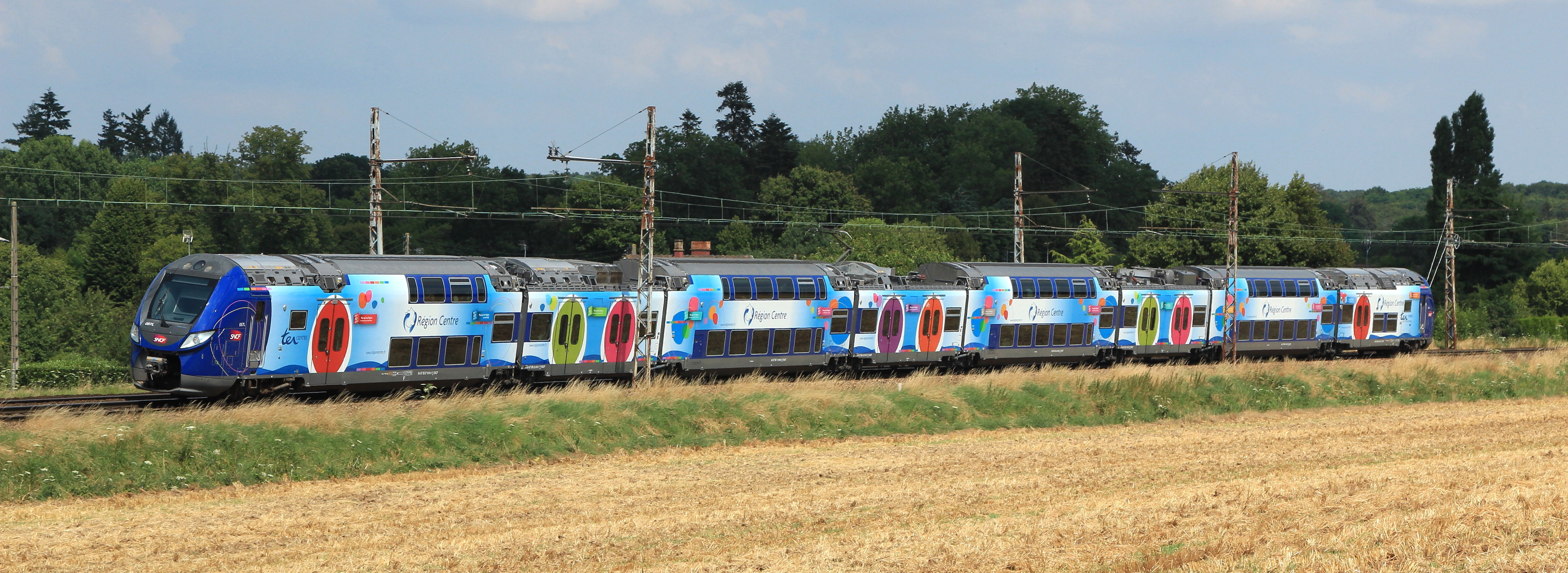
Regio 2N in TER Centre-Val de Loire livery on a train from Paris to Le Mans.

- Paris-Montparnasse – Le Mans
- Le Croisic – Nantes – Angers – Tours – Orléans
- Paris-Austerlitz – Tours – Orléans (planned Omneo Premium)
- Paris-Austerlitz – Bourges (planned Omneo Premium)
- Paris-Bercy – Nevers (planned Omneo Premium)

=== TER Hauts-de-France ===
- Paris-Nord – Creil – Compiègne
- Lille-Flandres – Valenciennes
- Lille-Flandres – Libercourt – Lens
- Lille-Flandres – Don - Sainghin – Béthune
- Lille-Flandres – Amiens
- Paris-Nord – Amiens (planned Omneo Premium)
- Paris-Nord – Saint-Quentin – Cambrai or Maubeuge (planned Omneo Premium)

=== TER Nouvelle-Aquitaine ===
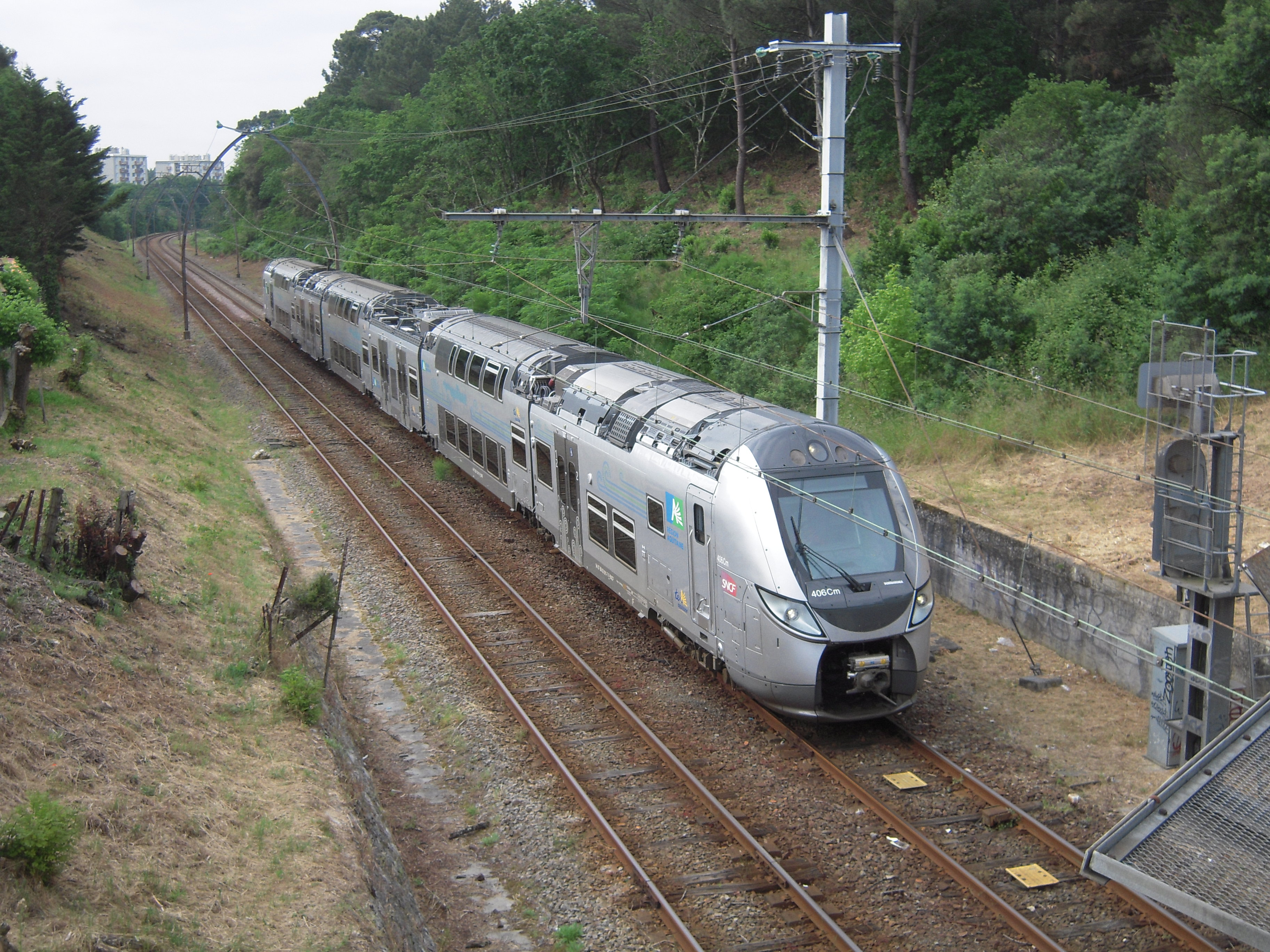
Regio 2N in TER Nouvelle-Aquitaine livery on a train from Bordeaux to Arcachon.

- Bordeaux-Saint-Jean – Arcachon
- Bordeaux-Saint-Jean – Agen
- Bordeaux-Saint-Jean – Libourne – Angoulême

=== TER Normandie ===
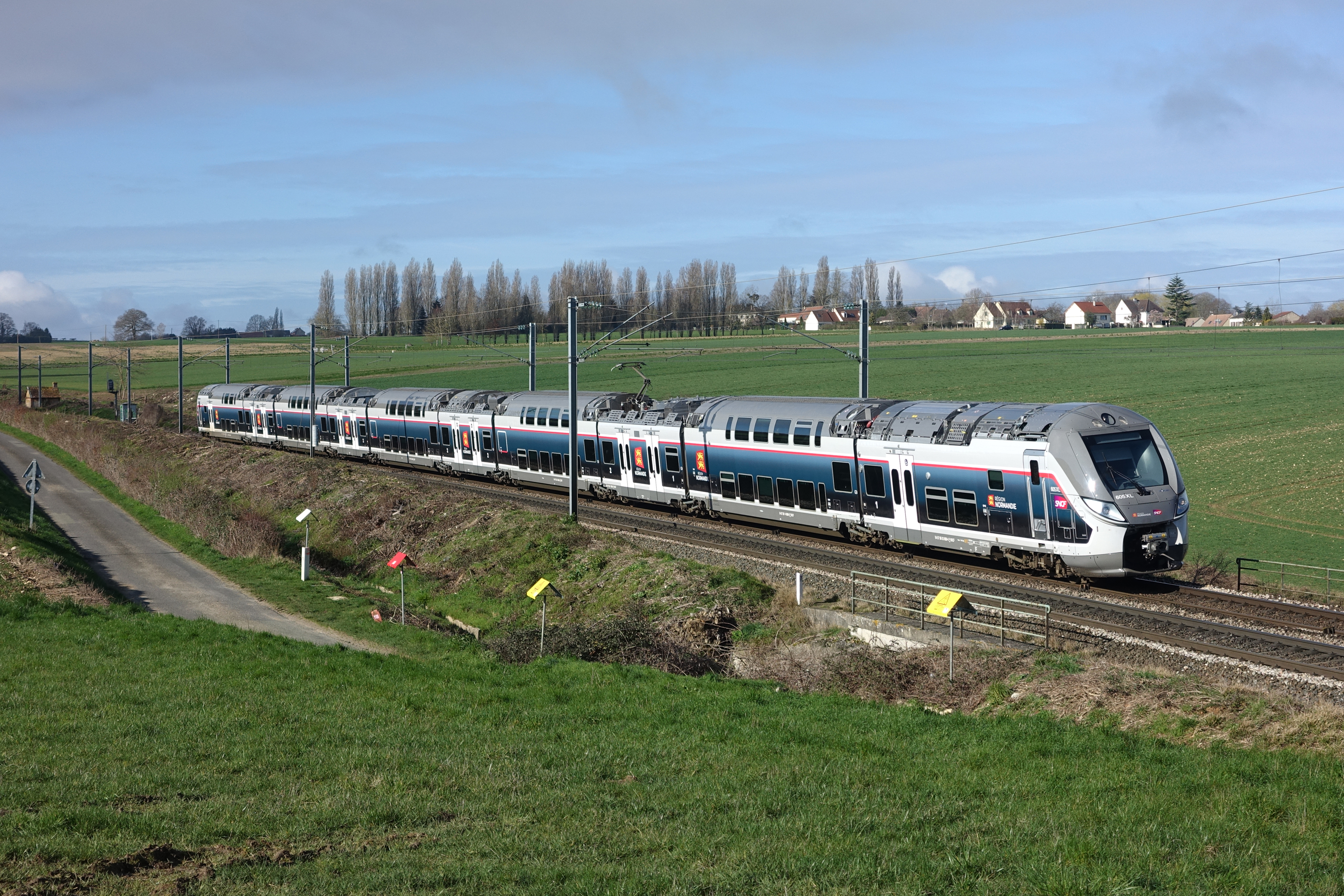
Regio 2N in TER Normandie livery at Ménerville.

- Paris-Saint-Lazare – Rouen – Le Havre
- Paris-Saint-Lazare – Caen – Cherbourg
- Paris-Saint-Lazare – Trouville-Deauville
- Paris-Saint-Lazare – Rouen-Rive-Droite
- Paris-Saint-Lazare – Serquigny

=== TER Occitanie ===
- Toulouse-Matabiau – Agen
- Toulouse-Matabiau – Montauban-Ville-Bourbon
- Toulouse-Matabiau – Narbonne
- Toulouse-Matabiau – Tarbes
- Toulouse-Matabiau – Pau
- Toulouse-Matabiau – Ax-les-Thermes

=== TER Pays de la Loire ===
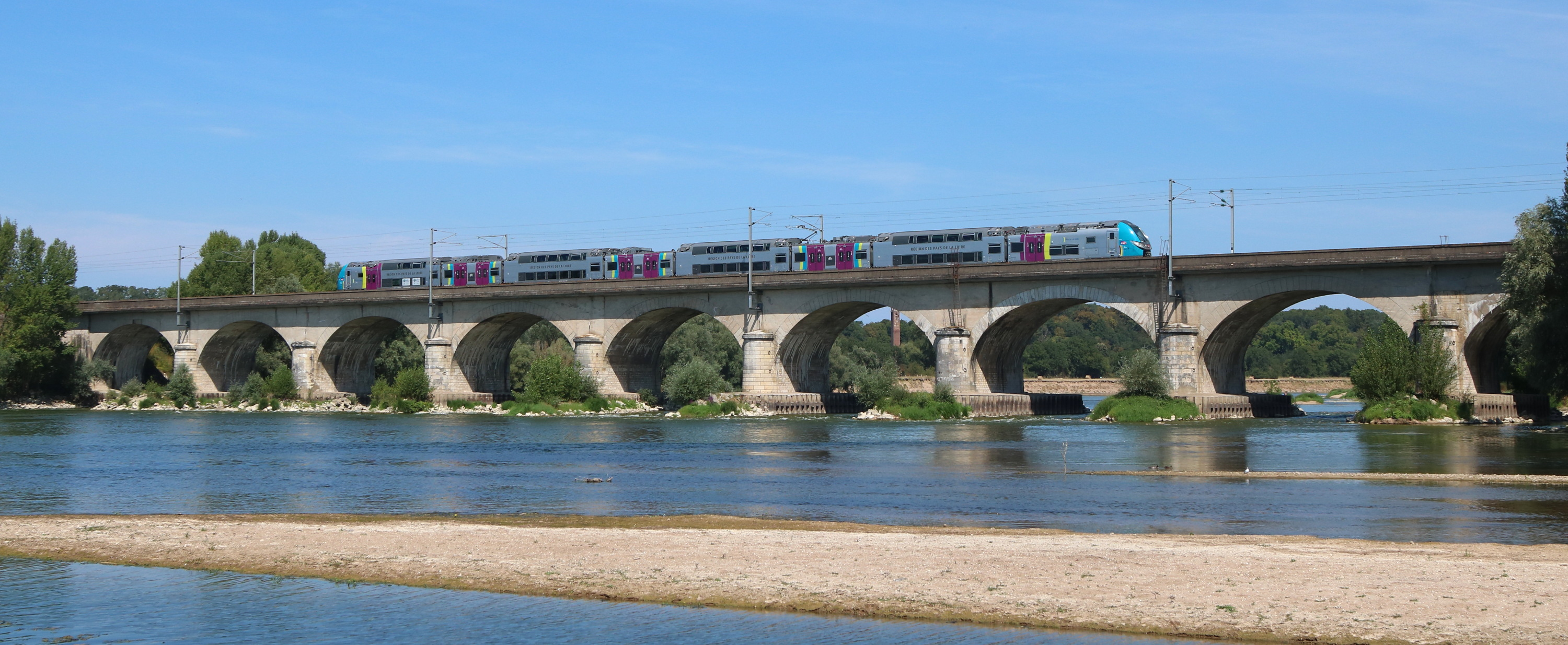
Regio 2N in TER Pays de la Loire livery on a train from Nantes to Orléans, on the Cinq-Mars Viaduct.

Since June 9, 2018, the Regio2N trains have been carrying out Interloire relations between Le Croisic or Nantes and Orléans

=== TER Provence-Alpes-Côte d'Azur ===
- Marseille-Saint-Charles – Toulon – Hyères
- Marseille-Saint-Charles – Cannes – Nice-Ville – Monaco-Monte-Carlo – Menton – Vintimille

=== Transilien (Ile-de-France) ===
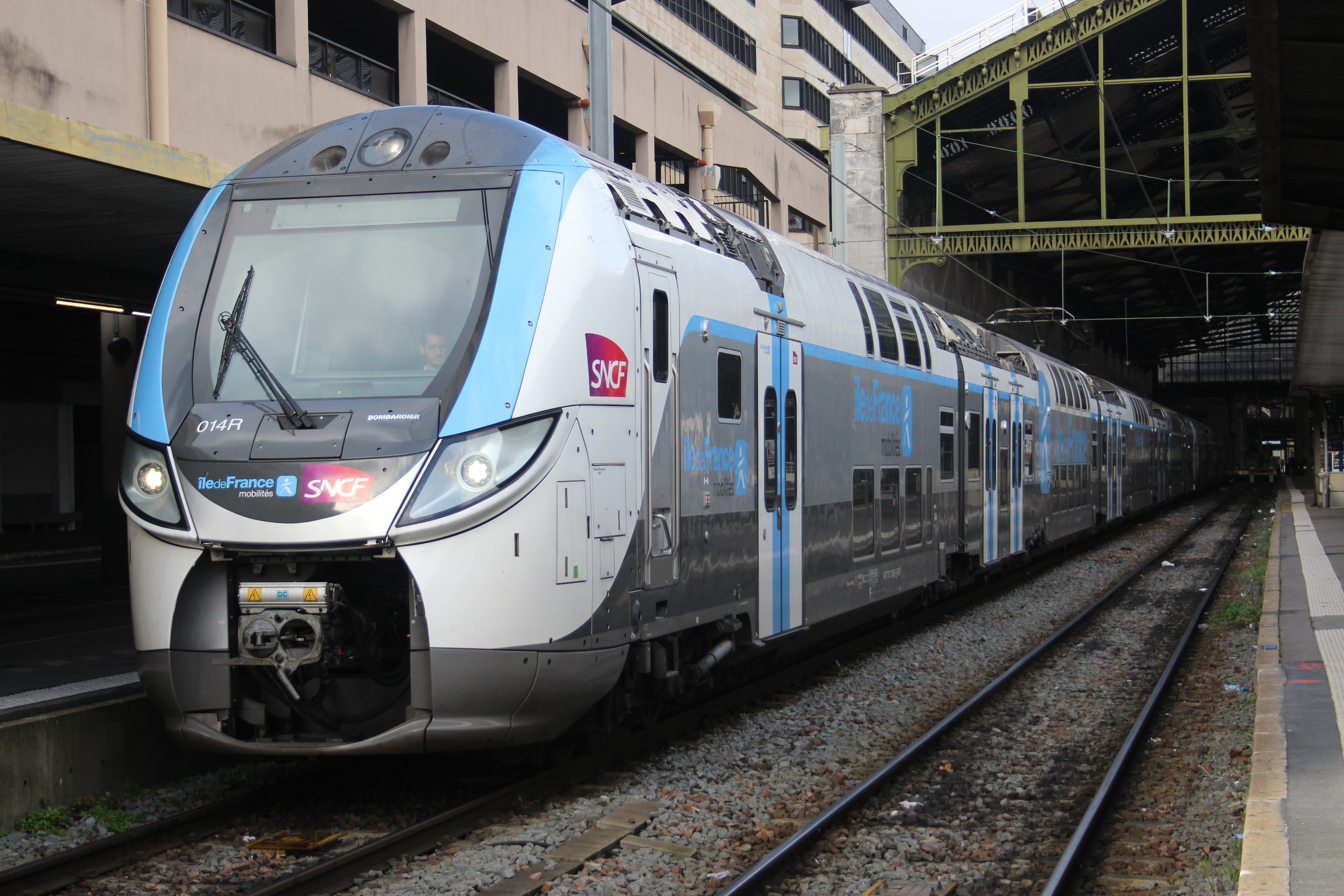
Regio 2N in Île de France livery at Gare de Lyon.

==== Transilien Line N ====
- Paris-Montparnasse – Rambouillet
- Paris-Montparnasse – Dreux
- Paris-Montparnasse – Mantes-la-Jolie

==== Transilien Line R ====
- Melun – Montereau via Héricy
- Paris-Gare-de-Lyon – Montereau via Moret
- Paris-Gare-de-Lyon – Montargis

==== RER D ====
- Melun – Creil via Yerres or Coudray-Montceaux
- Creil – Malesherbes
