= Futuroscope station =

Railway station in Poitiers, France

Futuroscope

General information
- Location: Chasseneuil-du-Poitou, Vienne, Nouvelle-Aquitaine; France
- Coordinates: 46°40′12″N 0°22′39″E
- Line: LGV Atlantique
- Platforms: 2
- Tracks: 4

Other information
- Station code: 87324095

History
- Opened: 28 May 2000

Services
| Preceding station | SNCF | Following station |
|---|---|---|
| Châtellerault towards Montparnasse | TGV | Poitiers Terminus |
| Preceding station | TER Nouvelle-Aquitaine | Following station |
| Jaunay-Clan towards Tours | 11 | Chasseneuil towards Poitiers |
Location

Futuroscope is a TGV railway station located near Poitiers, France, on the Paris–Bordeaux railway. It provides direct access to the theme park Futuroscope.

== History ==
Service commenced on 28 May 2000 with the arrival of the first TGV at 9:27 AM, and the station was officially inaugurated on 13 June. The station is owned and was financed largely by the Vienne departmental council, at a cost of €9.3 million. The station building consists of a large glass structure in the shape of an isoceles right triangle with leg lengths of approximately 70 meters. A 330 meter footbridge, located opposite the platforms on the station's west corner, allows for direct pedestrian access to the theme park.

Situated on the Paris–Bordeaux conventional main line, the station is served by high-speed TGV trains, with regional TER Nouvelle-Aquitaine services introduced on 14 December 2014, and low-cost, low-speed Ouigo Train Classique services on 4 April 2026.

Passenger numbers were significantly lower than was expected prior to opening, eventually contributing to the closure of several businesses established in the stations's proximity; in addition, services to the station were reduced following the opening of the LGV Sud Europe Atlantique on 2 July 2017, which diverted a majority of TGV trains off the section of low-speed line between Saint-Pierre-des-Corps and Poitiers.
