= Interloire =

French train service

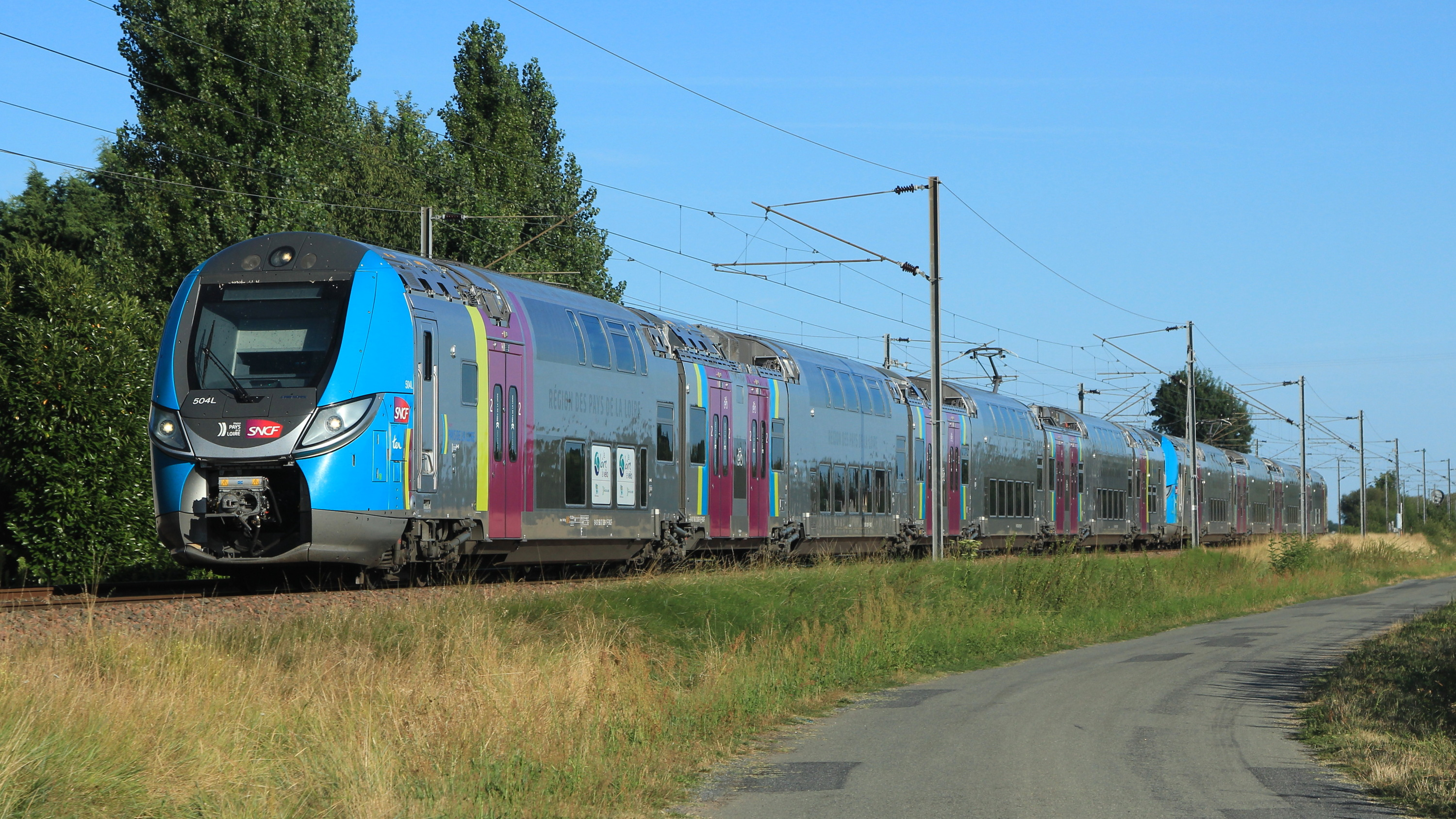

Overview
- System: TER Centre-Val de Loire; TER Pays de la Loire
- First service: 25 September 1994
- Current operator: SNCF

Route
- Termini: Orléans station Nantes station/Le Croisic station
- Stops: 21

Technical
- Rolling stock: Z56500

Interloire (or TER 200 Interloire) is a French train service run by TER Centre-Val de Loire and TER Pays de la Loire linking Orléans to Le Croisic via Blois, Saint-Pierre-des-Corps, Saumur, Angers and Nantes.

The sections between Nantes-Angers and Tours-Orléans are respectively part of the major railway axes Paris-Nantes and Paris-Bordeaux (on the classic lines). The electrification, the bigger curve radii and the absence of level crossings make this one of the rare lines with an authorised speed of 200 km/h.

During weekdays, there are on average 3 return journeys per day Orléans-Nantes, of which one is extended to Le Croisic. On weekends, the service is more frequent.

== Route ==
Stations in bold are served by every train as they pass through the respective station.

	Station	Département	City	Connections
o	**Orléans**	45	Orléans	Intercités, TER Centre-Val de Loire, Orléans tramway
o	Beaugency	45	Beaugency	TER Centre-Val de Loire
o	**Blois**	41	Blois	Intercités, TER Centre-Val de Loire
o	Amboise	37	Amboise	TER Centre-Val de Loire
o	**Saint-Pierre-des-Corps**	37	Tours	TGV, Intercités, TER Centre-Val de Loire
o	**Tours**	37	Tours	TGV, Intercités, TER Centre-Val de Loire, Tramway de Tours
o	**Saumur Rive Droite**	49	Saumur	TGV, Intercités, TER Pays de la Loire, TER Centre-Val de Loire, TER Nouvelle-Aquitaine
o	**Angers-Saint-Laud**	49	Angers	TGV, OUIGO, Intercités, TER Pays de la Loire, Tramway d'Angers
o	**Ancenis**	44	Ancenis	TER Pays de la Loire
o	**Nantes**	44	Nantes	TGV, OUIGO, Intercités, TER Pays de la Loire, Tramway de Nantes
o	**Savenay**	44	Savenay	TER Pays de la Loire
o	**Saint-Nazaire**	44	Saint-Nazaire	TGV, Intercités, TER Pays de la Loire
o	**Pornichet**	44	Pornichet	TER Pays de la Loire
o	**La Baule-les-Pins**	44	La Baule-les-Pins	TER Pays de la Loire
o	**La Baule-Escoublac**	44	La Baule-Escoublac	TGV, Intercités, TER Pays de la Loire
o	**Le Pouliguen**	44	Le Pouliguen	TER Pays de la Loire
o	**Batz-sur-Mer**	44	Batz-sur-Mer	TER Pays de la Loire
o	**Le Croisic**	44	Le Croisic	TGV, Intercités, TER Pays de la Loire
