= Châtellerault station =

Railway station in Châtellerault, France

Châtellerault
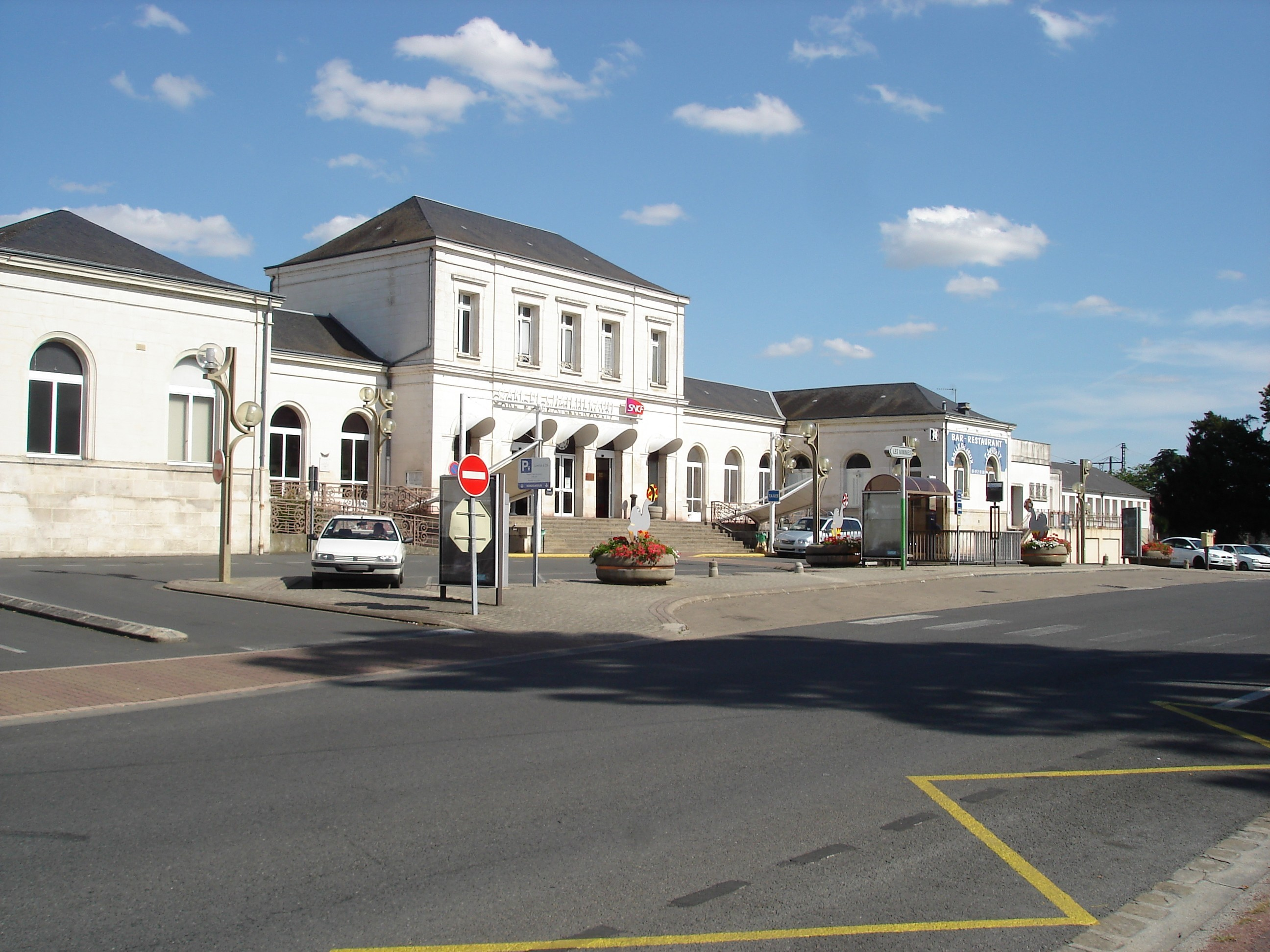

General information
- Location: 2, boulevard Sadi-Carnot; 86100 Châtellerault; France
- Coordinates: 46.82°N 0.549°E
- Elevation: 60 m (200 ft)
- Owner: SNCF
- Operator: SNCF
- Line: Paris–Bordeaux
- Platforms: 2
- Tracks: 3 (plus service tracks)

Other information
- Station code: 87575142

History
- Opened: 15 July 1851

Services
Preceding station	SNCF	Following station
Saint-Pierre-des-Corps towards Montparnasse	TGV	Futuroscope towards Poitiers
Preceding station	TER Nouvelle-Aquitaine	Following station
Ingrandes-sur-Vienne towards Tours	11	Nerpuy towards Poitiers
Location

Châtellerault station (French: Gare de Châtellerault) is a station on the Paris–Bordeaux railway located in the commune of Châtellerault, Vienne, in the Nouvelle-Aquitaine region of France. Opened in 1851, the station is served by TGV high-speed trains as well as regional TER Nouvelle-Aquitaine services.

== History ==
In 1839, during the construction of the Paris-Bordeaux main line, the Châtterault council began debating plans, furnished by an engineer M. Correard, for the establishment of a railway station on either the west or east side of the town. On 4 August 1845, the council voted to locate the station on the east side, which allowed for connections to the road network, access to the Vienne river, and adequate space to build engineering workshops alongside the station. Construction commenced in 1850, carried out by the Compagnie du chemin de fer du Centre, a railway company affiliated with the larger Compagnie du chemin de fer de Paris à Orléans; the station was opened alongside the rest of the Tours-Poitiers segment of the line on 15 July 1851.

On 27 March 1852, ownership of the station was transferred from the Compagnie du chemin de fer du Centre to the Compagnie du chemin de fer de Paris à Orléans, when the former was absorbed by the latter. In 1938, the company was nationalised, and the station became part of the SNCF network.

The station was modernised in the course of construction of the southwest branch of the LGV Atlantique, which was completed on 30 September 1990. Further modernisations and accessibility upgrades, including the construction of a new 20-meter metallic footbridge, were completed on 10 July 2025.

== See also ==
- List of SNCF stations in Nouvelle-Aquitaine
