= Cercottes station =

Railway station in Cercottes, France

Coordinates: 47°59′09″N 1°53′05″E

Cercottes is a railway station in Cercottes, Centre-Val de Loire, France. The station was opened on 5 May 1843, and is located on the Paris–Bordeaux railway line. The station is served by TER (local) services operated by the SNCF.

== Train services ==
The station is served by regional trains (TER Centre-Val de Loire) to Orléans, Étampes and Paris. The station is served by about 6 trains per day in each direction.

Preceding station	Le Réseau Rémi	Following station
Les Aubrais towards Orléans	1.1	Chevilly towards Paris-Austerlitz

== Gallery ==
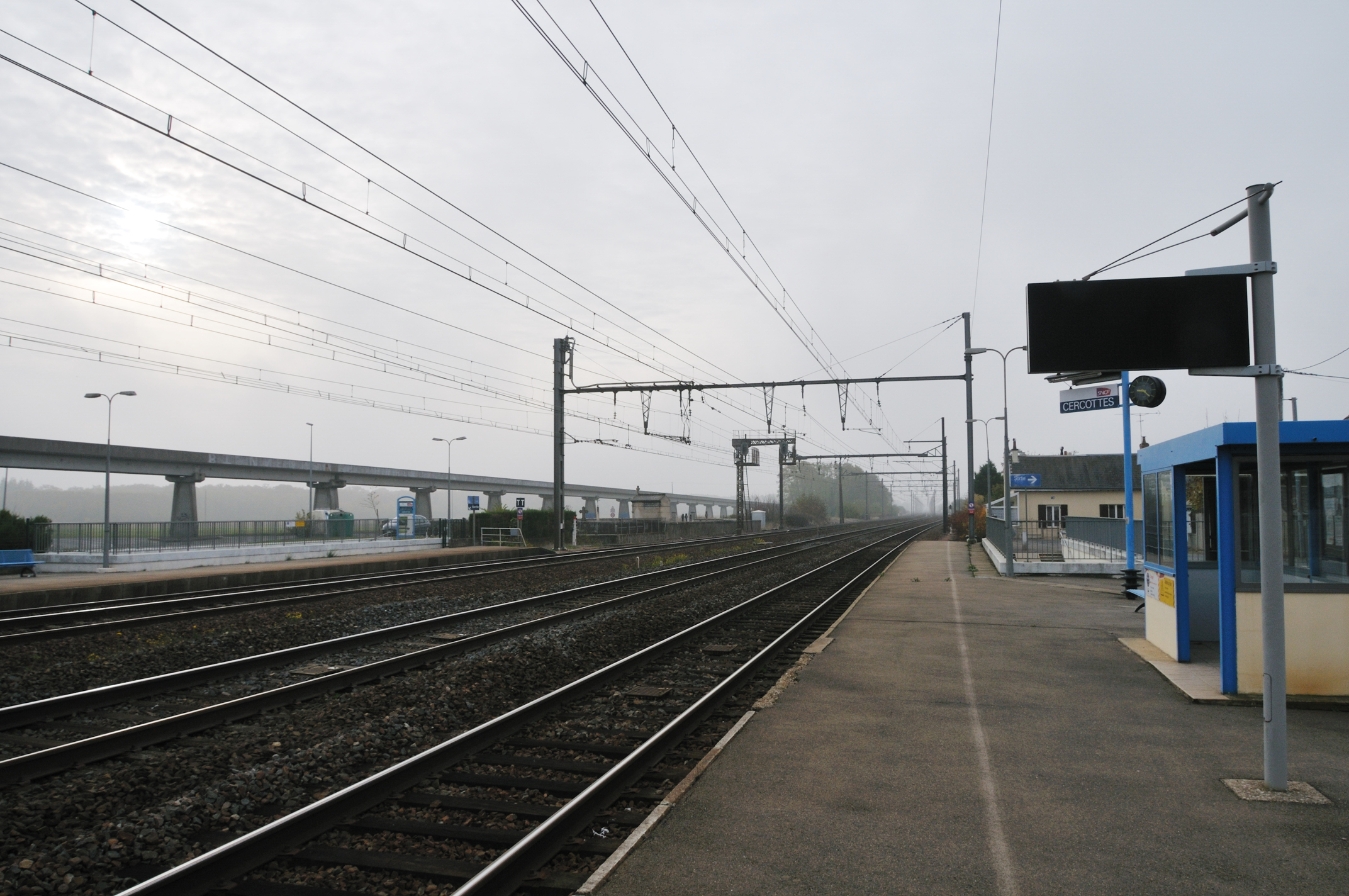
The station, in the background is the Aérotrain track

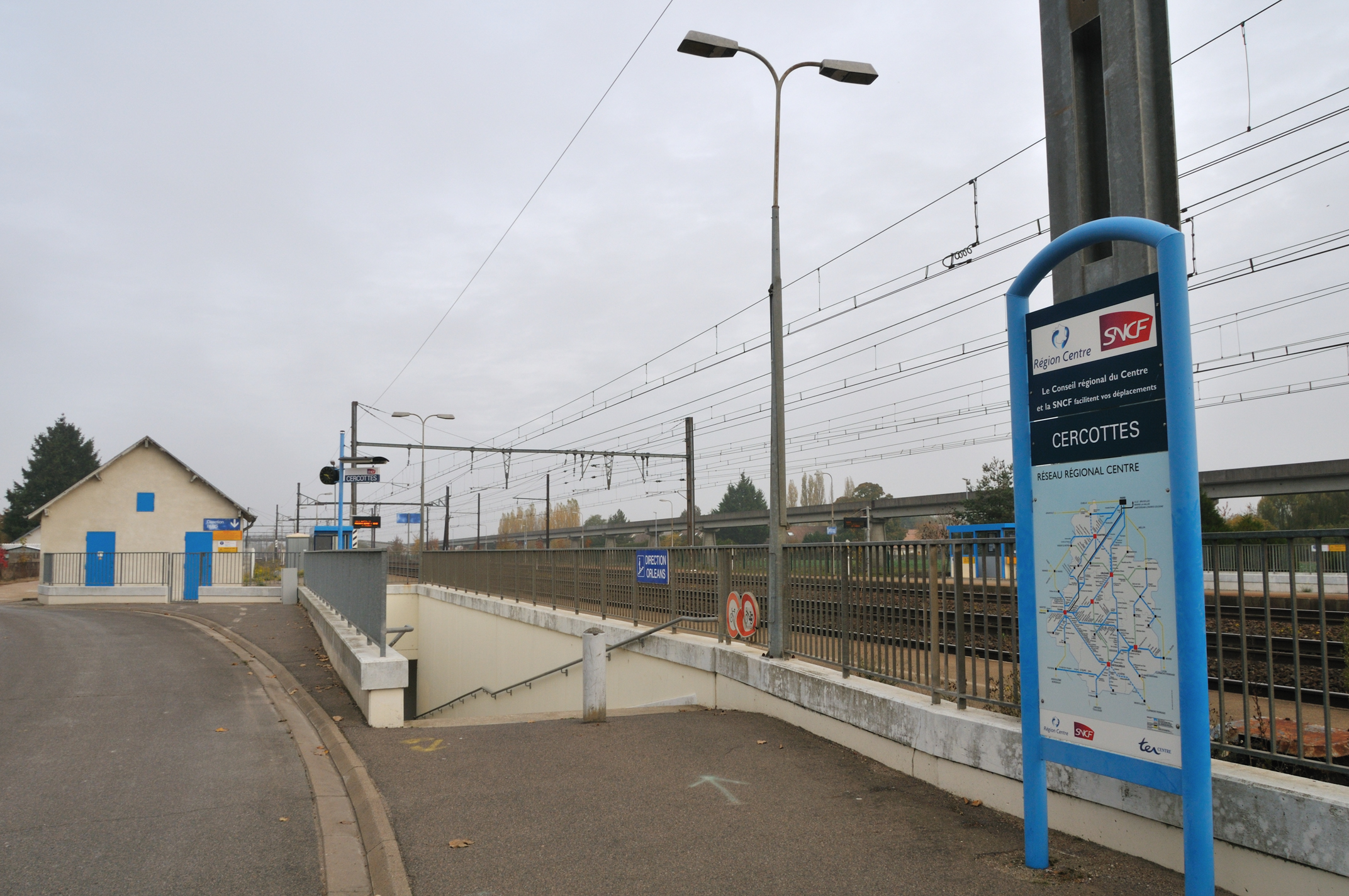
The station
