= Aqualys =

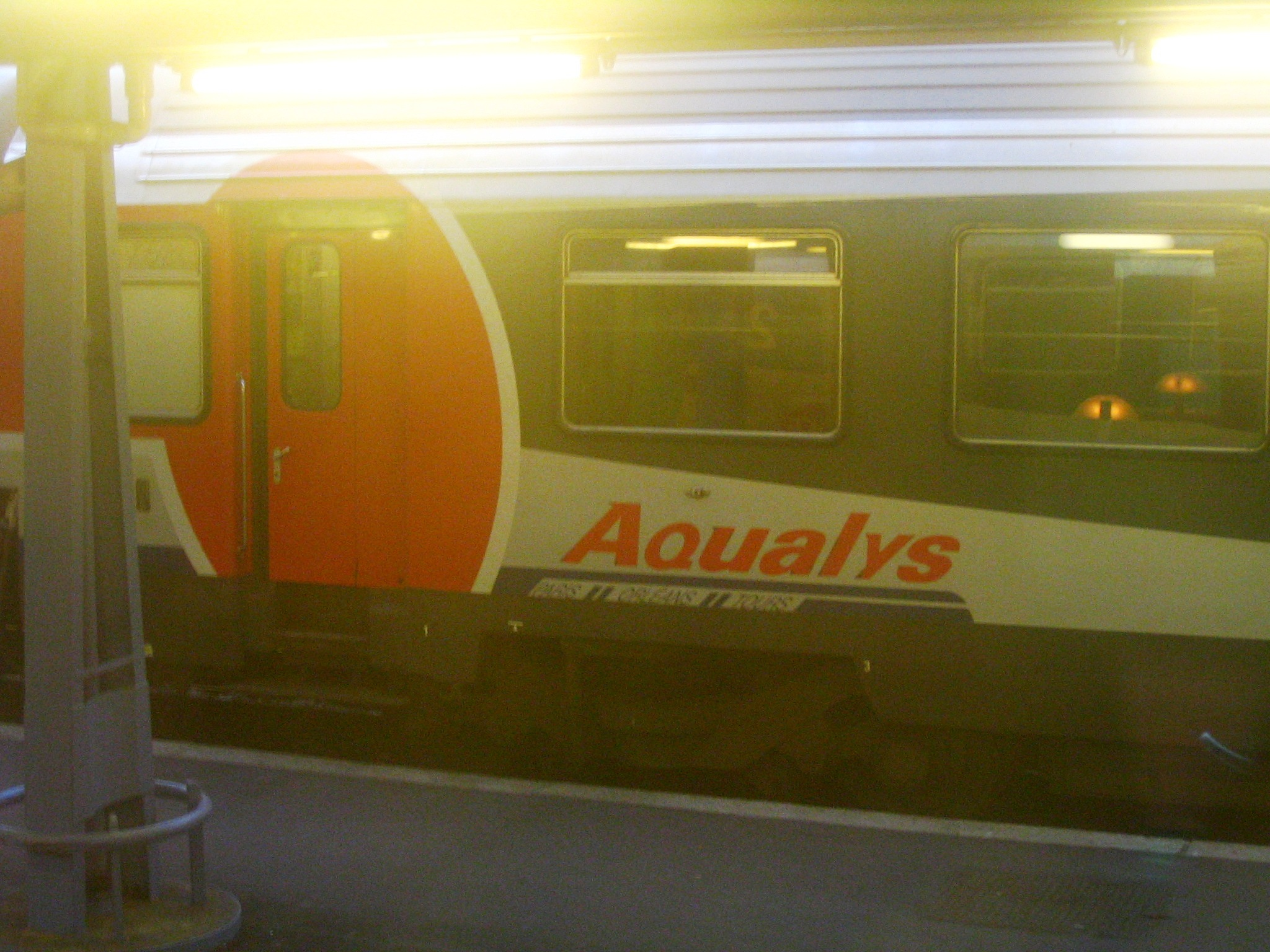
A Corail train in Aqualys livery, at the Gare d'Austerlitz, August 2006.

Aqualys was between 2000 and 2011 the name given to the Intercités route between Paris and Tours via Orléans on the classic lines.

== History ==
Even though this route had already existed for a long time, it was attributed this name after all its trains were renovated around the year 2000. This name is therefore the name of the train and not of the Railway which happens to be the historic line of the PO relaying Paris to Orléans and Bordeaux. The Aqualys therefore shares this line with the TER Centre trains Tours-Orléans and Orléans-Étampes-Paris, freight trains, the trains Paris-Royan, Paris-Madrid (the Talgo), Orléans-Nantes (the Interloire) and some rare Paris - Bordeaux using the classic line that can be found during the holidays.
