= Saint-Pierre-des-Corps station =

Railway station in Saint-Pierre-des-Corps, France

Saint-Pierre-des-Corps
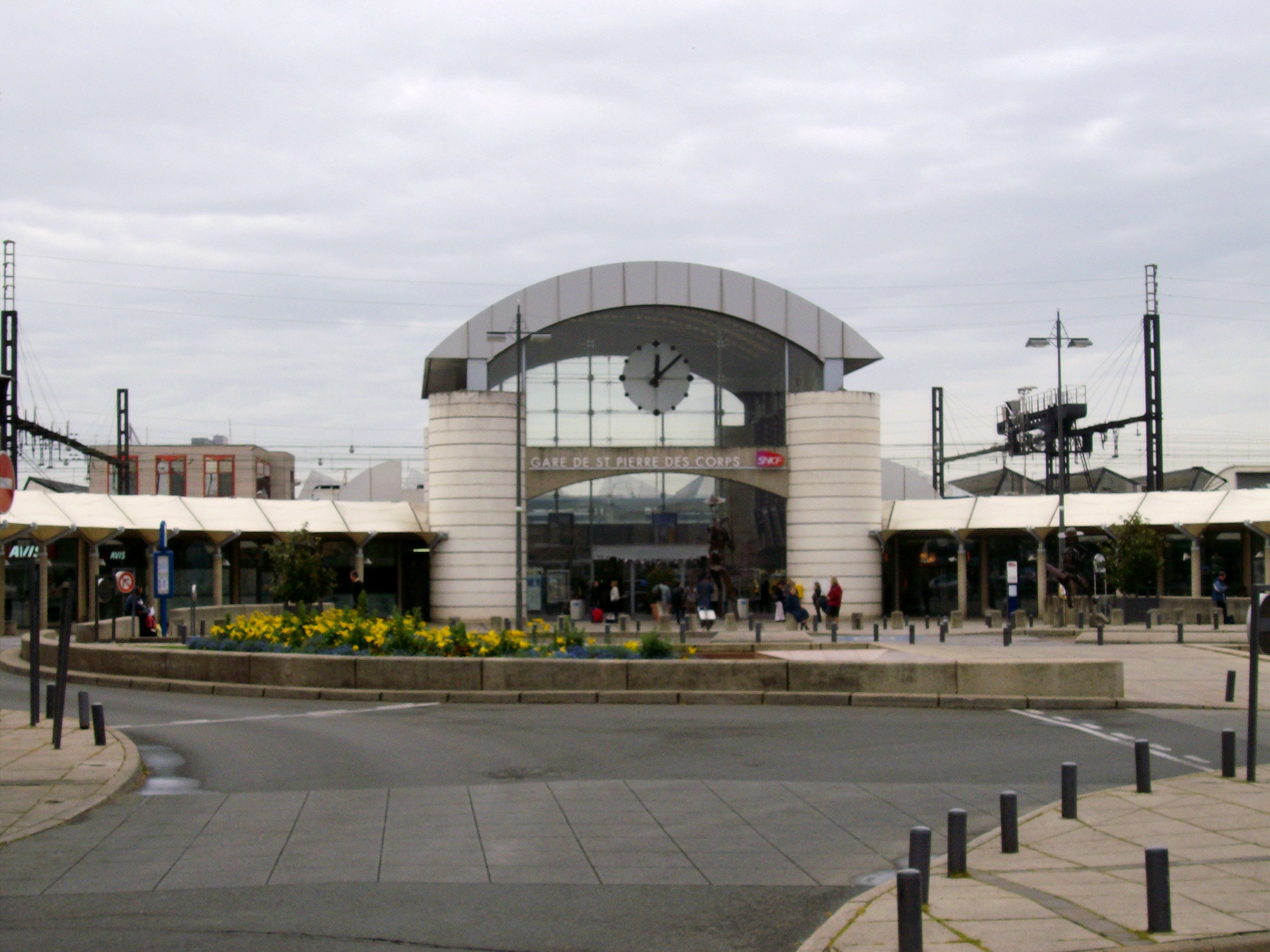

General information
- Location: Saint-Pierre-des-Corps, near Tours, Indre-et-Loire, Centre-Val de Loire; France
- Coordinates: 47°23′9″N 0°43′24″E
- Owner: SNCF
- Operator: SNCF
- Lines: TER, Intercités, TGV
- Platforms: 2
- Tracks: 3

Other information
- Station code: 87571240; IATA: XSH

Passengers
- 2024: 4,356,356
Services
Preceding station	SNCF	Following station
Vendôme-Villiers-sur-Loir TGV towards Montparnasse	TGV	Châtellerault towards Bordeaux
Vendôme-Villiers-sur-Loir TGV towards Montparnasse	TGV	Tours Terminus
Saumur towards Nantes	Intercités	Vierzon-Ville towards Lyon-Perrache
Preceding station	Le Réseau Rémi	Following station
Tours Terminus	2.1	Montlouis-sur-Loire towards Orléans
Tours Terminus	2.2	Véretz-Montlouis towards Vierzon
Tours towards Nantes	2.6	Blois towards Orléans
Preceding station	Ouigo	Following station
Massy TGV towards Tourcoing	Grande Vitesse	Poitiers towards Bordeaux
Montparnasse Terminus	Grande Vitesse	Poitiers towards Bordeaux
Blois towards Paris-Austerlitz	Train Classique	Saumur towards Nantes
Location

Saint-Pierre-des-Corps station (French: Gare de Saint-Pierre-des-Corps) is a railway station serving the town of Saint-Pierre-des-Corps and the Tours agglomeration, Indre-et-Loire department, western France. It is situated on the Paris–Bordeaux railway and the Tours–Saint-Nazaire railway.

== History ==
Given its strategic position on the Loire, the entire Tours / Saint-Pierre-des-Corps railway complex was the target of bombing during the Second World War. In 1990 the passenger building, which by then no longer existed, was rebuilt following the opening of the LGV Atlantique, to accommodate TGV and Aqualys from 2001. This latter service is still provided, but was re-marketed as the Intercités brand.

In 2024, SNCF estimated annual usage of this station is 4,356,356.

== Passenger services ==
=== Reception ===
The SNCF station has a passenger building, with ticket offices, open every day. It is equipped with automatic machines for the purchase of tickets.

=== Services ===
Saint-Pierre-des-Corps is served by TGV and Ouigo, Intercités, Interloire, Rémi Express, TER Auvergne-Rhône-Alpes, Aléop (formerly TER Pays de la Loire trains) and rail shuttles between Tours and Saint-Pierre-des-Corps. However, the waiting room is located on the central and main platform, which makes it necessary to leave the station and to enter it.

The following services currently call at Saint-Pierre-des-Corps:

- high speed services (TGV) Paris - Bordeaux
- intercity services (Intercités) Nantes - Saint-Pierre-des-Corps - Bourges - Lyon
- regional services (TER Centre-Val de Loire) Tours - Blois - Orléans
- regional services (TER Centre-Val de Loire) Tours - Gièvres - Vierzon
- regional services (TER Centre-Val de Loire) Nantes - Angers - Tours - Blois - Orléans

=== Other services ===
A park for bikes and parking for vehicles are provided.

== Freight traffic ==
Until 2007 the station also included a marshalling yard, on a large site that extended all the way to the neighbouring commune of La Ville-aux-Dames. This station is open to freight service.

== See also ==
- List of SNCF stations in Centre-Val de Loire
