= Tours–Le Mans railway =

Railway line in France

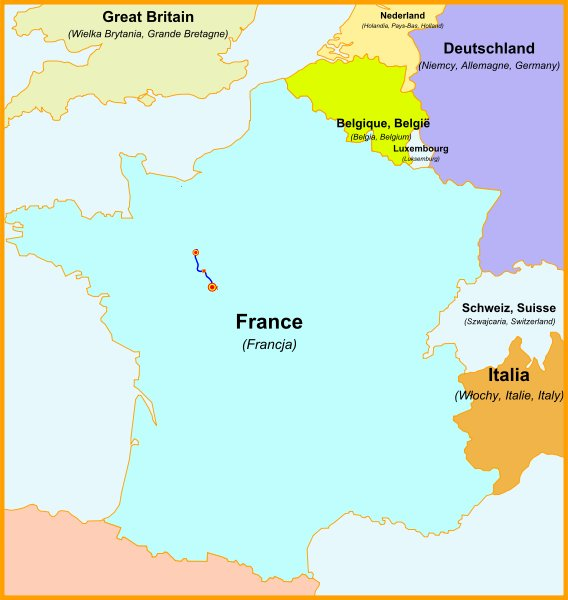
- Map of the line

Overview
- Status: Operational
- Owner: RFF
- Locale: France (Centre-Val de Loire, Pays de la Loire)
- Termini: Tours; Le Mans

Service
- System: SNCF
- Operator: SNCF

History
- Opened: 1858

Technical
- Line length: 96 km (60 mi)
- Num of tracks: Double track
- Track gauge: 1,435 mm (4 ft 8 1/2 in) standard gauge
- Electrification: non electrified

The railway from Tours to Le Mans is a French 96-kilometre long railway line. It is used for passenger (express, regional and suburban) and freight traffic. The railway was opened in 1858.

The line is non-electrified, only around Tours and Le Mans.

== Main stations ==
- Tours station
- Château-du-Loir station
- Le Mans station
