= Vierzon-Ville station =

Railway station in Vierzon, France

Coordinates: 47°13′37″N 2°3′36″E

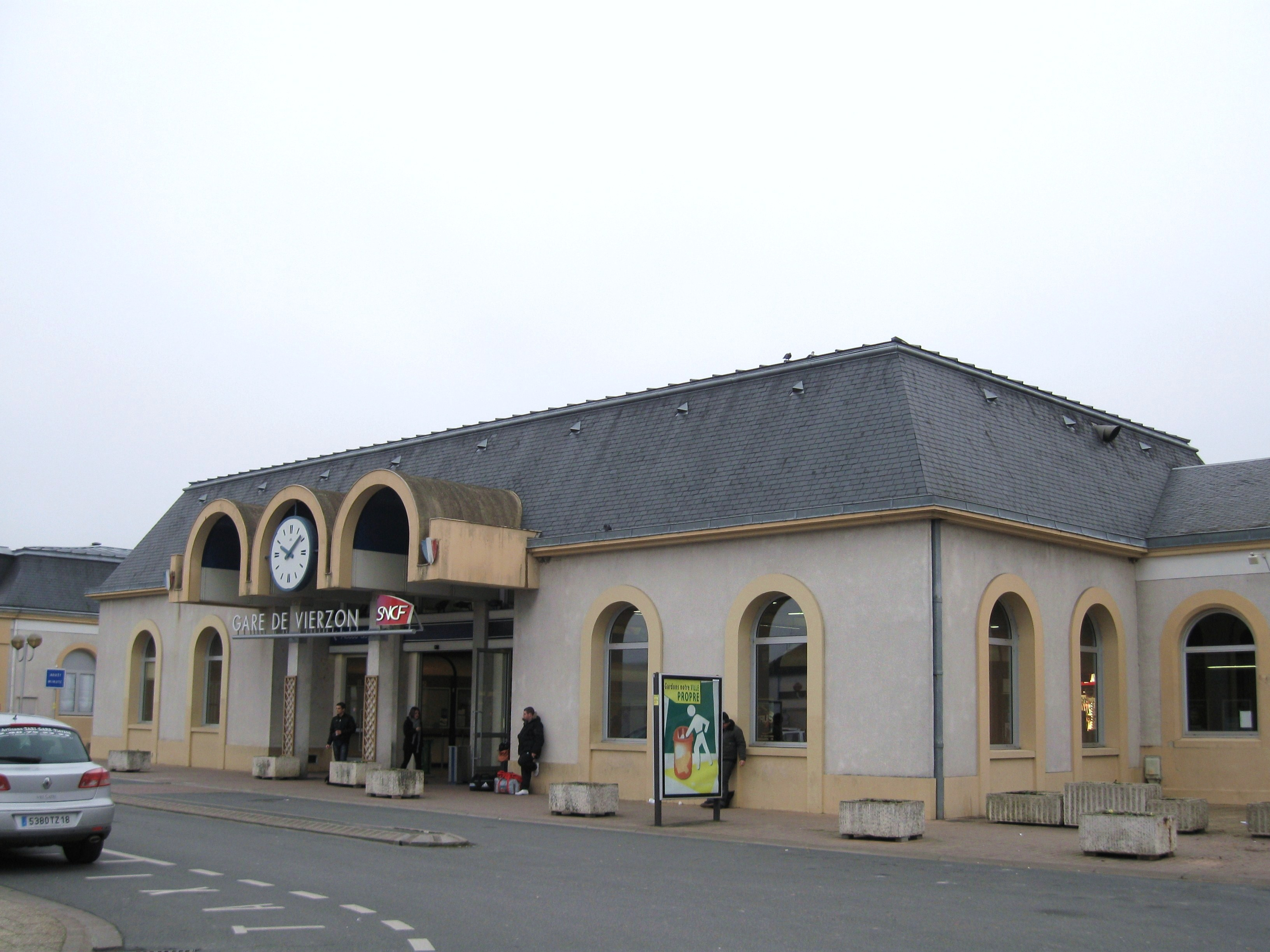
The station entrance

Gare de Vierzon-Ville is a railway station serving the town Vierzon, Cher department, central France. It is situated on the Orléans–Montauban railway, the Vierzon–Saincaize railway and the Vierzon–Saint-Pierre-des-Corps railway.

== Services ==
The station is served by Intercités (long distance) services to Paris, Toulouse, Nantes and Lyon, and by regional services (TER Centre-Val de Loire) to Nevers, Tours, Orléans and Limoges.

Preceding station	SNCF	Following station
Saint-Pierre-des-Corps towards Nantes	Intercités	Bourges towards Lyon-Perrache
Les Aubrais towards Paris-Austerlitz	Intercités	Issoudun towards Toulouse
Preceding station	Le Réseau Rémi	Following station
Theillay towards Orléans	1.2	Terminus
Terminus	1.3	Reuilly towards Limoges
Terminus	1.4	Vierzon-Forges towards Nevers
Mennetou-sur-Cher towards Tours	2.2	Terminus
