= Chartres station =

Railway station in Chartres, France

Coordinates: 48°26′54″N 1°28′52″E

Chartres
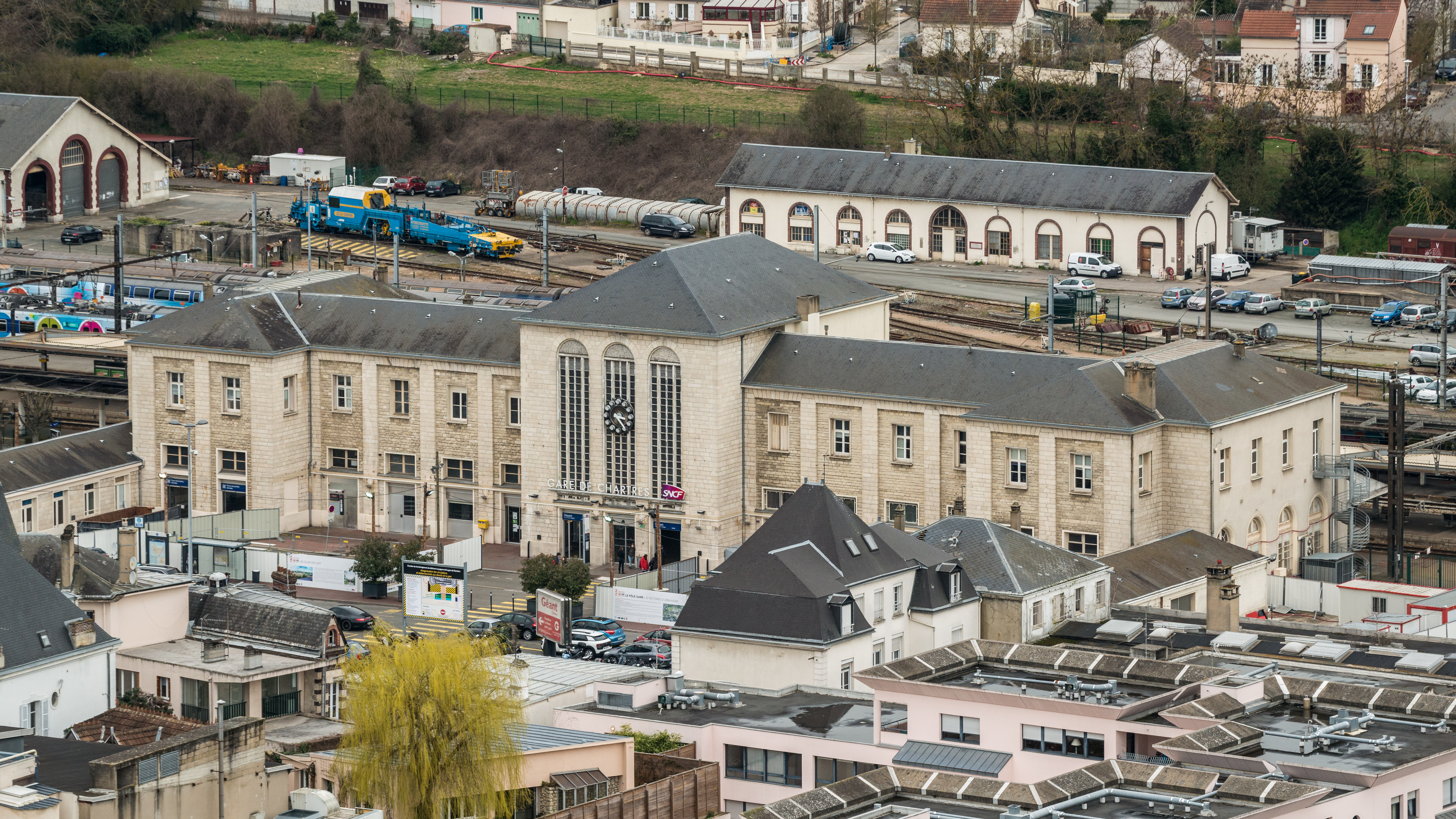

General information
- Location: 8, place Pierre-Semard; 28000 Chartres; Eure-et-Loir; France
- Elevation: 143 m (469 ft)
- Owner: SNCF
- Operator: SNCF
- Line: Paris–Brest railway
- Platforms: 4
- Tracks: 7

Construction
- Architect: Henri Pacon

Other information
- Station code: 87394007

History
- Opened: 12 July 1849

Passengers
- 2024: 3,536,538

Services
Preceding station	Le Réseau Rémi	Following station
Voves towards Tours	2.9	Terminus
Terminus	3.1	Lucé towards Courtalain-Saint-Pellerin
Amilly-Ouerray towards Le Mans	3.2	La Villette-Saint-Prest towards Paris-Montparnasse
Preceding station	Ouigo	Following station
Versailles-Chantiers towards Paris-Austerlitz	Train Classique	Le Mans towards Nantes
Location

Chartres station (French: Gare de Chartres) is a railway station serving the town of Chartres in the Eure-et-Loir department and Centre-Val de Loire region of France. It is situated on the Paris–Brest railway. The station is part of the SNCF rail network and is served by TER Centre-Val de Loire and Ouigo trains.

== History ==
The original station was built in 1849.

=== Current building ===
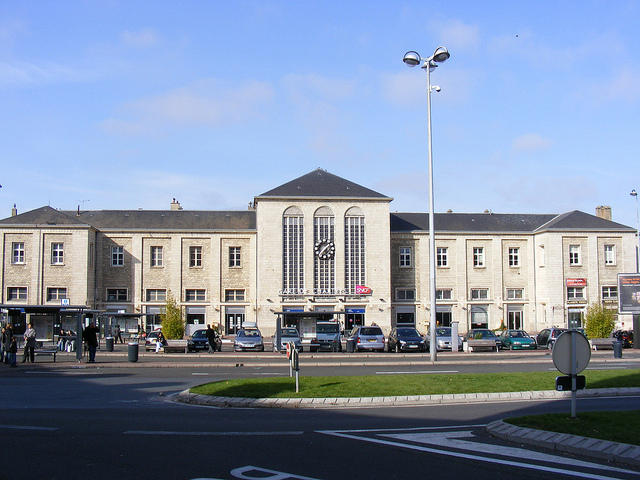
The station building in 2012.

The station has been renovated five times since 1870.

In 1933, the current building was constructed under the authority of Raoul Dautry, the directeur général of the Chemins de fer de l'État. It was designed by the French architect Henri Pacon.

Since 2018, the station has been at the centre of a vast renewal of the city's urban core. The project is set to be finished by 2030.
