= Blois station =

Railway station in Blois, France

Blois–Chambord
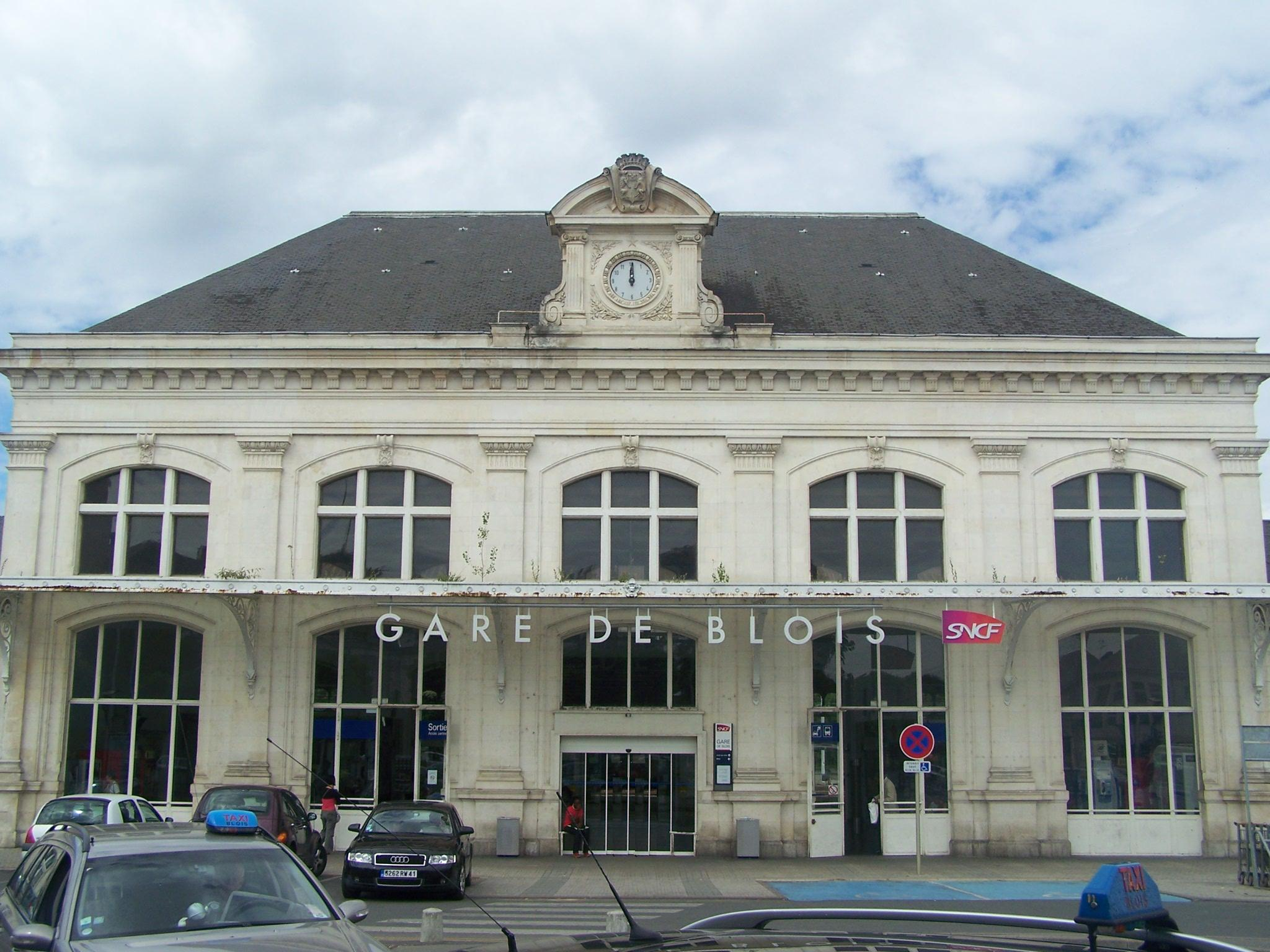
- The frontage of the station

General information
- Location: 70 boulevard Daniel Dupuis, 41000; Blois; France
- Coordinates: 47.5853°N 1.3236°E
- Elevation: 100 m (330 ft)
- Owner: RFF / SNCF
- Operator: SNCF
- Lines: Paris–Bordeaux; Villefranche-sur-Cher–Blois; Pont-de-Braye–Blois; Blois–Saint-Aignan-sur-Cher

Other information
- Station code: 87574004

Passengers
- 2024: 1,996,524

Services
Preceding station	Le Réseau Rémi	Following station
Chouzy-sur-Cisse towards Tours	2.1	La Chaussée-Saint-Victor towards Orléans
Saint-Pierre-des-Corps towards Nantes	2.6	Beaugency towards Orléans
Preceding station	Ouigo	Following station
Les Aubrais towards Paris-Austerlitz	Train Classique	Saint-Pierre-des-Corps towards Nantes
Location

The gare de Blois is a railway station serving the town Blois, Loir-et-Cher department, central France. It is situated on the Paris–Bordeaux railway, between Orléans and Tours.

== Services ==
The station is served by regional trains (TER Centre-Val de Loire) to Tours, Nantes and Orléans.
