= TER Centre-Val de Loire =

Regional rail network in France

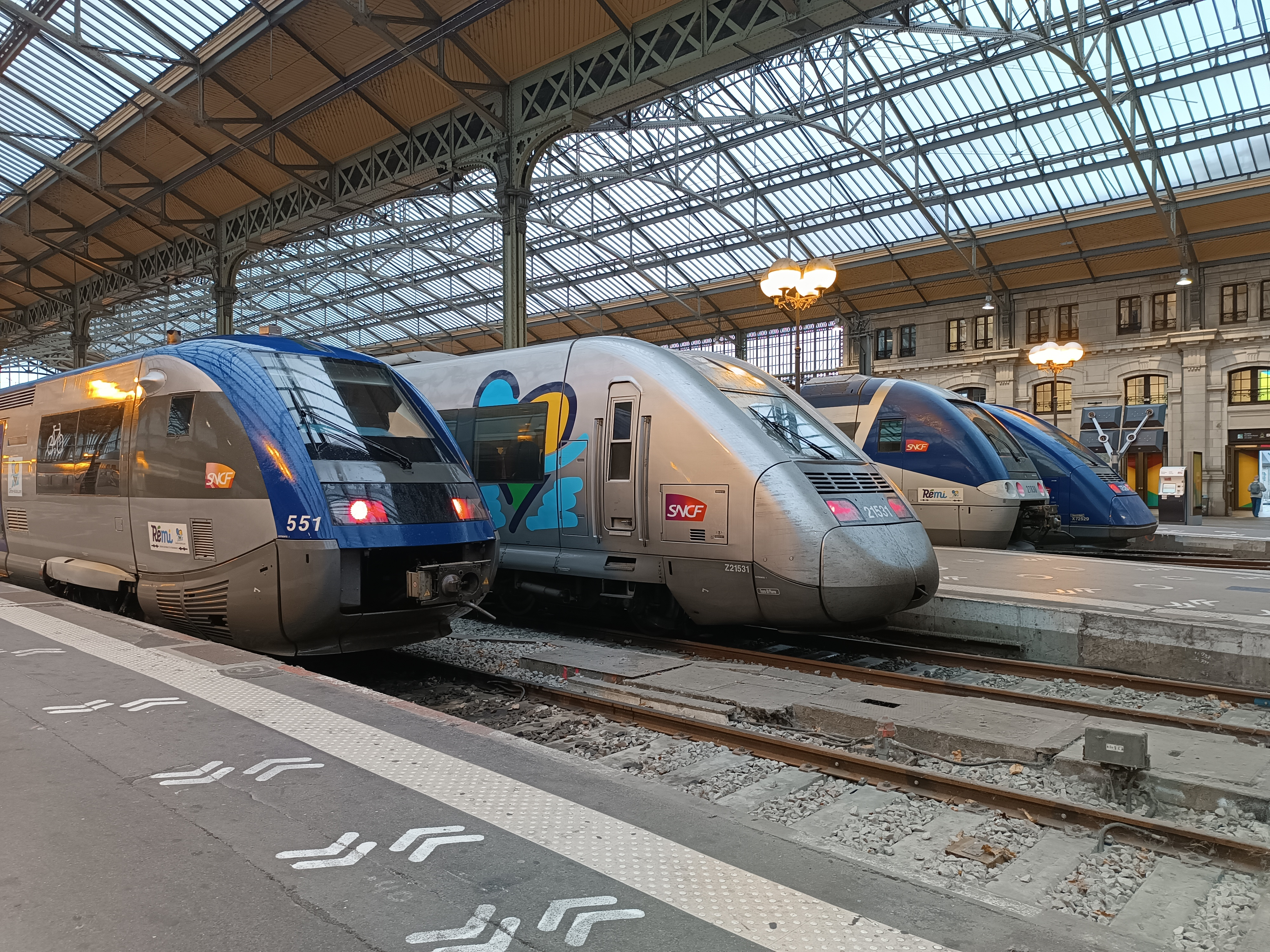
- Several trains in the Centre-Val de Loire livery at Tours station.

Overview
- Owner: SNCF
- Number of lines: 28
- Number of stations: 150
- Website: m.ter.sncf.com/centre-val-de-loire

Operation
- Operator: SNCF

Technical
- Track gauge: 1,435 mm (4 ft 8 1/2 in) standard gauge

TER Centre-Val de Loire (operated under the brand Rémi since 2019 and TER Centre prior to 2015) is the regional rail network serving Centre-Val de Loire région of France.

== Network ==
Rail transport infrastructure map of Centre-Val de Loire, showing main stations, number of tracks, power sourceand maximum speed.

The rail and bus network as of April 2022:

=== Rail ===
Line	Route
1.1	Paris Austerlitz – Étampes – Guillerval† – Monnerville† – Angerville – Boisseaux† – Toury – Château-Gaillard† – Artenay – Chevilly† – Cercottes – Les Aubrais – Orléans
1.2	Orléans ... Salbris ... Vierzon
1.3	Vierzon ... Issoudun ... Châteauroux ... Argenton-sur-Creuse ... La Souterraine ... Limoges
1.4	Vierzon ... Bourges ... Nevers
2.1	Tours – Saint-Pierre-des-Corps ... Amboise ... Blois ... Meung-sur-Loire ... Orléans
2.2	Tours – Saint-Pierre-des-Corps ... Gièvres ... Vierzon
2.3	Tours ... Loches
2.5	Tours ... Port-de-Piles ... Châtellerault ... Poitiers (see TER Nouvelle-Aquitaine line 11 for details)
2.6	Orléans – Beaugency† – Blois – Saint-Pierre-des-Corps – Tours ... Saumur – Angers – Ancenis – Nantes
2.7	Tours ... Chinon
2.8	Le Mans ... Château-du-Loir ... Tours (see TER Pays de la Loire line 25 for details)
2.9	Tours ... Château-Renault ... Vendôme ... Châteaudun ... Voves – Chartres
2.10	Vendôme ... Châteaudun ... Voves ... Dourdan – Paris-Austerlitz
3.1	Chartres ... Courtalain-Saint-Pellerin
3.2	Le Mans ... Nogent-le-Rotrou ... Chartres ... Versailles-Chantiers – Paris-Montparnasse
4.1	Bourges ... Saint-Amand-Montrond-Orval ... Montluçon
7	Valençay ... Gièvres ... Romorantin ... Salbris
† Not all trains call at this station

=== Bus ===
Line	Bus route
2.4	Tours – Loches – Châteauroux
3.1	Courtalain – Droué
4.2	Bourges – Issoudun – Châteauroux
4.3	Châteauroux – Le Blanc – Chauvigny – Poitiers
5	Mondoubleau – Vendôme
5	Vendôme-TGV – Château-Renault
6	Sancerre – Cosne-sur-Loire
6	Aubigny-sur-Nère – Gien
7	Luçay-le-Mâle – Valençay

== Rolling stock ==
=== Multiple units ===
- SNCF Class Z 5300
- SNCF Class Z 7300
- SNCF Class Z 9600
- SNCF Class Z 21500
- SNCF Class Z 26500 (ZGC Z 26500)
- SNCF Class X 4300
- SNCF Class X 72500
- SNCF Class X 73500
- SNCF Class B 81500 (BGC B 81500)

=== Locomotives ===
- SNCF Class BB 9200
- SNCF Class BB 22200
- SNCF Class BB 26000
- SNCF Class BB 67300
- SNCF Class BB 67400
- SNCF Class BB 8500
- SNCF Class BB 25500 (Transilien trains, but serving the TER Centre)

== See also ==
- SNCF
- Transport express régional
- Réseau Ferré de France
- List of SNCF stations in Centre-Val de Loire
- Centre-Val de Loire
