= Paris–Bordeaux railway =

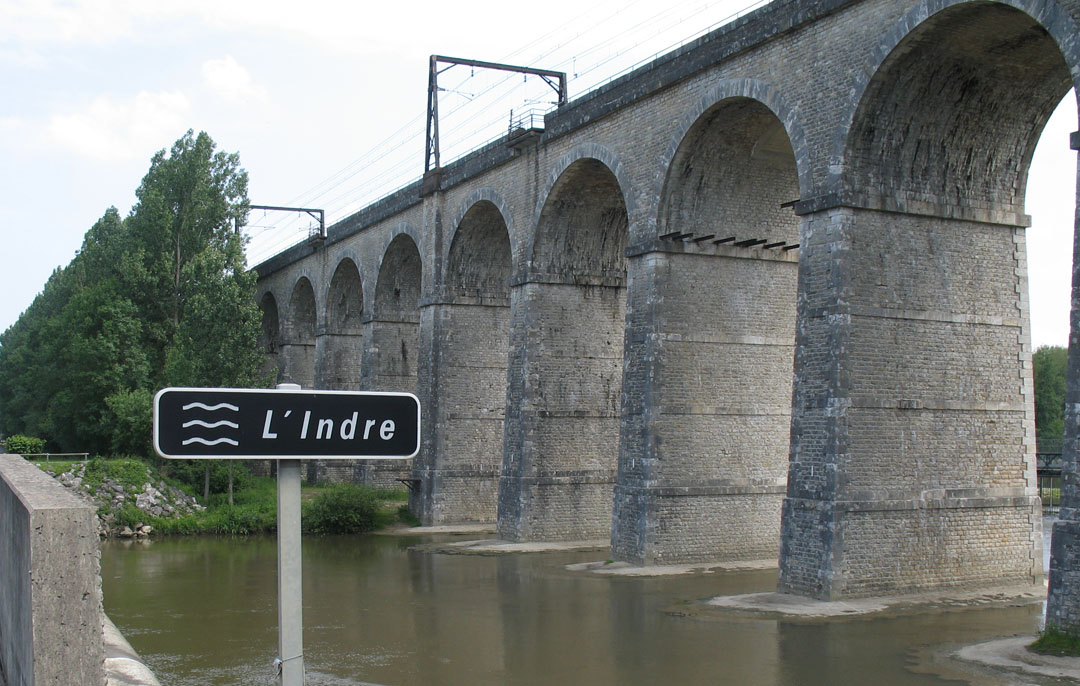
- Viaduct over the Indre

Overview
- Status: Operational
- Owner: RFF
- Locale: France (Île-de-France, Centre-Val de Loire, Nouvelle-Aquitaine)
- Termini: Gare d'Austerlitz, Paris; Bordeaux-Saint-Jean station

Service
- System: SNCF
- Operator(s): SNCF

History
- Opened: 1840-1853

Technical
- Line length: 584 km (363 mi)
- Number of tracks: Double track
- Track gauge: 1,435 mm (4 ft 8 1/2 in) standard gauge
- Electrification: 1.5 kV DC

The railway from Paris to Bordeaux is an important French 584-kilometre long railway line, that connects Paris to the southwestern port city Bordeaux via Orléans and Tours. The railway was opened in several stages between 1840 and 1853, when the section from Poitiers to Angoulême was finished. The opening of the LGV Atlantique high speed line from Paris to Tours in 1989 has decreased the importance of this section of the line for passenger traffic; the opening of the LGV Sud Europe Atlantique in 2017 has seen all long distance passenger trains migrating to that line and leaving space for more regional and local trains, as well as freight trains.

== Route ==
The Paris–Bordeaux railway leaves the Gare d'Austerlitz in Paris in southeasterly direction. It follows the left Seine bank upstream until Juvisy-sur-Orge, where it starts following the small river Orge upstream until Brétigny-sur-Orge. Between Lardy and Étampes the railway follows the small river Juine upstream. It then crosses the Beauce plains until it reaches Orléans. The Orléans station is a terminus; many long distance trains call at the nearby Les Aubrais station instead.

At Orléans the railway turns southwest, following the river Loire downstream along its right bank. It passes through Blois and Amboise, and crosses the Loire at Montlouis-sur-Loire, an eastern suburb of Tours. The Tours station is a terminus as well; many long distance trains call at the nearby Saint-Pierre-des-Corps station instead. The railway turns south again, crosses the rivers Cher and Indre, and follows the right Vienne bank upstream beyond Maillé. At Châtellerault it crosses the Vienne and continues upstream along the river Clain, through the city Poitiers.

At Voulon the railway leaves the Clain valley and it follows the Charente valley from Saint-Saviol downstream. It leaves the Charente at Ruffec, crosses it again at Luxé and passes through the city Angoulême. It follows the small rivers Tude and Dronne downstream until its mouth at Coutras, where the railway crosses the river Isle. It follows the left Isle bank downstream to Libourne, where it continues west and downstream along the left Dordogne bank. It reaches the right Garonne bank at Bassens, and crosses the river at Cenon, entering its terminus Bordeaux-Saint-Jean station after a total length of 584 km.

=== Main stations ===
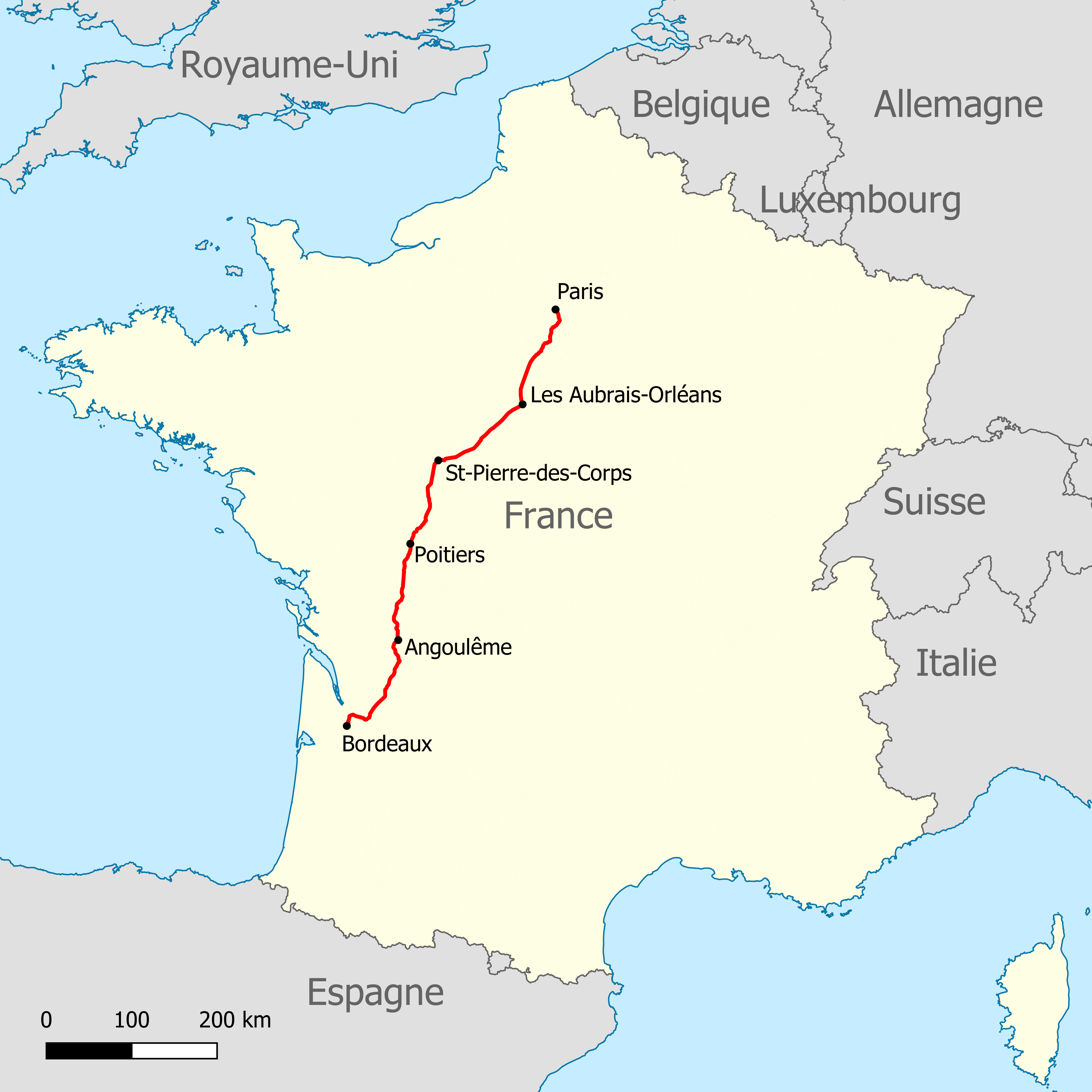
Map of Paris–Bordeaux line

The main stations on the Paris–Bordeaux railway are:

- Gare d'Austerlitz (Paris)
- Les Aubrais
- Orléans
- Saint-Pierre-des-Corps
- Tours
- Poitiers
- Angoulême
- Bordeaux-Saint-Jean

== History ==
The sections Paris–Orléans and Orléans–Bordeaux were built and exploited by two different companies, that became part of Chemin de Fer de Paris à Orléans in 1852. The first section that was opened in 1840 led from Paris to Juvisy-sur-Orge, a southern suburb. The line was extended to Orléans in 1843. Tours was reached in 1846, and Poitiers in 1851. In 1852 Bordeaux was connected with Angoulême. Finally in 1853 the section from Poitiers to Angoulême was opened. The Gare d'Austerlitz is the original terminus of the Paris–Bordeaux line. At the occasion of the 1900 Exposition Universelle the Gare d'Orsay was opened as the new terminus, with a more central location. The richly decorated Gare d'Orsay was only used by electric trains. After 1939 it was only used for suburban trains. Since 1986, the station building is a museum of 19th-century art.

== Services ==
The Paris–Bordeaux railway is used by the following passenger services:

- TGV on the section between Juvisy and Orléans
- Intercités from Paris to Montluçon and from Paris to Toulouse (on the section between Paris and Orléans), from Bordeaux to Lyon (on the section between Coutras and Bordeaux) and from Paris to Tours
- TER Centre-Val de Loire and TER Nouvelle-Aquitaine regional services on the whole line
- RER Paris rapid transit line C on the section between Paris and Étampes
