= Orléans station =

Railway station in France

Orléans
- The station concourse in 2013

General information
- Location: Avenue de Paris, 45000; Orléans; France
- Coordinates: 47.9078°N 1.9047°E
- Elevation: 114 m (374 ft)
- Owner: SNCF
- Operator: SNCF
- Lines: Aubrais-Orléans–Orléans; Orléans–Gien; Chartres–Orléans

Other information
- Station code: 87543009

History
- Opened: 5 May 1843

Passengers
- 2024: 5,221,422
Services
Preceding station	Le Réseau Rémi	Following station
Terminus	1.1	Les Aubrais towards Paris-Austerlitz
Terminus	1.2	Saint-Cyr-en-Val-La Source towards Vierzon
La Chapelle-Saint-Mesmin towards Tours	2.1	Terminus
Beaugency towards Nantes	2.6	Terminus
Location

Orléans station (French: Gare d'Orléans) is a railway station serving the city of Orléans, Loiret department, central France. It is situated on the Paris–Bordeaux railway. The Gare d'Orléans is a terminus station, and therefore TGV and most other long-distance trains only serve the nearby Les Aubrais station.

== Services ==
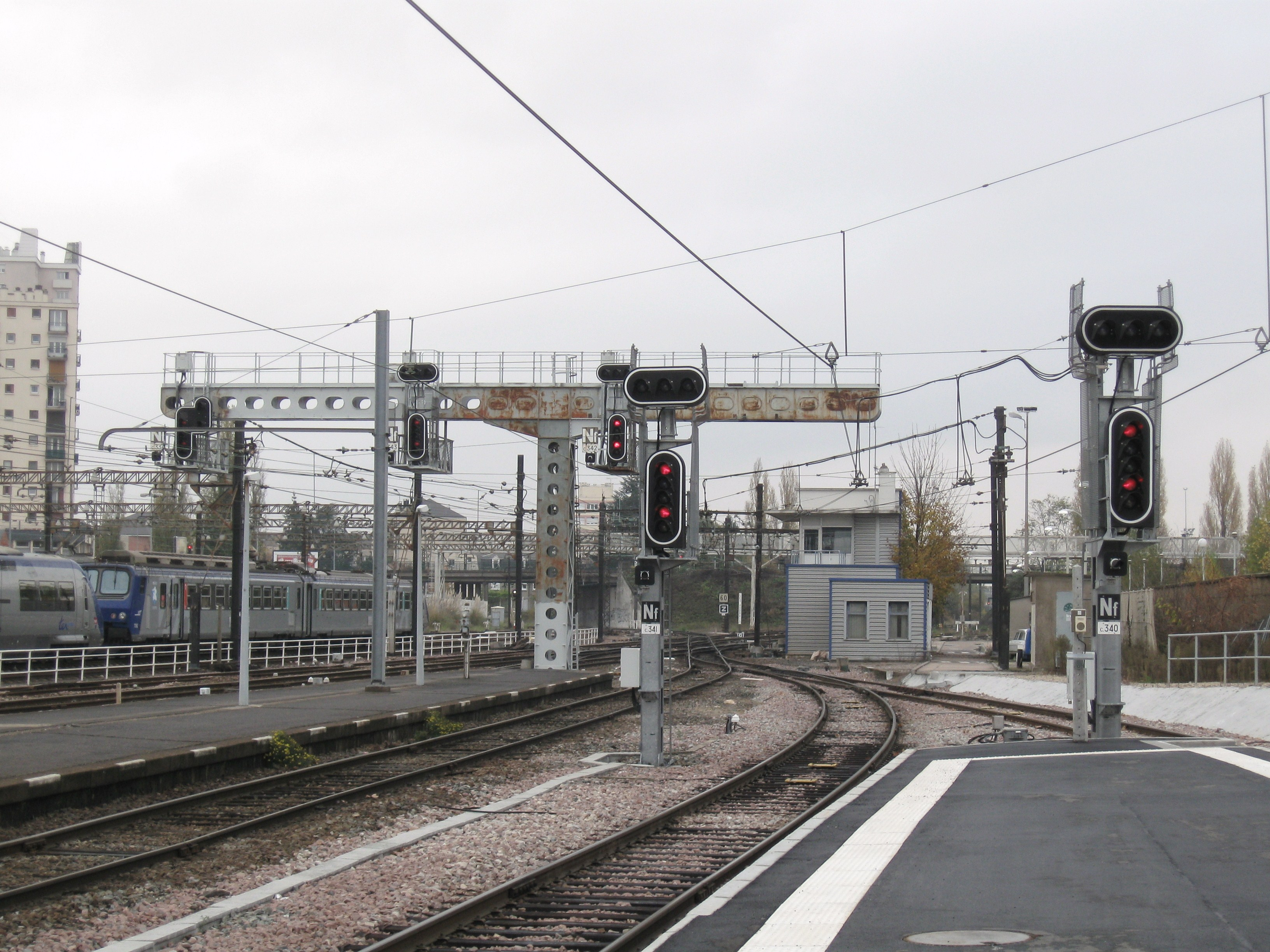
Station platform

The station is served by regional trains (TER Centre-Val de Loire) to Tours, Blois, Vierzon and Paris.
