= Tours station =

Railway station serving the city of Tours, France

Tours
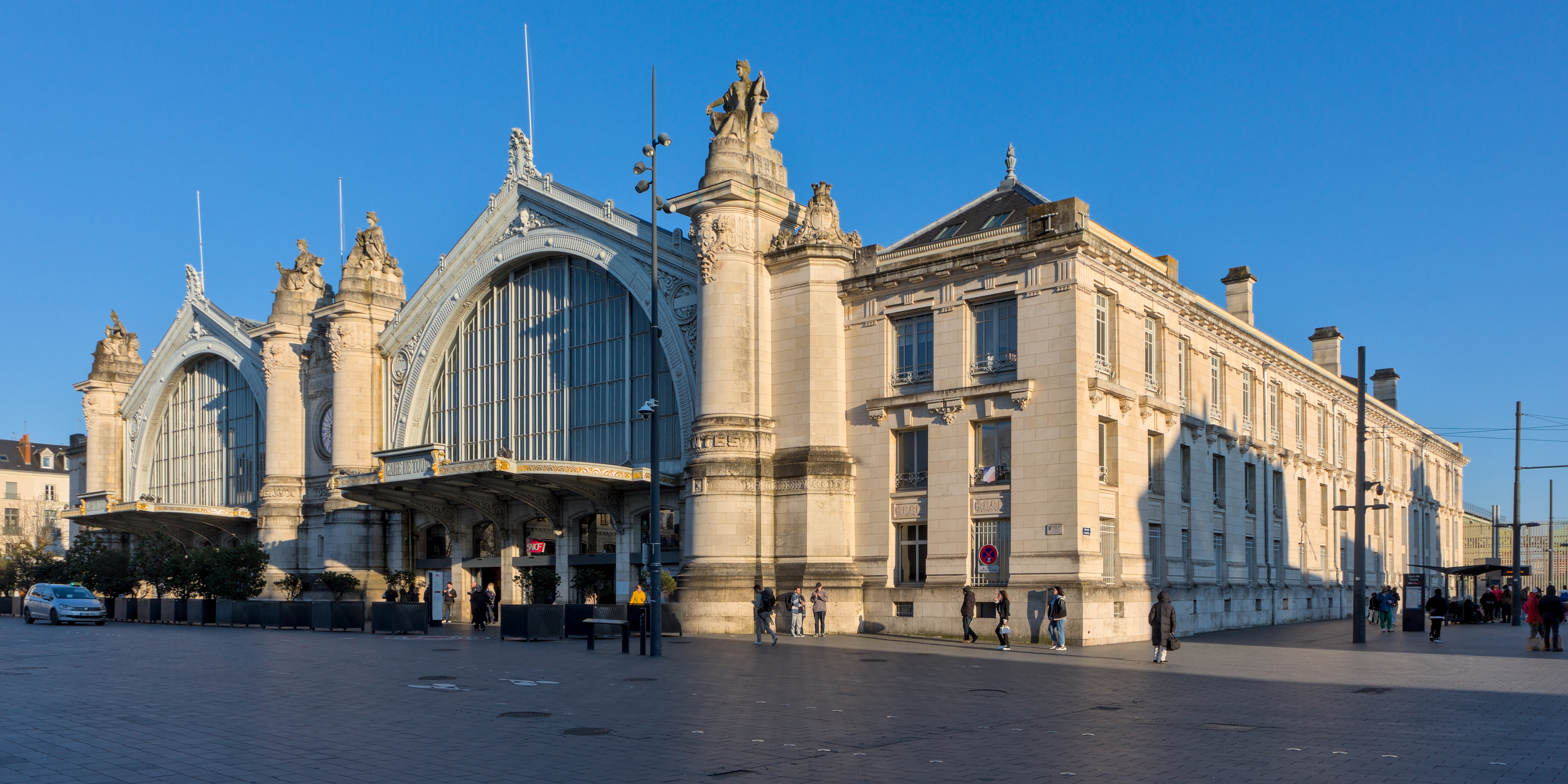
- Tours railway station frontage

General information
- Location: Place du Général-Leclerc; 37000 Tours; France
- Coordinates: 47°23′23″N 0°41′37″E
- Owner: SNCF
- Operator: SNCF
- Lines: Intercités, TER
- Platforms: 6
- Tracks: 12

Construction
- Architect: Victor Laloux

Other information
- Station code: 87571000; IATA: XJT

History
- Opened: 1846

Passengers
- 2024: 7,013,155
Services
Preceding station	Le Réseau Rémi	Following station
Terminus	2.1	Saint-Pierre-des-Corps towards Orléans
Terminus	2.2	Saint-Pierre-des-Corps towards Vierzon
Terminus	2.3	Joué-lès-Tours towards Loches
Saumur towards Nantes	2.6	Saint-Pierre-des-Corps towards Orléans
Terminus	2.7	Joué-lès-Tours towards Chinon
Terminus	2.9	Notre-Dame-d'Oé towards Chartres
Preceding station	TER Pays de la Loire	Following station
Langeais towards La Roche-sur-Yon	14	Terminus
Saint-Genouph towards Angers	19	Terminus
La Membrolle-sur-Choisille towards Le Mans	25	Terminus
Preceding station	TER Nouvelle-Aquitaine	Following station
Terminus	11	Monts towards Poitiers
Preceding station	SNCF	Following station
Saint-Pierre-des-Corps towards Montparnasse	TGV	Terminus
Location

Tours station (French: Gare de Tours) is a railway station serving the city of Tours, Indre-et-Loire department, western France. It is situated on the Paris–Bordeaux railway, the Tours–Saint-Nazaire railway, and the non-electrified Tours–Le Mans railway. The Gare de Tours is a terminus; most TGV trains only serve the nearby Gare de Saint-Pierre-des-Corps.

== Location ==
Established at a terminus at 49 meters above sea level, the Tours station is the origin of the line of the Tours–Saint-Nazaire railway and of the line from Tours–Le Mans railway. Not being located on the Paris-Austerlitz to Bordeaux-Saint-Jean line, Tours station is connected by two connections. The connection from Saint-Pierre-des-Corps to Tours in the direction of Paris-Austerlitz and the connection from Tours to Monts (branches of the Bordeaux line) towards Bordeaux-Saint-Jean. Until May 5, 1970, it was the terminus station of the Sables-d'Olonne line, whose route from the terminal was abandoned from Joué-lès-Tours station, in favor of a connection created between this last station and the line from Paris-Austerlitz to Bordeaux-Saint-Jean, south of Tours.

The first station in the direction of Saint-Nazaire is that of Gare Saint-Genouph. In the direction of Mans, the first station open is that of Gare de La Membrolle-sur-Choisille, after that which is now closed at Fondettes - Saint-Cyr. In the direction of Paris-Austerlitz, the first station is that of Gare de Saint-Pierre-des-Corps and in the direction of Bordeaux-Saint-Jean, that of Gare de Monts.

== History ==
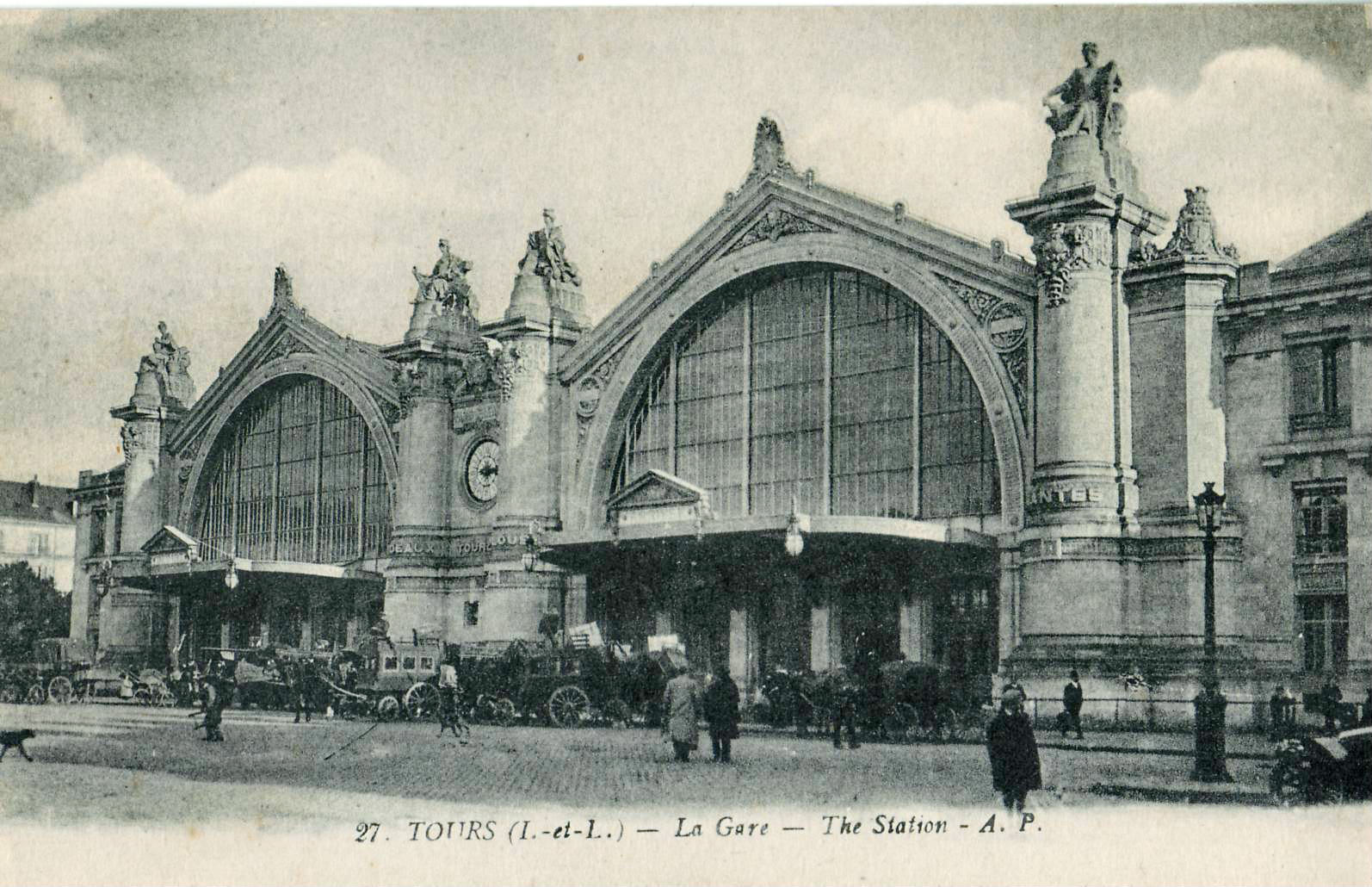
Old postcard of the station

The first railway station for Tours (called L’Embarcadère) was built in 1846 by Phidias Vestier, on the site of the current Place du Général-Leclerc, Tours, like Orléans, having accepted service rail late. It is operated by the Compagnie du chemin de fer de Paris à Orléans. The Vendée station, serving Les Sables-d'Olonne, was built on behalf of the Compagnie des chemins de fer de la Vendée in 1875, west of the first station.

The current passenger building was built between 1896 and 1898 under the direction of tourangeau architect Victor Laloux, with four allegorical limestone statues of cities by Jean Antoine Injalbert (Bordeaux and Toulouse) and Jean-Baptiste Hugues (Limoges and Nantes). The purpose of this project was to merge the equipment of Paris-Orléans and the State Railways (which had acquired the Chemins de fer de la Vendée). It has been listed as a monument historique since 28 December 1984.

Between the end of the 19th century and the Second World War, the railways and workshops of the railway companies occupied a large area of the city of Tours; these spaces were urbanized to form the districts of Sanitas and the Rotunda.

As part of the construction of the first Tours tramway in 2013, annexes to the station were destroyed, as well as the buildings on the Rue de Nantes which linked the Rue des Aumônes to the Place du Général-Leclerc along the station. The Rue de Nantes is replaced by the tramway, while the west facade of the station is open to facilitate access to the new Gare de Tours station.

In 2018, according to SNCF estimates, the annual usage of the station was 4,690,784 passengers and if non-passengers are included, its usage rises to 5,863,480.

== Passenger Services ==
=== Welcome ===
A SNCF station, it has a passenger building, with a ticket office, open every day and equipped with automatic ticket vending machines. It is equipped with 6 platforms serving 12 lanes. The platform serving tracks D and E, and the platform serving tracks F and G are more than 443 meters, making it possible to receive two SNCF TGV Atlantique trainsets.

=== Station ===
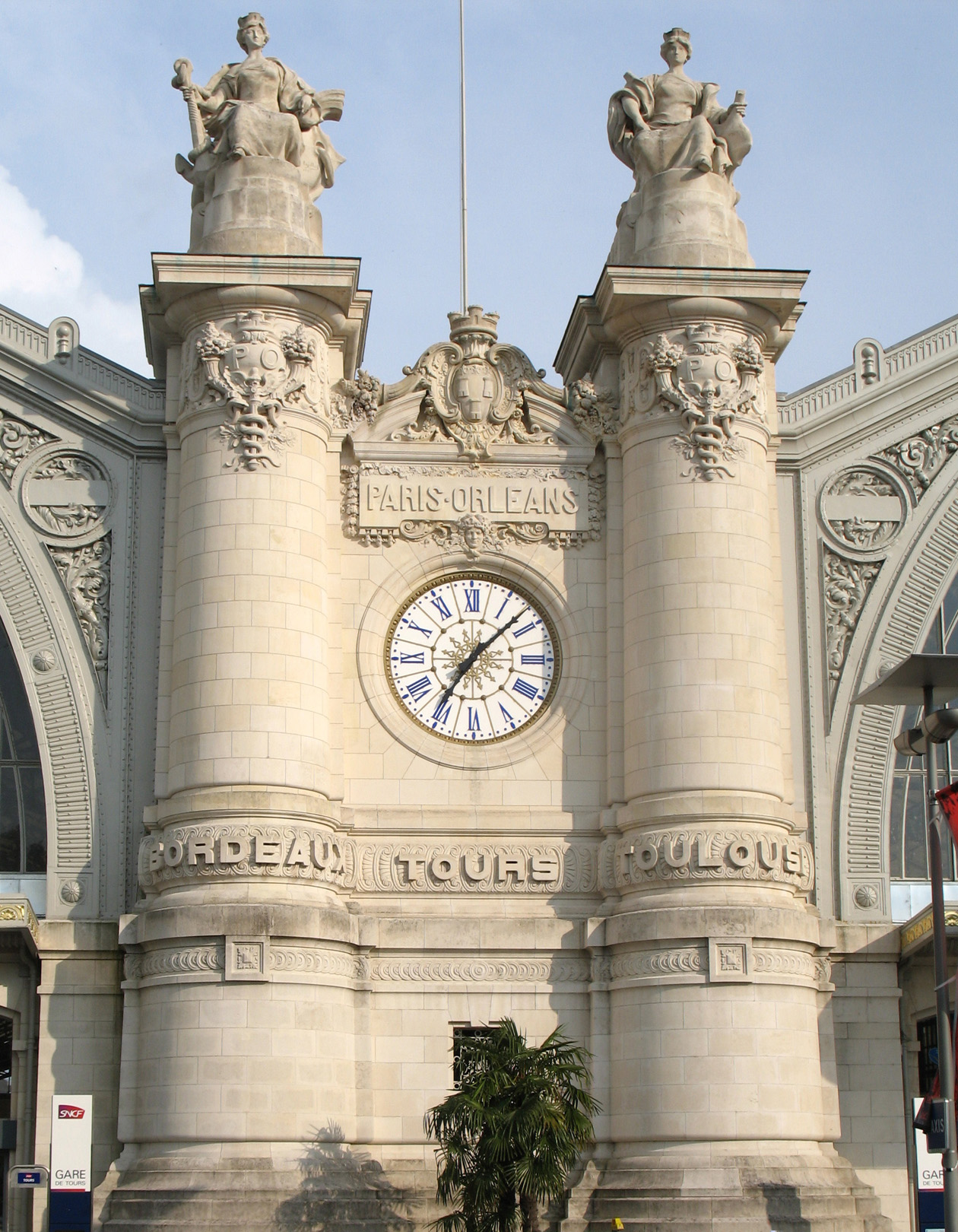
Front of the station

The building brings together four materials: stone (for the facade and its statues), iron (as the supporting structure), cast iron (especially for the decoration of the interior columns) and glass (with two large canopies on the facade to provide lightness and transparency).

Four statues dominate the building. Two directed by Jean-Antoine Injalbert (allegories of Bordeaux and Toulouse), and two directed by Jean-Baptiste Hugues (allegories of Limoges and Nantes). The painted earthenware panels, produced between 1896 and 1898, are by Eugène Martial Simas.

The Tours-Center station underwent a refurbishment of its interior and facade work in 2006. Gold leaf was thus laid, as the Laloux project initially planned.

The refurbishment of the building continued until 2013. Thus, the interior layout was revised and openings were made to the west of the building to create a third entrance. At the same time, the large passenger hall was being restored with the metallic elements of the frame being re-painted; likewise, the zinc cover and the translucent cover (with polycarbonate in place of polyester) were redone.

=== Services ===
The following services currently call at Tours:

- regional services (TER Centre-Val de Loire) Tours - Blois - Orléans
- regional services (TER Centre-Val de Loire) Tours - Gièvres - Vierzon
- local services (TER Centre-Val de Loire) Tours - Loches
- regional services (TER Centre-Val de Loire) Nantes - Angers - Tours - Blois - Orléans
- local services (TER Centre-Val de Loire) Tours - Chinon
- regional services (TER Centre-Val de Loire) Tours - Vendôme - Chartres
- regional services (TER Pays de la Loire) La Roche-sur-Yon - Bressuire - Thouars - Saumur - Tours
- local services (TER Pays de la Loire) Angers - Saumur - Tours
- local services (TER Pays de la Loire) Le Mans - Château-du-Loir - Tours
- regional services (TER Normandie) Caen - Alençon - Le Mans - Tours

=== Other transport connections ===
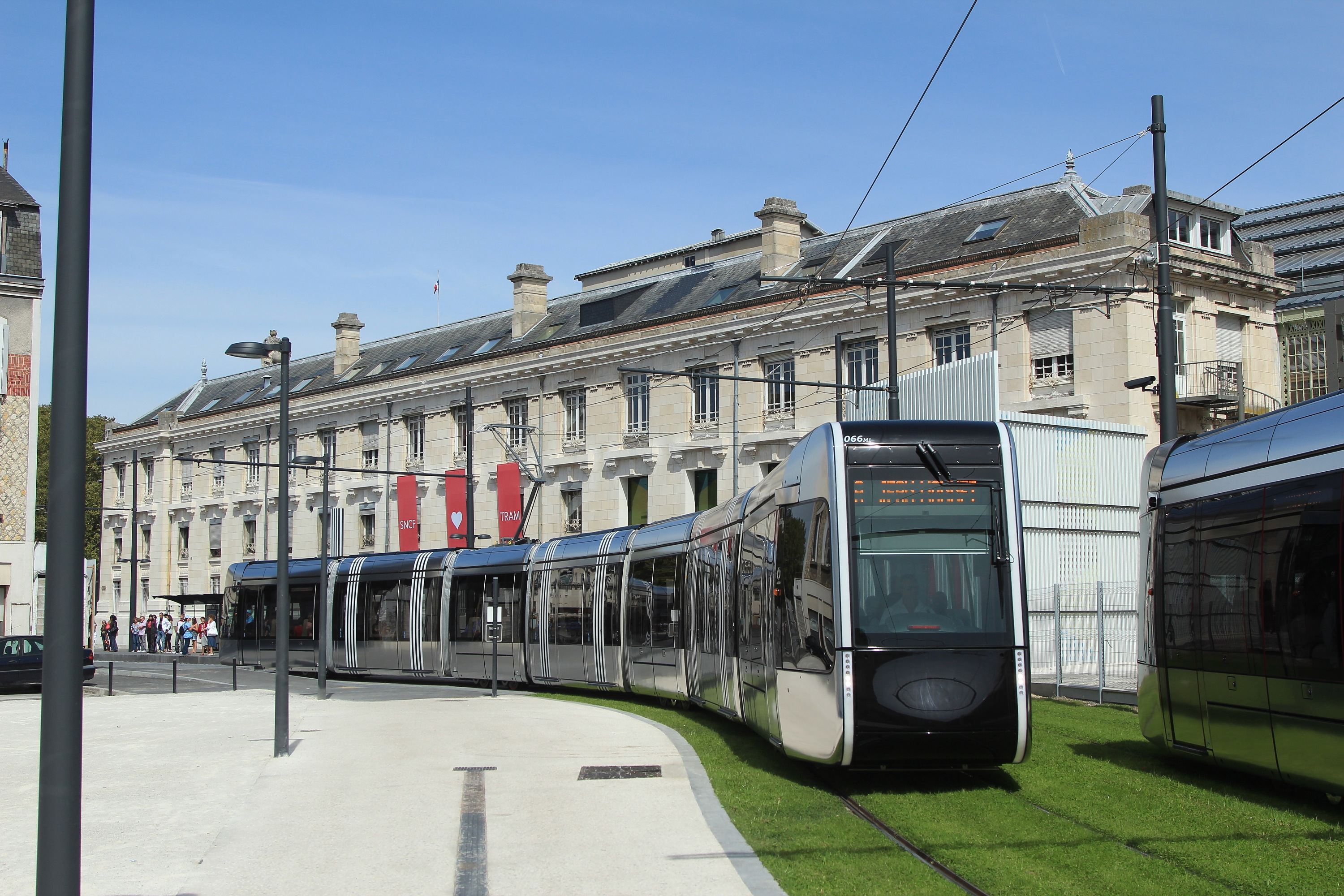
Tram service

The station is connected to the Fil bleu urban transport network, in particular line A of the Tours tramway, which came into service on 31 August 2013. On this occasion, new access was created on the west facade of the station (Rue de Nantes) to allow direct correspondence from the Salle des Pas Perdus.

It is also in connection with line 2 Tempo which is a high level of service bus line (BHNS) and bus lines 3a / b, 5, 10, 11, 14, 15, 17, 19, 34, 50, 100, 110, 112, 114, 117, 118, either directly in front of the station (Gare de Tours stop), or at the end of the forecourt, on Boulevard Heurteloup (Gare Vinci stop).

Access to the Réseau de mobilité interurbaine (Rémi) is on the forecourt of the station at the rest area.

School circuits organized by Communauté de communes or Syndicat intercommunal des transports scolaires (SITS) in neighboring municipalities also serve Tours station, at the rest area.

=== Freight ===
This station is open to freight traffic.
