= Château-Gaillard station =

Railway station in Santilly, France

Coordinates: 48°08′29″N 1°54′44″E

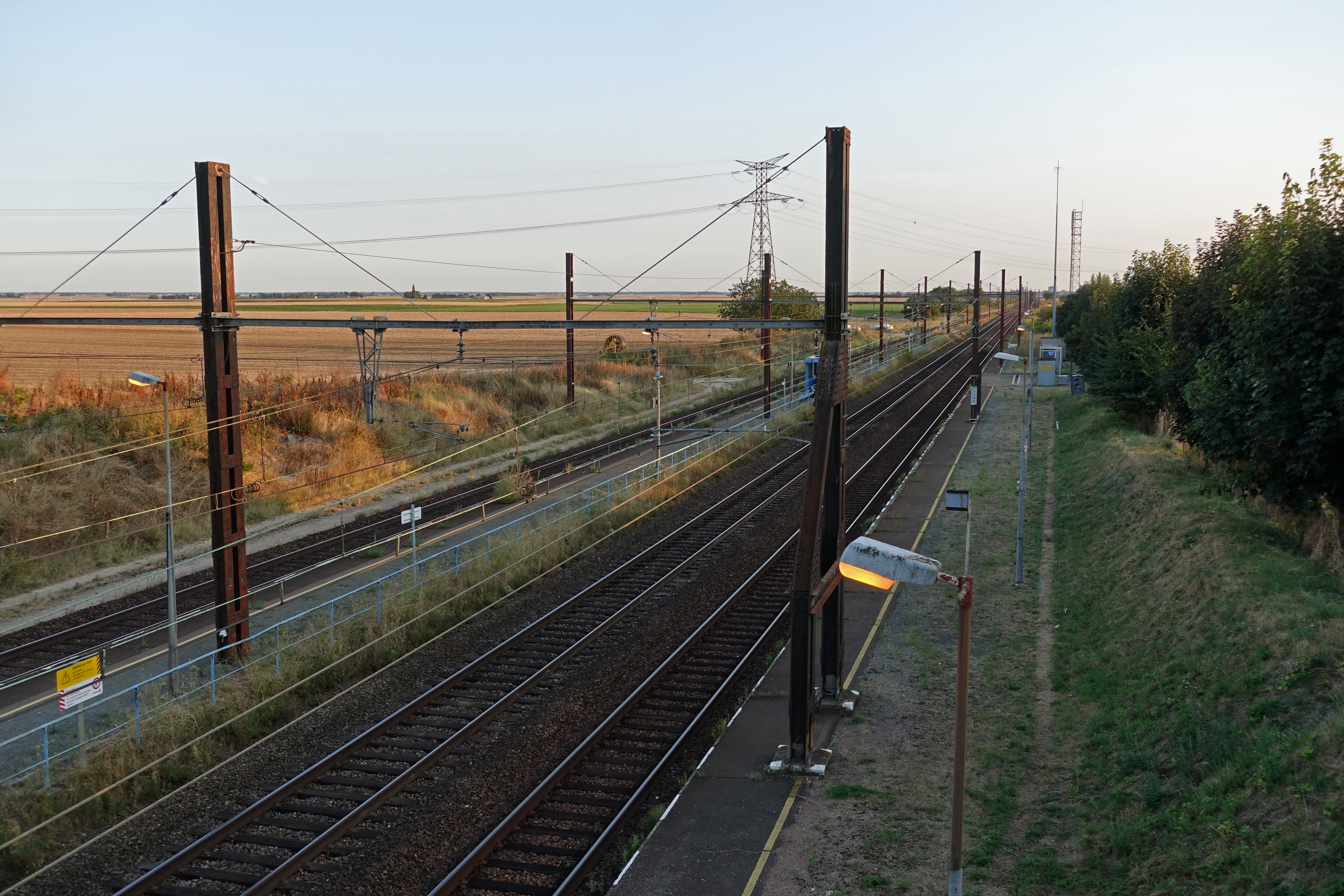
Château-Gaillard railway

Château-Gaillard is a railway station in Château-Gaillard near Santilly, Centre-Val de Loire, France. The station was opened on 5 May 1843, and is located on the Paris–Bordeaux railway line, about 95 km outside Paris.

The station is served by regional trains (TER Centre-Val de Loire) to Orléans, Étampes and Paris. The station is served by about 6 trains per day in each direction.

| Preceding station | Le Réseau Rémi | Following station |
|---|---|---|
| Artenay towards Orléans | 1.1 | Toury towards Paris-Austerlitz |
