= Toury station =

Railway station in Toury, France

Coordinates: 48°11′36″N 1°56′23″E

Toury is a railway station in Toury, Centre-Val de Loire, France. The station was opened on 5 May 1843, and is located on the Paris–Bordeaux railway line, about 90 km outside Paris.

The station is served by regional trains (TER Centre-Val de Loire) to Orléans, Étampes and Paris. The station is served by about 6 trains per day in each direction.

Preceding station	Le Réseau Rémi	Following station
Château-Gaillard towards Orléans	1.1	Boisseaux towards Paris-Austerlitz

== Gallery ==
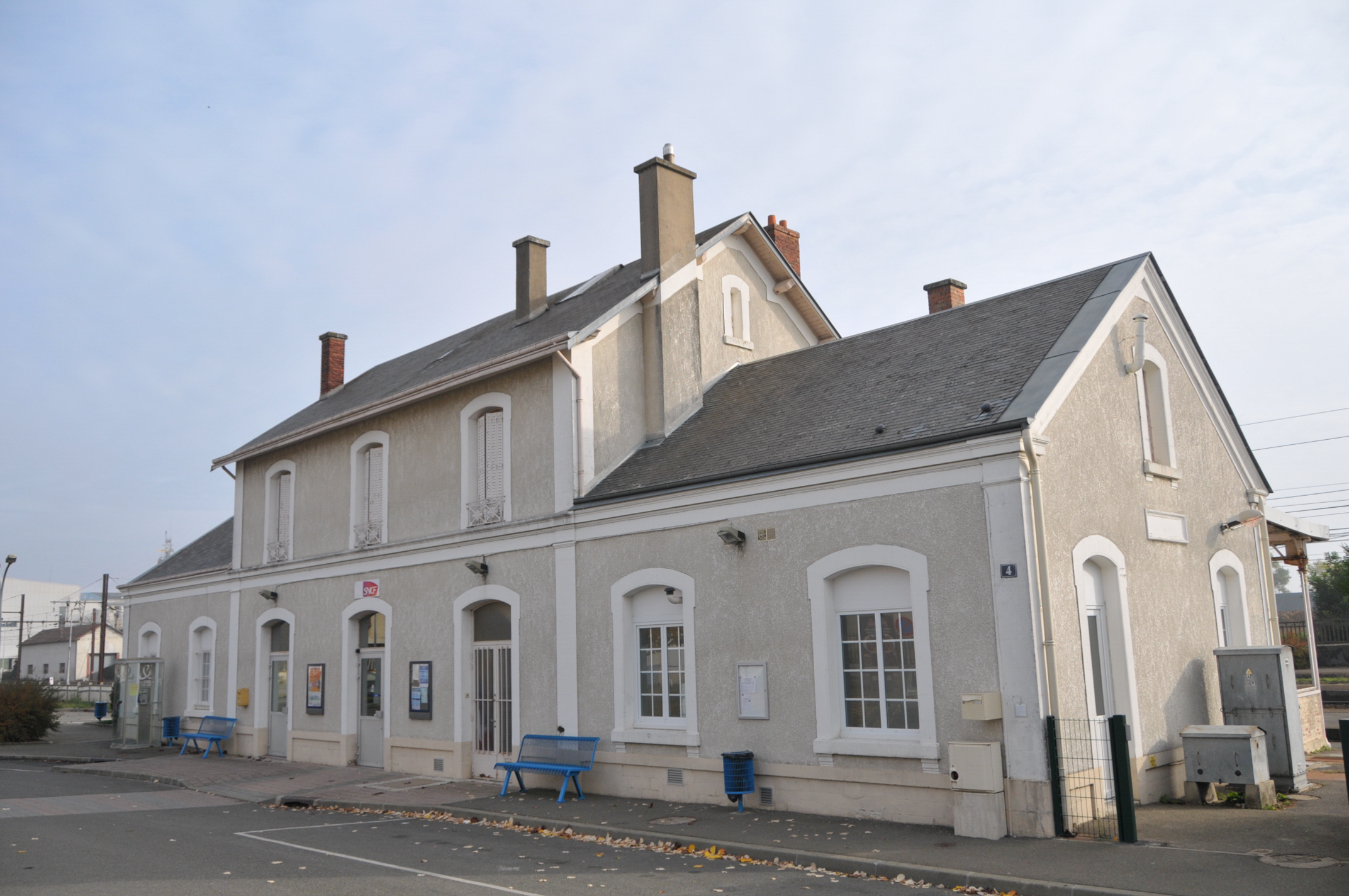
The station building

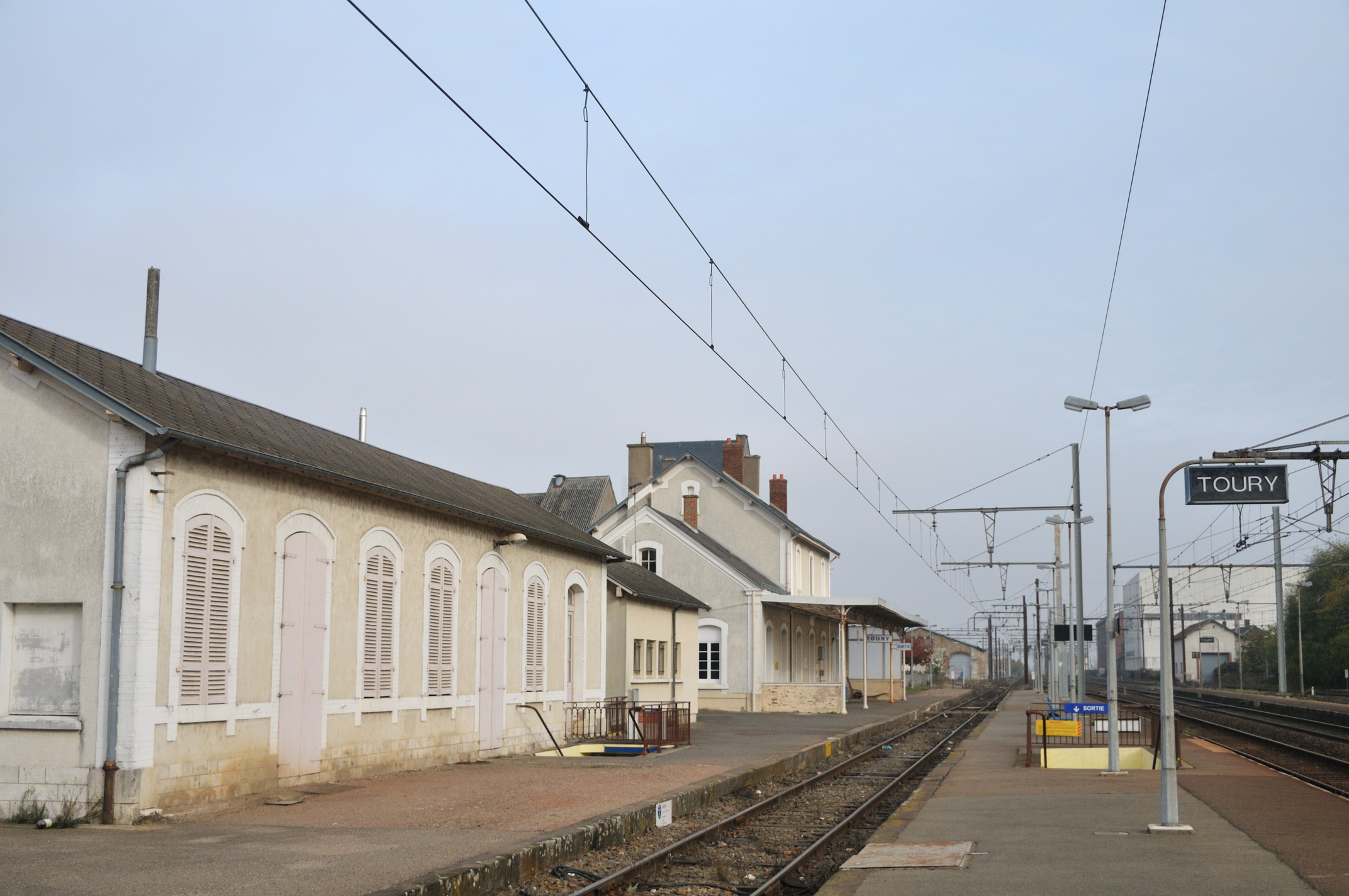
The station
