= Santilly =

Santilly may refer to:

- Santilly, Eure-et-Loir, a commune in the French region of Centre
- Santilly, Saône-et-Loire, a commune in the French region of Bourgogne
- Ray Santilli, British film producer, known for his exploitation in 1995 of the controversial "alien autopsy" footage.
