= Monnerville station =

Railway station in Monnerville, France

Monnerville
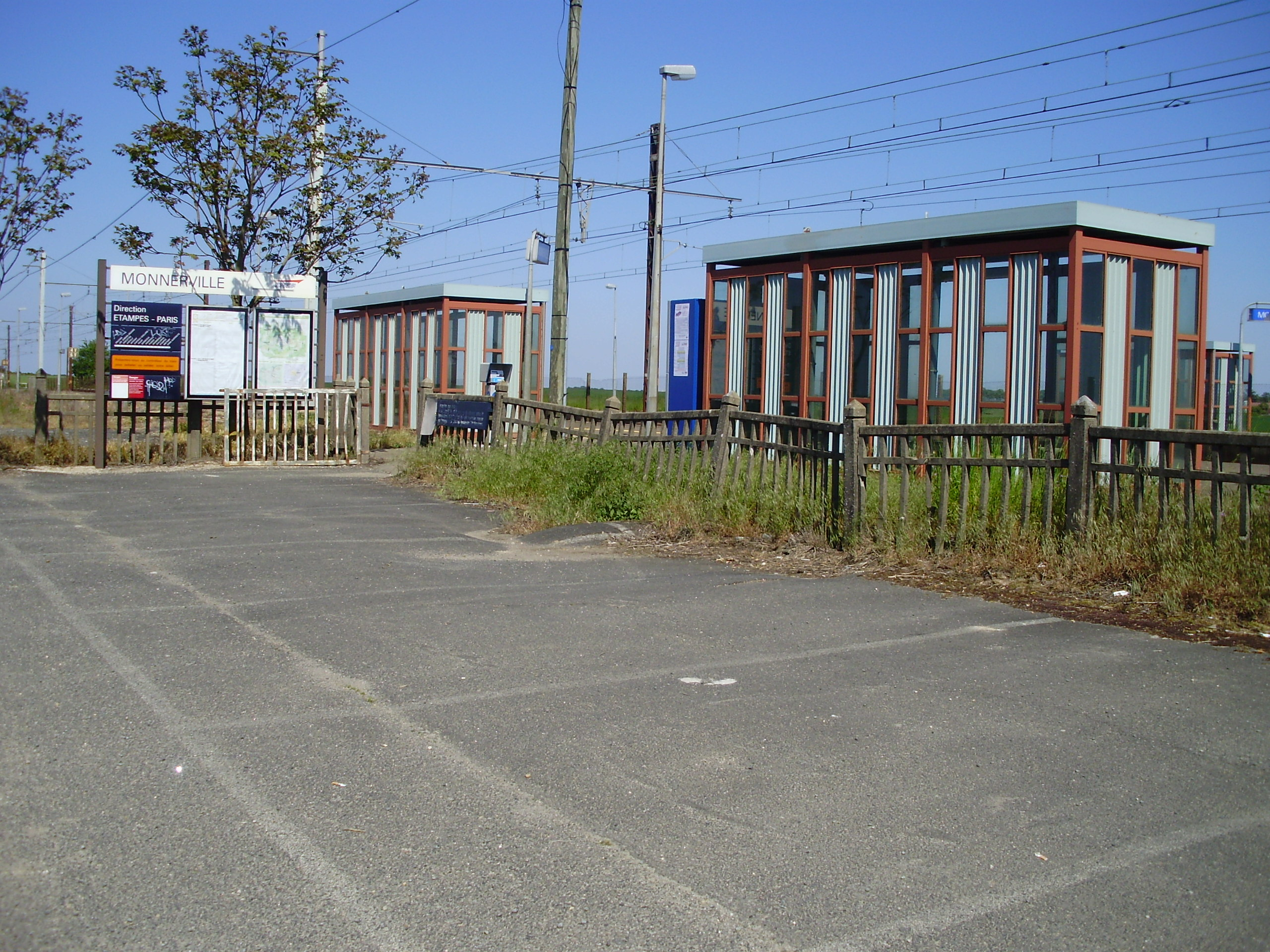
- Entrance to the Monnerville station platform in 2010

General information
- Location: Le Champ Martin; 91930 Monnerville; Essonne, France
- Coordinates: 48.347778°N 2.032222°E
- Elevation: 144 m (472 ft)
- Owner: SNCF
- Operator: SNCF
- Line: Paris–Bordeaux railway
- Distance: 69.793 km
- Platforms: 2
- Tracks: 3
- Train operators: TER Centre-Val de Loire

History
- Opened: 5 May 1843

Passengers
- 2020: 13,925
Location

Monnerville station (French: Gare de Monnerville) is a French railway station located in the commune of Monnerville, Essone department in the Île de France region. Established at an altitude of 144 m, Monnerville station is situated at kilometric point (KP) 69.793 on the Paris—Bordeaux railway between the stations of Guillerval and Angerville.

As of 2022, the station is owned and operated by the SNCF and served by TER Centre-Val de Loire regional trains to Orléans, Étampes, and Paris. The station is served by about 3 trains per day in each direction.

== History ==
The station opened on 5 May 1843, and is on the Paris–Bordeaux railway line, about 70 kilometres (43 mi) outside Paris.

=== Annual use ===
According to SNCF estimates, annual passenger numbers for Monnerville station are as follows:

Year	2015	2016	2017	2018	2019	2020
Number of passengers	21,882	22,958	23,991	24,487	25,461	13,925

== Gallery ==
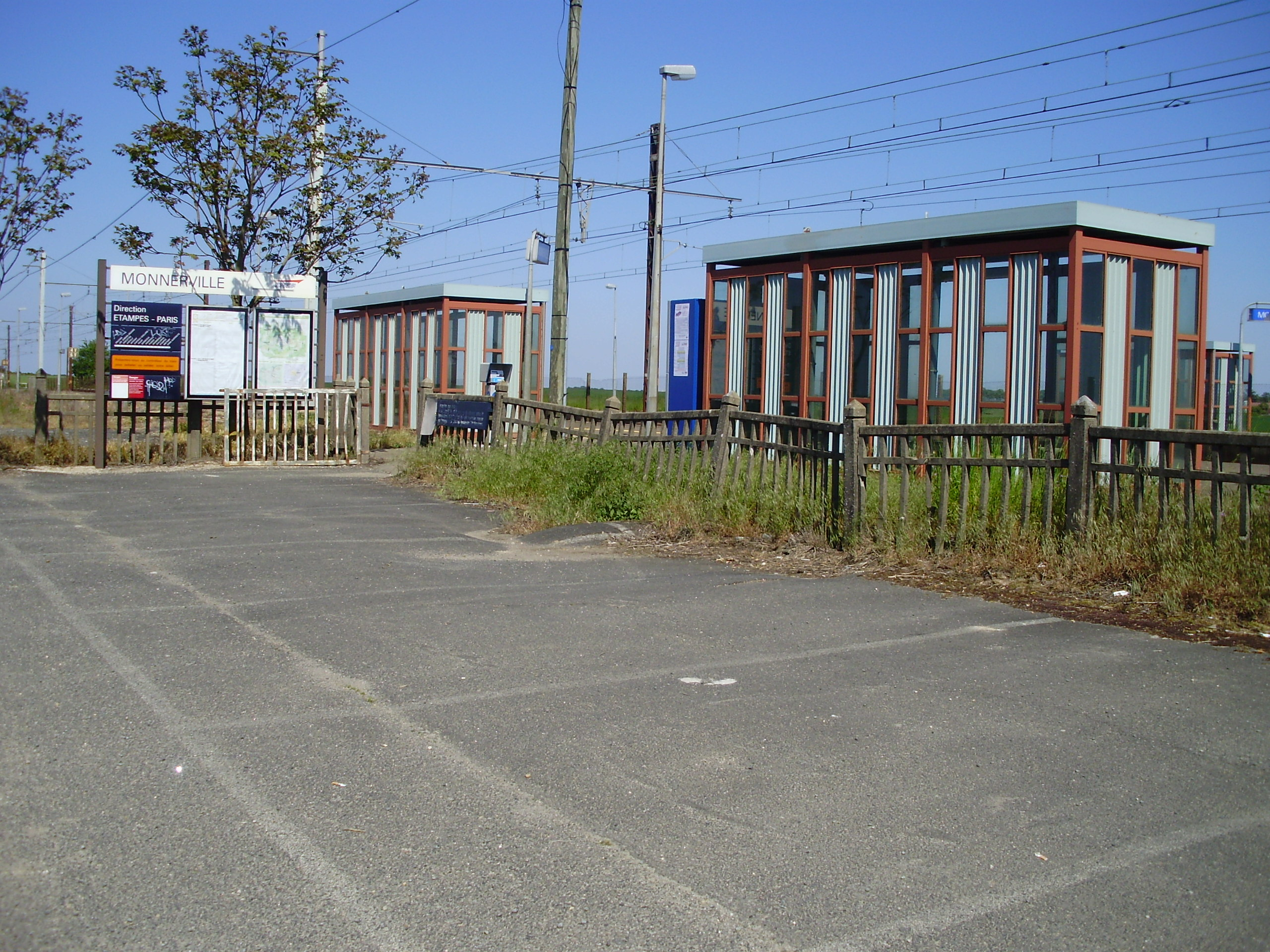
The station

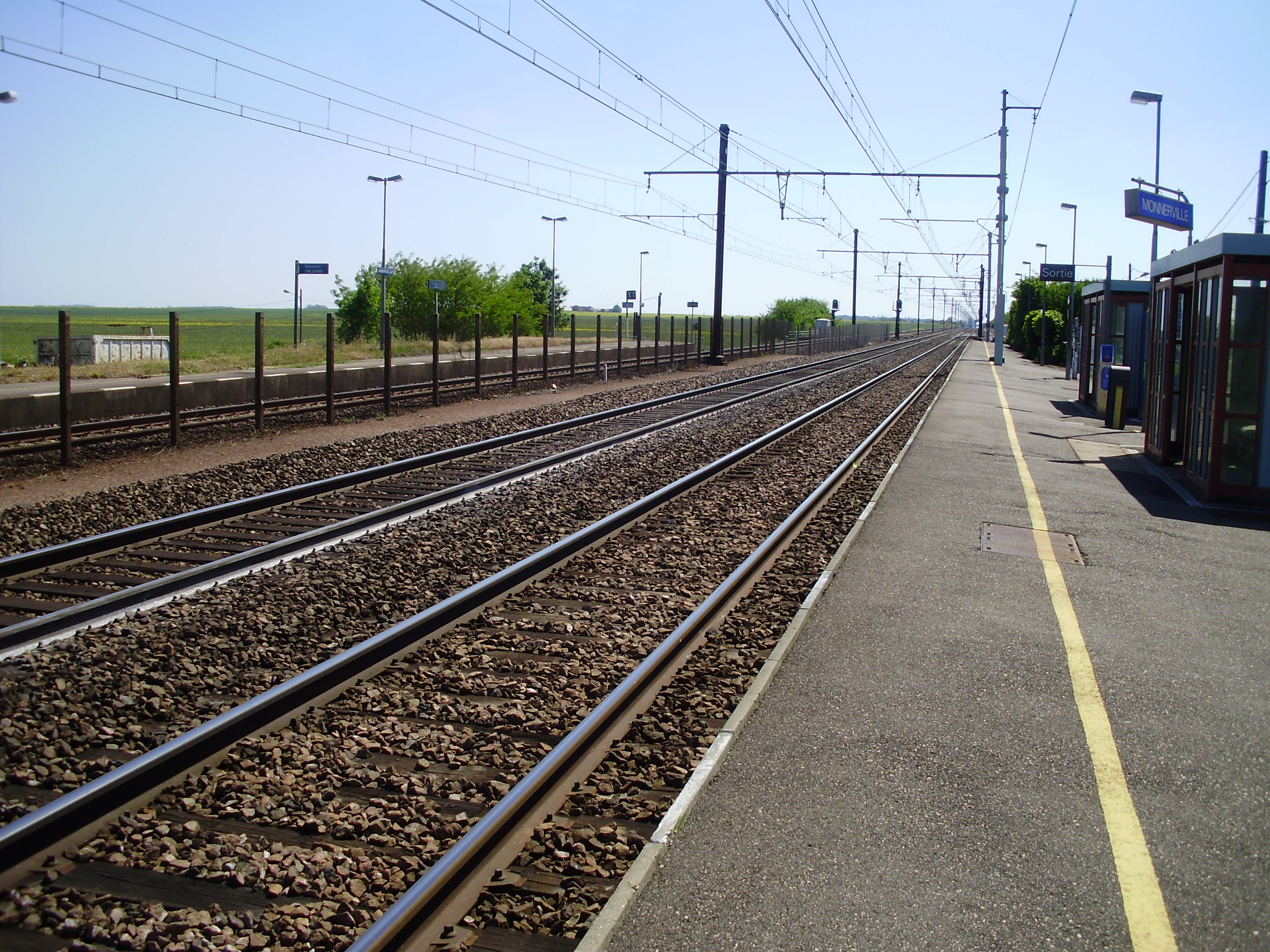
The station, looking towards Orléans

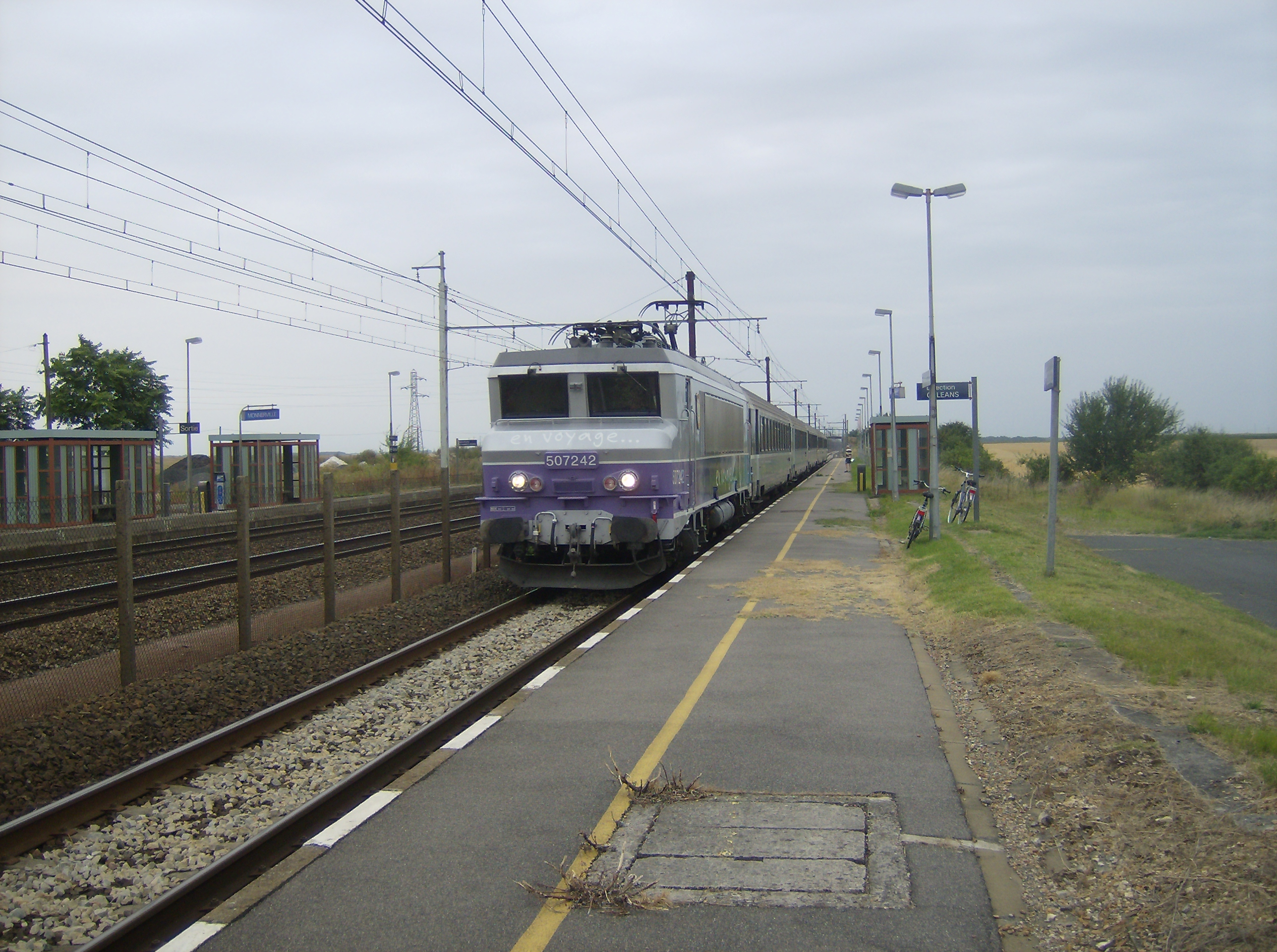
A train for Orléans at the station

Preceding station	Le Réseau Rémi	Following station
Angerville towards Orléans	1.1	Guillerval towards Paris-Austerlitz
