= Chevilly station =

Railway station in Chevilly, France

Coordinates: 48°01′33″N 1°52′42″E

Chevilly is a railway station in Chevilly, Centre-Val de Loire, France. The station was opened on 5 May 1843, and is located on the Paris–Bordeaux railway line. The station is served by regional trains (TER Centre-Val de Loire) to Orléans, Étampes and Paris. The station is served by about 6 trains per day in each direction.

| Preceding station | Le Réseau Rémi | Following station |
|---|---|---|
| Cercottes towards Orléans | 1.1 | Artenay towards Paris-Austerlitz |

== Gallery ==
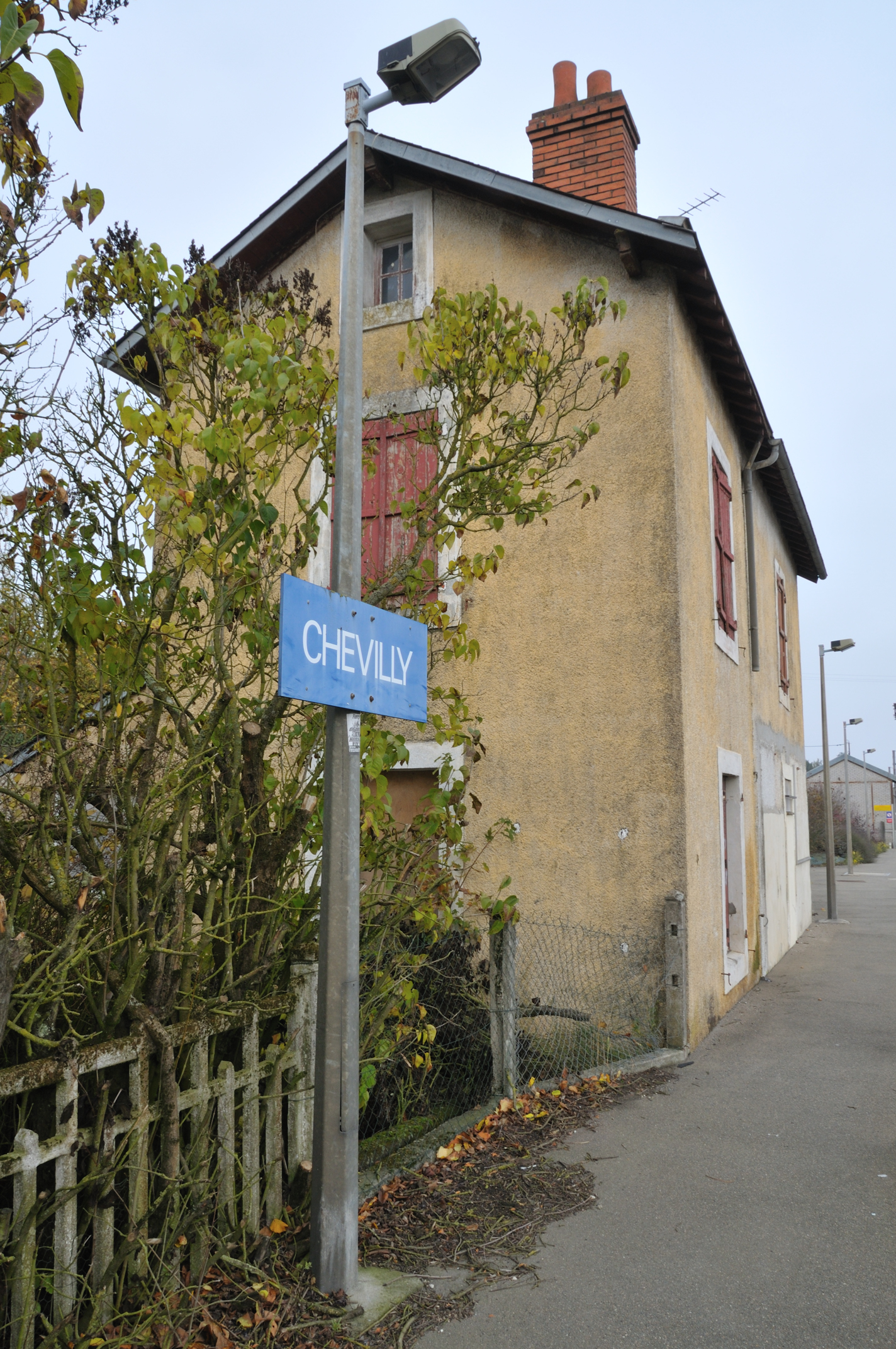
The station building

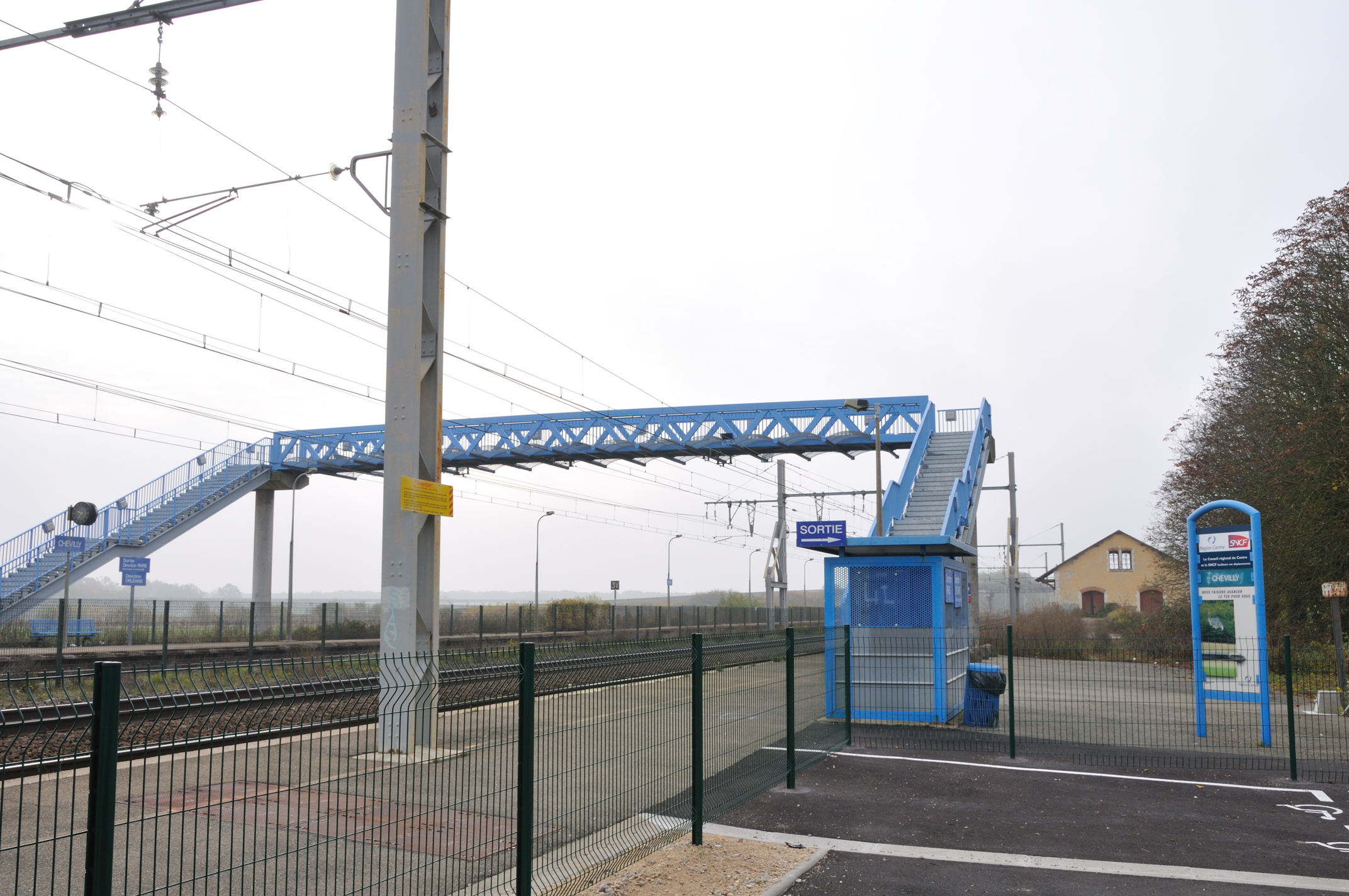
The station

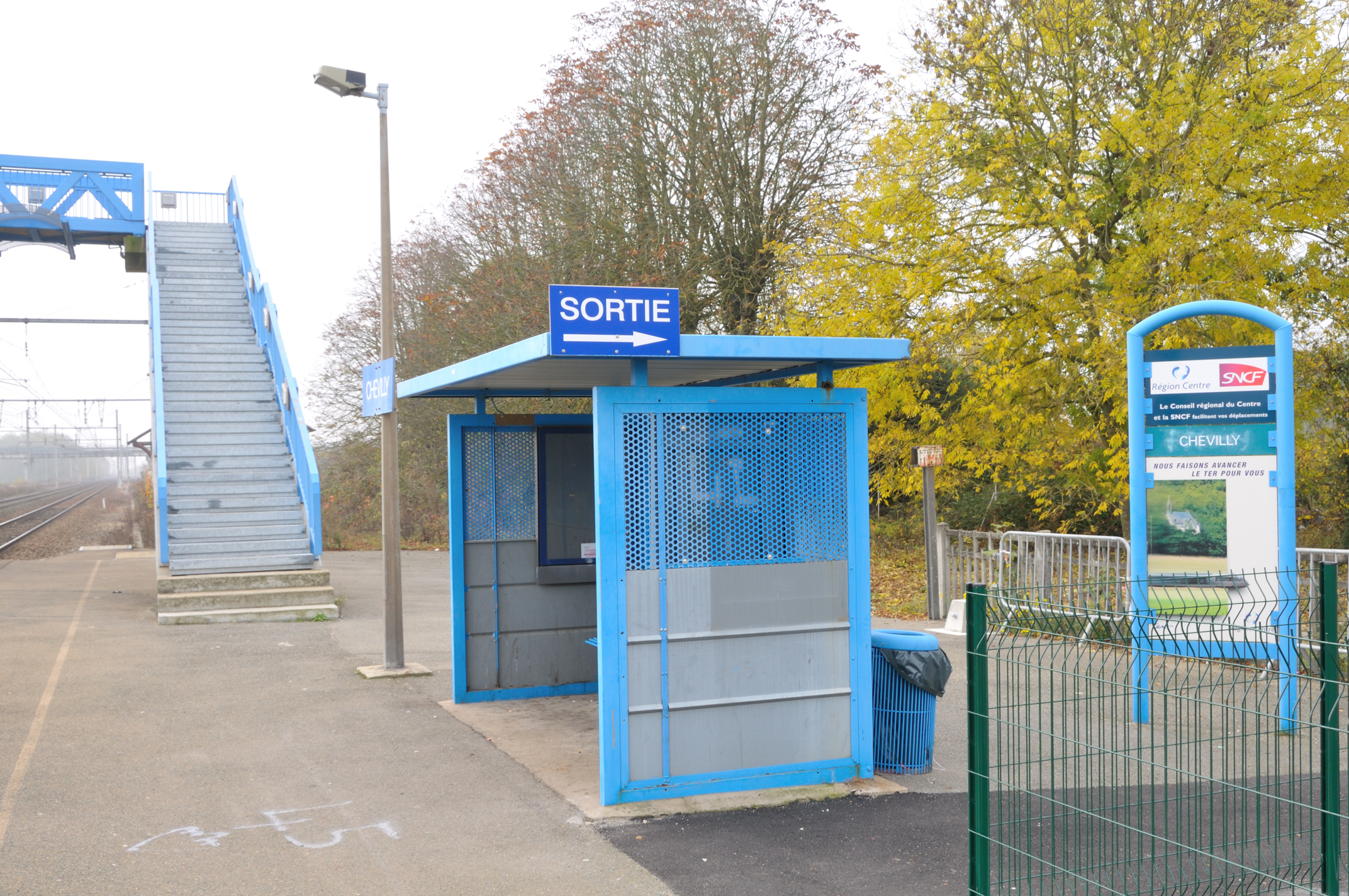
The station

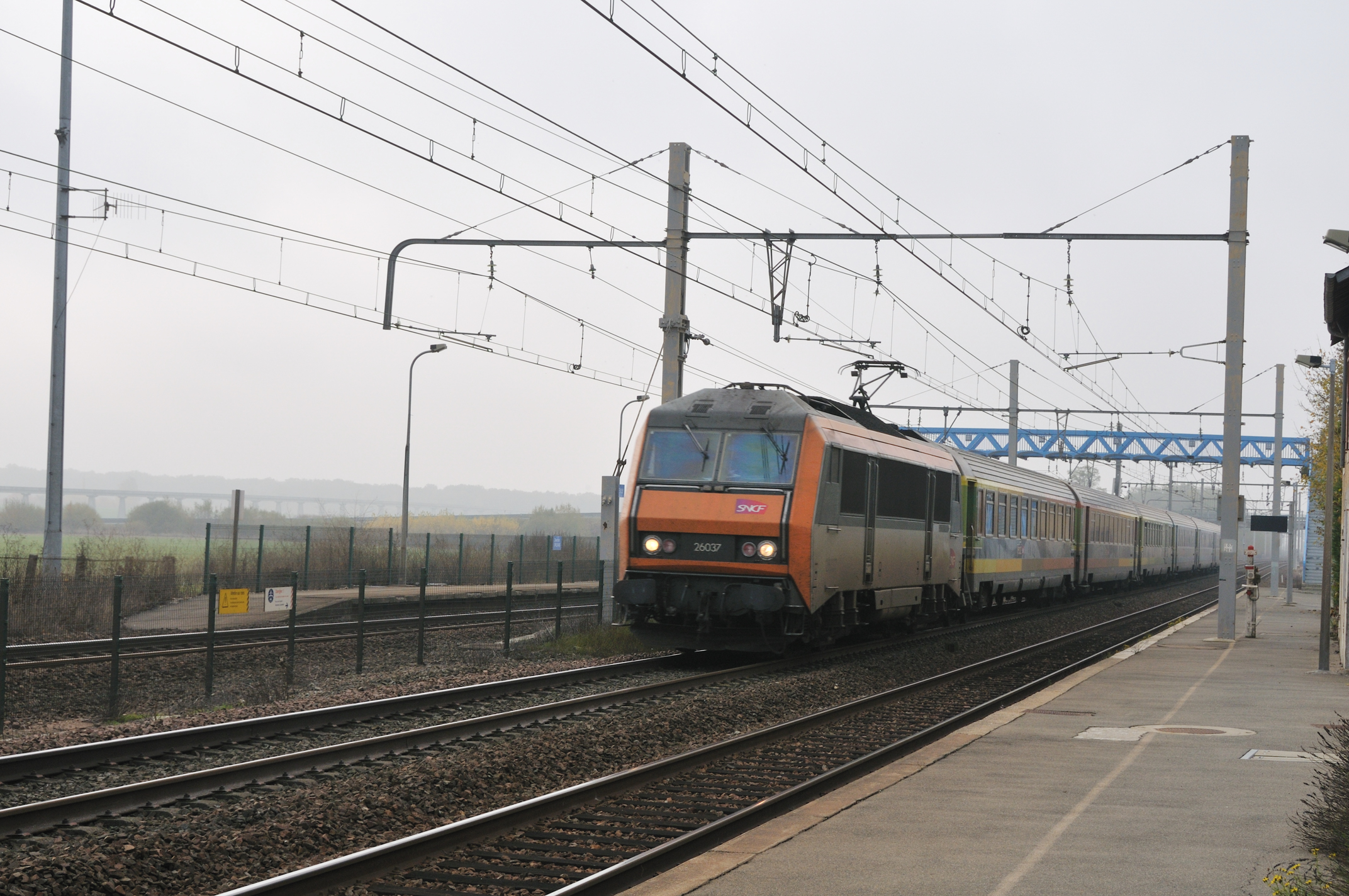
26037 passing through the station
