= Angerville station =

Railway station in Angerville, France

Coordinates: 48°18′41″N 2°00′14″E

Angerville
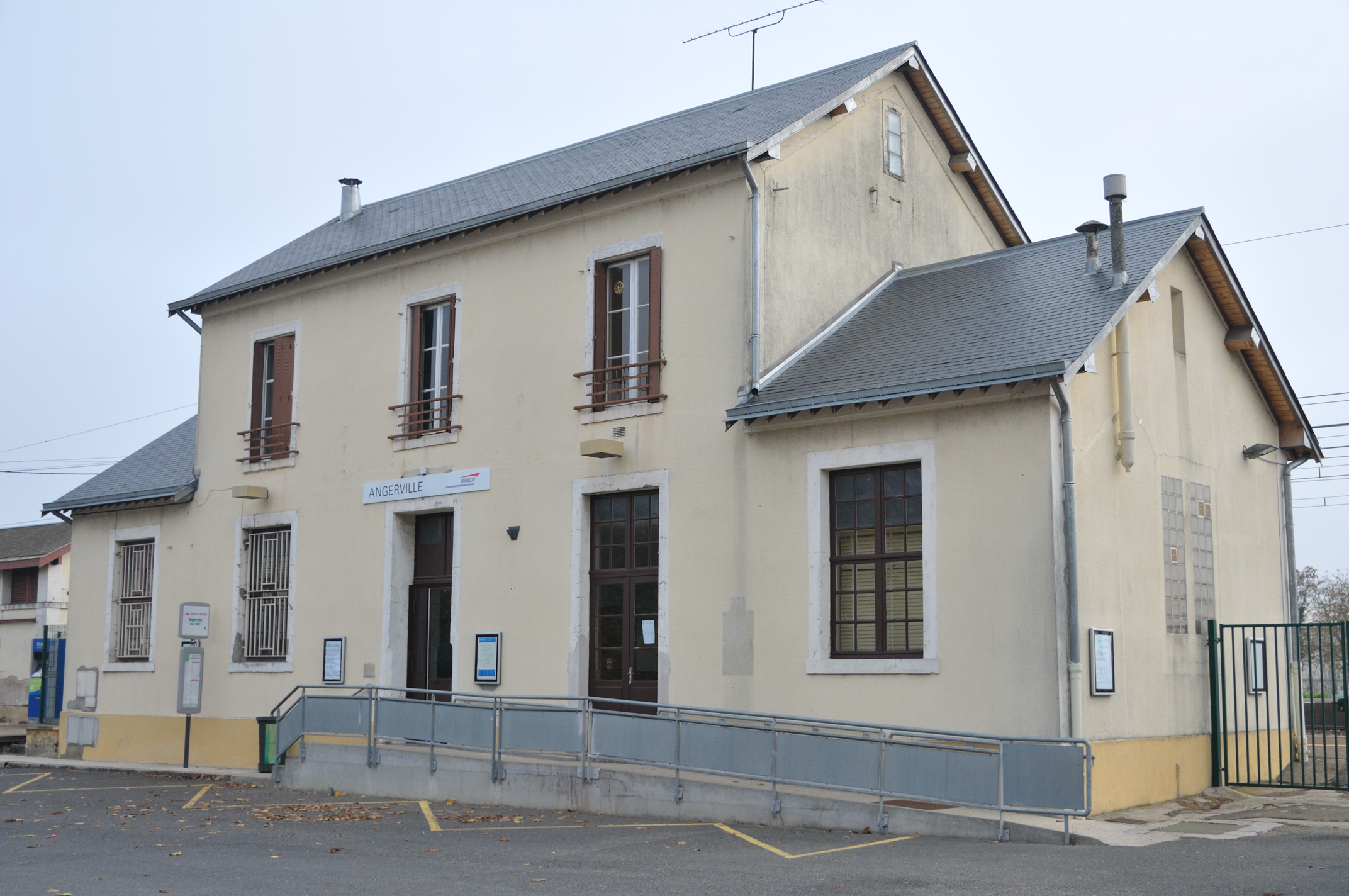
- Station building in 2009

General information
- Location: Place de la Gare; 91670 Angerville; Essonne, France
- Elevation: 141 m (463 ft)
- Line: Paris–Bordeaux railway
- Platforms: 2
- Tracks: 3 + service tracks

Other information
- Station code: 87543090
- Fare zone: 5

History
- Opened: 5 May 1843

Passengers
- 2020: 100,210

Services
Preceding station	Le Réseau Rémi	Following station
Boisseaux towards Orléans	1.1	Monnerville towards Paris-Austerlitz
Location

Angerville station (French: Gare d'Angerville) is a railway station in Angerville, Île de France, France. The station was opened on 5 May 1843, and is on the Paris–Bordeaux railway line, about 75 km outside Paris. The station is served by regional trains (TER Centre-Val de Loire) to Orléans, Étampes and Paris. The station is served by about 3 trains per day in each direction.

== Gallery ==
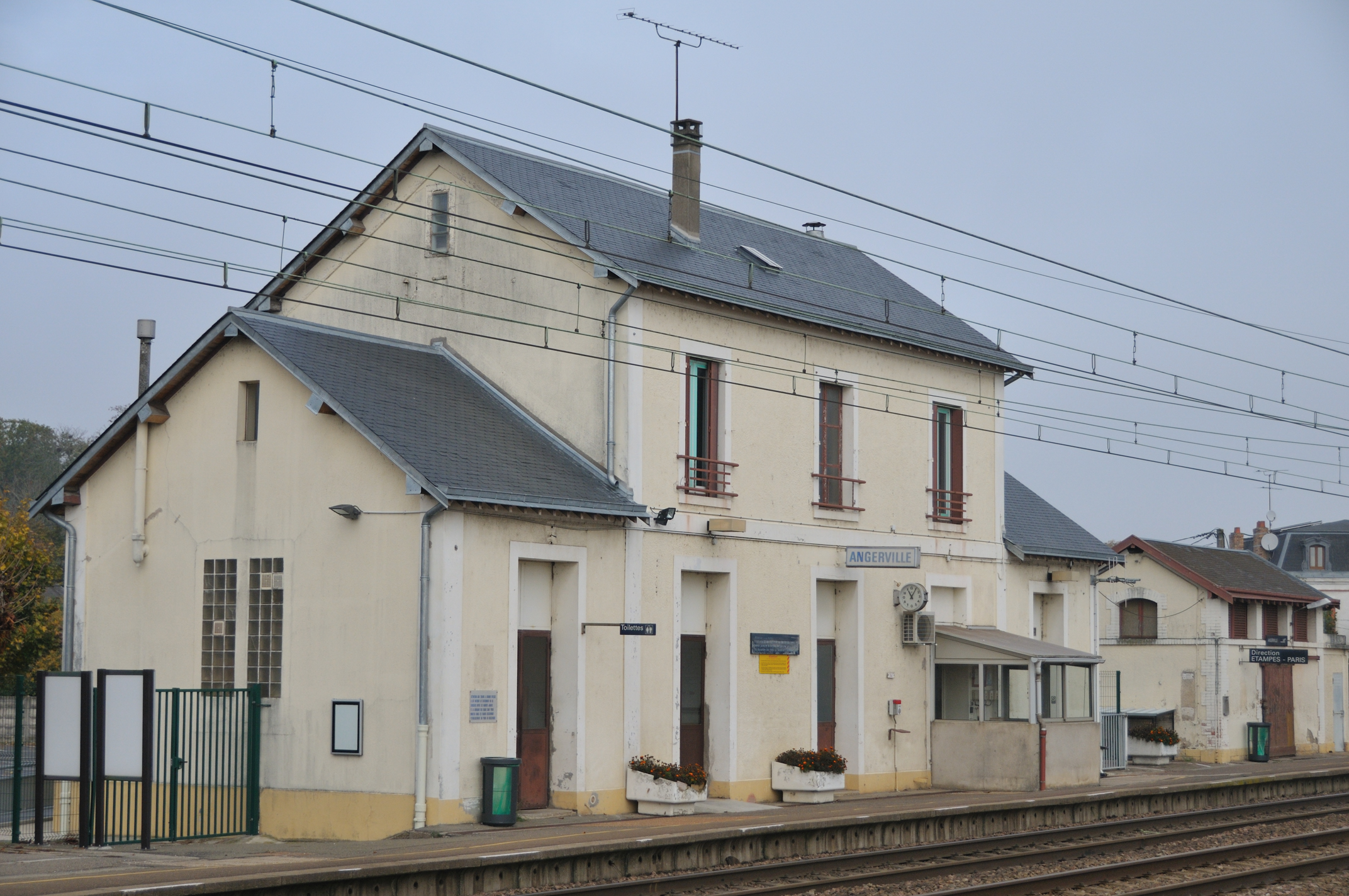
The Station building
