= Boisseaux station =

Railway station in Boisseaux, France

Coordinates: 48°15′23″N 1°58′24″E

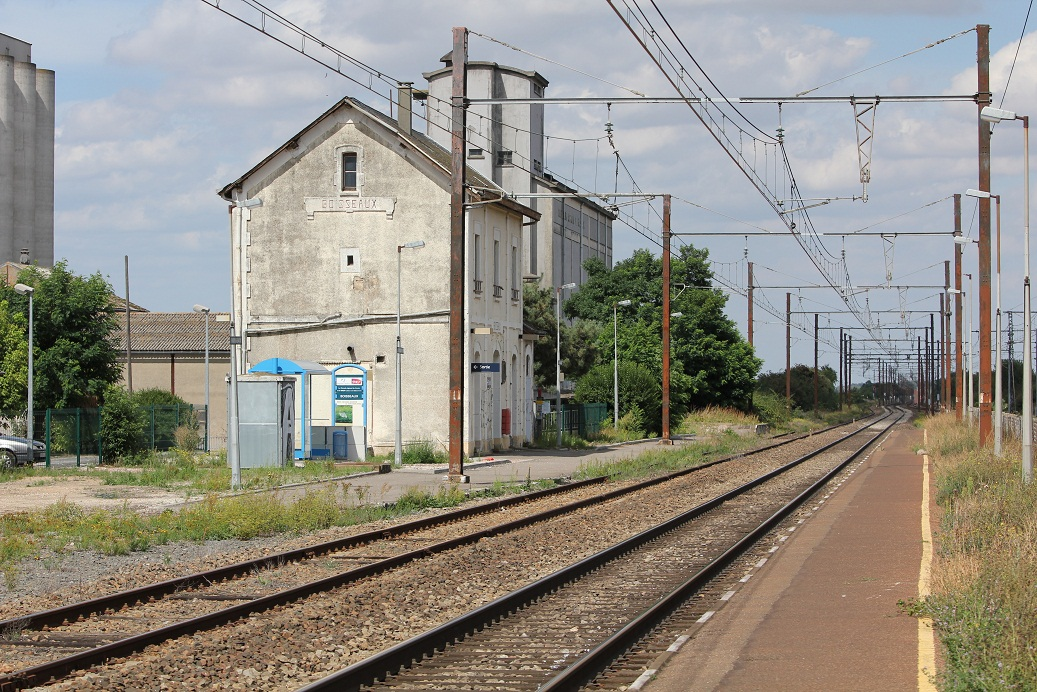
Boisseaux station

Boisseaux is a railway station in Boisseaux, Centre-Val de Loire, France. The station was opened on 5 May 1843, and is located on the Paris–Bordeaux railway line, about 80 km outside Paris.

The station is served by regional trains (TER Centre-Val de Loire) to Orléans, Étampes and Paris. The station is served by about 3 trains per day in each direction.

Preceding station	Le Réseau Rémi	Following station
Toury towards Orléans	1.1	Angerville towards Paris-Austerlitz
