= Artenay station =

Railway station in Artenay, France

Coordinates: 48°04′50″N 1°52′59″E

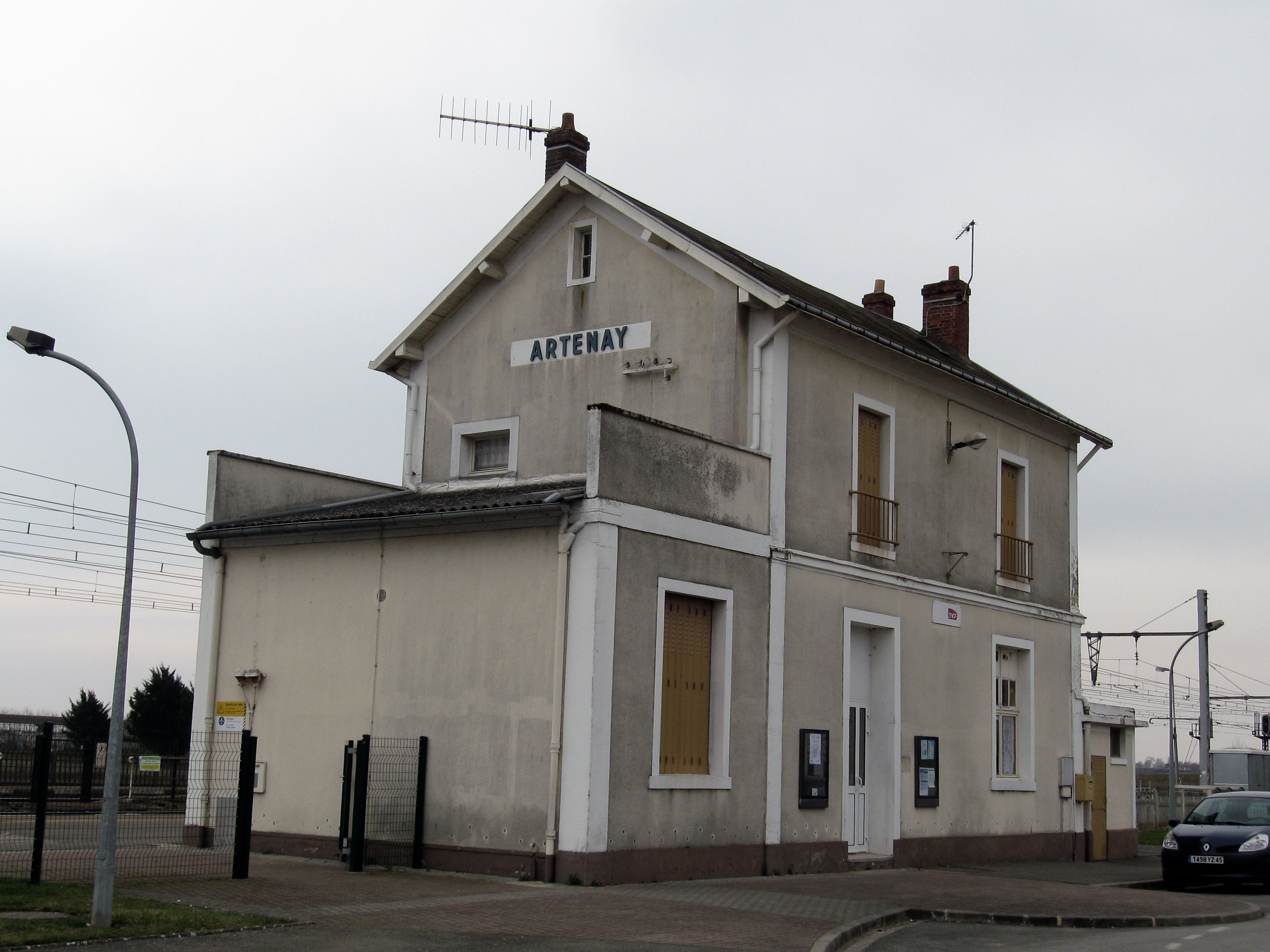
The train station

Artenay is a railway station in Artenay, Centre-Val de Loire, France. The station was opened on 5 May 1843, and is located on the Paris–Bordeaux railway line, about 100 km outside Paris. The station is served by TER (local) services operated by the SNCF.

== Train services ==
The station is served by regional trains (TER Centre-Val de Loire) to Orléans, Étampes and Paris. The station is served by about 6 trains per day in each direction.

Preceding station	Le Réseau Rémi	Following station
Chevilly towards Orléans	1.1	Château-Gaillard towards Paris-Austerlitz

== Gallery ==
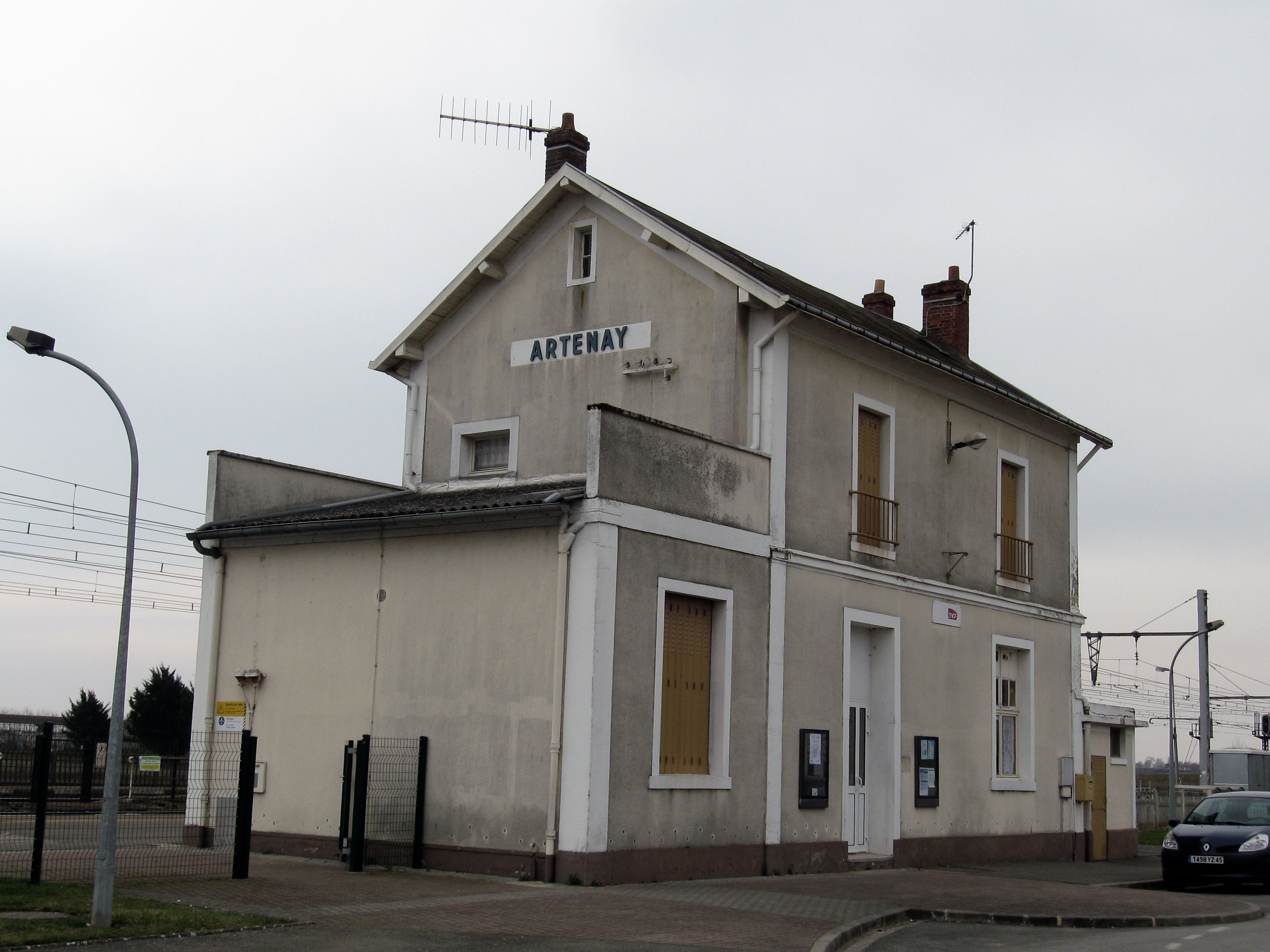
The station building

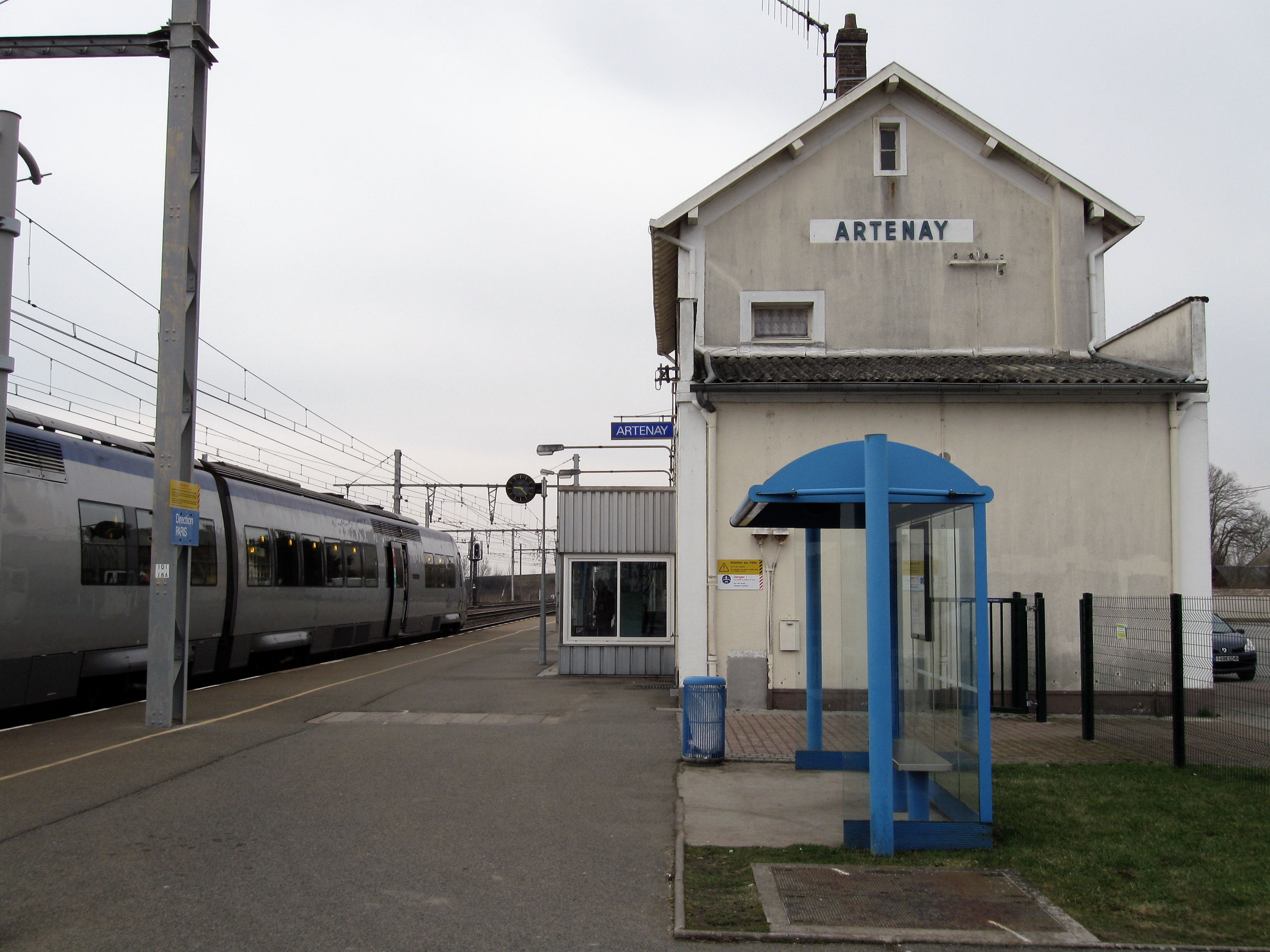
The station

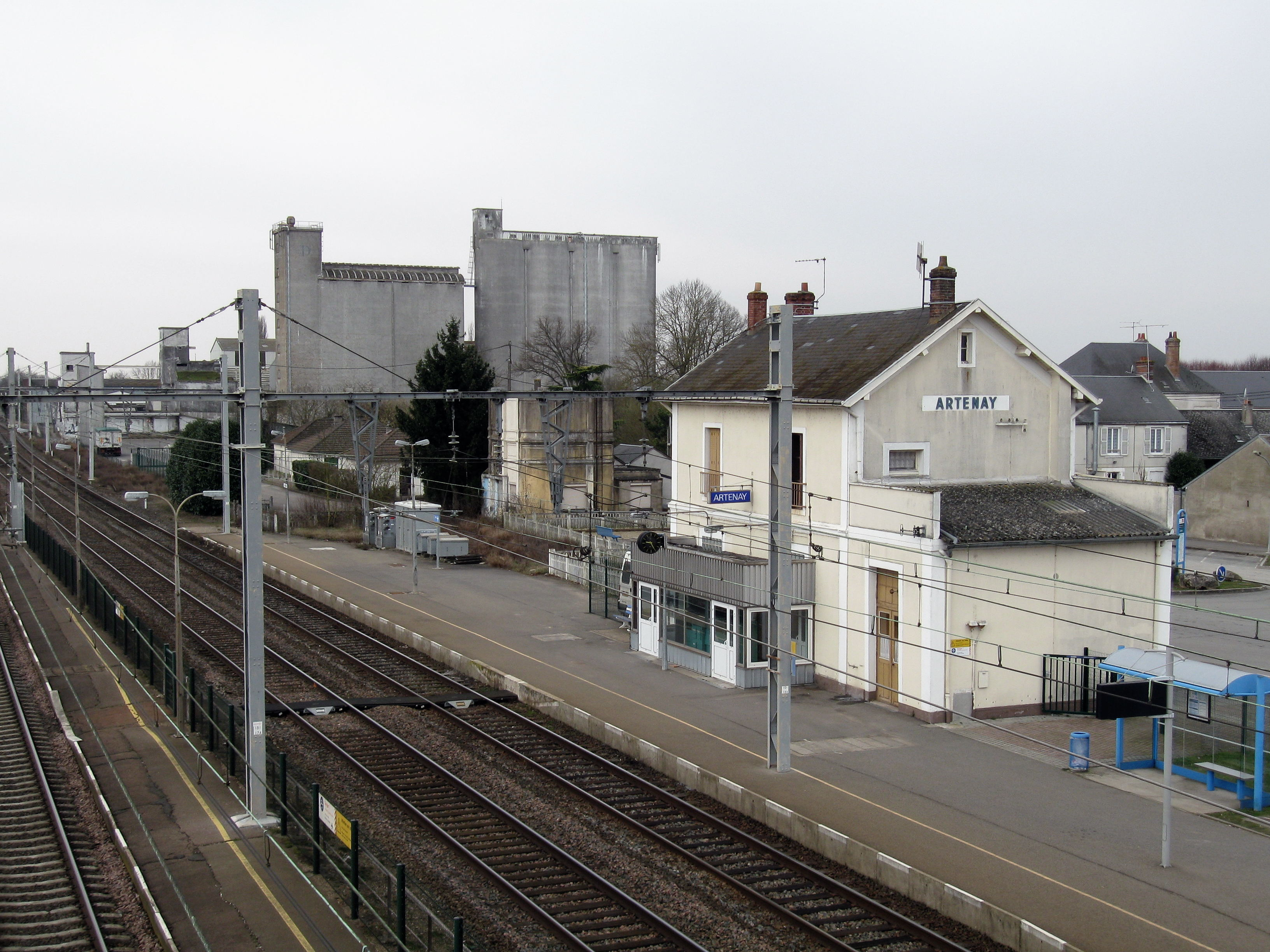
The station

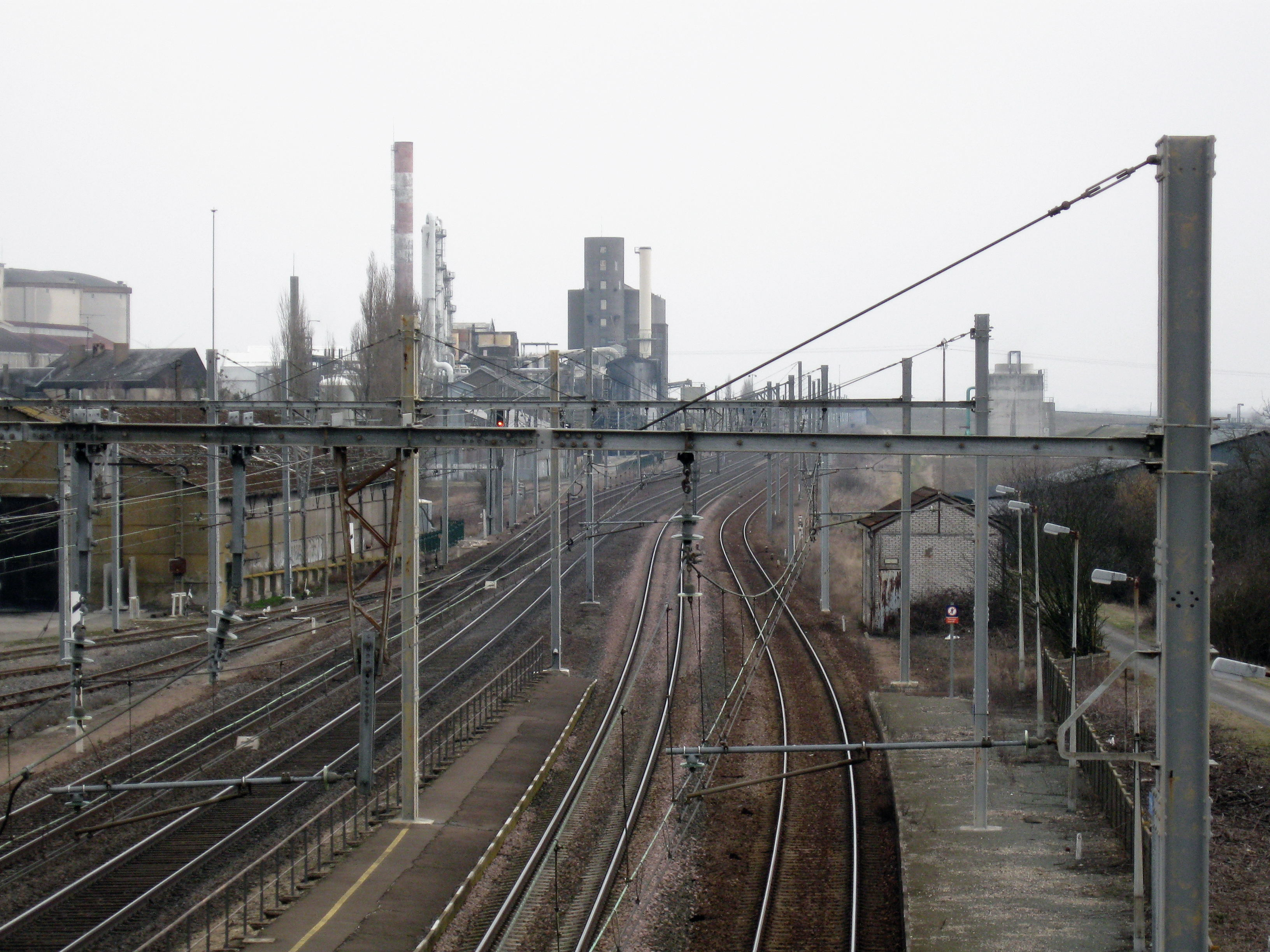
The station
