= 2008 European KF1 Championship =

Round	Circuit	Date	Pole	Winner
1 2	(France) Angerville	4 May	(Netherlands) Jack Te Braak (France) Arnaud Kozlinski	(France) Arnaud Kozlinski (United Kingdom) Gary Catt
3 4	(Belgium) Mariembourg	29 June	(France) Armand Convers (Italy) Marco Ardigò	(Italy) Marco Ardigò (Italy) Marco Ardigò
5 6	(Portugal) Braga	3 August	(Italy) Davide Fore (France) Arnaud Kozlinski	(France) Arnaud Kozlinski (France) Jean-Philippe Guignet

== See also ==
- European KF1 Championship
