= Chamarande station =

Railway station in Chamarande, France

Chamarande
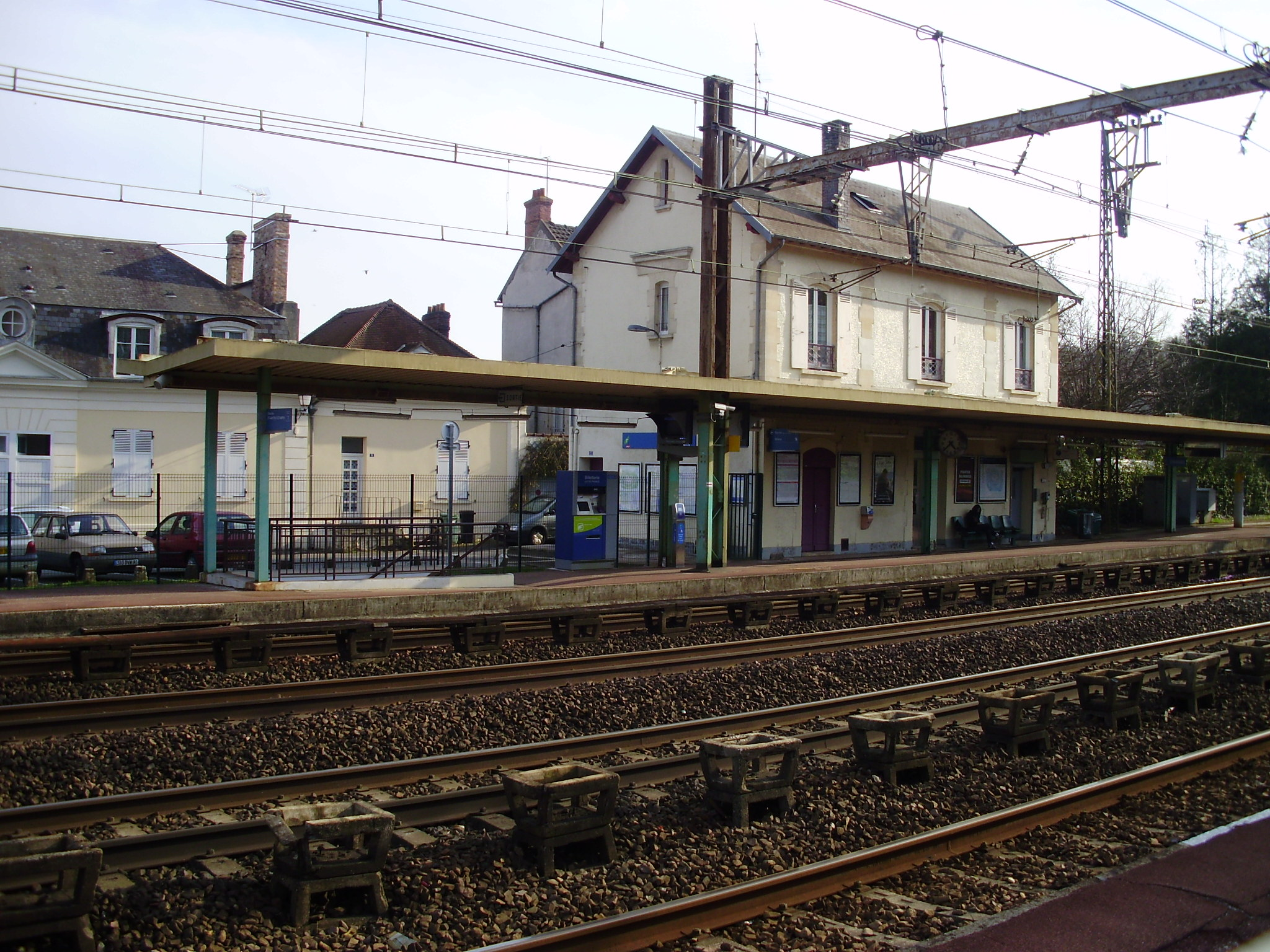
- Chamarande railway station

General information
- Location: Chamarande, Essonne, Île-de-France, France
- Coordinates: 48°30′51″N 2°12′57″E
- Line: Paris–Bordeaux railway
- Platforms: 2
- Tracks: 4

Other information
- Station code: 87545152
- Fare zone: 5

History
- Opened: 5 May 1843

Services
Preceding station	RER	Following station
Lardy towards Saint-Quentin-en-Yvelines	RER C	Étréchy towards Saint-Martin-d'Étampes
Location

Chamarande is a railway station in Chamarande, Essonne, Paris, France. The station was opened in 1843 and is on the Paris–Bordeaux railway. The station is served by Paris' express suburban rail system, the RER. The train services are operated by SNCF.

== Train services ==
The following services serve the station:

- Local services (RER C) Saint-Martin d'Étampes, Juvisy–Paris–Issy–Versailles-Chantiers, Saint-Quentin-en-Yvelines, Chaville–Vélizy

== See also ==
- List of stations of the Paris RER
