= Étréchy station =

Railway station in Étréchy, France

Étréchy
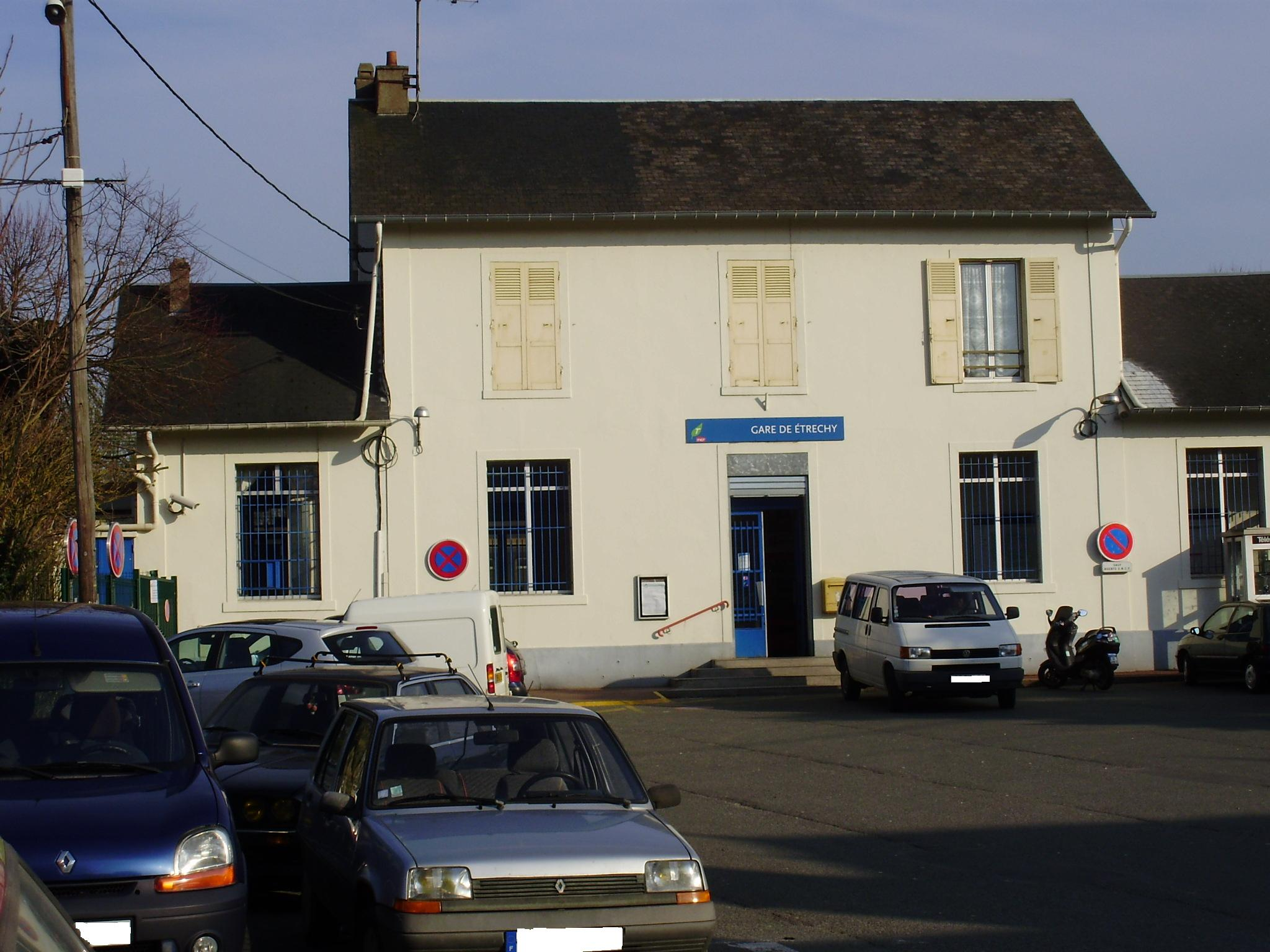
- Étréchy railway station

General information
- Location: Étréchy, Essonne, Île-de-France, France
- Coordinates: 48°29′37″N 2°11′40″E
- Line: Paris–Bordeaux railway
- Platforms: 2
- Tracks: 4

Other information
- Station code: 87545145
- Fare zone: 5

History
- Opened: 5 May 1843

Services
Preceding station	RER	Following station
Chamarande towards Saint-Quentin-en-Yvelines	RER C	Étampes towards Saint-Martin-d'Étampes
Location

Étréchy is a railway station in Étréchy, Essonne, Paris, France. The station was opened in 1843 and is on the Paris–Bordeaux railway. The station is served by Paris's express suburban rail system, the RER. The train services are operated by SNCF.

== Train services ==
The following services serve the station:

- Local services (RER C) Saint-Martin d'Étampes – Juvisy – Paris – Issy – Versailles-Chantiers – Saint-Quentin-en-Yvelines

== See also ==
- List of stations of the Paris RER
