= Guillerval station =

Railway station in Guillerval, France

Coordinates: 48°22′28″N 2°03′36″E

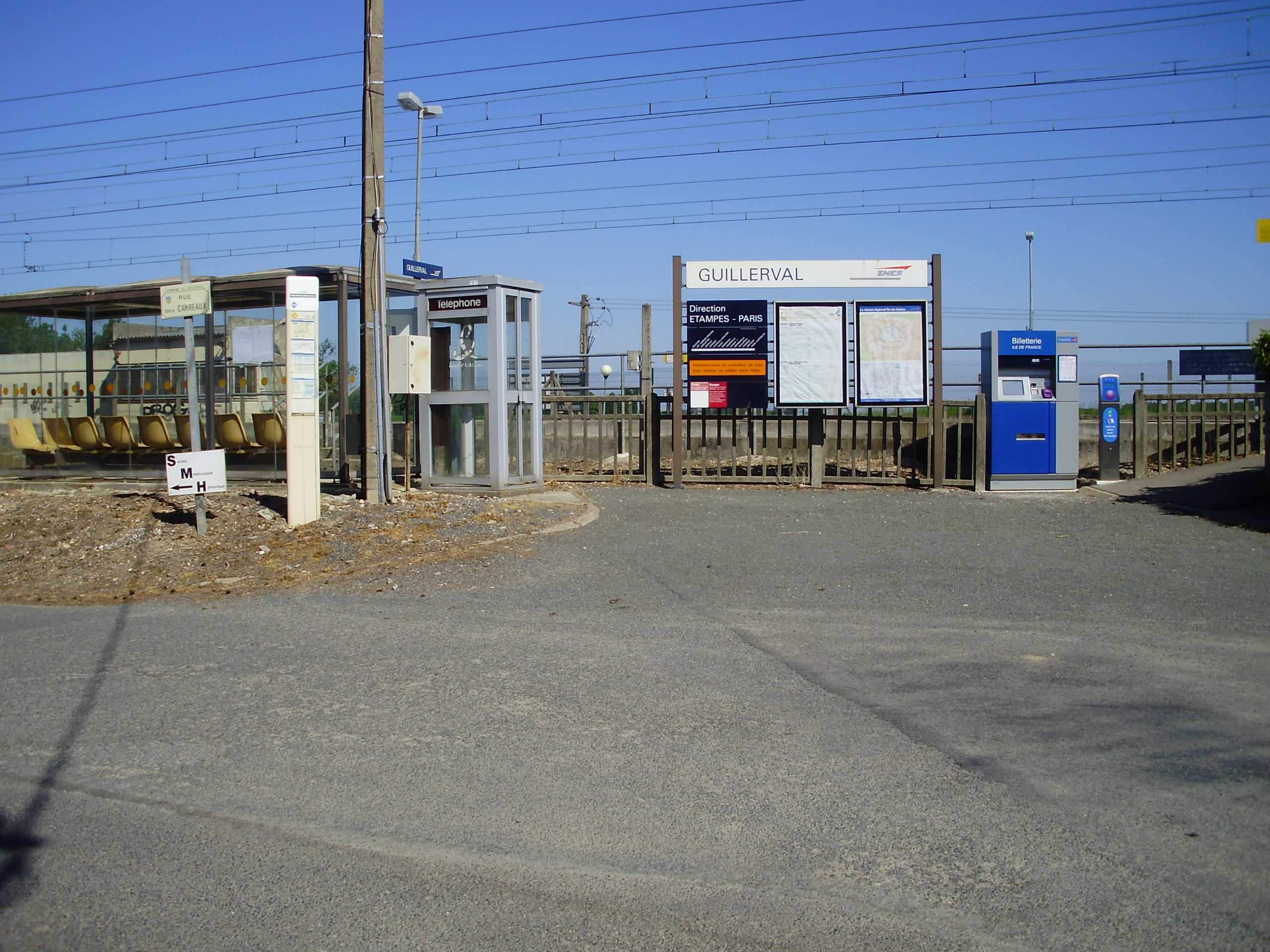
Guillerval station

Guillerval is a railway station 3 km west of Guillerval, Île de France, France. The station is on the Paris–Bordeaux railway line. The station is served by regional trains (TER Centre-Val de Loire) to Orléans, Étampes and Paris.

Preceding station	Le Réseau Rémi	Following station
Monnerville towards Orléans	1.1	Étampes towards Paris-Austerlitz

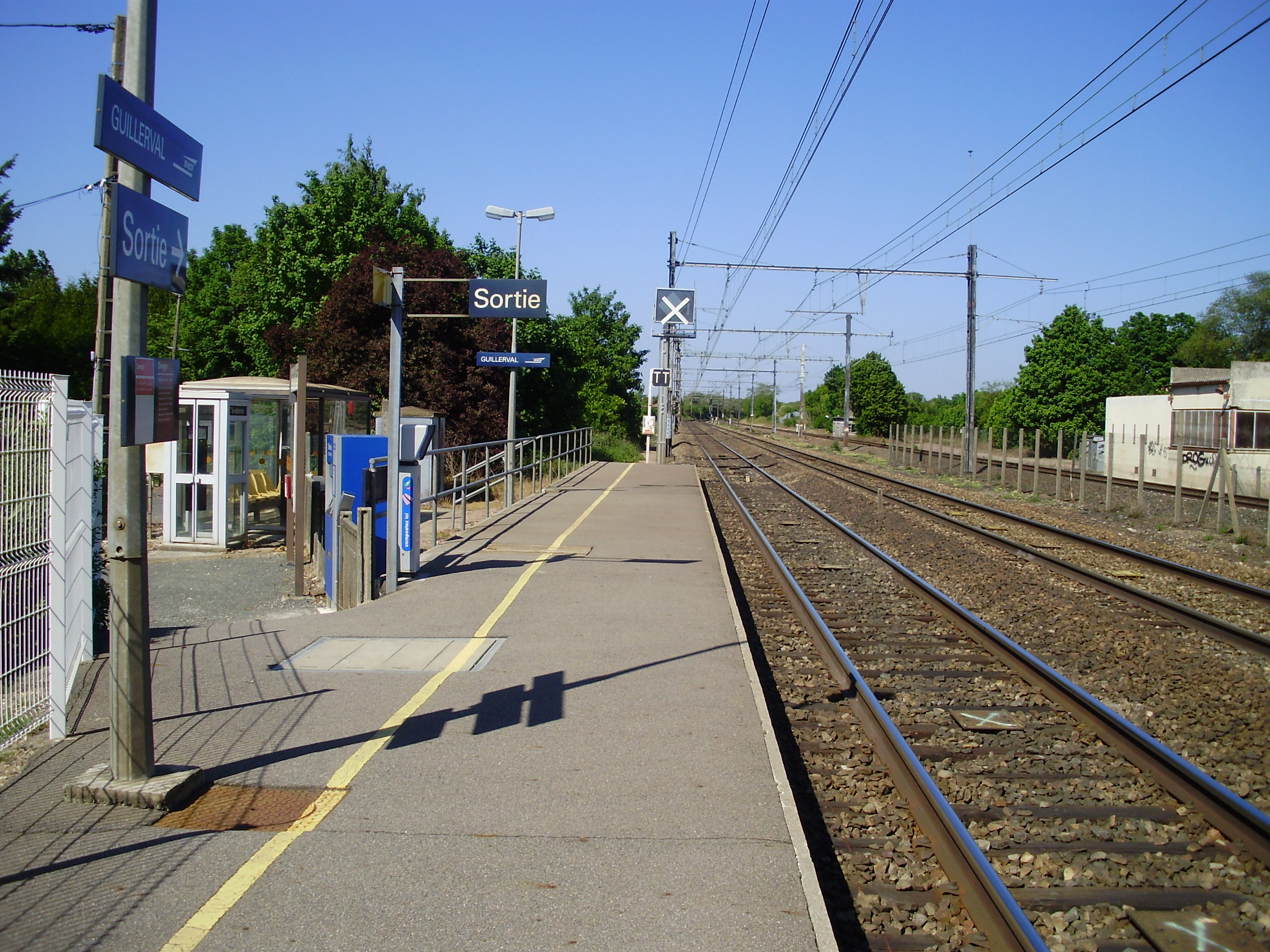
The station, Orleans platform

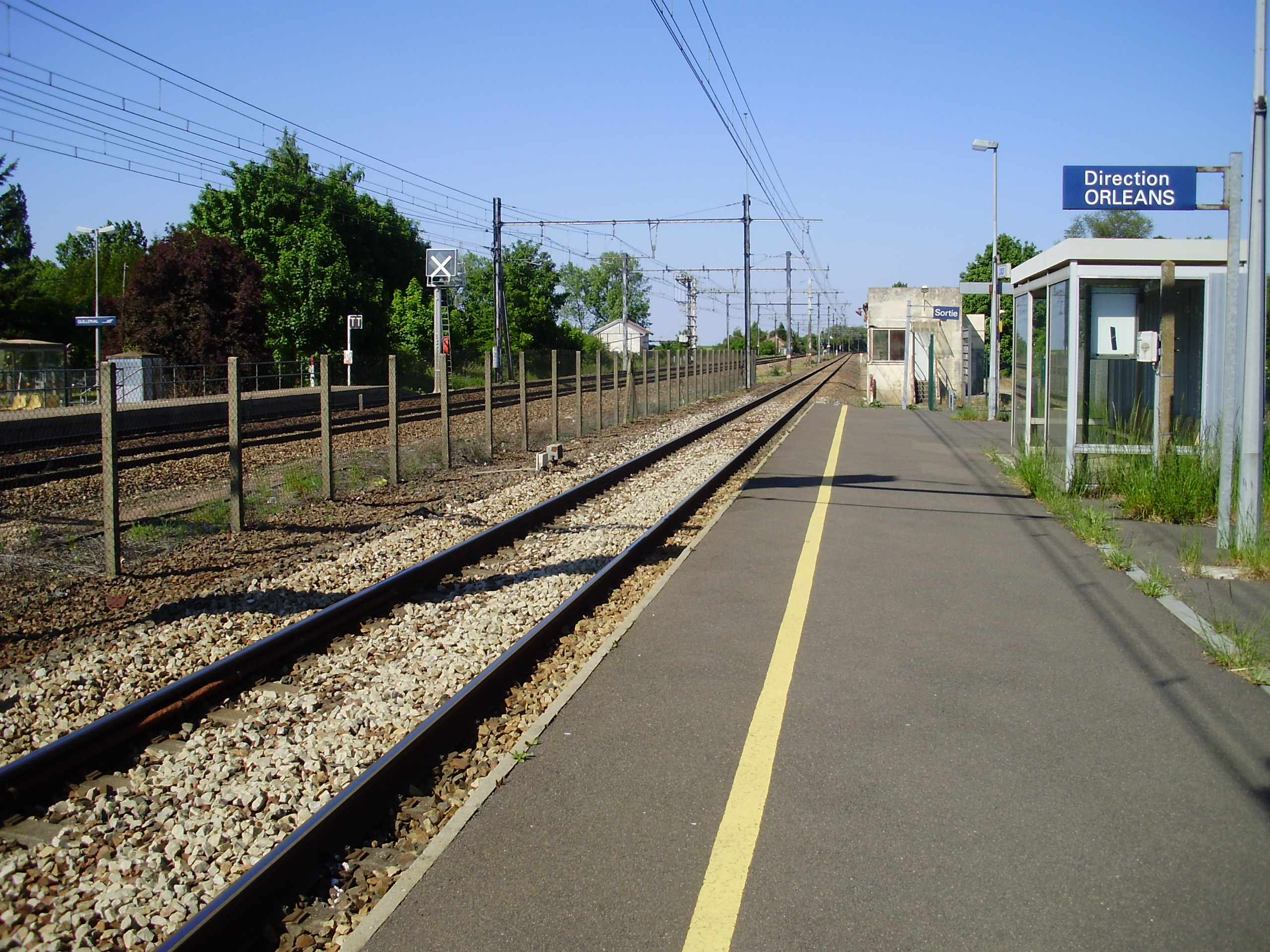
The station, looking towards Paris.
