= Chamarande =

Commune in Île-de-France, France

- Commune
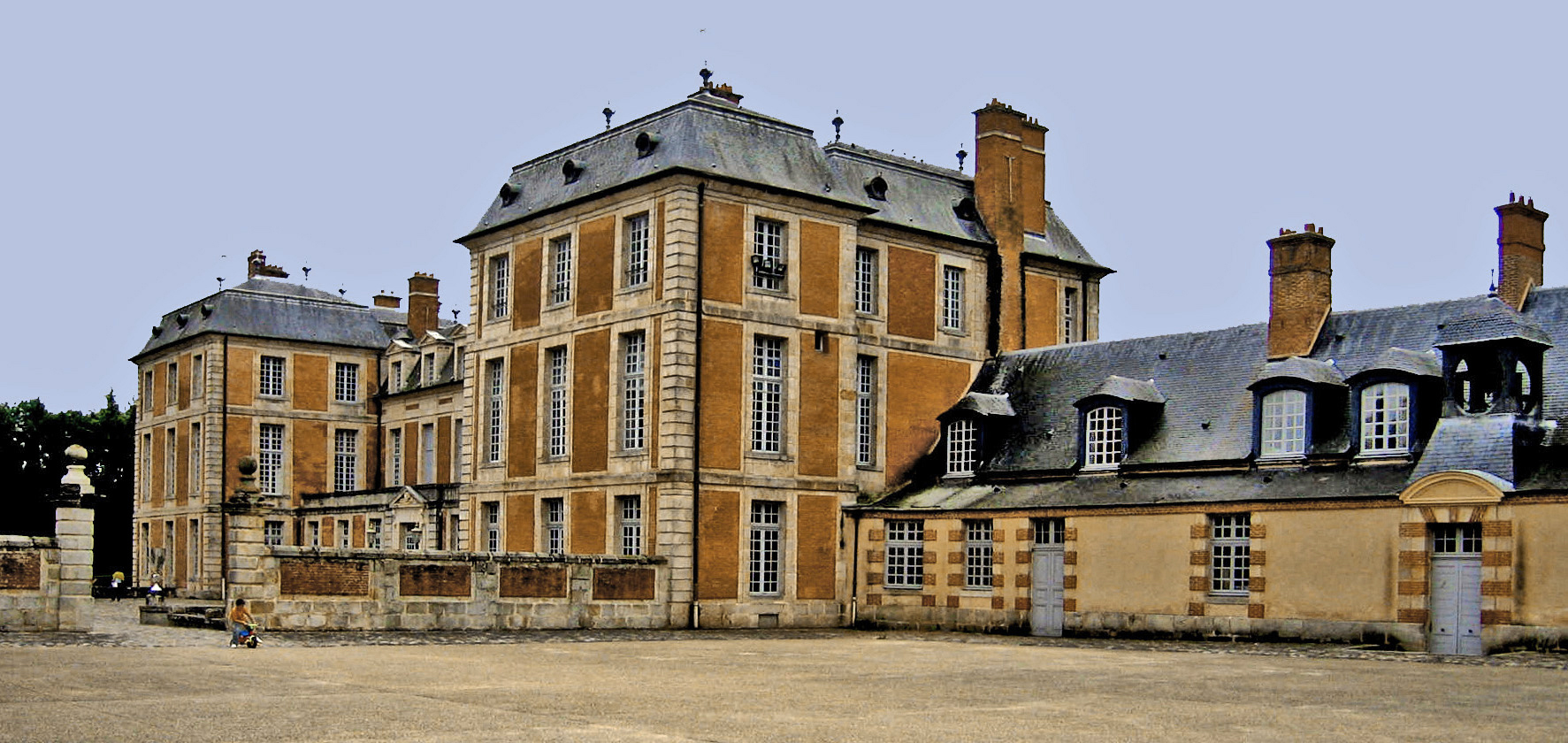
- The château of Chamarande
- Location of Chamarande
- Location within France Location within Île-de-France (region)
- Coordinates: 48°30′48″N 2°13′03″E
- Country: France
- Region: Île-de-France
- Department: Essonne
- Arrondissement: Étampes
- Canton: Dourdan
- Intercommunality: Entre Juine et Renarde

Government
  - Mayor (2020–2026): Patrick De Luca
- Area^{1}: 5.74 km^{2} (2.22 sq mi)
- Highest elevation: 155 m (509 ft)
- Lowest elevation: 62 m (203 ft)
- Population (2023): 1,089
  - Density: 190/km^{2} (491/sq mi)
- Time zone: UTC+01:00 (CET)
  - Summer (DST): UTC+02:00 (CEST)
- INSEE/Postal code: 91132 /91730
- ^{1} French Land Register data, which excludes lakes, ponds, glaciers > 1 km^{2} (0.386 sq mi or 247 acres) and river estuaries.

Chamarande (French pronunciation: [ʃamaʁɑ̃d]) is a commune of Essonne department in the southern suburbs of Paris.

Inhabitants of Chamarande are known as Chamarandais.

== History ==
Initially, this village was named Bonnes. In 1685, d'Ornaison family, the owner of the village and its château, gained permission from the French king to change the name to Chamarande. A later owner, the Duc de Persigny, was Minister of the Interior under Napoléon III and a financial backer of the building of the Paris-Orléans rail station in the village, today an RER C station.

== Geography ==
The Juine forms the commune's eastern border.

== See also ==
- Communes of the Essonne department
