= Guillerval =

Commune in Île-de-France, France

- Commune
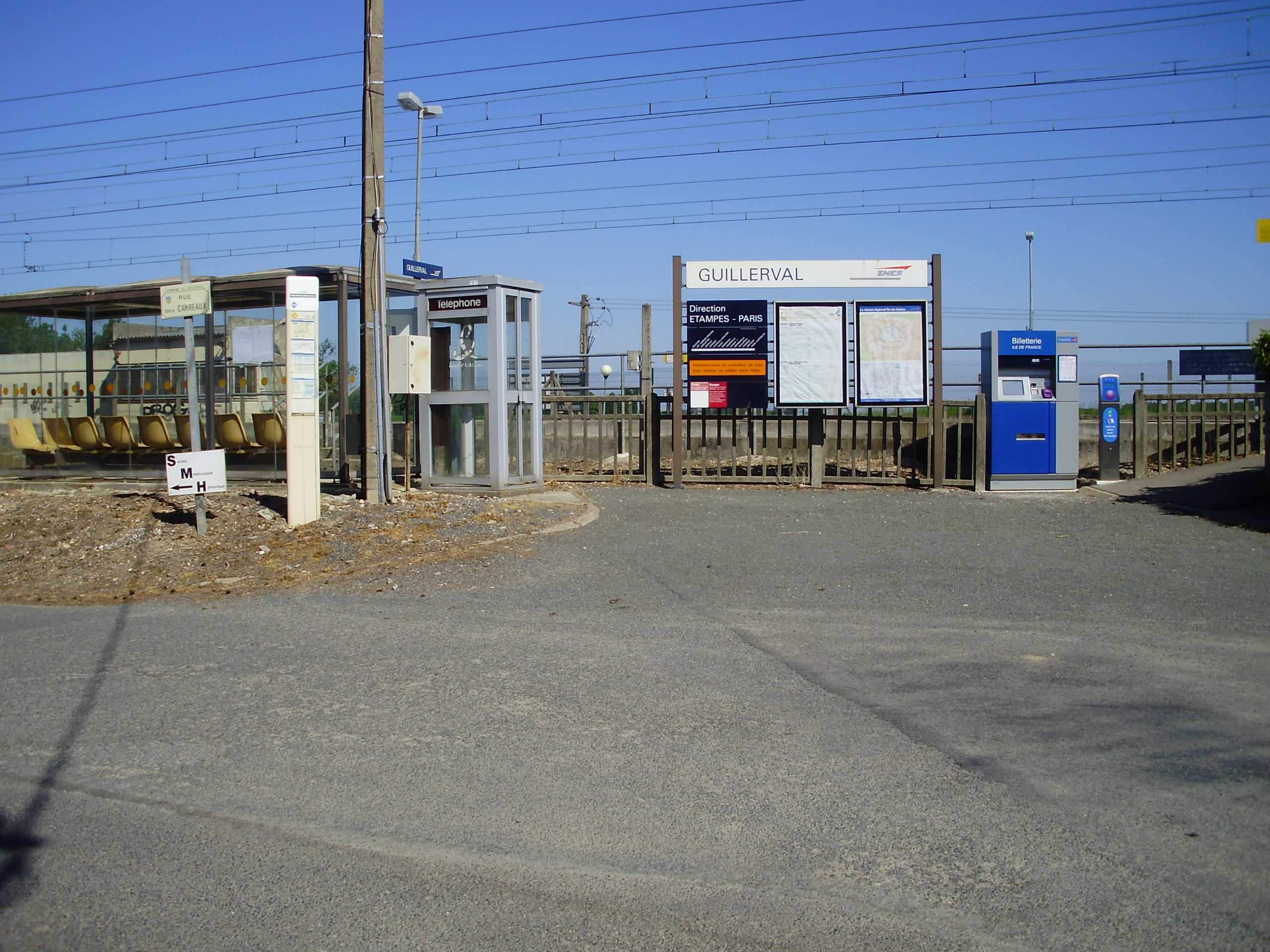
- The Gare de Guillerval

- Coat of arms
- Location of Guillerval
- Location within France Location within Île-de-France (region)
- Coordinates: 48°21′52″N 2°06′08″E
- Country: France
- Region: Île-de-France
- Department: Essonne
- Arrondissement: Étampes
- Canton: Étampes
- Intercommunality: CA Étampois Sud Essonne

Government
  - Mayor (2020–2026): Daniel Ciret
- Area^{1}: 17.30 km^{2} (6.68 sq mi)
- Highest elevation: 151 m (495 ft)
- Lowest elevation: 80 m (260 ft)
- Population (2023): 808
  - Density: 46.7/km^{2} (121/sq mi)
- Time zone: UTC+01:00 (CET)
  - Summer (DST): UTC+02:00 (CEST)
- INSEE/Postal code: 91294 /91690
- ^{1} French Land Register data, which excludes lakes, ponds, glaciers > 1 km^{2} (0.386 sq mi or 247 acres) and river estuaries.

Guillerval (French pronunciation: [ɡilɛʁval]) is a commune in the Essonne department in Île-de-France in northern France. Guillerval station has rail connections to Orléans, Étampes and Paris.

Inhabitants of Guillerval are known as Guillervallois.

== See also ==
- Communes of the Essonne department
