= Toury =

- Commune
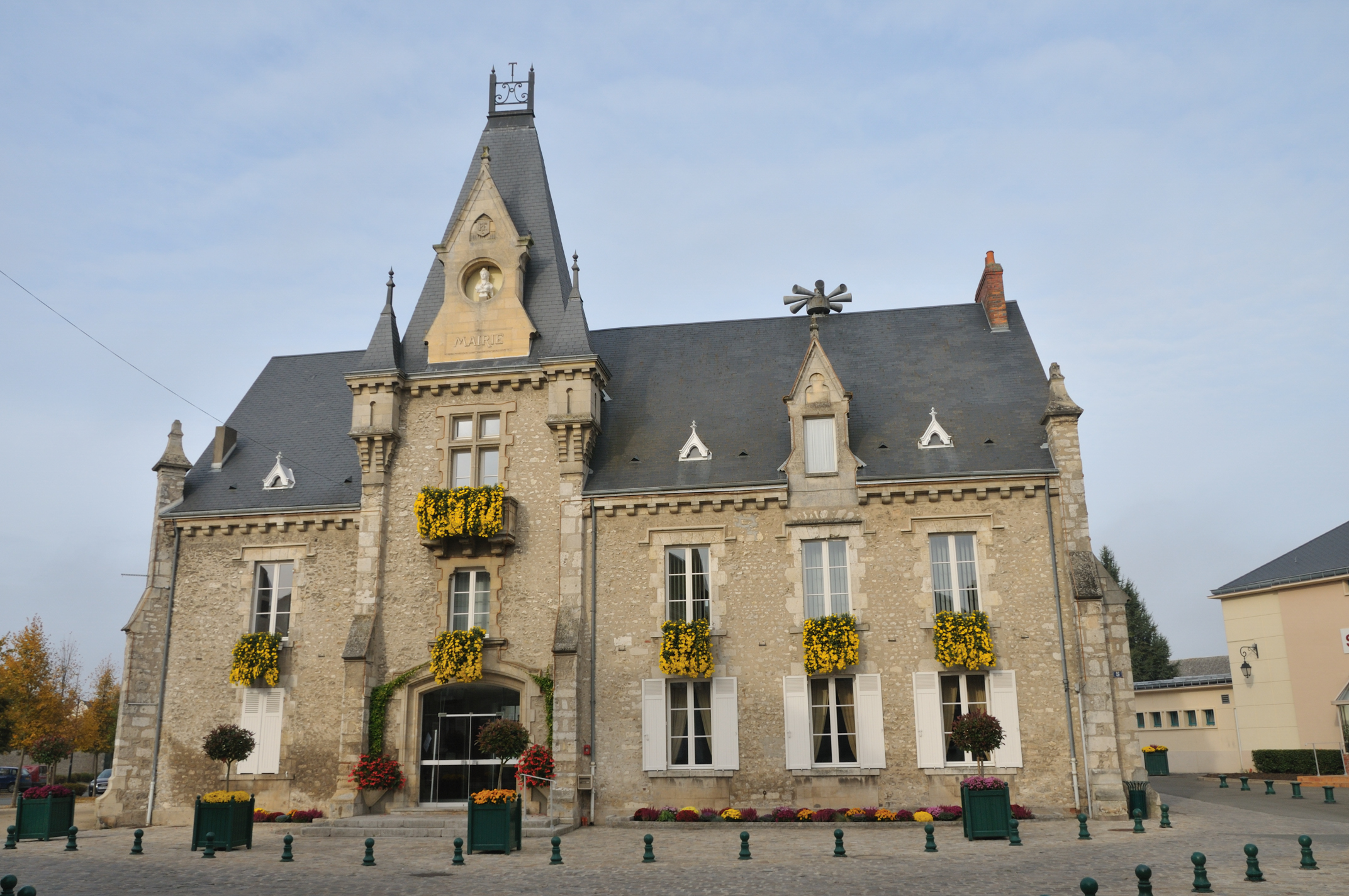
- Town hall

- Coat of arms
- Location of Toury
- Location within France Location within Centre-Val de Loire
- Coordinates: 48°11′41″N 1°56′11″E
- Country: France
- Region: Centre-Val de Loire
- Department: Eure-et-Loir
- Arrondissement: Chartres
- Canton: Les Villages Vovéens

Government
  - Mayor (2024–2026): Laurent Leclercq
- Area^{1}: 18.72 km^{2} (7.23 sq mi)
- Elevation: 134 m (440 ft)
- Highest elevation: 137 m (449 ft)
- Lowest elevation: 125 m (410 ft)
- Population (2023): 2,640
  - Density: 141/km^{2} (365/sq mi)
- Time zone: UTC+01:00 (CET)
  - Summer (DST): UTC+02:00 (CEST)
- INSEE/Postal code: 28391 /28310
- ^{1} French Land Register data, which excludes lakes, ponds, glaciers > 1 km^{2} (0.386 sq mi or 247 acres) and river estuaries.

Toury (French pronunciation: [tuʁi]) is a commune in the Eure-et-Loir department in northern France. Toury station has rail connections to Orléans, Étampes and Paris.

== Population ==
Historical population
Year	Pop.	±% p.a.
1968	2,243	—
1975	2,495	+1.53%
1982	2,493	−0.01%
1990	2,640	+0.72%
1999	2,666	+0.11%
2007	2,595	−0.34%
2012	2,670	+0.57%
2017	2,573	−0.74%
2023	2,640	+0.43%
Source: INSEE

== History ==
On 31 October 1908 Louis Blériot succeeded in making a cross-country flight, making a round trip from Toury to Artenay and back, a total distance of 28 km (17 mi). This was not the first cross-country flight by a narrow margin, since Henri Farman had flown from Bouy to Rheims, the preceding day.

== See also ==
- Communes of the Eure-et-Loir department
