= Boisseaux =

- Commune
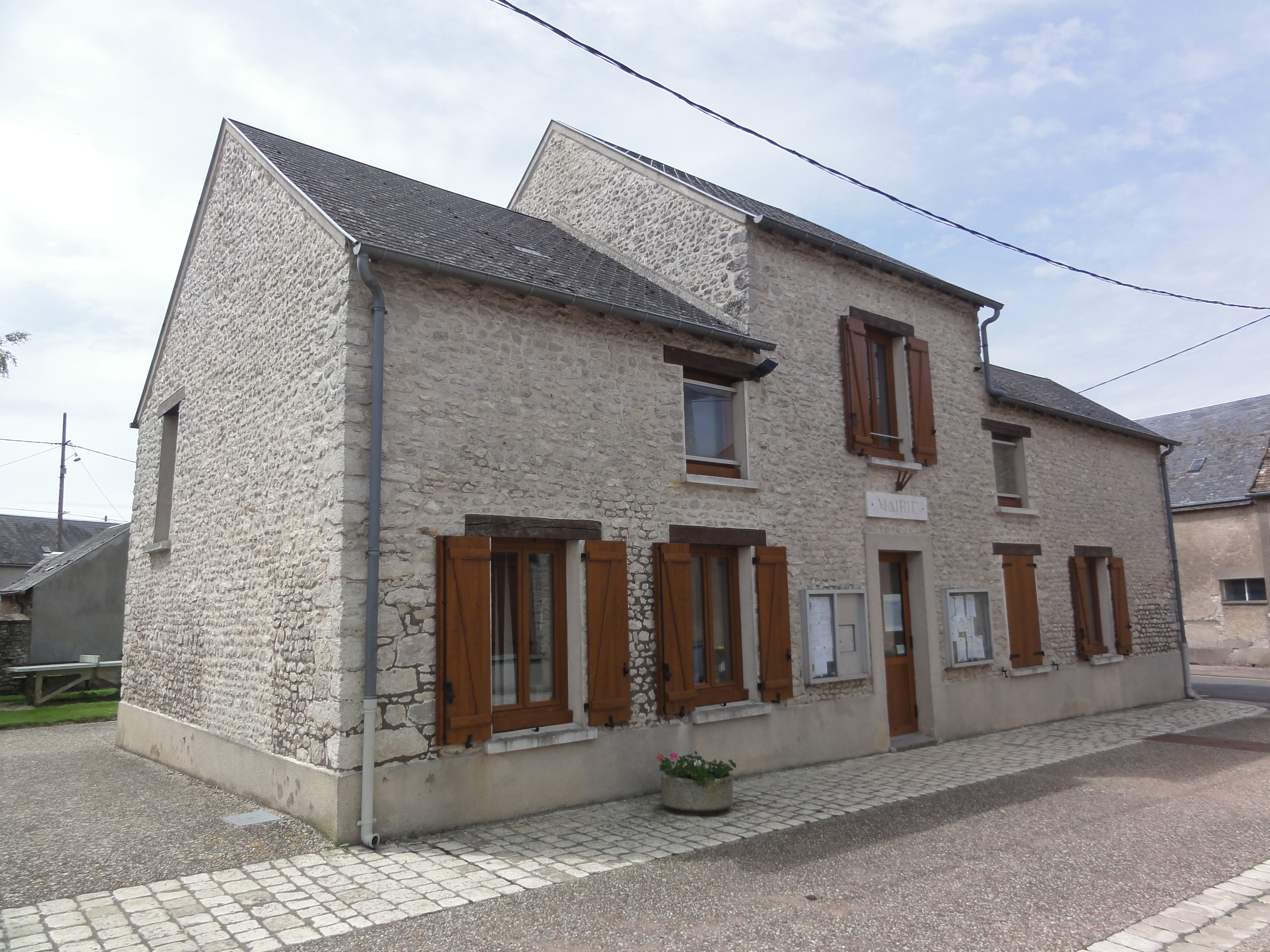
- The town hall in Boisseaux

- Coat of arms
- Location of Boisseaux
- Location within France Location within Centre-Val de Loire
- Coordinates: 48°15′27″N 1°59′19″E
- Country: France
- Region: Centre-Val de Loire
- Department: Loiret
- Arrondissement: Pithiviers
- Canton: Pithiviers
- Intercommunality: Plaine du Nord Loiret

Government
  - Mayor (2020–2026): Patrick Choffy
- Area^{1}: 7.19 km^{2} (2.78 sq mi)
- Highest elevation: 140 m (460 ft)
- Lowest elevation: 124 m (407 ft)
- Population (2023): 492
  - Density: 68.4/km^{2} (177/sq mi)
- Time zone: UTC+01:00 (CET)
  - Summer (DST): UTC+02:00 (CEST)
- INSEE/Postal code: 45037 /45480
- ^{1} French Land Register data, which excludes lakes, ponds, glaciers > 1 km^{2} (0.386 sq mi or 247 acres) and river estuaries.

Boisseaux (French pronunciation: [bwaso]) is a commune in the Loiret department in north-central France. Boisseaux station has rail connections to Orléans, Étampes and Paris.

== Population ==
Historical population
Year	Pop.	±% p.a.
1968	293	—
1975	244	−2.58%
1982	234	−0.60%
1990	212	−1.23%
1999	253	+1.98%
2007	360	+4.51%
2012	441	+4.14%
2017	497	+2.42%
2023	492	−0.17%
Source: INSEE

== See also ==
- Communes of the Loiret department
