= Monnerville =

Commune in Île-de-France, France

- Commune
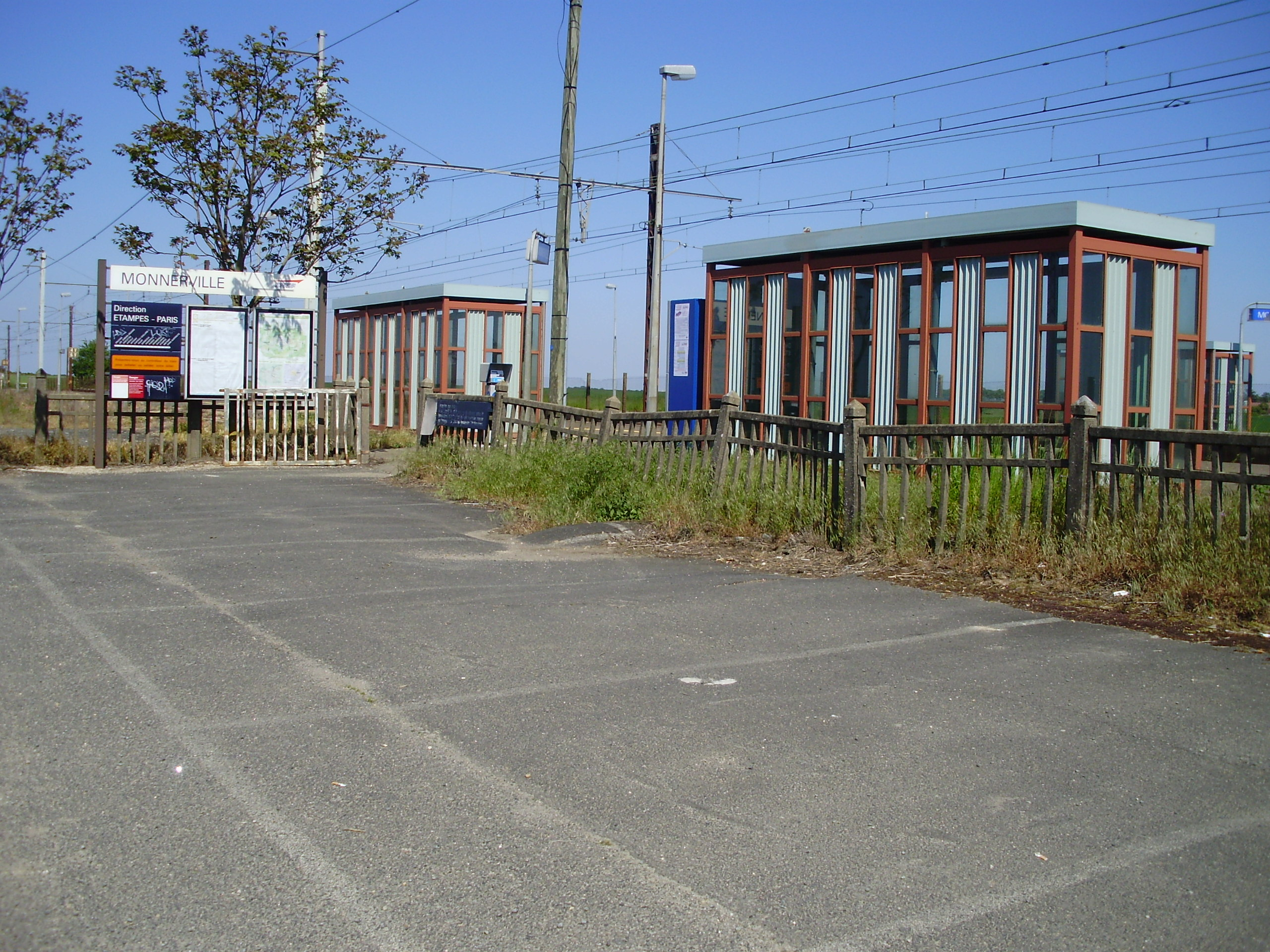
- Monnerville station located in the commune.

- Coat of arms
- Location of Monnerville
- Location within France Location within Île-de-France (region)
- Coordinates: 48°20′48″N 2°02′38″E
- Country: France
- Region: Île-de-France
- Department: Essonne
- Arrondissement: Étampes
- Canton: Étampes
- Intercommunality: CA Étampois Sud Essonne

Government
  - Mayor (2020–2026): Angélina Dardenne
- Area^{1}: 8.31 km^{2} (3.21 sq mi)
- Highest elevation: 146 m (479 ft)
- Lowest elevation: 115 m (377 ft)
- Population (2023): 376
  - Density: 45.2/km^{2} (117/sq mi)
- Time zone: UTC+01:00 (CET)
  - Summer (DST): UTC+02:00 (CEST)
- INSEE/Postal code: 91414 /91930
- ^{1} French Land Register data, which excludes lakes, ponds, glaciers > 1 km^{2} (0.386 sq mi or 247 acres) and river estuaries.

Monnerville (French pronunciation: [mɔnɛʁvil]) is a commune in the Essonne department in Île-de-France in northern France. Monnerville station has rail connections to Orléans, Étampes and Paris.

Inhabitants of Monnerville are known as Monnervillois.

== See also ==
- Communes of the Essonne department
