= Angerville, Essonne =

Commune in Île-de-France, France

Angerville
- Commune
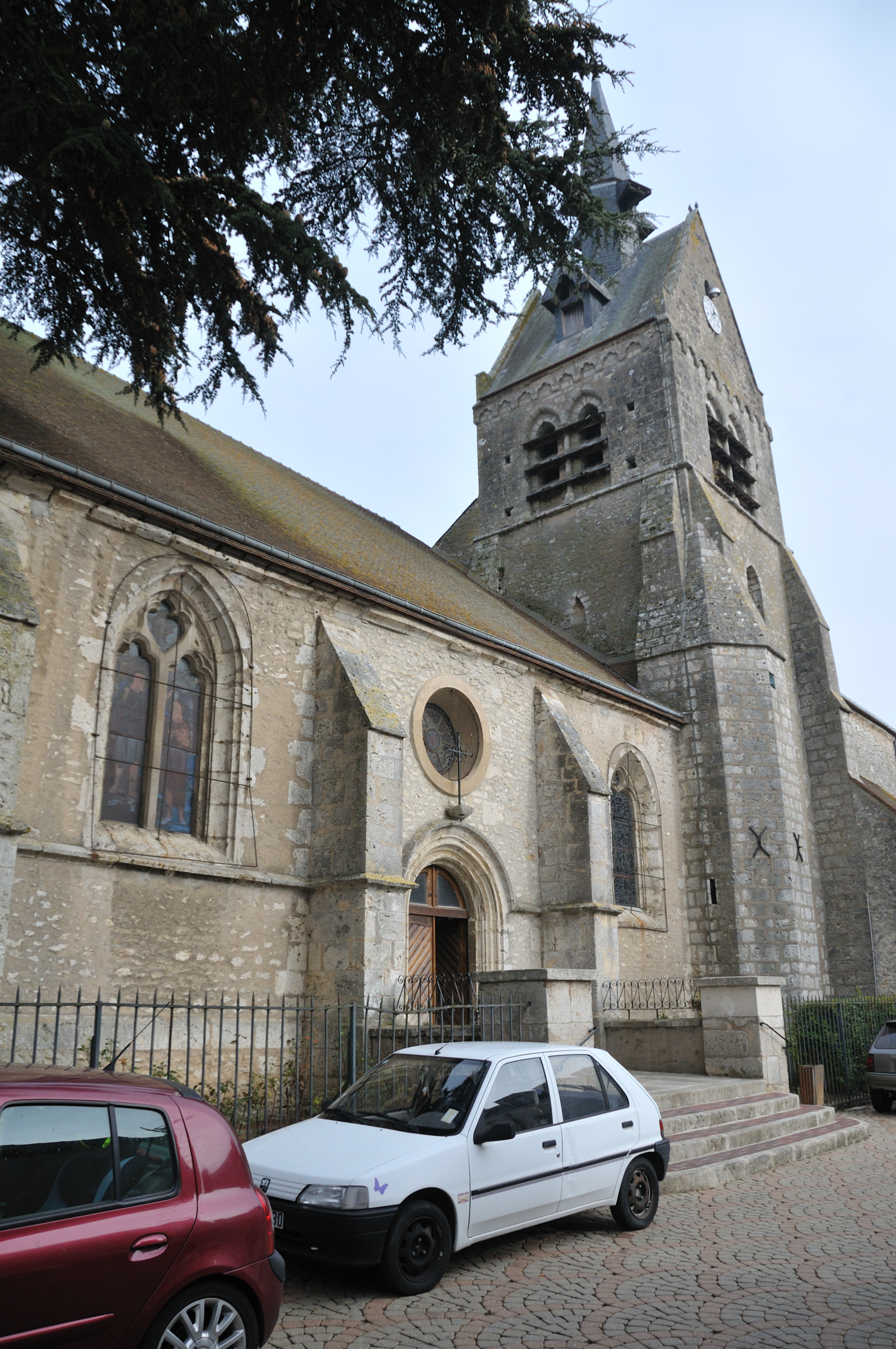
- The church of Saint-Pierre-et-Saint-Eutrope, in Angerville

- Coat of arms
- Location of Angerville
- Location within France Location within Île-de-France (region)
- Coordinates: 48°18′39″N 1°59′51″E
- Country: France
- Region: Île-de-France
- Department: Essonne
- Arrondissement: Étampes
- Canton: Étampes
- Intercommunality: CA Étampois Sud Essonne

Government
  - Mayor (2020–2026): Johann Mittelhausser
- Area^{1}: 25.83 km^{2} (9.97 sq mi)
- Highest elevation: 146 m (479 ft)
- Lowest elevation: 113 m (371 ft)
- Population (2023): 4,428
  - Density: 171.4/km^{2} (444.0/sq mi)
- Time zone: UTC+01:00 (CET)
  - Summer (DST): UTC+02:00 (CEST)
- INSEE/Postal code: 91016 /91670
- ^{1} French Land Register data, which excludes lakes, ponds, glaciers > 1 km^{2} (0.386 sq mi or 247 acres) and river estuaries.

Angerville (French pronunciation: [ɑ̃ʒɛʁvil]) is a commune in the Essonne department in Île-de-France in northern France. Angerville station has rail connections to Orléans, Étampes and Paris.

== Population ==
Historical population
Year	Pop.	±% p.a.
1968	1,926	—
1975	2,597	+4.36%
1982	2,622	+0.14%
1990	3,012	+1.75%
1999	3,265	+0.90%
2007	3,375	+0.42%
2012	4,137	+4.16%
2017	4,270	+0.63%
2023	4,428	+0.61%
Source: INSEE

Inhabitants are known as Angervillois in French.
