= Santilly, Eure-et-Loir =

Santilly
- Commune
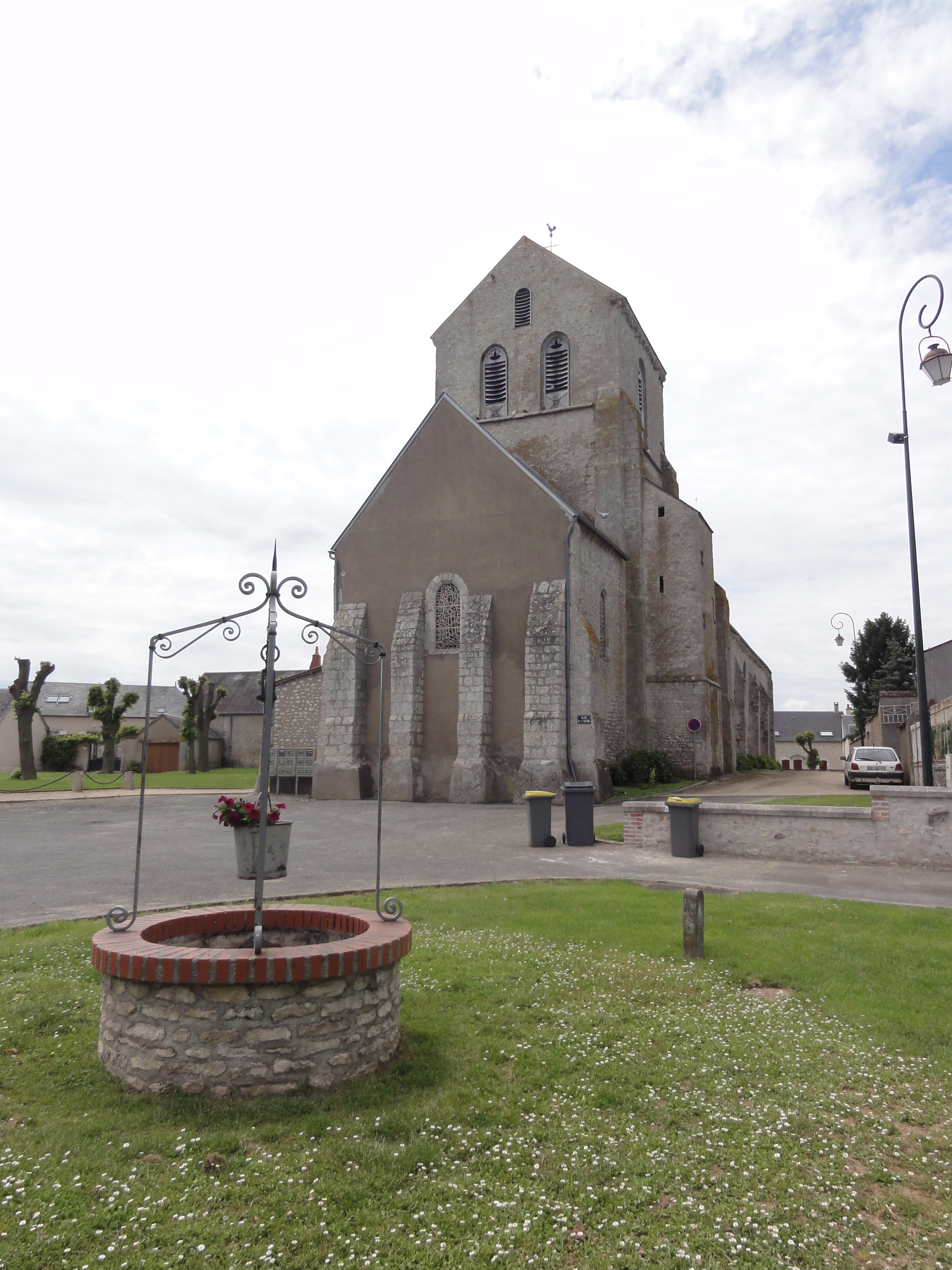
- The church in Santilly
- Location of Santilly
- Location within France Location within Centre-Val de Loire
- Coordinates: 48°08′50″N 1°52′22″E
- Country: France
- Region: Centre-Val de Loire
- Department: Eure-et-Loir
- Arrondissement: Chartres
- Canton: Les Villages Vovéens

Government
  - Mayor (2020–2026): Jean-Paul Lachaume
- Area^{1}: 17.66 km^{2} (6.82 sq mi)
- Highest elevation: 139 m (456 ft)
- Lowest elevation: 123 m (404 ft)
- Population (2023): 303
  - Density: 17.2/km^{2} (44.4/sq mi)
- Time zone: UTC+01:00 (CET)
  - Summer (DST): UTC+02:00 (CEST)
- INSEE/Postal code: 28367 /28310
- ^{1} French Land Register data, which excludes lakes, ponds, glaciers > 1 km^{2} (0.386 sq mi or 247 acres) and river estuaries.

Santilly is a commune in the Eure-et-Loir department in northern France. The parish church is dedicated to Saint-Pantaléon.

Santilly is served by Château-Gaillard station to the east of the commune, with rail connections to Orléans, Étampes and Paris.

== Population ==
Historical population
Year	Pop.	±% p.a.
1968	402	—
1975	361	−1.53%
1982	312	−2.06%
1990	271	−1.75%
1999	305	+1.32%
2007	361	+2.13%
2012	349	−0.67%
2017	339	−0.58%
2023	303	−1.85%
Source: INSEE

== See also ==
- Communes of the Eure-et-Loir department
