= Étampes station =

Railway station in Étampes, France

Étampes
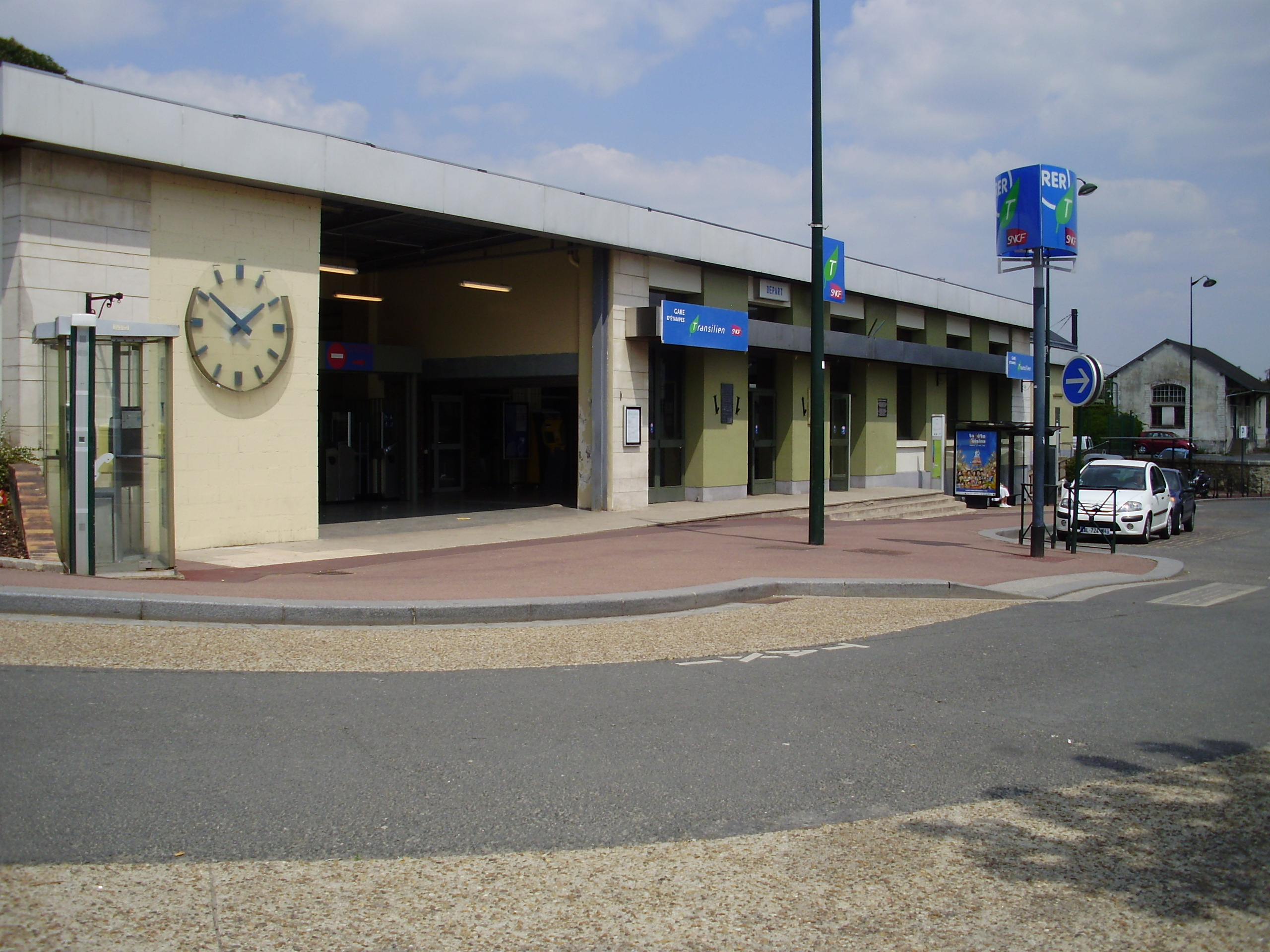
- Étampes railway station

General information
- Location: Place du Général-Leclerc; 91150 Étampes; Essonne, France
- Coordinates: 48°26′12″N 2°09′35″E
- Lines: Paris–Bordeaux railway Étampes–Beaune-la-Rolande railway
- Platforms: 5
- Tracks: 5 + yards

Other information
- Station code: 87545137
- Fare zone: 5

History
- Opened: 5 May 1843

Passengers
- 2024: 3,054,293

Services
Preceding station	Le Réseau Rémi	Following station
Guillerval towards Orléans	1.1	Paris-Austerlitz Terminus
Preceding station	RER	Following station
Étréchy towards Saint-Quentin-en-Yvelines	RER C	Saint-Martin-d'Étampes Terminus
Location

Étampes station (French: Gare d'Étampes) is a railway station in Étampes, Essonne, France. The station was opened in 1843 and is on the Paris–Bordeaux railway and Étampes–Beaune-la-Rolande railway. The station is served by Paris' express suburban rail system, the RER. The train services are operated by SNCF.

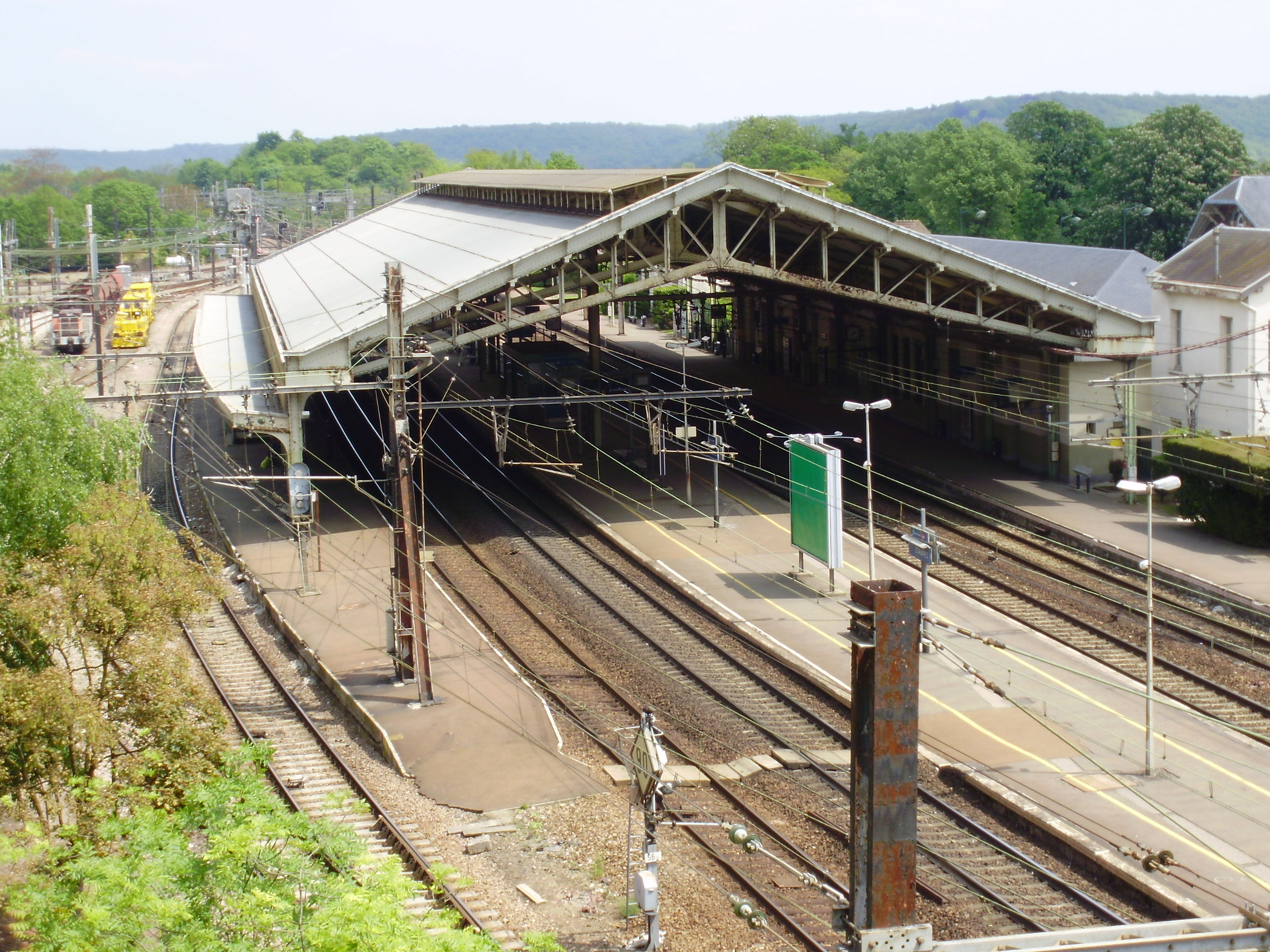
Étampes station and station roof

== Train services ==
The station is served by regional trains (TER Centre-Val de Loire) to Orléans and Paris, and by local RER C trains to Paris and its suburbs.

== See also ==
- List of SNCF stations in Île-de-France
- List of stations of the Paris RER
