= Horseball =

Team sport on horseback

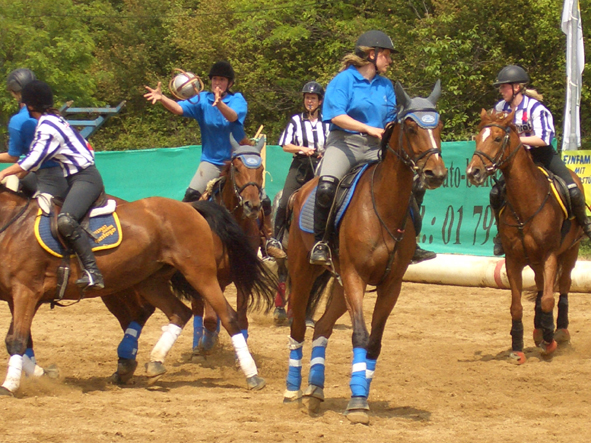
- Horseball
- Highest governing body: International Horseball Federation (1999)
- First played: 1930 Informal / 1970 Formal in France

Characteristics
- Contact: None
- Team members: 4 per side (+ 2)
- Mixed-sex: Yes
- Type: Team sport; ball game
- Equipment: Ball; Horse

Presence
- Country or region: Worldwide

Horseball game

Horseball is a sport played on horseback where a ball is handled and goals are scored by shooting it through a hoop with a diameter of 1 m. The sport is a combination of polo, rugby union, rugby league, netball, and basketball. It is one of the ten disciplines officially recognized by the International Federation for Equestrian Sports (FEI); in 2015 the International Horseball Federation (FIHB) and the International University Sports Federation (FISU) signed memorandums of understanding with the FEI.

== Origins ==
Horseball was invented by Captain Clave of the French Army, a show jumping world champion. The ball and the basis of the Goals was borrowed from Pato, the Argentine national sport but there the similarity ends. The game was designed to improve partnerships between horses and riders, that could be played on a standard equestrian arena, and would be fun to play. It was developed by a French group under the presidency of Jean Paul Depons, a riding instructor and rugby player from Bordeaux. This group established the rules of horseball in France.

In the late 1970s, the French Equestrian Federation (FFE) accepted horseball as a discipline and it soon became popular in France. Horseball spread internationally in the early 1990s. In 1992 the International Commission of Horseball was established, with France, Belgium, Germany, Great Britain, Italy, and Portugal as members. The first European Cup was held in Paris in December 1992, at the Salon De Cheval.

Another source of inspiration for horse-ball is an ancient Afghan equestrian sport, Buzkashi.

== Rules of play ==
Horseball is an equestrian sport that is like a combination of rugby and basketball, played on horseback. It is a fast-paced team game, with the objective of scoring goals. Each team has four players, and two substitutes. Teams must make at least three passes between different players before scoring. Players can be substituted at any break of play. The ball is a football held in a harness with six handles, so that it can be picked up. Players may hold the ball for less than 10 seconds, and must pass the ball when making an attack. If the ball falls to the ground, players may only pick it up without changing pace, or dismounting. This is called "ramassage". Players score by throwing the ball through a goal. This is a 1-metre diameter vertical hoop at the end of the pitch, suspended 3.5 metres from the ground and hung 1-metre into the pitch. The game is usually played on a rectangular pitch, with dimensions of 65 meters by 25 meters. Games last 20 minutes, in two 10-minute halves, and with a 3-minute half-time break when the teams change ends. The team that scores the most goals win.

== International Horseball Federation ==
The International Horseball Federation (FIHB) was formed in 1999.

In 1992 the International Commission of Horseball was established, with France, Belgium, Germany, Great Britain, Italy, and Portugal as members. The first European Cup was held in Paris in December 1992, at the Salon du Cheval.

Recognized by the International Equestrian Federation (FEI) since 2015, it has been chaired by Frederico Cannas since its creation.

=== Members ===
18 nations in march 2025:

1. Asia (2): JPN, KGZ (Former: PAK, CHN)
2. Oceania (1): AUS
3. Americas (7): ARG, BRA, CAN, USA, MEX, URU, CHI (Former: CAY)
4. Europe (8): BEL, AUT, FRA, GBR, ITA, NED, POR, ESP
5. Africa (0): (Former: ALG)

=== Ranking ===
1. France
2. Spain
3. Italy
4. Portugal
5. Belgium
6. United Kingdom
7. Argentina
8. Canada
9. Australia
10. Japan
11. Kyrgyzstan

== International Competitions ==
The FIHB organize several international competitions: the European Championship, the World Championship, and the clubs FIHB Champions League. The annual European Senior Championship is the older international tournament, the first was in 1992 in Paris. This is a mixed-sex teams tournament. The European Ladies Championship was first held in 2003 in Abano Terme 2003 (Italy). The European Under-16 Championship is the youth tournament with mixed-sex teams, the first in 2004 in Lamotte-Beuvron 2004 (France). The World Championships for senior mixed teams were first held at Ponte de Lima in 2008. The teams that played in the championship were Argentina, Austria, Belgium, Brazil, Canada, France, Germany, Great Britain, Italy, Portugal, Spain. France won, Spain got Silver, and Portugal Bronze. World championships are held every four years, with the next competition due to be held in Argentina in 2025.

The club level competition organized by the International Horseball Federation is the FIHB Champions League. This competition began in 2007 in Stockholm, Sweden, between the top clubs from each of the four highest ranked European nations. In 2007, it was won by Chambly Horse-Ball France), Sporting Clube de Portugal CEJC got Silver and Caramel from Belgium got Bronze. The 2024 competition was held in Le Mans, and involved the top clubs from eight nations.

== Events ==
1. FIHB Champions League Since 2007 Men / 2014 Women
2. France Horseball Championship Since 1979 Mixed / 1985 Women
3. World Horseball Championship Since 2009 Mixed / 2016 Women
4. European Horseball Championship Since 1992 Mixed / 2003 Women
5. U21 European Horseball Championship
6. U16 European Horseball Championship
7. Under10 FIHB Horseball Challenge

=== 2025 Competitions Programs ===
2025 FIHB WHR World Cup, Ladies & Pro Elite

2025 FIHB WHR U16 & U21 European Championships & U10 Horseball Challenge

FIHB WHR I Europa League 2025

FIHB WHR II Northe League 2025

FIHB III Iberian League 2024–2025

FIHB VI Mediterranean League 2024–2025

=== European Horseball Championship ===
Since 1992 Mixed / 2003 Women

==== Mixed Medals (1992–2023) ====
Rank	Nation	Gold	Silver	Bronze	Total
1	France	19	2	0	21
2	Spain	2	6	1	9
3	Portugal	0	7	4	11
4	Belgium	0	5	11	16
5	Italy	0	1	3	4
6	Austria	0	0	1	1
6	Great Britain	0	0	1	1
Totals (7 entries)		21	21	21	63

==== Women Medals (2003–2023) ====
Rank	Nation	Gold	Silver	Bronze	Total
1	France	12	0	0	12
2	Spain	0	4	4	8
3	Belgium	0	3	1	4
4	Portugal	0	2	3	5
5	Germany	0	2	1	3
6	Great Britain	0	1	2	3
7	Italy	0	0	1	1
Totals (7 entries)		12	12	12	36

=== World Horseball Championship ===
Since 2009 Mixed / 2016 Women

==== Mixed Medals (2009–2022) ====
Rank	Nation	Gold	Silver	Bronze	Total
1	France	4	0	0	4
2	Spain	0	3	0	3
3	Belgium	0	1	0	1
4	Portugal	0	0	3	3
5	Italy	0	0	1	1
Totals (5 entries)		4	4	4	12

==== Women Medals (2016–2022) ====
Rank	Nation	Gold	Silver	Bronze	Total
1	France	2	0	0	2
2	Portugal	0	1	0	1
2	Spain	0	1	0	1
4	Italy	0	0	2	2
Totals (4 entries)		2	2	2	6

== Accidents ==
As with all equestrian activities, horseball can be high risk. The sport rules are designed and implemented to reduce the risks as much as possible to allow for safe play. Because of this, accidents are fortunately rare, however there have been a few notable incidents:

- In February 2017, Ruddy Dayton fell from his horse during a competition in Saint-Nazaire, France. He was knocked unconscious, spent a week in a coma and suffered traumatic brain damage from the accident. He has since been recovering well.
- A 34-year-old rider died in May 2019 after a fall during a horseball competition in Rosières-aux-Salines, France.
- In April 2022, Victoria Percy died after falling off her horse when it tripped while playing in a horseball league competition in Warwickshire, UK.

== See also ==
- Buzkashi
- Pato
- Polo
