= French Equestrian Federation =

French sport federation

- Sport: Equestrian
- Jurisdiction: France
- Abbreviation: FFE
- Founded: 1921
- Affiliation: FEI
- Affiliation date: 1987
- Headquarters: Lamotte-Beuvron
- President: Serge Lecomte
- Secretary: Frédéric Bouix

Official website
- www.ffe.com
- (France)

The French Equestrian Federation (FFE) (French: Fédération française d'équitation) is a non-profit organization responsible for the management, promotion and development of equestrian disciplines in France. It also contributes to the selection of sport and leisure horses.

The FFE is a member of the International Federation for Equestrian Sports (FEI by its acronym in French) and the French National Olympic and Sports Committee (CNOSF by its acronym in French).

In 2017, the FFE had 644,800 members. It is France's third-largest (single-sport) sports federation in terms of the number of members, the fourth-largest in terms of the total number of federation memberships, and the second-largest equestrian federation in the world. Women account for 83% of the FFE's membership, and 27% are under ten years of age. One of the federation's challenges is to encourage young people growing up to continue riding. Between 1984 and 2011, the number of FFE members rose by 374%.

== History ==
=== General ===
The French Equestrian Federation was founded in 1921. In 1963, an Association nationale pour le tourisme équestre (ANTE) was created with the support of the Haras nationaux, and grew thanks to the new popular craze for leisure riding. In 1971, the Poney Club de France appeared, thanks to the renewed support of the Haras nationaux, reaping the rewards of the penetration of pony riding among children.

Thus, until 1987, the French horse world was divided into three independent entities, before the French Equestrian Federation was created that year, unifying and grouping the entities. Delegations were nevertheless set up: the Délégation nationale aux sports équestres (DNSE); the Délégation nationale au tourisme équestre (DNTE); and the Délégation nationale à l'équitation sur Poneys (DNEP).

In 1999, the FFE's statutes changed, and the delegations were dissolved, although the specialties were still represented on the Steering Committee, which comprised a Horse Committee, a Pony Committee, a Tourism Committee and a Competition College.

=== Sports modernization Act in 2000 ===
The Sports Modernization Act of 2000 led to the creation of new statutes. These, creating the CREIF (Comité Régional d'Equitation d'Ile de France by its extension in French), were approved by the equestrian centers with 94.24% of the votes cast. The former independent bodies : Comité régional de tourisme équestre, Délégation régionale à l'équitation sur poney (DREP) and Ligue régionale des sports équestres were grouped together under the CREIF umbrella, thus guaranteeing the continuity of their specificity. The CREIF inherited the Ligues de Fontainebleau, Versailles, ARTE and DREP Île-de-France through a merger-absorption process. This administrative restructuring is in line with regional state administrations and political bodies.

The CREIF now heads 8 departments: Paris, Seine-et-Marne, Yvelines, Essonne, Hauts-de-Seine, Seine-Saint-Denis, Val-de-Marne and Val-d'Oise, representing more than 600 equestrian associations and establishments affiliated to the FFE and more than 100,000 licensees, its mission is to encourage, promote, develop and organize equestrian activities in all forms and practices.

The CREIF is one of the FFE's 23 deconcentrated bodies, following the law on the modernization of sport.

=== "Lamour" law 2005-2006 ===
By order dated 2 and 3 2005, the FFE lost its approval and delegation from the French Ministry of Youth, Sports and the Voluntary Sector. The Federation is accused of failing to bring its statutes into line with the so-called "Lamour" law no. 2003-708 of 1 August 2003. The Ministry of Agriculture and Fisheries also withdrew its approval by order dated 6 October 2005.

The main reason why the FFE has not updated its statutes is that the Lamour law de facto imposes an under-representation in voting rights of commercial equestrian clubs, which represent the majority in number, to the benefit of non-commercial structures.

In 2004, Serge Lecomte's re-election as FFE president led to legal proceedings initiated by the unsuccessful candidate, Jacqueline Reverdy. The FFE was placed under judicial administration, entrusted to Monique Legrand, following the annulment of Serge Lecomte's election by the Paris Tribunal de Grande Instance.

To ensure continuity of public service, the French National Olympic and Sports Committee (CNOSF by its acronym in French) temporarily exercises the prerogatives lost by the FFE following the withdrawal of its approval and delegation. In particular, it has authority over the organization of competitions and high-level sport. A specialized Equestrian Commission has been set up. Various agreements between the FFE and the CNOSF enable activities to run smoothly, particularly for competitions and top-level sport.

The FFE's new statutes were adopted at the Extraordinary General Meeting on 19 June 2006, raising hopes of normalized relations between the French government and the FFE. As a result, in September 2006, the FFE was once again approved by the public authorities.

In a decree dated December 21, 2006, the Minister for Youth, Sports and the Voluntary Sector once again granted the FFE the delegation provided for in article 131-14 of the French Sports Code, thus putting an end to several years of conflict between the association and the public authorities.

In 2008, the FFE's statutes underwent further changes. The head office was moved from Boulogne-Billancourt to the Federal Equestrian Park de Lamotte-Beuvron.

=== Members ===
Number of members by year
Year	Total members	Women		Men		Year-on-year change	Comments
1984	145,071	-	-	-	-	-	-
1985	147,108	-	-	-	-	▲ +1,4 %	-
1986	160,235	-	-	-	-	▲ +8,92 %	-
1987	166,915	-	-	-	-	▲ +4,17 %	-
1988	199,952	-	-	-	-	▲ +0,02 %	-
1989	166,154	-	-	-	-	▼ −0,48 %	-
1990	214,007	-	-	-	-	▲ +28,8 %	-
1991	230,575	-	-	-	-	▲ +7,74 %	-
1992	239,282	-	-	-	-	▲ +3,78 %	-
1993	258,808	-	-	-	-	▲ +8,16 %	-
1994	274,873	-	-	-	-	▲ +6,21 %	-
1995	325,670	-	-	-	-	▲ +18,48 %	-
1996	345,882	-	-	-	-	▲ +6,21 %	-
1997	364,686	-	-	-	-	▲ +5,44 %	-
1998	391,624	-	-	-	-	▲ +7,39 %	-
1999	411,657	-	-	-	-	▲ +5,12 %	-
2000	434,980	-	-	-	-	▲ +5,67 %	-
2001	432,498	319,640	(73,91 %)	112,858	(26,09 %)	▼ −0,57 %	-
2002	447,139	332,798	(74,43 %)	114,341	(25,57 %)	▲ +3,39 %	-
2003	462,955	348,045	(75,18 %)	114,910	(24,82 %)	▲ +3,54 %	-
2004	484,760	368,699	(76,06 %)	116,061	(23,94 %)	▲ +4,71 %	-
2005	513,615	394,767	(76,86 %)	118,848	(23,14 %)	▲ +5,95 %	-
2006	523,696	406,241	(77,57 %)	117,455	(22,43 %)	▲ +1,96 %	-
2007	553,560	434,838	(78,55 %)	118,722	(21,45 %)	▲ +5,7 %	-
2008	600,805	477,172	(79,42 %)	123,633	(20,58 %)	▲ +8,53 %	-
2009	650,805	524,195	(80,55 %)	126,242	(19,40 %)	▲ +8,32 %	-
2010	687,334	558,932	(81,32 %)	128,398	(18,68 %)	▲ +5,61 %	-
2011	705,783	580,000	(82,18 %)	125,783	(17,82 %)	▲ +2,68 %	-
2012	706,449	582,788	(82,50 %)	123,661	(17,50 %)	▲ +0,09 %	-
2013	694,480	574,728	(82,76 %)	119,752	(17,24 %)	▼ −1,69 %	-
2014	689,043	570,709	(82,83 %)	118,334	(17,17 %)	▼ −0,78 %	-
2015	673,026	557,821	(82,88 %)	115,205	(17,12 %)	▼ −2,32 %	-
2016	663,194	549,935	(82,92 %)	113,259	(17,08 %)	▼ −1,46 %	-
2017	644,800	535,165	(83,00 %)	109,635	(17,00 %)	▼ −2,77 %	-
2018	628,262	521,656	(83,03 %)	106,606	(16,97 %)	▼ −2,56 %	-
2019	617,524	513,492	(83,15 %)	104,032	(16,85 %)	▼ −1,71 %	-
2020	601,166	502,550	(83,60 %)	98,616	(16,40 %)	▼ −2,65 %	-
2021	665,873	557,724	(83,76 %)	108,149	(16,24 %)	▲ +10,76 %	-
2022	625,258	530,266	(84,81 %)	94,992	(15,19 %)	▼ −6,1 %	Dated 3 March 2022

== List of presidents ==
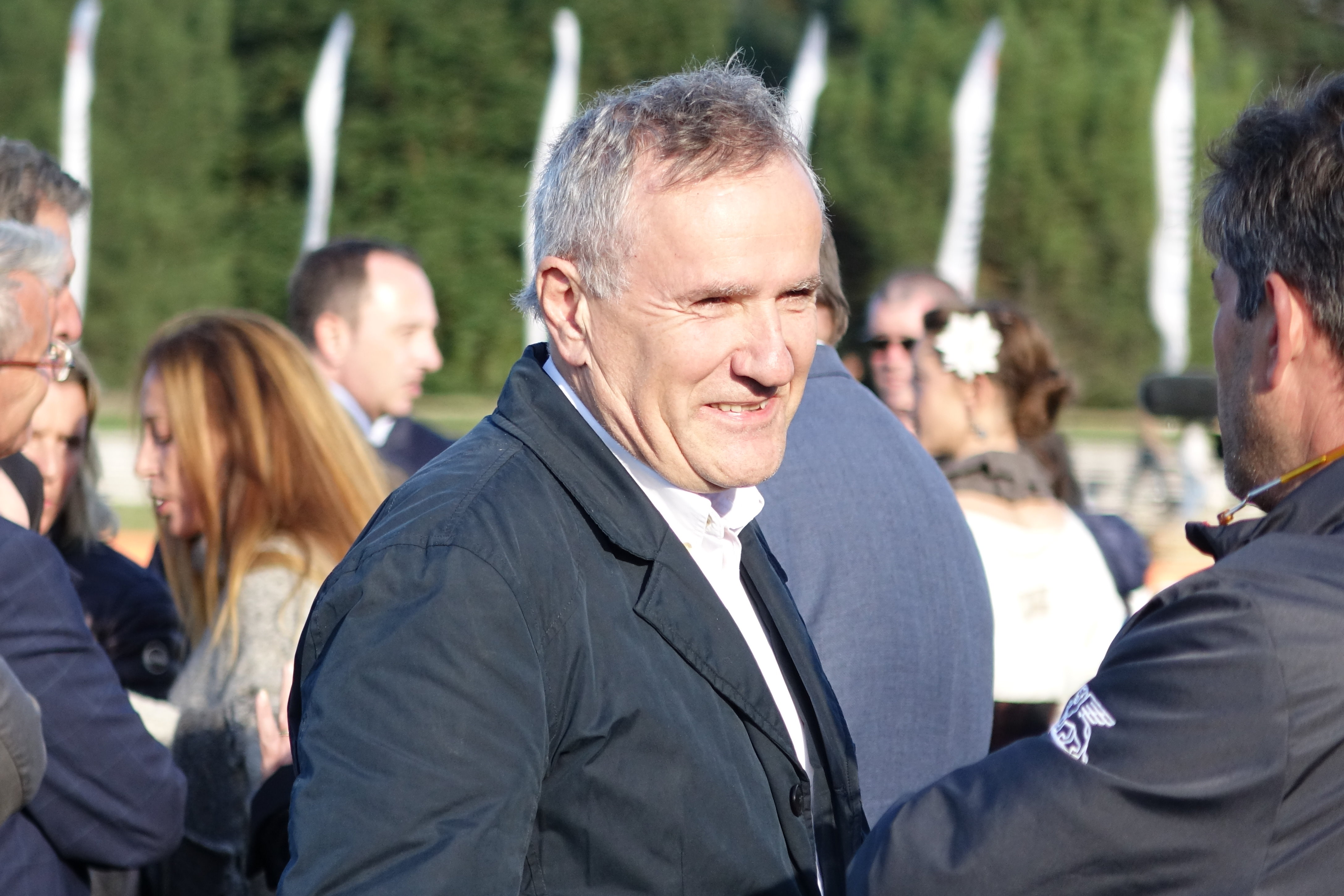

Since its creation in 1921, the Federation has been headed by the following personalities:

- 1921 : Georges du Teil
- 1931 : Détroyat
- 1942 : Eugène Edouard Decarpentry
- 1943 : J. de Juigné
- 1951 : A. Polet-Ternynck
- 1959 : Pierre Guichené
- 1963 : Renom de France
- 1970 : Jean Caucanas
- 1973 : Édouard Pouret
- 1976 : Christian Legrez
- 1985 : Jean-François Chary
- 1988 : Jean Soyer
- 1989 : Loïc Le Masne de Chermont
- 1993 : Pierre Durand
- 1998 : Jacqueline Reverdy
- 2004 : Serge Lecomte
- 2005 : The FFE is placed under administration by Monique Legrand following the annulment of Serge Lecomte's election by the Paris Tribunal de Grande Instance.
- 2006 : Serge Lecomte
