= Centro Ecuestre Palmarejo =

Equestrian center in Palmarejo-Villa Linda, Los Alcarrizos, Dominican Republic

Palmarejo
- Centro Ecuestre Palmarejo
- Interactive map of Palmarejo
- Address: Los Alcarrizos; Dominican Republic
- Location: Palmarejo-Villa Linda
- Coordinates: 18.540388°N 70.0096829°W
- Operator: Federación Dominicana de Deportes Ecuestres
- Capacity: 1,050
- Field size: 1,053 m^{2}

Construction
- Built: 2003
- Cost: RD$ 97 million

The Centro Ecuestre Palmarejo is an equestrian sport venue located in the Palmarejo-Villa Linda municipal district, Los Alcarrizos, Santo Domingo Province, Dominican Republic. The venue is operated by the Dominican Federation of Equestrian Sports all year round.

It was constructed in 2003 for the Pan American Games. In 2005, the National Federation hosted in this complex, the FEI World Dressage Challenge and opened an equestrian school in 2011, after having made renovations to the facilities. The venue was again renovated to host the equestrian competitions of the 2023 Central American and Caribbean Games, meant to be held in San Salvador and holding for the first time at the regional games, an eventing competition. This venue will also host the 2026 Central American and Caribbean Games.

It is comprised by offices for the Dominican Republic Equestrian Sports Federation, cafeteria, press area, 96 stables and veterian clinics.
