= Chinese Equestrian Association =

Chinese Equestrian Association (CEA, Chinese: 中国马术协会) is a national sports association that is registered and managed by the Ministry of Civil Affairs of the People's Republic of China. It is under the operational supervision of the State General Administration of Sports.

== History ==
In 1979, the Chinese Equestrian Association (CEA) was established and became a full member of the International Federation for Equestrian Sports in 1982. It is the sole legal organization that represents China in all international horse sports activities, as well as the International Equestrian Federation and the International Speed Horse Organization (ISHO). It is the most authoritative governing body in the country that oversees horse-related sports.
