= Nouan-le-Fuzelier station =

Railway station in Nouan-le-Fuzelier, France

Coordinates: 47°32′03″N 2°01′59″E

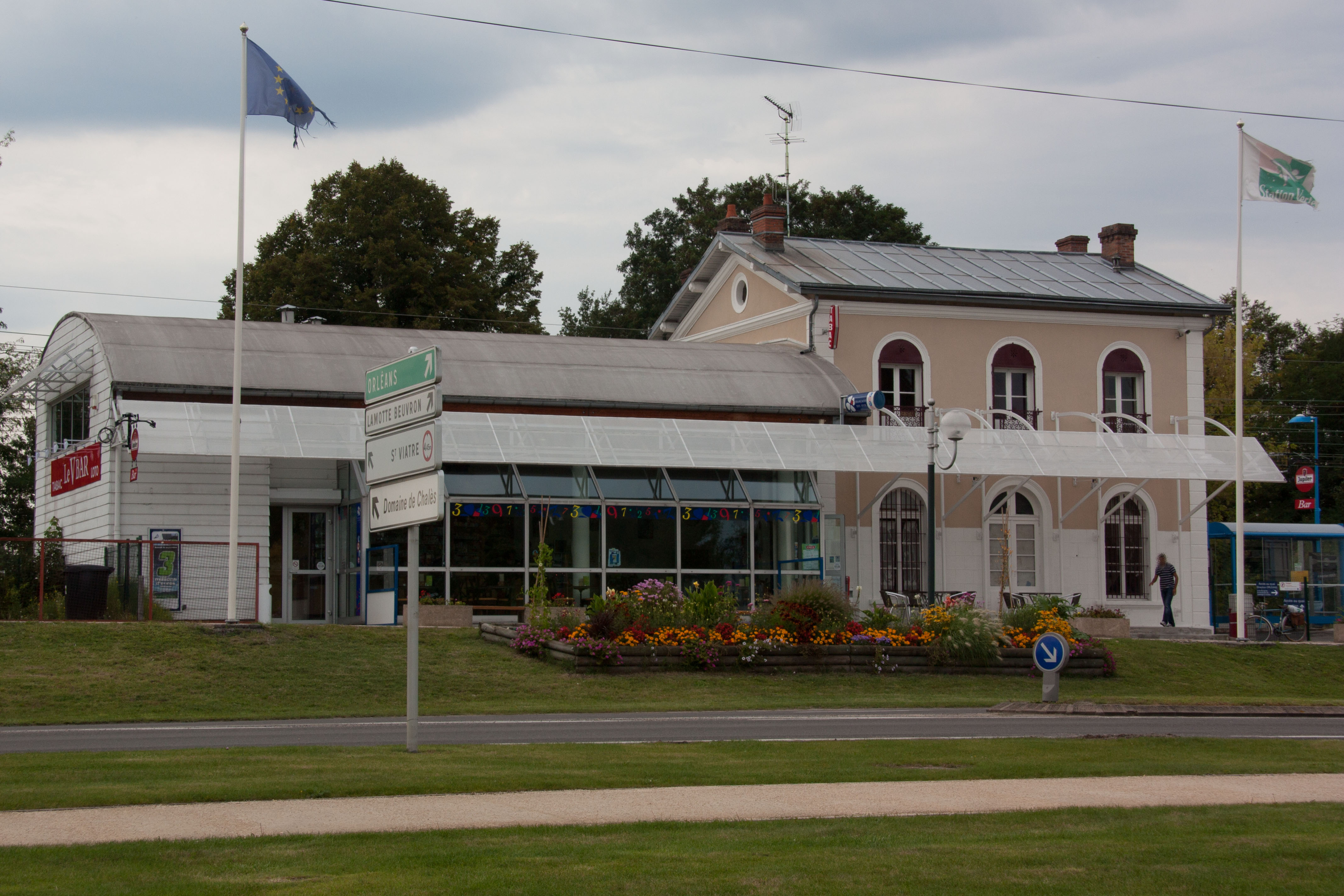
Station seen in 2011

Nouan-le-Fuzelier is a railway station in Nouan-le-Fuzelier, Centre-Val de Loire, France. The station opened on 20 July 1847 and is located on the Orléans–Montauban railway line. The station is served by regional services (TER Centre-Val de Loire) to Vierzon and Orléans.

| Preceding station | Le Réseau Rémi | Following station |
|---|---|---|
| Lamotte-Beuvron towards Orléans | 1.2 | Salbris towards Vierzon |

== Gallery ==
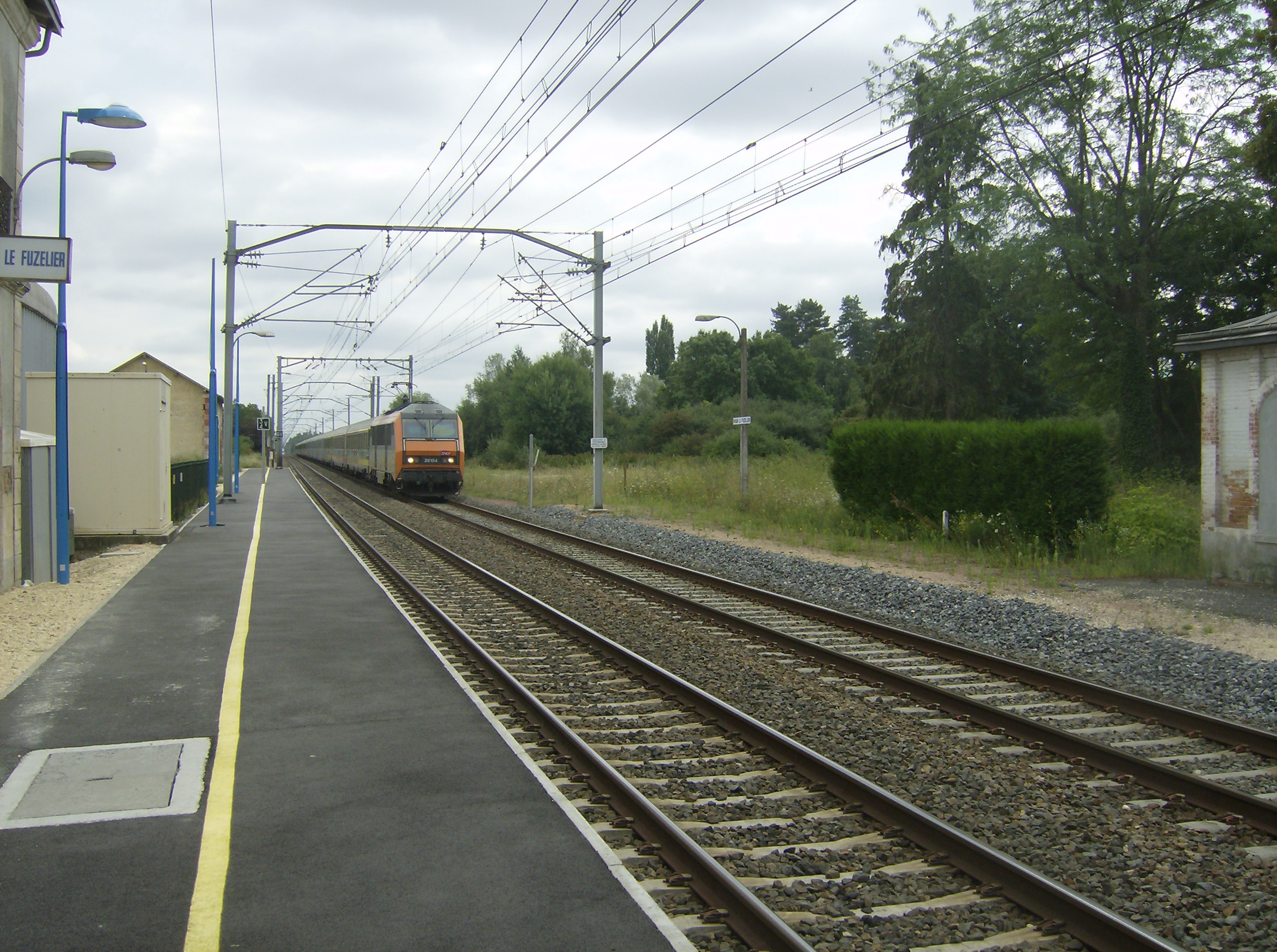
A Sybic passes through Nouan-le-Fuzelier

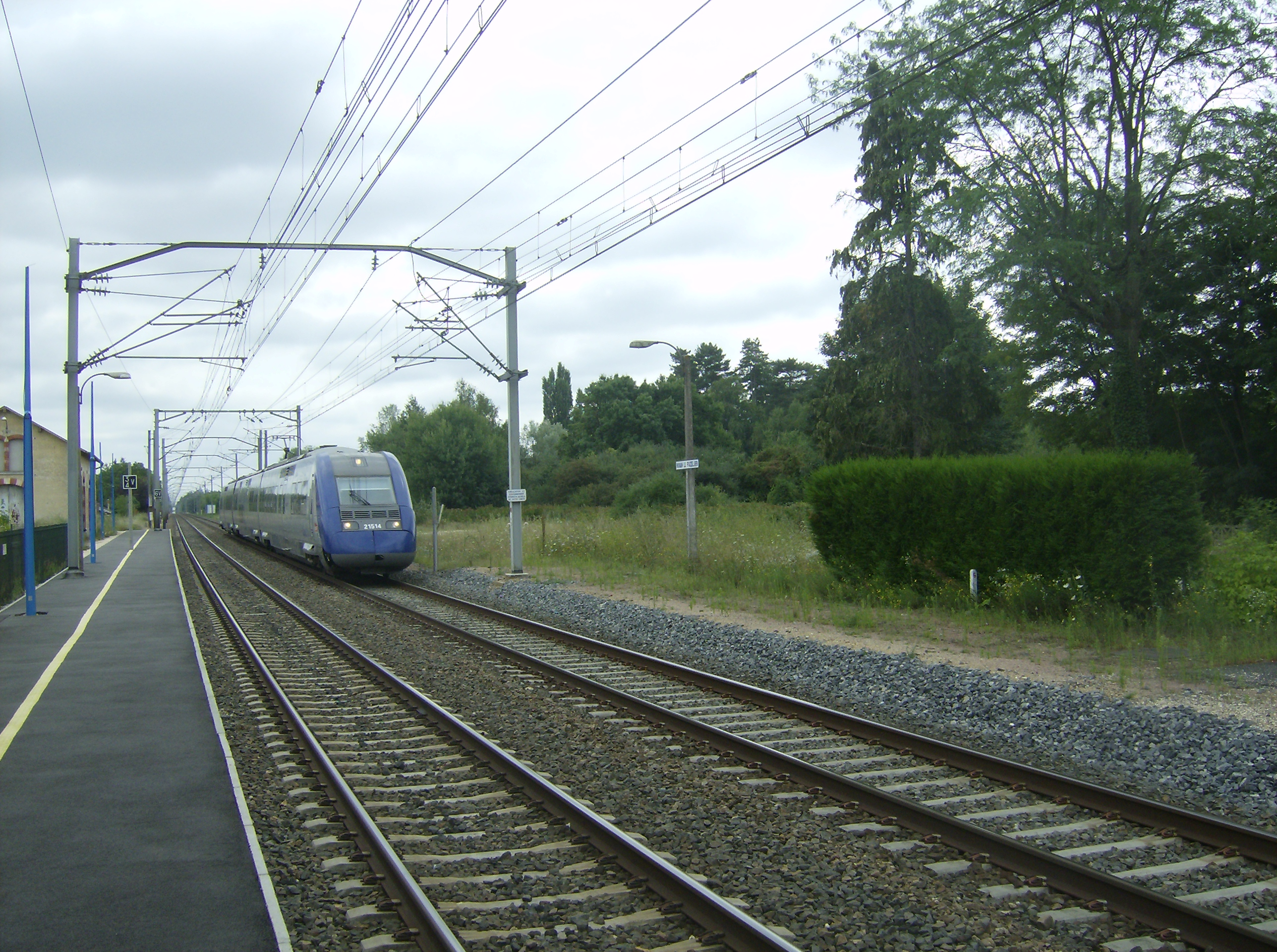
A TER passes through the station

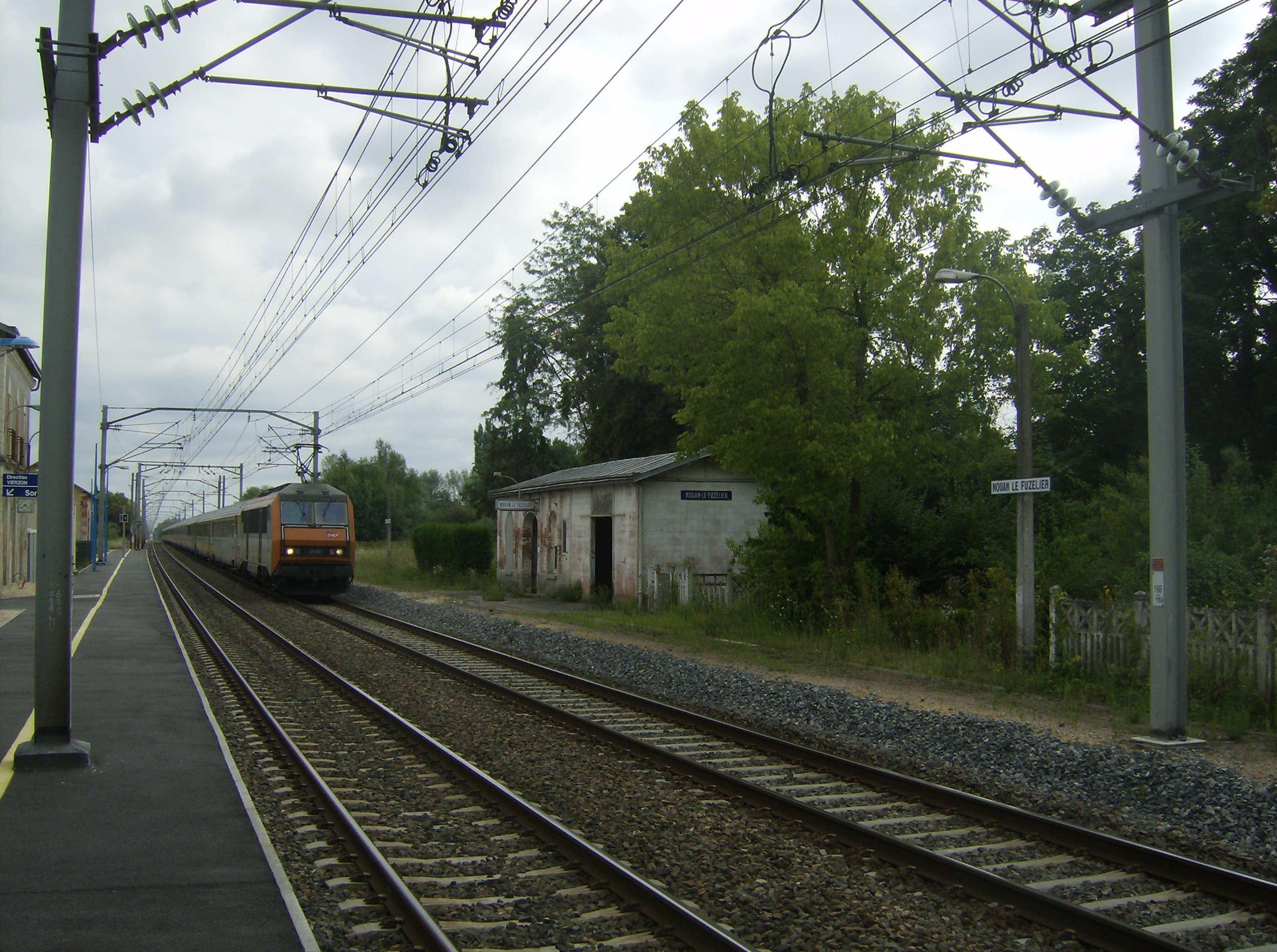
A train approaches the station. The former platform is on the right. The new platform is on the other side of the level crossing.
