= Equestrian Federation of Iraq =

Sports governing body in Iraq

Equestrian Federation of Iraq الاتحاد العراقي للفروسية
- Sport: Equestrian
- Jurisdiction: National
- Abbreviation: EFI
- Affiliation: International Federation for Equestrian Sports
- Affiliation date: 1948
- Headquarters: Baghdad, Jadria, Iraq
- Location: Baghdad, Iraq

Official website
- www.noc-irq.iq
- (Iraq)

Equestrian Federation of Iraq or Equestrian Iraq (EI) (Arabic: الاتحاد العراقي للفروسية);is the national governing body for equestrian sports in Iraq. These sports include the FEI-recognized disciplines of dressage, eventing, show jumping, equestrian vaulting, endurance riding, reining, para-equestrian, and combined driving. EFI also develops and enforces the rules for other events at horse shows.

== History ==
The body was founded in 1948 as the Equestrian Federation of Iraq and was formally affiliated with the International Federation for Equestrian Sports. It's followed by the National Olympic Committee of Iraq

== See also ==
- National Olympic Committee of Iraq
