= Lamotte-Beuvron station =

Railway station in Lamotte-Beuvron, France

Coordinates: 47°35′37″N 2°01′21″E

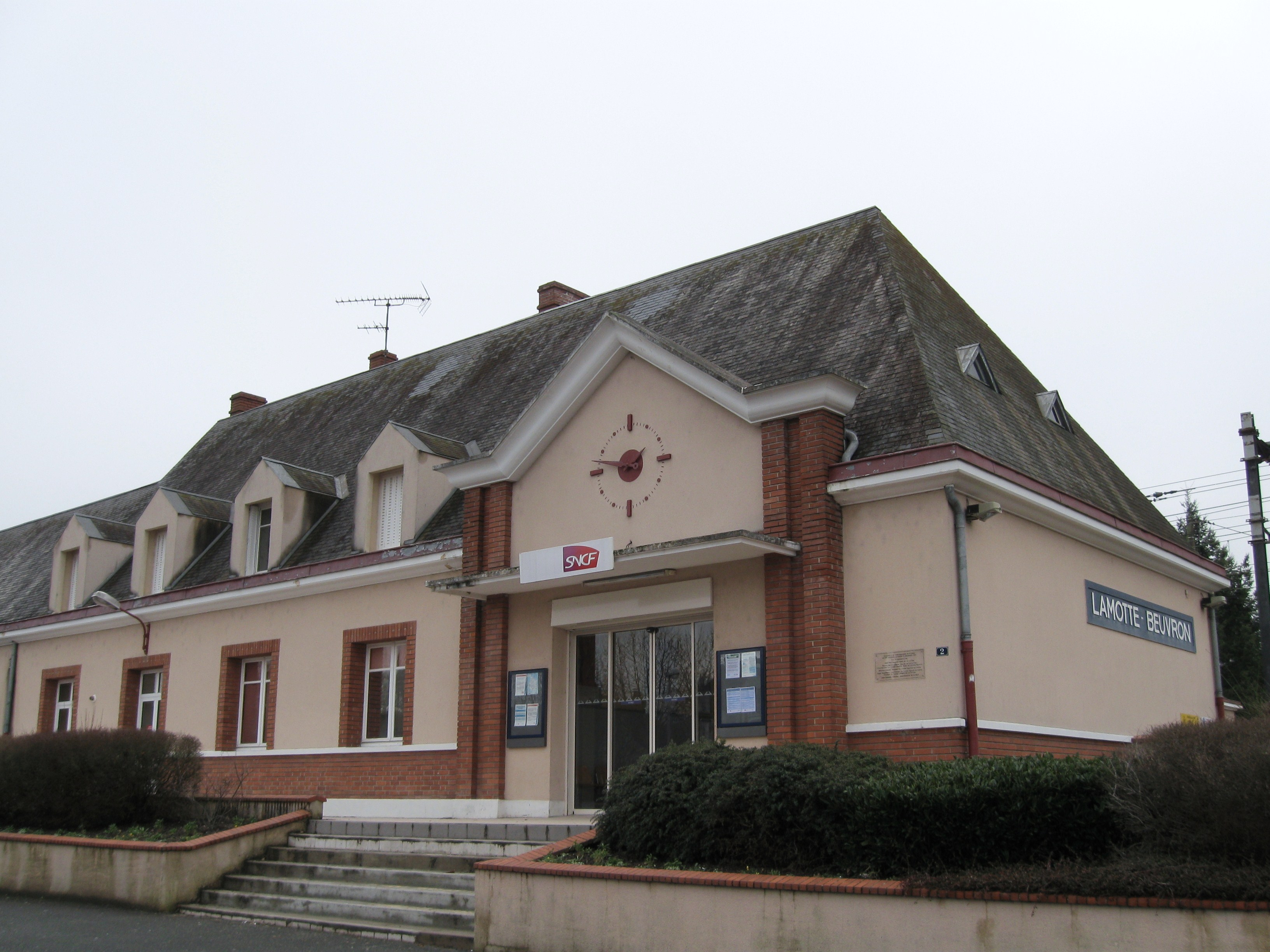
Gare de Lamotte-Beuvron

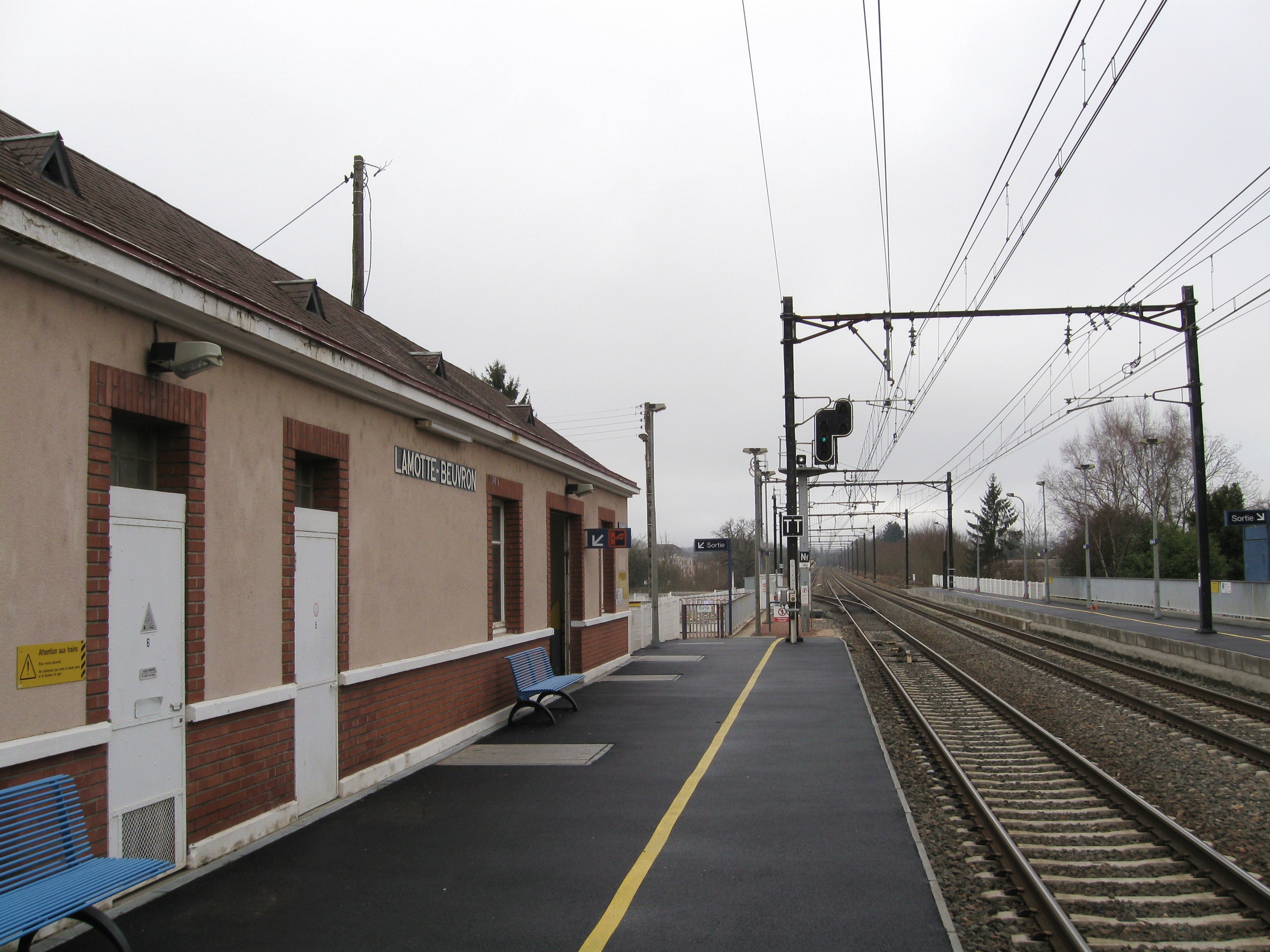
The station

Lamotte-Beuvron is a railway station in Lamotte-Beuvron, Centre-Val de Loire, France. The station opened on 20 July 1847 and is located on the Orléans–Montauban railway line. The station is served by regional services (TER Centre-Val de Loire) to Vierzon and Orléans. The station and its surroundings were renovated in 2018–2019. It sees 190,000 passengers a year.

Preceding station	Le Réseau Rémi	Following station
La Ferté-Saint-Aubin towards Orléans	1.2	Nouan-le-Fuzelier towards Vierzon
