= International Federation for Equestrian Sports =

International governing body of equestrian sports

Fédération équestre internationale
- Sport: Equestrian
- Category: Sports
- Jurisdiction: International
- Abbreviation: FEI
- Founded: 24 November 1921; 104 years ago in Paris
- Affiliation: International Olympic Committee; ASOIF
- Affiliation date: 1921, 1983
- Headquarters: Lausanne, Switzerland
- Location: HM King Hussein I Building, Chem. de la Joliette 8, 1006
- President: (Belgium) Ingmar De Vos
- Vice president(s): (Chinese Taipei) Jack C. Huang (Canada) Mark Samuel
- Secretary: (El Salvador) Sabrina Ibáñez
- Sponsor: Longines

Official website
- fei.org

The International Federation for Equestrian Sports (French: Fédération équestre internationale, FEI) is the international governing body of equestrian sports. The FEI came into being following the Olympic Congress in Lausanne (SUI) in 1921 from May 28 to May 30. Its headquarters are in Lausanne, Switzerland.

The FEI is responsible for drafting and enforcing regulations within the six disciplines under its jurisdiction. Besides regulation, overseeing all international competitions and Championships, overseeing and cooperating with all affiliated national federations, overseeing and educating officials and registering riders and horses are core tasks of the FEI. As an umbrella equestrian organisation, the FEI focuses on promoting equestrian sport, attracting and cooperating with sponsors, media and fans, and representing equestrian sport on various online and offline channels. An FEI code of conduct protects the welfare of the horses from physical abuse or doping.

== History ==
The Fédération Équestre Internationale (FEI) was founded in Paris on 24 November 1921 following discussions initiated at the Olympic Congress in Lausanne earlier that year. The organization was created to establish uniform international rules for equestrian competition and to oversee the growing number of international events in the Olympic disciplines of show jumping, dressage, and eventing. The founding member nations were Belgium, Denmark, France, Italy, Japan, Norway, Sweden, and the United States.

The creation of the FEI was closely linked to the inclusion of equestrian sport in the Olympic Games. During the early twentieth century, international competitions were conducted under varying national regulations, making it difficult to organize fair competition between riders from different countries. The FEI was established to provide a common framework for rules, officiating, and championship organization. In its early decades, the FEI was strongly influenced by military traditions, as most international riders were cavalry officers and Olympic participation was largely restricted to military personnel. Following the Second World War, the sport gradually opened to civilian competitors. A major milestone occurred at the 1952 Olympic Games, when restrictions on civilian participation were removed, allowing a broader range of athletes to compete internationally. Women’s participation also expanded during this period, first in dressage and later in jumping and eventing.

Throughout the second half of the twentieth century, the FEI experienced significant global growth. Membership expanded beyond its traditional European and North American base, reflecting the increasing popularity of equestrian sport worldwide. New disciplines were introduced under FEI governance, including driving, endurance, and vaulting, while para-equestrian sport was progressively integrated into the federation’s structure. In 1990, the FEI launched the World Equestrian Games, bringing together world championships in multiple FEI disciplines at a single venue. The event became one of the most important competitions in international equestrian sport and remained the primary world championship format until its restructuring in the 2020s.

During the twenty-first century, the FEI increasingly focused on horse welfare, integrity, anti-doping measures, sustainability, and the global development of equestrian sport. The federation strengthened its regulatory framework through the expansion of veterinary controls, athlete education programs, and governance reforms. By the 2020s, the FEI had grown into the international governing body for equestrian sport, representing more than 130 national federations and overseeing thousands of international competitions annually. Since 2014, the FEI has been led by Belgian administrator Ingmar De Vos, under whose presidency the organization has pursued modernization initiatives and expanded its emphasis on welfare, digital innovation, and global participation.

== Disciplines ==
The FEI recognizes six disciplines under global governance in both regular and para-equestrian competition: dressage and para-dressage, driving and para-driving, endurance, eventing, jumping, and vaulting. Reining was also governed as an FEI discipline from 2000 until 2021.

Two additional disciplines are recognized under regional governance: horseball (Fédération internationale de horse-ball – FIHB) and tent pegging (International Tent Pegging Federation – ITPF). The FEI does not govern horse racing—which is overseen by the International Federation of Horseracing Authorities (IFHA)—or polo, although it has signed a memorandum of understanding with the Federation of International Polo (FIP).

== Values ==
The FEI has stated their vision to be "To grow the unique and mutually beneficial bond between horse and human in sport globally."

The FEI has stated their mission to be "To drive and develop equestrian sport globally in a modern, sustainable and structured manner with guaranteed integrity, athlete welfare, equal opportunity and a fair and ethical partnership with the horse."

== Regions ==
As of 2026, the FEI recognized 135 affiliated national federations.

Europe — European Equestrian Federation
Member federations include Albania, Andorra, Austria, Belgium, Bulgaria, Croatia, Cyprus, Czech Republic, Denmark, Estonia, Finland, France, Germany, Great Britain, Greece, Hungary, Iceland, Israel, Italy, Ireland, Latvia, Liechtenstein, Lithuania, Luxembourg, Netherlands, North Macedonia, Norway, Malta, Monaco, Poland, Portugal, Romania, Slovenia, San Marino, Serbia, Slovakia, Spain, Sweden, Switzerland, Turkiye, and Ukraine.

North America and Caribbean – Group IV
This group includes Antigua and Barbuda, Bahamas, Barbados, Bermuda, Canada, Cayman Islands, Haiti, United States Virgin Islands, Jamaica, Trinidad and Tobago, and the United States.

Central America – Group V
Member federations are Colombia, Costa Rica, Cuba, Dominican Republic, El Salvador, Guatemala, Honduras, Mexico, Panama, Puerto Rico, and Venezuela.

South America – Group VI
This group comprises Argentina, Bolivia, Brazil, Chile, Ecuador, Paraguay, Peru, and Uruguay.

Middle East and North Africa – Group VII
Federations in this group include Algeria, Bahrain, Egypt, Iraq, Jordan, Saudi Arabia, Kuwait, Libya, Lebanon, Morocco, Oman, Palestine, Qatar, Sudan, Syria, Tunisia, the United Arab Emirates, and Yemen.

Asia and Oceania – Group VIII — Asian Equestrian Federation
Member nations include Australia, Brunei Darussalam, Cambodia, China, Hong Kong, Indonesia, India, Japan, South Korea, Malaysia, Mongolia, Myanmar, Nepal, New Zealand, North Korea, Pakistan, Philippines, Singapore, Sri Lanka, Thailand, and Chinese Taipei (Taiwan).

Africa – Group IX
This group includes Angola, Botswana, Congo Kinshasa, Côte d’Ivoire, Ethiopia, Kenya, Madagascar, Mauritius, Namibia, South Africa, Senegal, Esswatini, Zambia, and Zimbabwe.

Central Asia – Group EEA
Member federations are Armenia, Azerbaijan, Belarus, Georgia, Iran, Kazakhstan, Kyrgyzstan, Moldova, Russia, Turkmenistan, and Uzbekistan.

== Events ==
The FEI oversees and sanctions a range of international equestrian competitions, including Olympic disciplines, world championships, continental championships, and global World Cup series.

=== Olympic and Paralympic Games ===
The first Olympics held under its authority were in 1924. Jumping, Dressage and Eventing have been a part of the Olympics since 1912. Para-Equestrian Dressage has been part of the Paralympic games since 1996. Jumping has been part of the Youth Olympic Games since its creation in Singapore in 2010.

=== FEI World Equestrian Games ===
The FEI has organized the FEI World Equestrian Games every four years since 1990. The idea of the World Equestrian Games (WEG) came into being in the mid-1980s and was strongly supported by HRH Prince Philip, who was then FEI President. The WEG encompasses the World Championship titles in all the FEI global disciplines.

=== World Cup ===
The FEI World Cup is an indoor series and takes place throughout the world with qualifying leagues leading to a final in each of the disciplines. The FEI World Cup series began with show jumping in 1978 and has since been extended to the disciplines of dressage, driving, and vaulting. Main events include:

- Show Jumping World Cup (since 1978)
- Dressage World Cup (since 1985)
- Driving World Cup (since 2001)
- Eventing World Cup (2003–2012)
- Vaulting World Cup (since 2010)
- Endurance World Cup

=== Championships ===
FEI World, Continental and Regional Championships are held in most of the FEI disciplines.

- World
  - World Dressage Championships
  - World Eventing Championships
  - World Show Jumping Championships
  - World Driving Championships
  - Endurance World Championships
  - Vaulting World Championships
  - Para-dressage World Championships
  - Para-driving World Championships
- Continental
  - Europe
    - European Dressage Championships
    - European Show Jumping Championships
    - European Eventing Championships
    - European Para-Dressage Championships
  - Americas
    - Equestrian events at the Pan American Games
  - Asia
    - Equestrian events at the Asian Games

=== Ratings ===
- Concours de Saut International (jumping)
- Concours Complet International (eventing)
- Concours de Dressage International (dressage)

== Presidents ==
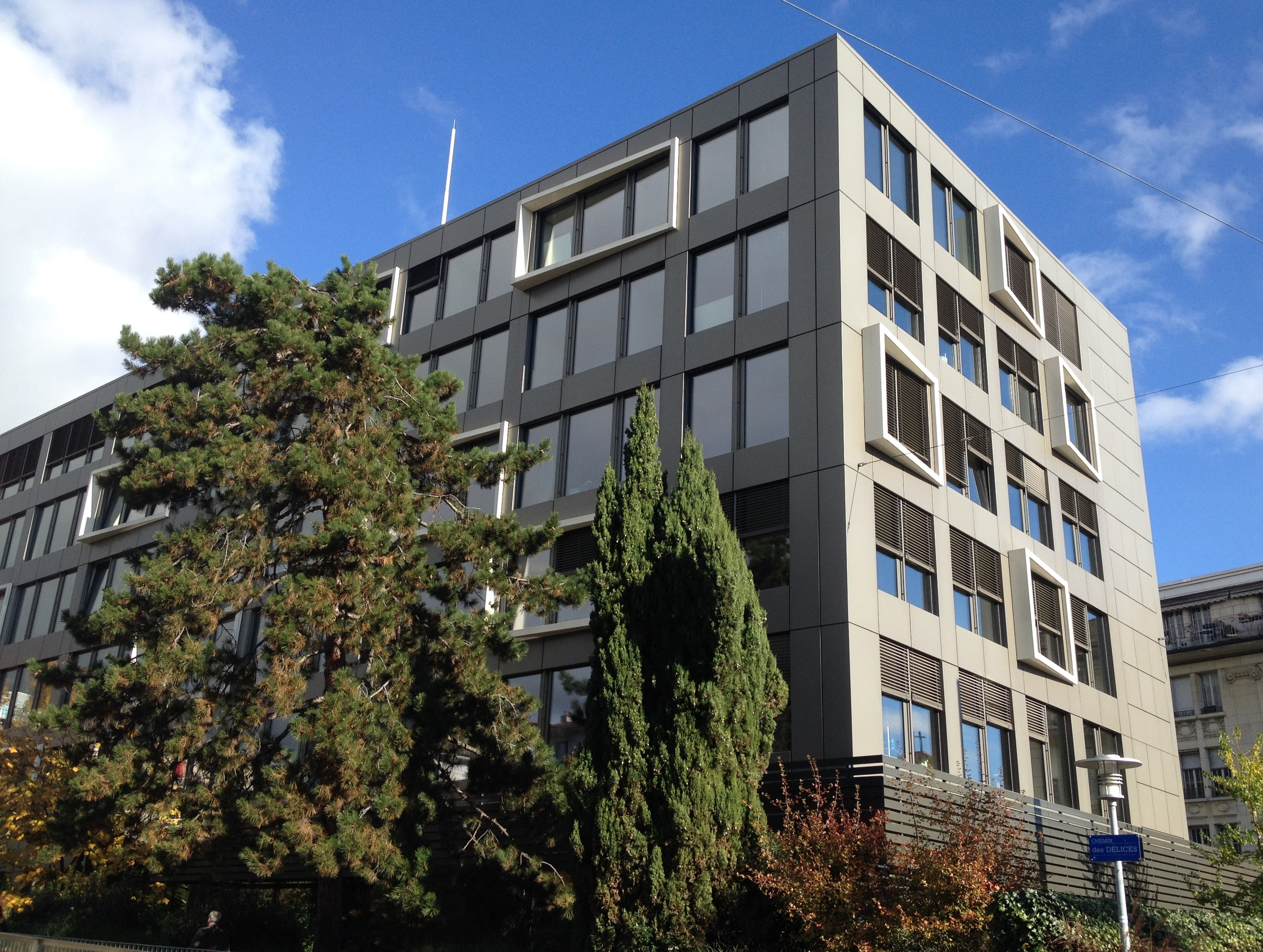
FEI headquarters in Lausanne, Switzerland

There have been 13 different presidents of the organization. Major Jhkr Karl F. Quarles van Ufford is the only individual to have served twice. A president can serve for a maximum of three terms. Since 2014, the president of the FEI has been Ingmar De Vos from Belgium.

#	President	Nation	Term
1	Baron du Teil	France	1921–1927
2	General Gerrit Johannes Maris	Netherlands	1927–1929
3	Major Jhkr Karl F. Quarles van Ufford	Netherlands	1929–1931
4	General Guy V. Henry	USA	1931–1935
5	Baron Max Von Holzing-Bertstett	Germany	1935–1936
6	Major Jhkr Karl F. Quarles van Ufford	Netherlands	1936–1939
7	Magnus Rydman	Finland	1939–1946
8	Baron Gaston de Trannoy	Belgium	1946–1954
9	Prince Bernhard of Lippe-Biesterfeld	Netherlands	1954–1964
10	Prince Philip, Duke of Edinburgh	UK	1964–1986
11	Anne, Princess Royal	UK	1986–1994
12	Infanta Pilar, Duchess of Badajoz	Spain	1994–2006
13	Princess Haya bint Hussein	Jordan	2006–2014
14	Ingmar De Vos	Belgium	Since 2014
