= Turkish Equestrian Federation =

- Abbreviation: TBF
- Formation: 1923
- Headquarters: Çankaya, Ankara, Turkey
- Members: 1933
- President: Hasan Engin Tuncer
- Affiliations: International Federation for Equestrian Sports
- Website: https://www.binicilik.org.tr/

The Turkish Equestrian Federation is the governing sport association for equestrian sports in Turkey,

Founded in 1923, the federation has been affiliated with the International Federation for Equestrian Sports since 1932. Since 7 November 2016 its president has been Atıf Bülent Bora the vice presidents are Osman Kılıç and Hilmi Yaman, and the secretary general is Recep Kaan Başoğlu.
