= Federación Dominicana de Deportes Ecuestres =

Governing body for equestrian in the Dominican Republic

Dominican Federation of Equestrian Sports
- Federación Dominicana de Deportes Ecuestres
- Sport: Equestrian
- Jurisdiction: Dominican Republic
- Abbreviation: FDDE
- Founded: 1955
- Affiliation: FEI
- Affiliation date: 1979
- Headquarters: Centro Ecuestre Palmarejo
- Location: Palmarejo-Villa Linda
- President: José Manuel Ramos Báez
- Vice president: Mercedes Gassó
- Secretary: Liliana Ramírez
- (Dominican Republic)

The Dominican Republic Equestrian Federation is the national governing body for equestrian sports in the Dominican Republic, its president is José Manuel Ramos Báez.

The Federation is affiliated with the national Olympic Committee since 1974 has official relations with the International Federation for Equestrian Sports (FEI), since 1979 and ratified in 2009

== Affiliations ==
- International Equestrian Federation FEI
- Dominican Republic Olympic Committee

== See also ==
- Sport in the Dominican Republic
