= South African Equestrian Federation =

Sports governing body in South Africa

- Sport: Equestrian
- Jurisdiction: South Africa
- Abbreviation: SAEF
- Founded: 1947
- Affiliation: FEI
- Affiliation date: 1947
- Headquarters: Johannesburg
- Location: The Equidome, 475 Papenfus Road, Beaulieu Country Estate, Johannesburg.
- President: Adv. Willem Edeling
- Secretary: Wessel Strauss

Official website
- www.saef.org.za
- (South Africa)

South African Equestrian Federation (SAEF) is the national governing body for majority of equestrian sports in South Africa. These sports include the FEI-recognized disciplines of dressage, eventing, show jumping, vaulting, endurance, reining, para-equestrian, and driving, with the non-FEI discipline of tentpegging. SAEF also develops and enforces the rules for other events at horse shows.

SAEF governs the official relations with the International Federation for Equestrian Sports (FEI), with its affiliation established since 1947. It also oversee the interactions between the South African government with equestrian athletes and professionals. SAEF is registered with SASCOC as the officially recognised federation.

== Disciplines ==
Disciplines affiliated under the SAEF include:

- Carriage Driving SA
- Dressage South Africa
- Endurance Association of SA
- Eventing South Africa
- Mounted Archery SA
- Equitation SA
- Mounted Games SA
- SA Polo Association
- SA Polocrosse Association
- SA Showjumping
- SA Tentpegging Association
- SA Western Mounted Games
- SA Showing
- SA Vaulting Association

== See also ==
- Sport in South Africa
