= Nouan-le-Fuzelier =

- Commune
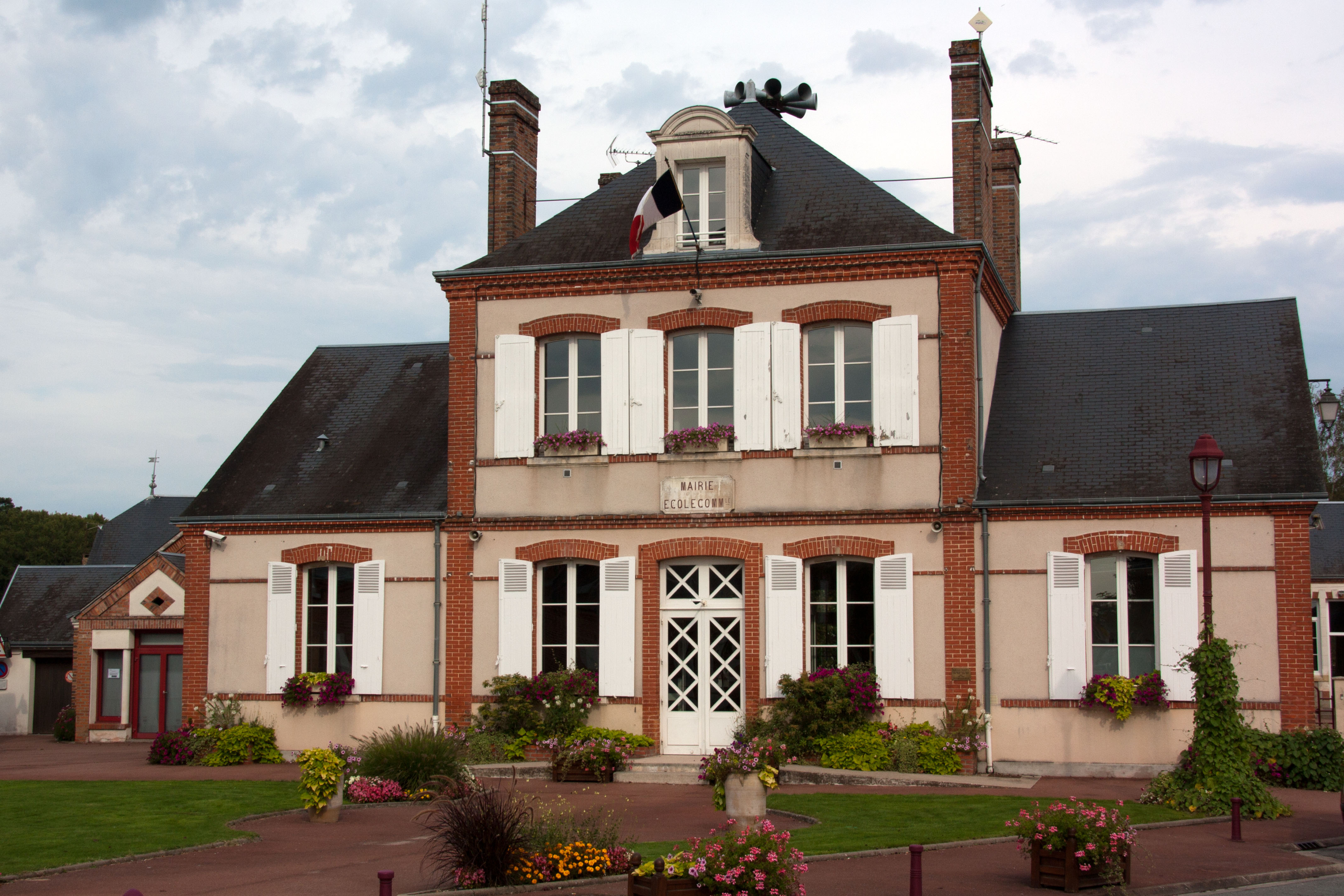
- Town hall

- Coat of arms
- Location of Nouan-le-Fuzelier
- Location within France Location within Centre-Val de Loire
- Coordinates: 47°32′15″N 2°02′19″E
- Country: France
- Region: Centre-Val de Loire
- Department: Loir-et-Cher
- Arrondissement: Romorantin-Lanthenay
- Canton: La Sologne
- Intercommunality: Cœur de Sologne

Government
  - Mayor (2020–2026): Patrick Lunet
- Area^{1}: 85.49 km^{2} (33.01 sq mi)
- Highest elevation: 138 m (453 ft)
- Lowest elevation: 99 m (325 ft)
- Population (2023): 2,272
  - Density: 26.58/km^{2} (68.83/sq mi)
- Time zone: UTC+01:00 (CET)
  - Summer (DST): UTC+02:00 (CEST)
- INSEE/Postal code: 41161 /41600
- ^{1} French Land Register data, which excludes lakes, ponds, glaciers > 1 km^{2} (0.386 sq mi or 247 acres) and river estuaries.

Nouan-le-Fuzelier (French pronunciation: [nwɑ̃ lə fyzlje]) is a commune in the Loir-et-Cher department of central France. Nouan-le-Fuzelier station has rail connections to Orléans and Vierzon.

== Population ==
Historical population

Year	Pop.	±% p.a.
1793	1,012	—
1821	1,220	+0.67%
1846	1,501	+0.83%
1872	1,720	+0.53%
1901	2,082	+0.66%
1926	2,007	−0.15%
1946	1,780	−0.60%
1962	1,845	+0.22%
1968	1,948	+0.91%

Year	Pop.	±% p.a.
1975	2,159	+1.48%
1982	2,301	+0.91%
1990	2,274	−0.15%
1999	2,319	+0.22%
2007	2,555	+1.22%
2012	2,362	−1.56%
2017	2,326	−0.31%
2023	2,272	−0.39%

Source: EHESS and INSEE (1968-2023)

== See also ==
- Communes of the Loir-et-Cher department
