= Federal Equestrian Park =

Park in France

Parc équestre fédéral
- Federal Equestrian Park
- Interactive map of Parc équestre fédéral
- Former names: Parc équestre national (1994-2000)
- Location: Parc équestre fédéral Lamotte-Beuvron, France
- Coordinates: 47°36′14″N 2°00′37″E
- Operator: Fédération française d'équitation
- Field size: 400 hectares

Construction
- Opened: 1994

The Federal Equestrian Park (Parc Équestre Fédéral in French) is an equestrian center situated next to Lamotte-Beuvron, in the Loir-et-Cher department in France. It hosts a number of international events, including the Generali Open de France.
