= Lamotte-Beuvron =

- Commune
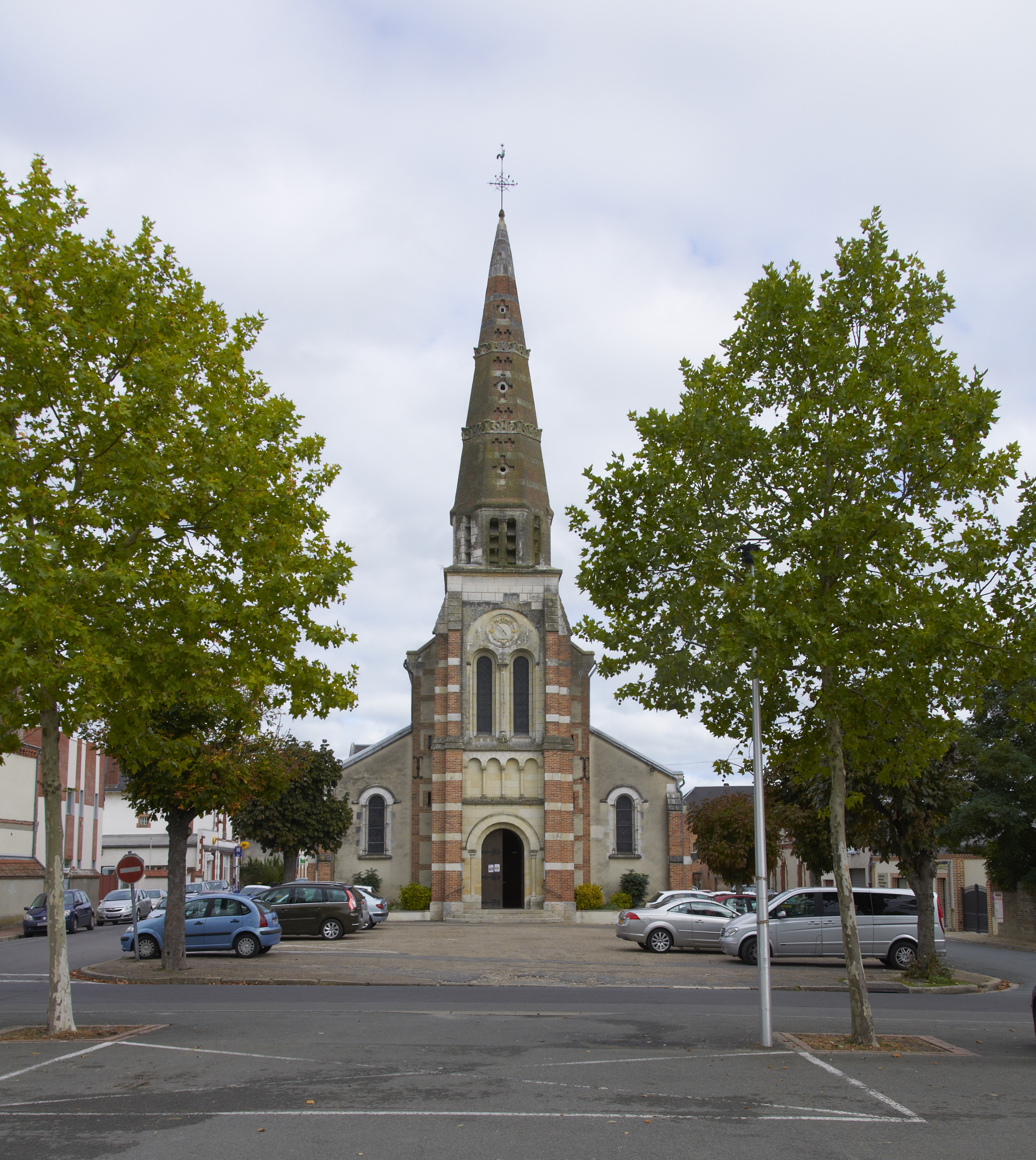
- Sainte-Anne church

- Coat of arms
- Location of Lamotte-Beuvron
- Location within France Location within Centre-Val de Loire
- Coordinates: 47°36′10″N 2°01′32″E
- Country: France
- Region: Centre-Val de Loire
- Department: Loir-et-Cher
- Arrondissement: Romorantin-Lanthenay
- Canton: La Sologne
- Intercommunality: Cœur de Sologne

Government
  - Mayor (2020–2026): Pascal Bioulac
- Area^{1}: 23.34 km^{2} (9.01 sq mi)
- Highest elevation: 146 m (479 ft)
- Lowest elevation: 106 m (348 ft)
- Population (2023): 4,504
  - Density: 193.0/km^{2} (499.8/sq mi)
- Time zone: UTC+01:00 (CET)
  - Summer (DST): UTC+02:00 (CEST)
- INSEE/Postal code: 41106 /41600
- ^{1} French Land Register data, which excludes lakes, ponds, glaciers > 1 km^{2} (0.386 sq mi or 247 acres) and river estuaries.

Lamotte-Beuvron (French pronunciation: [lamɔt bøvʁɔ̃]) is a town and commune of about 5000 inhabitants in the Loir-et-Cher department of Centre-Val de Loire, France.

The French Federal Equestrian Park, one of the largest in Europe, is based in Lamotte-Beuvron. Each July, the Federal Equestrian Park hosts the French Pony Championship, in which more than 15,000 participants compete. It also houses the permanent offices of the French Equestrian Federation and, since 2009, the Bureau of the National Association of the French Riding Pony.

The town is the birthplace of the Tarte Tatin dessert, an upside-down apple pastry named after the Tatin sisters, who created it at their Hôtel Tatin, across the street from the Lamotte-Beuvron railway station.

Lamotte-Beuvron's motto is "Hill yesterday, Mountain tomorrow" (« Motte hier, Mont demain ») which expresses the confidence of the residents in the expansion of the city.

Lamotte-Beuvron is the "sister city" of Paris, Kentucky in the United States.

== Geography ==
Lamotte-Beuvron is located in the natural region of Sologne on the banks of the Beuvron river, about 30 km south of Orléans. It is in the heart of "Grande Sologne," a forested area stretching over 1,930 square miles and containing hundreds of ponds, making the region a popular destination for hunting and fishing. Sologne is one of the richest regions in France in big game (including deer and wild boar) and game birds (including pheasants, doves and pigeons, and woodcocks).

Lamotte-Beuvron station has rail connections to Orléans and Vierzon.

== Population ==
Historical population

Year	Pop.	±% p.a.
1793	346	—
1821	486	+1.22%
1846	769	+1.85%
1872	1,680	+3.05%
1901	2,285	+1.07%
1926	2,626	+0.56%
1946	3,421	+1.33%
1962	3,703	+0.50%
1968	4,073	+1.60%

Year	Pop.	±% p.a.
1975	4,475	+1.35%
1982	4,345	−0.42%
1990	4,247	−0.28%
1999	4,251	+0.01%
2007	4,581	+0.94%
2012	4,782	+0.86%
2017	4,724	−0.24%
2023	4,504	−0.79%

Source: EHESS and INSEE (1968-2023)

== Gallery ==
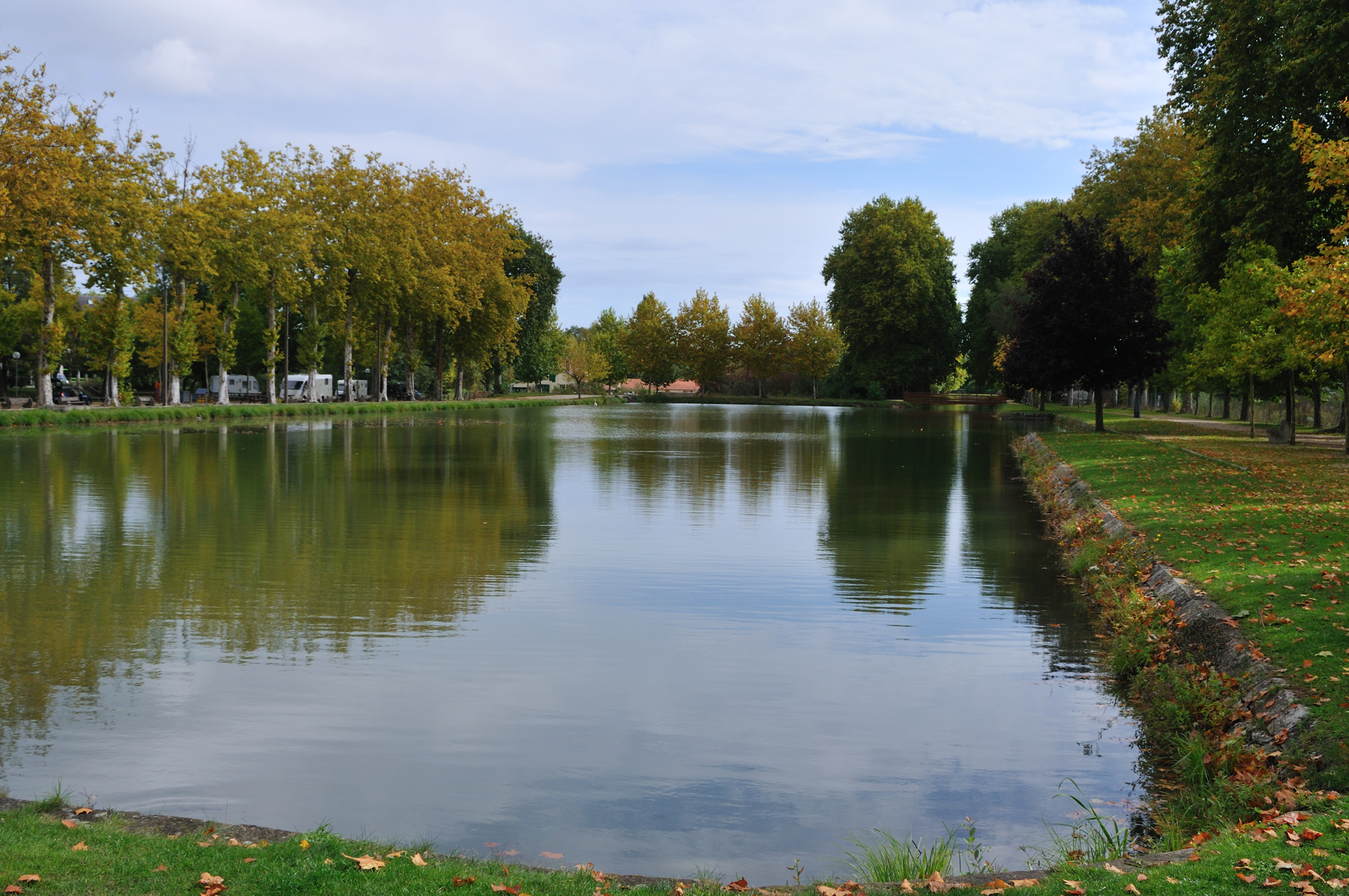
The channel of the Sauldre.

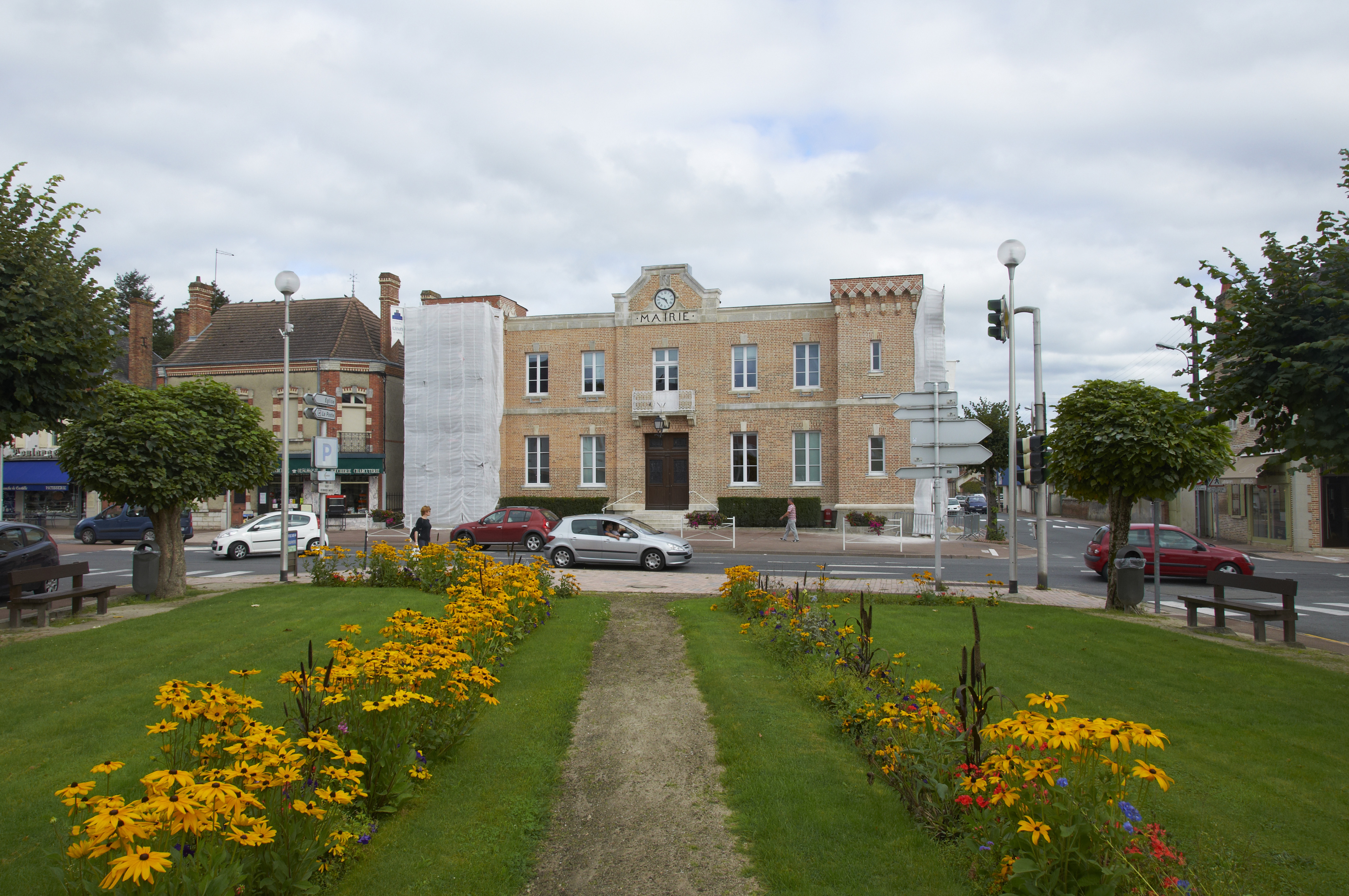
Town hall.

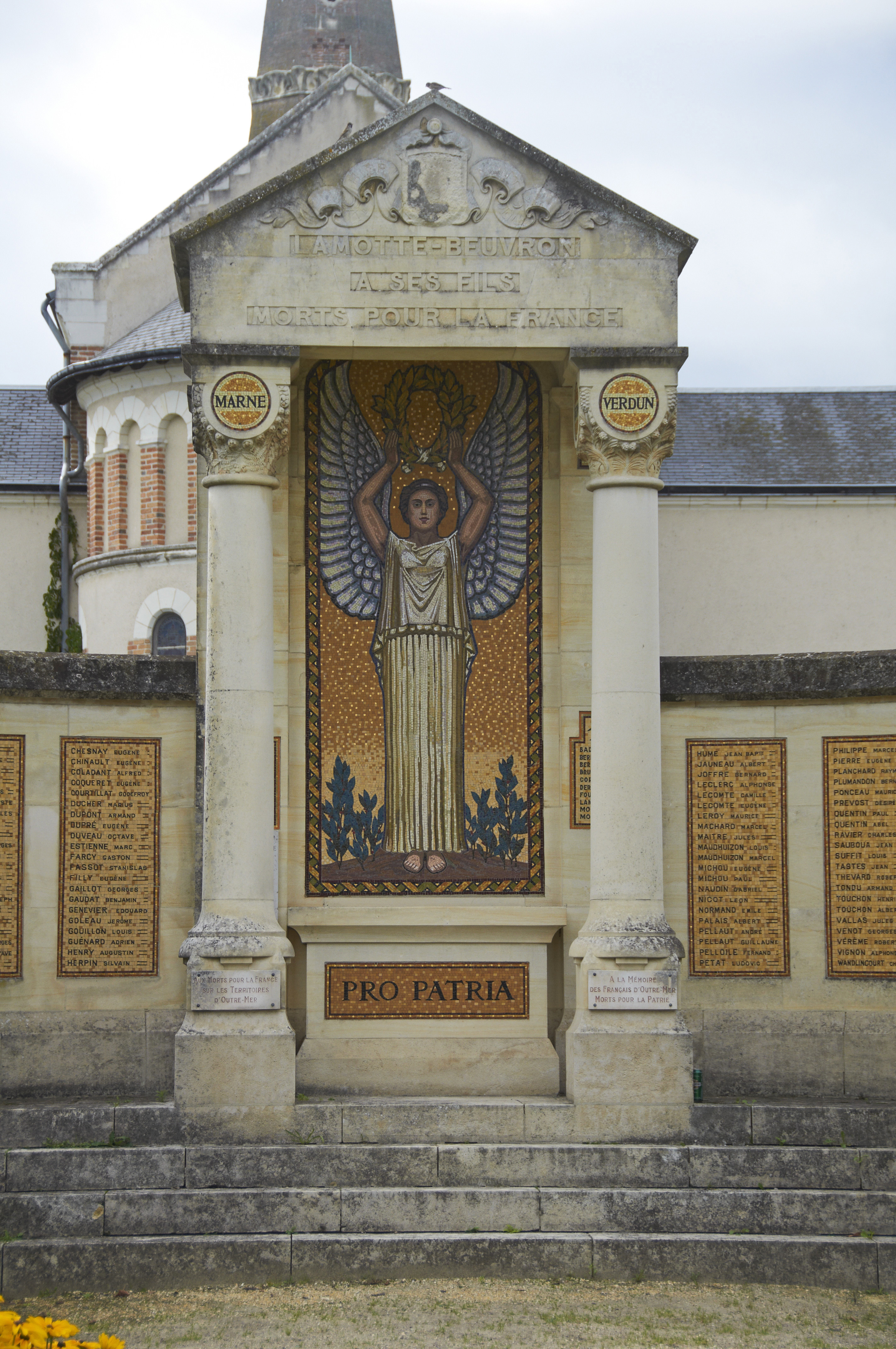
War memorial

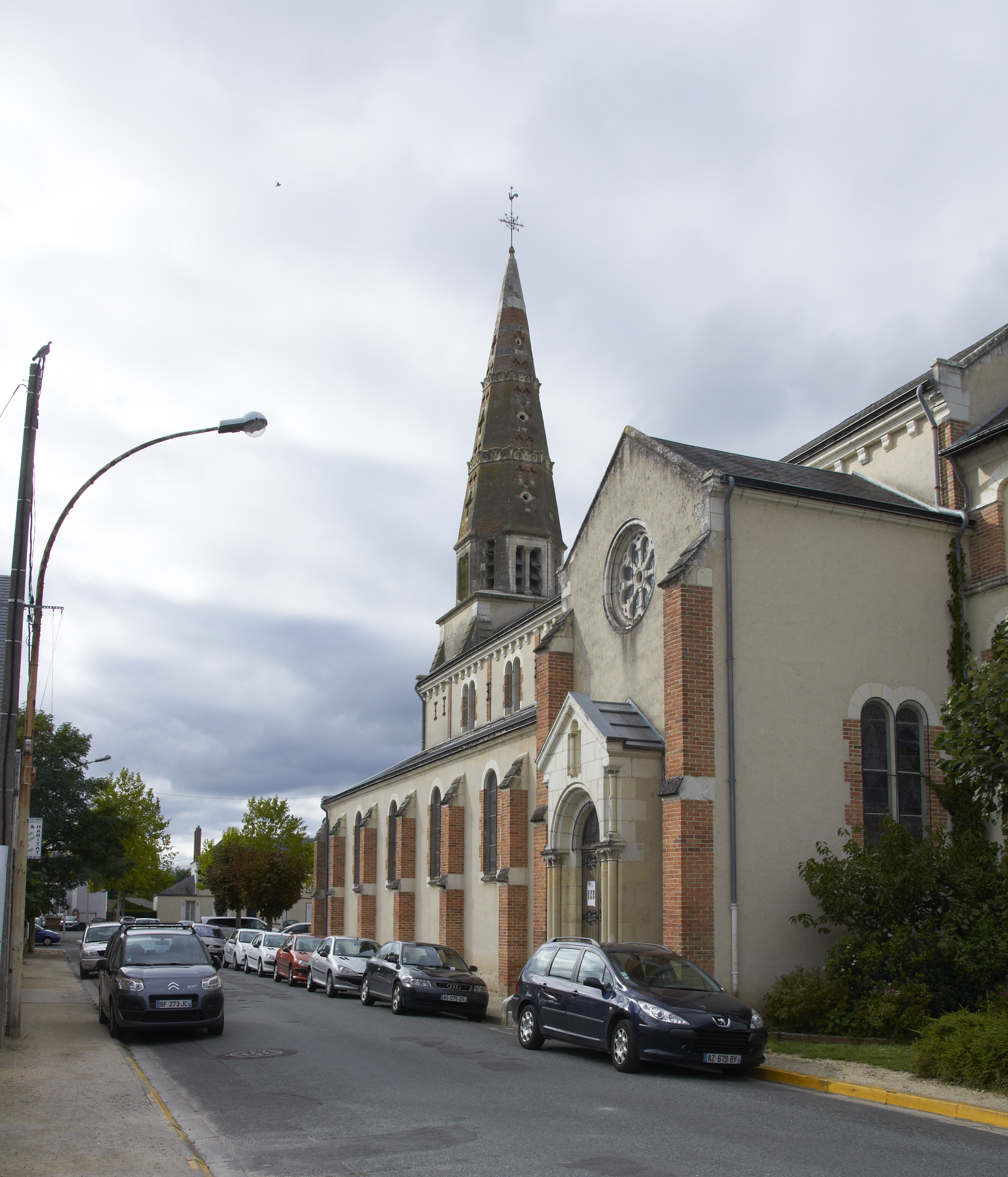
Sainte-Anne church

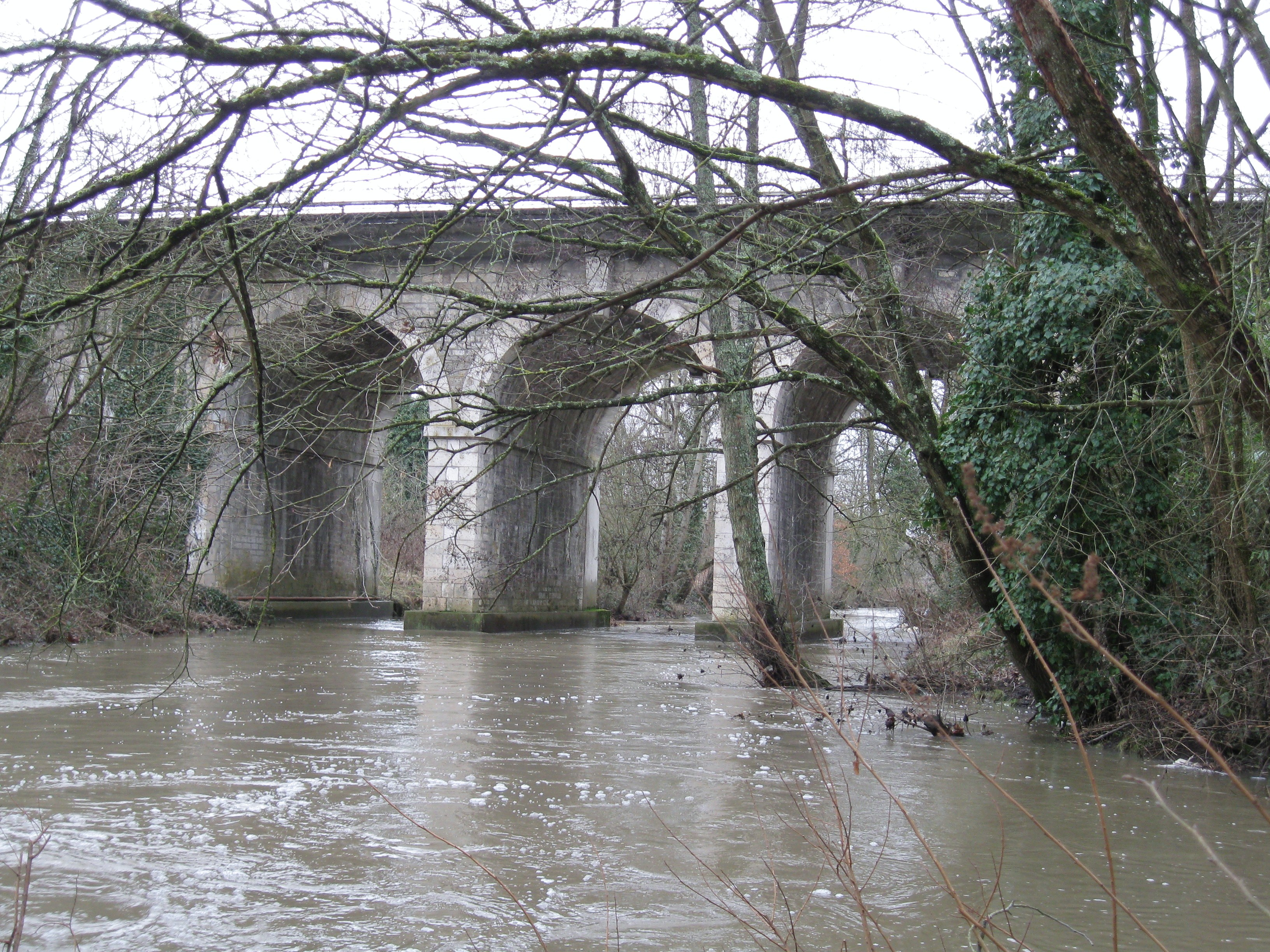
Railway bridge on the Beuvron

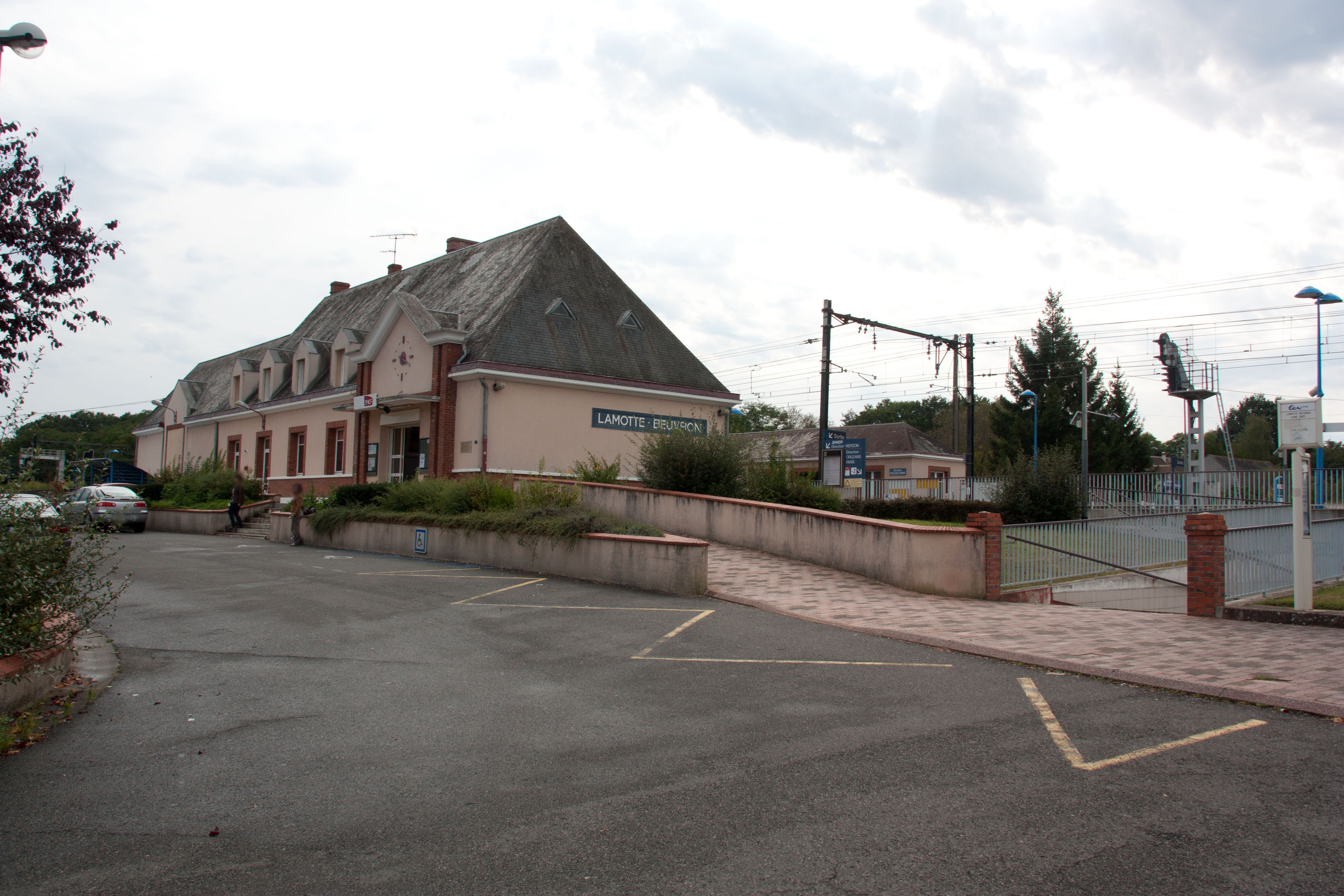
Lamotte-Beuvron railway station

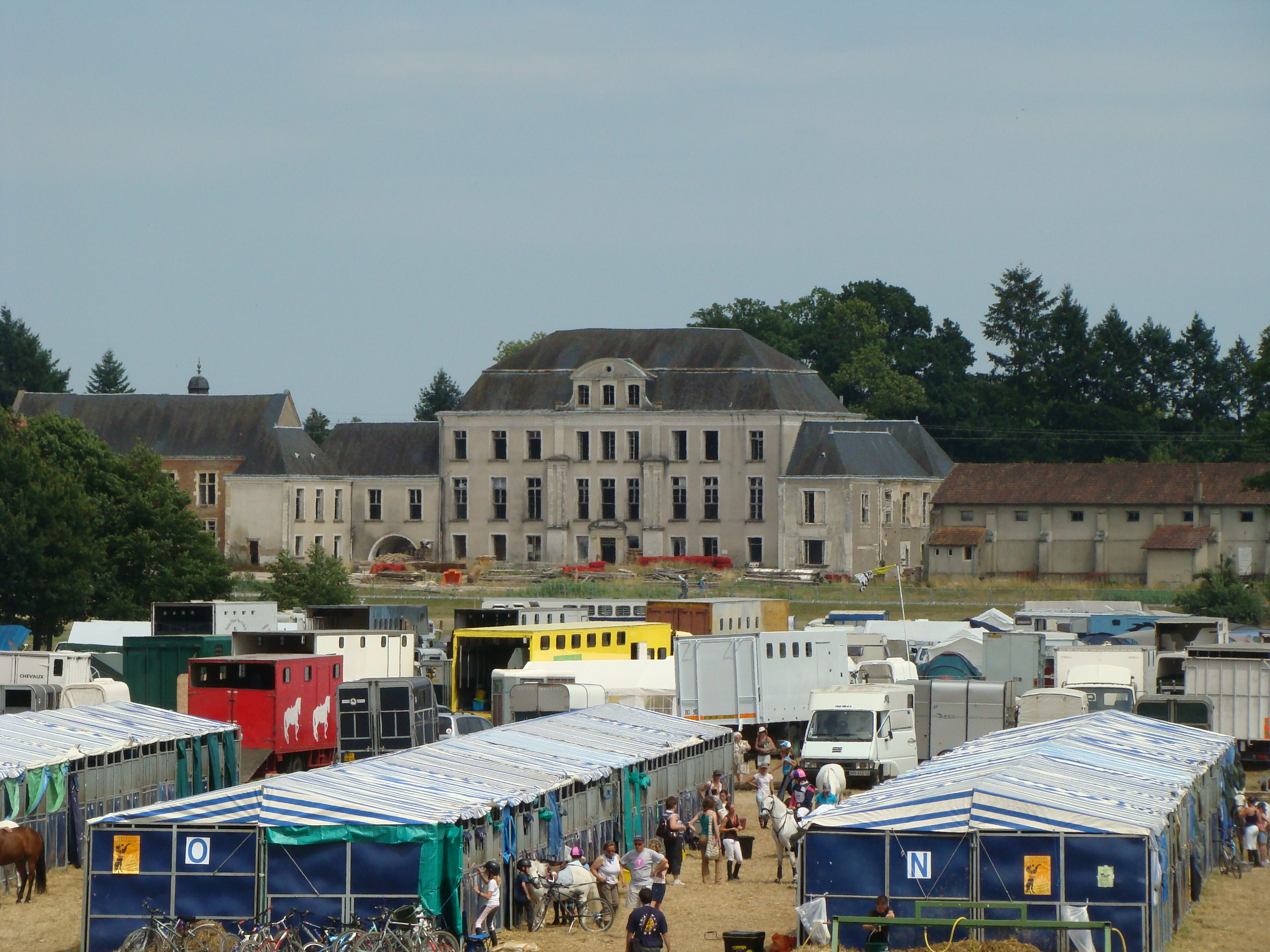
Castle Saint-Maurice

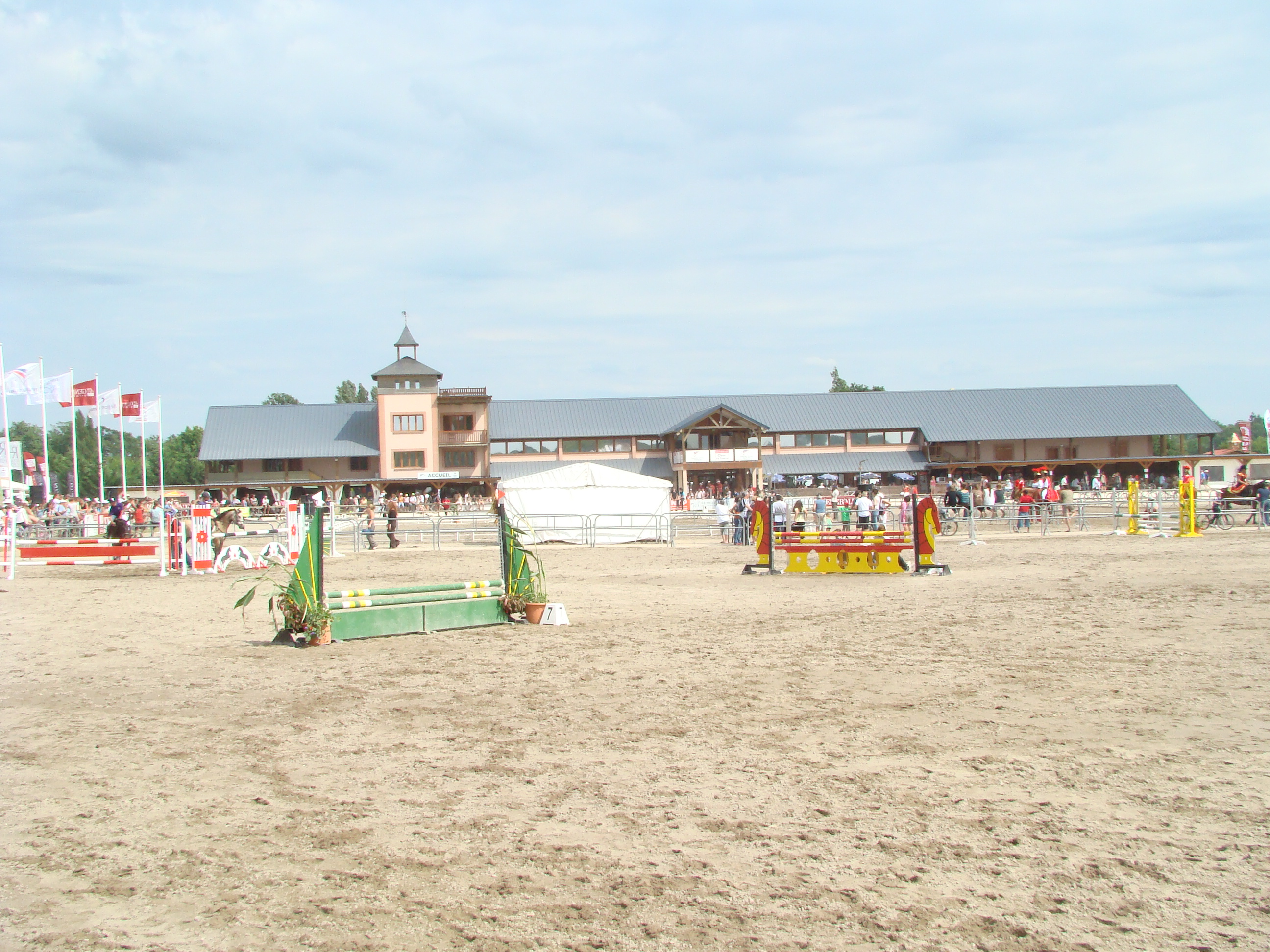
Federal Equestrian Park

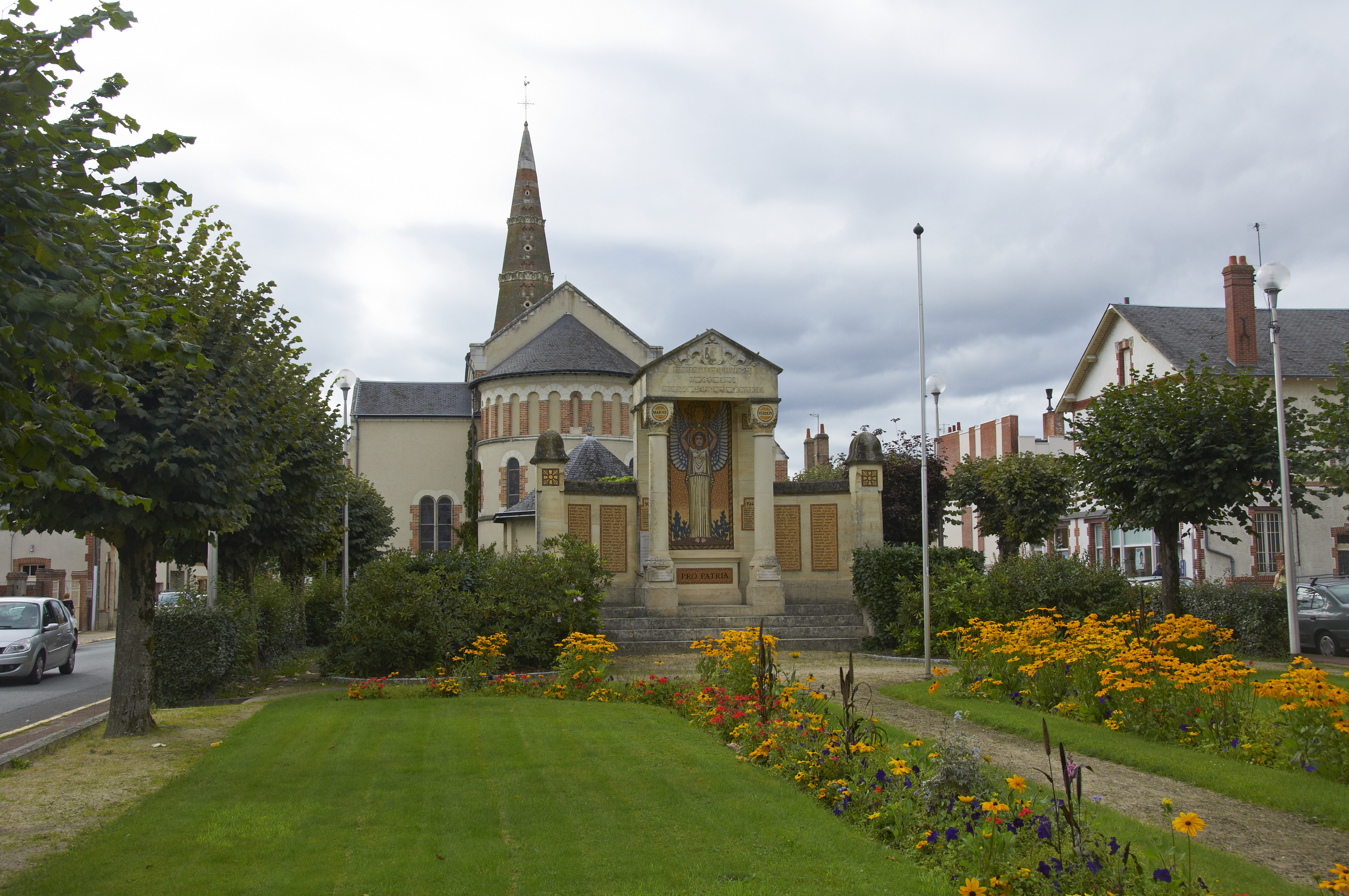
War memorial and Sainte-Anne church

== Climate ==
Climate data for Lamotte-Beuvron (1991–2020 normals, extremes 1978–present)
Month	Jan	Feb	Mar	Apr	May	Jun	Jul	Aug	Sep	Oct	Nov	Dec	Year
Record high °C (°F)	18.0 (64.4)	24.3 (75.7)	26.2 (79.2)	31.0 (87.8)	34.0 (93.2)	38.3 (100.9)	41.8 (107.2)	42.0 (107.6)	35.8 (96.4)	30.8 (87.4)	23.0 (73.4)	20.0 (68.0)	42.0 (107.6)
Mean daily maximum °C (°F)	7.8 (46.0)	9.3 (48.7)	13.6 (56.5)	17.0 (62.6)	20.7 (69.3)	24.2 (75.6)	26.6 (79.9)	26.7 (80.1)	22.5 (72.5)	17.3 (63.1)	11.5 (52.7)	8.1 (46.6)	17.1 (62.8)
Daily mean °C (°F)	4.5 (40.1)	5.0 (41.0)	8.2 (46.8)	10.9 (51.6)	14.6 (58.3)	18.0 (64.4)	20.1 (68.2)	19.8 (67.6)	16.1 (61.0)	12.4 (54.3)	7.7 (45.9)	4.9 (40.8)	11.8 (53.2)
Mean daily minimum °C (°F)	1.3 (34.3)	0.7 (33.3)	2.8 (37.0)	4.7 (40.5)	8.6 (47.5)	11.9 (53.4)	13.6 (56.5)	13.0 (55.4)	9.6 (49.3)	7.4 (45.3)	4.0 (39.2)	1.8 (35.2)	6.6 (43.9)
Record low °C (°F)	−20.5 (−4.9)	−15.0 (5.0)	−13.0 (8.6)	−6.7 (19.9)	−2.0 (28.4)	0.2 (32.4)	4.0 (39.2)	3.5 (38.3)	0.0 (32.0)	−5.1 (22.8)	−12.0 (10.4)	−14.8 (5.4)	−20.5 (−4.9)
Average precipitation mm (inches)	66.4 (2.61)	58.5 (2.30)	56.5 (2.22)	60.4 (2.38)	71.5 (2.81)	52.7 (2.07)	60.8 (2.39)	55.4 (2.18)	54.7 (2.15)	73.0 (2.87)	77.0 (3.03)	81.3 (3.20)	768.2 (30.24)
Average precipitation days (≥ 1.0 mm)	12.8	10.9	10.0	10.0	10.0	8.2	8.0	7.5	8.4	10.6	12.1	12.8	121.2
Source: Meteociel

== See also ==
- Tarte Tatin
- Communes of the Loir-et-Cher department
- The works of Jean Fréour Sculptures in St Anne's church
