= Argenton-sur-Creuse station =

Railway station in Argenton-sur-Creuse, France

Argenton-sur-Creuse
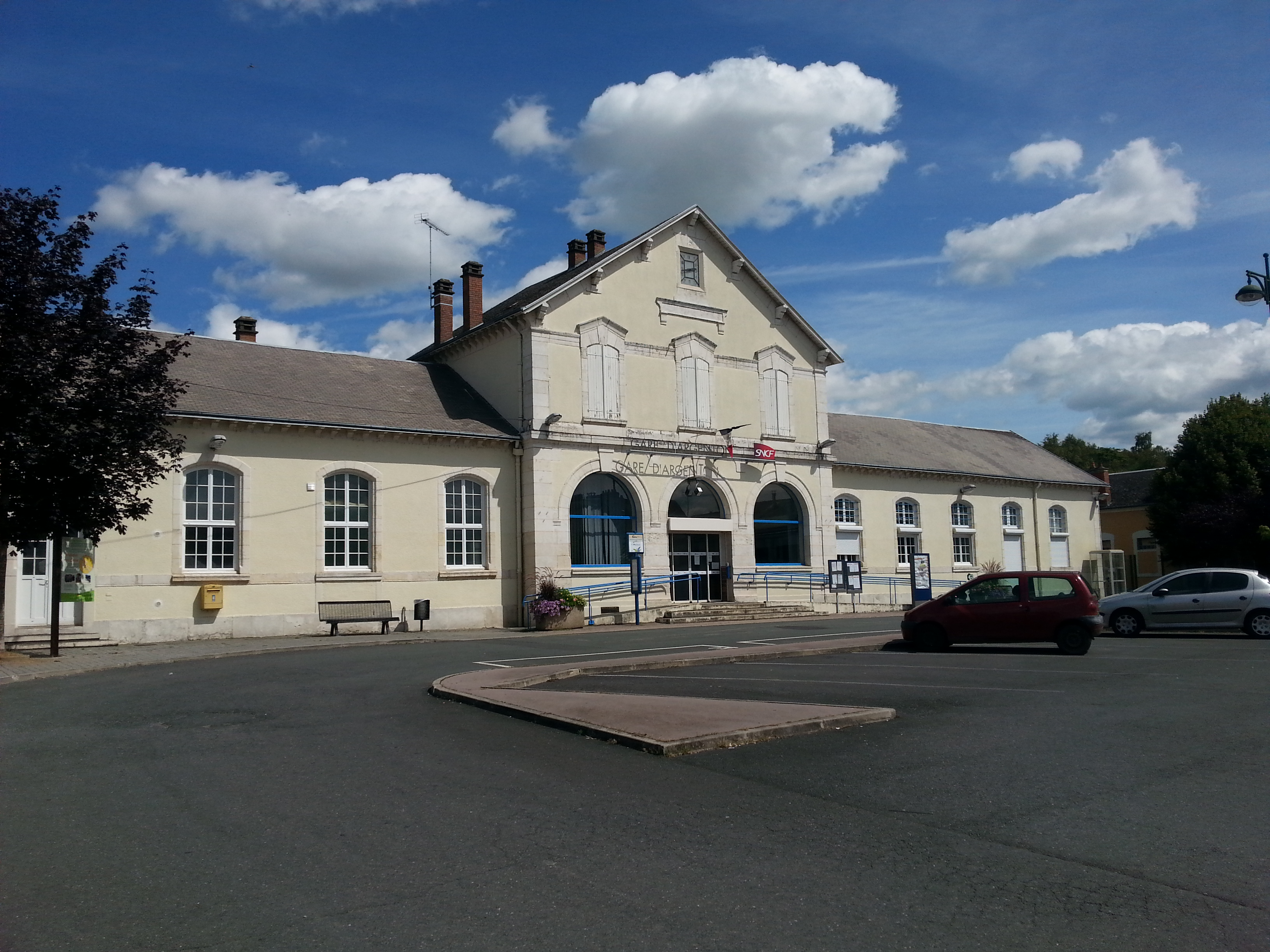

General information
- Location: Rue de la Gare; 36200 Argenton-sur-Creuse; France
- Coordinates: 46.5923°N 1.5183°E
- Elevation: 110 m (360 ft)
- Owner: SNCF
- Operator: SNCF
- Lines: Orléans–Montauban railway; Port-de-Piles à Argenton-sur-Creuse; Argenton-sur-Creuse à La Chaussée (HS); Le Blanc à Argenton-sur-Creuse via Saint-Benoît-du-Sault (1 m, HS)
- Platforms: 2
- Tracks: 3 + 1 Industrial spur + sidings
- Connections: Rémi J, K, L, N Autocars TER Centre-Val de Loire 1.3

Other information
- Station code: 87597120

Passengers
- 2019: 153,723 passengers

Services
Preceding station	SNCF	Following station
Châteauroux towards Paris-Austerlitz	Intercités	La Souterraine towards Toulouse
Preceding station	Le Réseau Rémi	Following station
Chabenet towards Vierzon	1.3	Éguzon towards Limoges
Location

Argenton-sur-Creuse station (French: Gate d'Argenton-Sur-Creuse) is a railway station in France on the Orléans–Montauban railway, located within the commune of Argenton-sur-Creuse, in the département of Indre, in the Centre-Val de Loire region. It is an SNCF train station served by trains of the Intercités and TER Centre-Val de Loire networks.

== Location ==
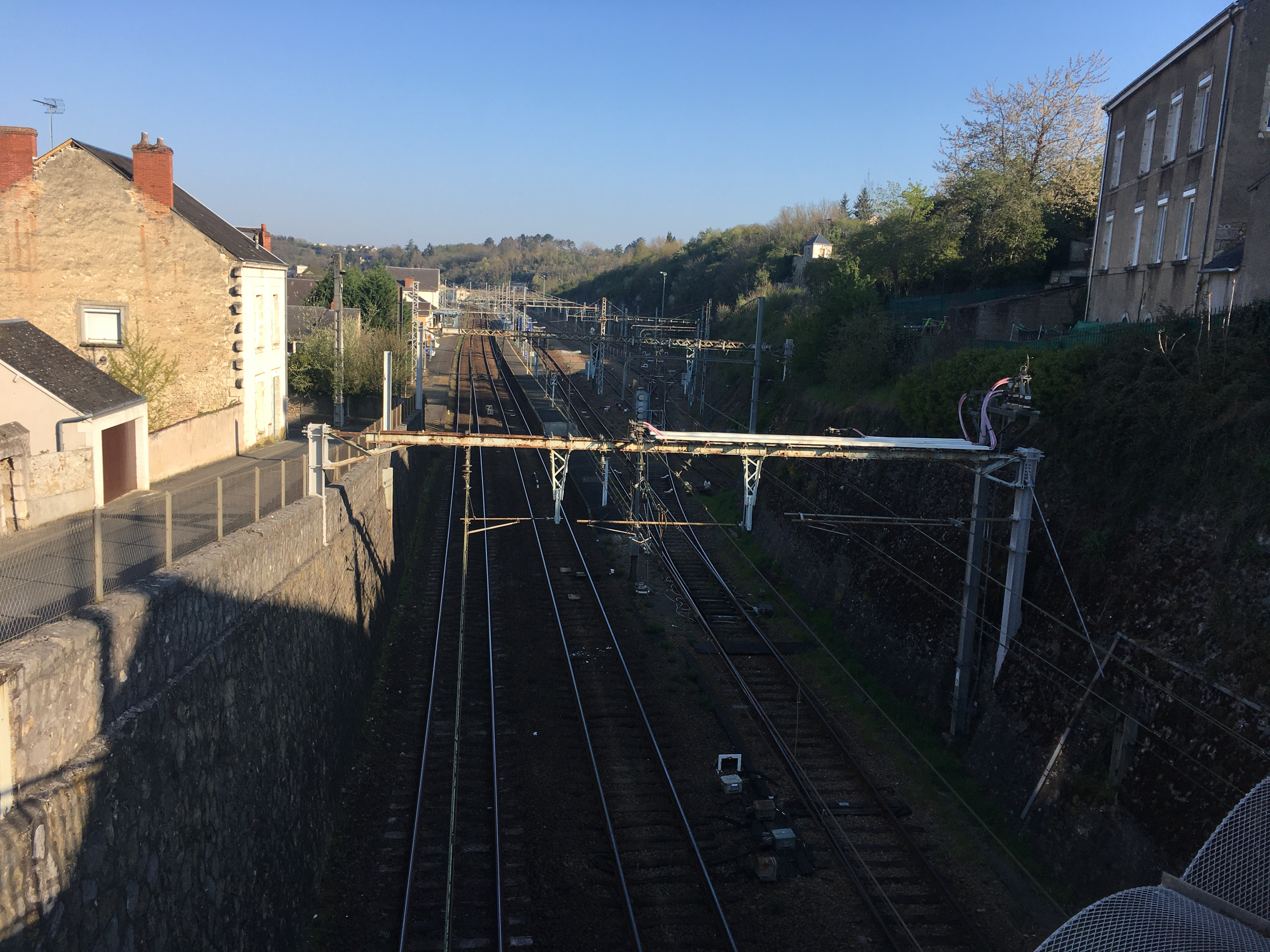
Overview of the station

At an altitude of 110 metres, Argenton-sur-Creuse railway station is located at 295.055 km along Orléans-Montauban railway line, between the stations of Chabenet and Éguzon.

A former junction station, it was also the origin of the abandoned Argenton-sur-Creuse - La Chaussée railway towards La Châtre and the terminus of the partially abandoned Port-de-Piles - Argenton-sur-Creuse line. Until 1938, it was also the terminus of a light metre-gauge railway line (Le Blanc - Argenton-sur-Creuse via Saint-Benoît-du-Sault), which opened in 1904.

== History ==
The station was inaugurated on May 1, 1854.

In 1888, the station's revenue was 575,075 francs.

On June 6, 1915, at half past midnight, a freight train pulling 39 wagons from Limoges lost control near Celon and ended up crashing into a manoeuvring train at Argenton station. The destructed wagons chaotically piled up in the Saint-Paul bridge cutting and the train's food product load spread as far as the rue Gambetta. Trains would not begin circulating again until June 10.

On the morning of June 9, 1944, the train station became the location of a skirmish between a German military detachment and a group of French Resistance fighters led by Colonel Roland Despains. This skirmish, won by the Résistance, was followed by the Argenton-sur-Creuse massacre. Over the course of the day, a number of railway workers and passengers were killed, injured, or taken hostage, despite the intercessions of the stationmaster, M. Vautrin, who spoke German and played an important role in saving as many of his staff as possible on a number of occasions.

On August 31, 1985, a Corail train from Paris-Austerlitz to Port-Bou derailed just after the station, because of excessive speed. The speed limit had been set at 40 km/h due to work on the lines. The train was passing at roughly 100 km/h when emergency breaking was triggered, causing a many of the carriages to derail. In particular, two of these carriages spilt over onto the adjacent tracks. This, at the same time a postal train from Brive-la-Gaillarde going towards Paris in the opposite direction arrived. The locomotive of the latter planted itself into the two overhanging carriages. The accident caused 43 fatalities. It was caused by an overlaying of signals making it difficult to understand which signals were to be used by the driver.

=== Frequentation ===
Passenger numbers for the station are detailed in the table below:

== Facilities ==
=== Reception ===
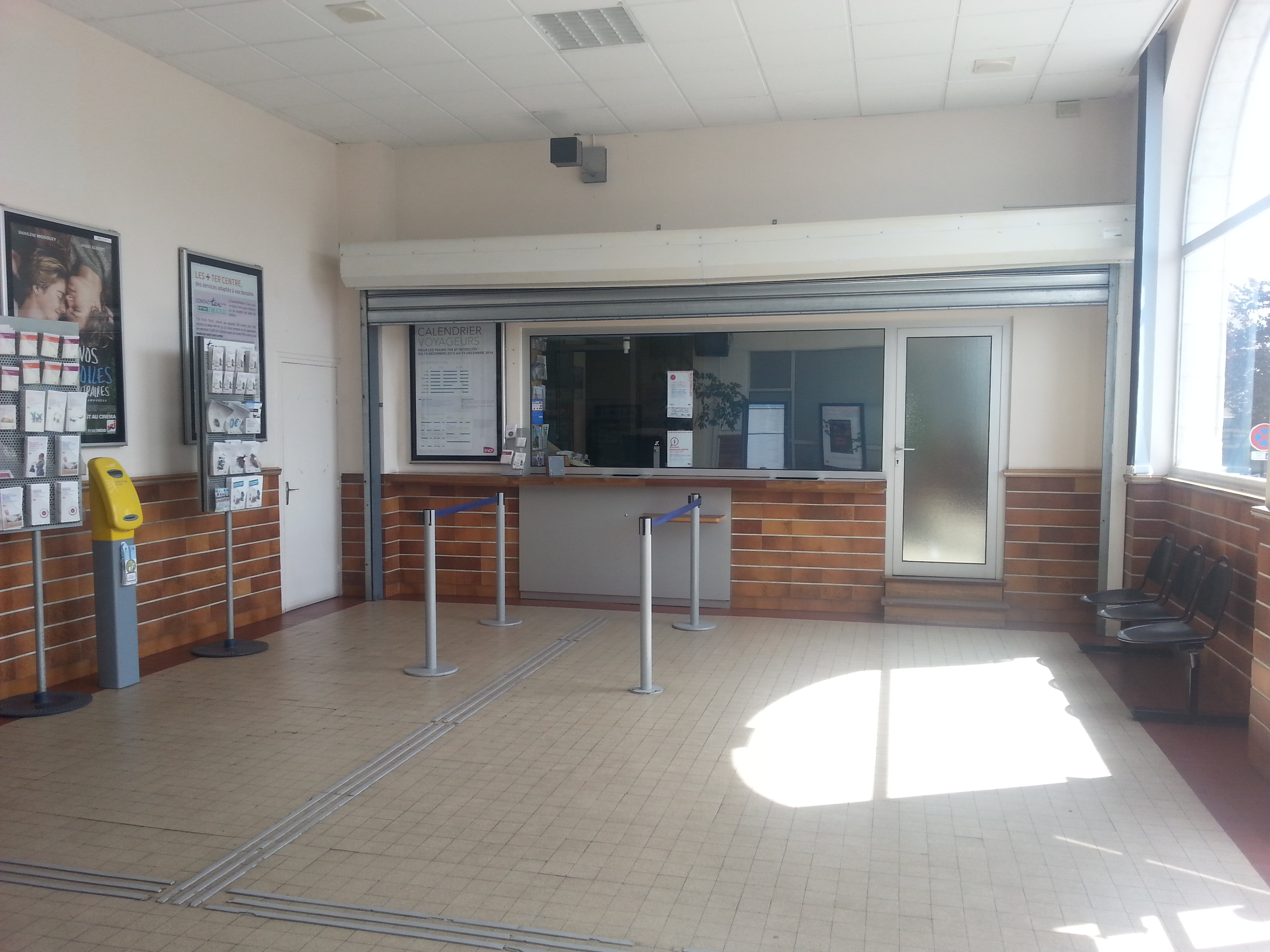
Inside the ticket hall, facing the ticket office

An SNCF station, Argenton station features a main hall, ticket office, automated ticket machines, a heated waiting area with seating, a platform-side waiting area with sheltered seating, toilets, a phone box and mailbox.

The station features a side platform (Platform 1) of 480 m in length overlooking track 2 and an island platform (Platform 2), 432 metres long, which overlooks tracks A and 1. Access to the island platform is ensured by an underground walkway.

There are also a number of sidings.

=== Services ===
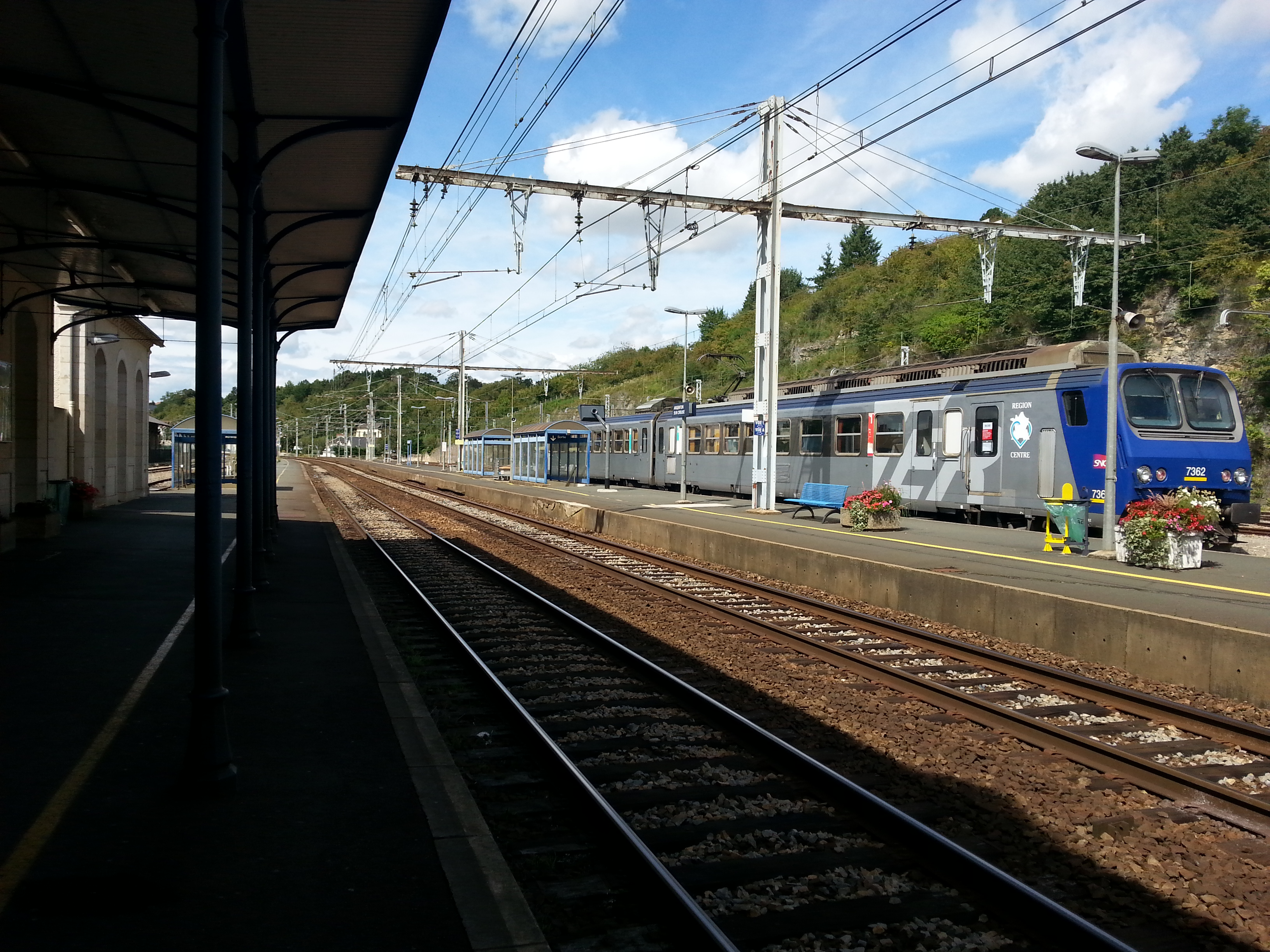
Z 7362 at the platform.

Argenton-sur-Creuse is served by Intercité trains travelling between Paris, Limoges and Toulouse. These services are powered by SNCF Class BB 26000 electric locomotives pulling Corail carriages.

At the regional level, Argenton-sur-Creuse is served by TER Centre-Val de Loire trains operating between Orléans, Vierzon, Châteauroux and Limoges. These routes are served by SNCF Classes Z 7300 and B 81500, as well as Class Z 21500 trains on occasion.

=== Onward travel ===
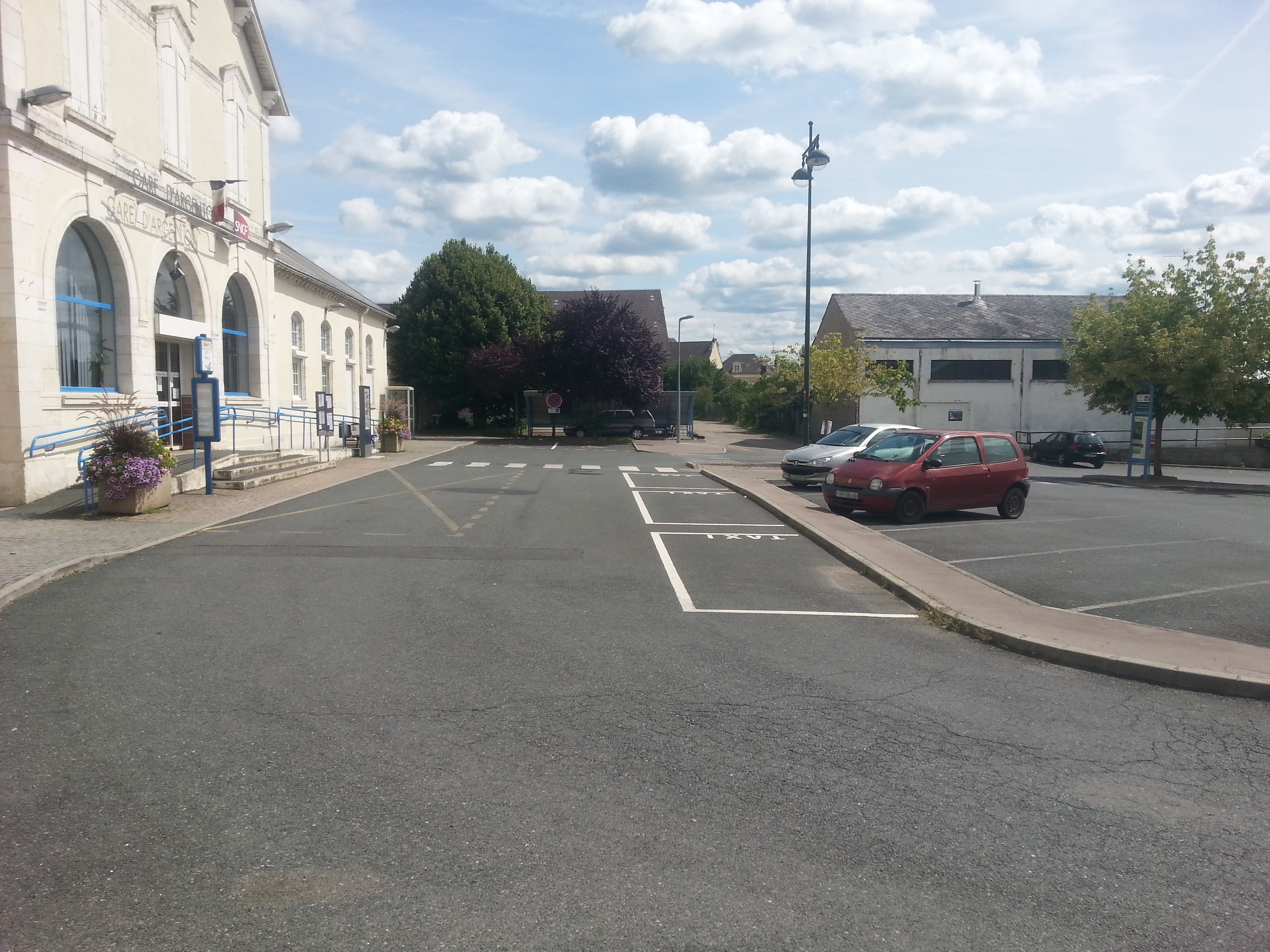
The station forecourt.

The station is served by the J, K, L and N routes of the Centre-Val de Loire inter-city transport network and by Route 1.3 of the TER Centre-Val de Loire coach network.

A parking area for motor vehicles (54 spaces) taxis and bikes (12 spaces) is available.

== Goods services ==
The station is open to freight traffic and features an Industrial spur.

== Argenton-sur-Creuse railway station defence committee ==
A committee for defence of the station was created in April 2018 in order to preserve the number of services and to demand the restoration of stops deleted from the Intercités timetables in July 2017.

The public's involvement gave rise to a protest assembling over 1000 people on September 22, 2018.

The actions of the committee lead the reinstallment of the 19:38 service from May 2019 onwards.

The committee's president met with French Transport Minister Élisabeth Borne during her visit to Châteauroux on July 15, 2019.

Among other modes of activism, the committee protests by interrupting the flow of trains in order to demand additional Intercité services which would allow at least one return journey a day to both Paris and Limoges.
