= SNCF Class Z 7300 =

Class of 75 French electric multiple unit trains

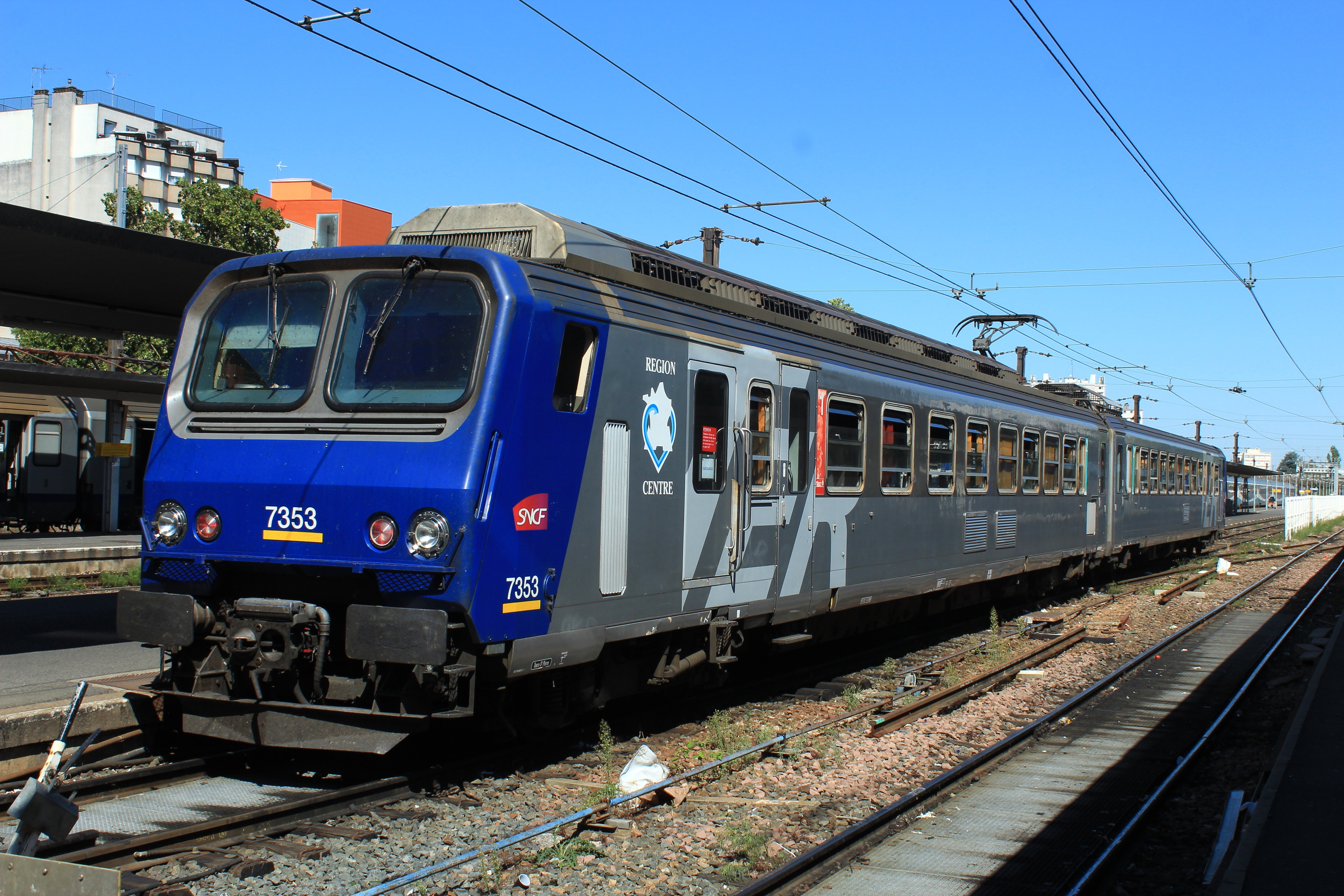
- In service: 1980–present
- Constructed: 1980–1984
- Number built: 75
- Number in service: 20 (20 December 2019)
- Fleet numbers: Z 7301-Z 7373 and Z 97381-Z 97384
- Operator: SNCF/TER

Specifications
- Maximum speed: 160 km/h (99 mph)
- Seating: 151

The SNCF Class Z 7300 electric multiple units were built by Alsthom between 1980 and 1984. They are part of the Z2 family of EMUs, which also includes the Z 7500, the Z 9500, and the Z 9600.

The last two operating Z 7300 units, Z 7317 and Z 7371, were removed from service on December 23, 2023.

== Gallery ==
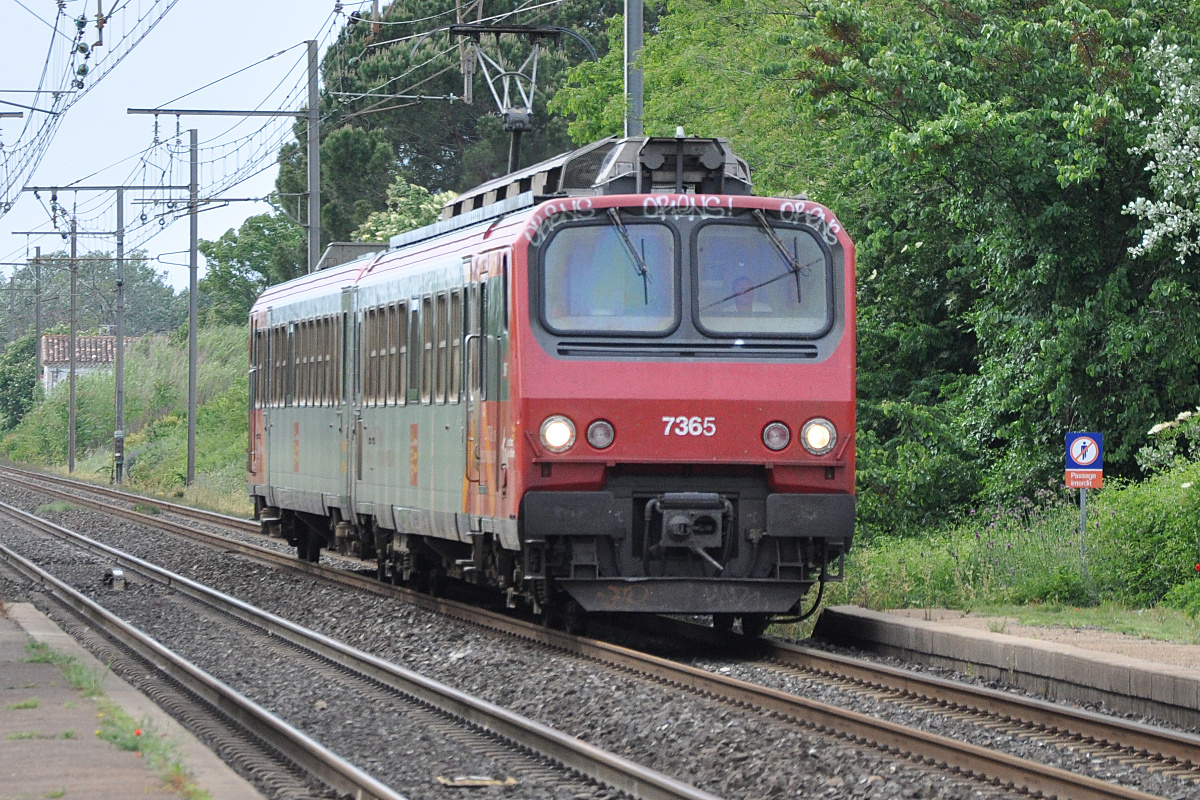
Z 7365 entering Manduel-Redessan station in 2011.

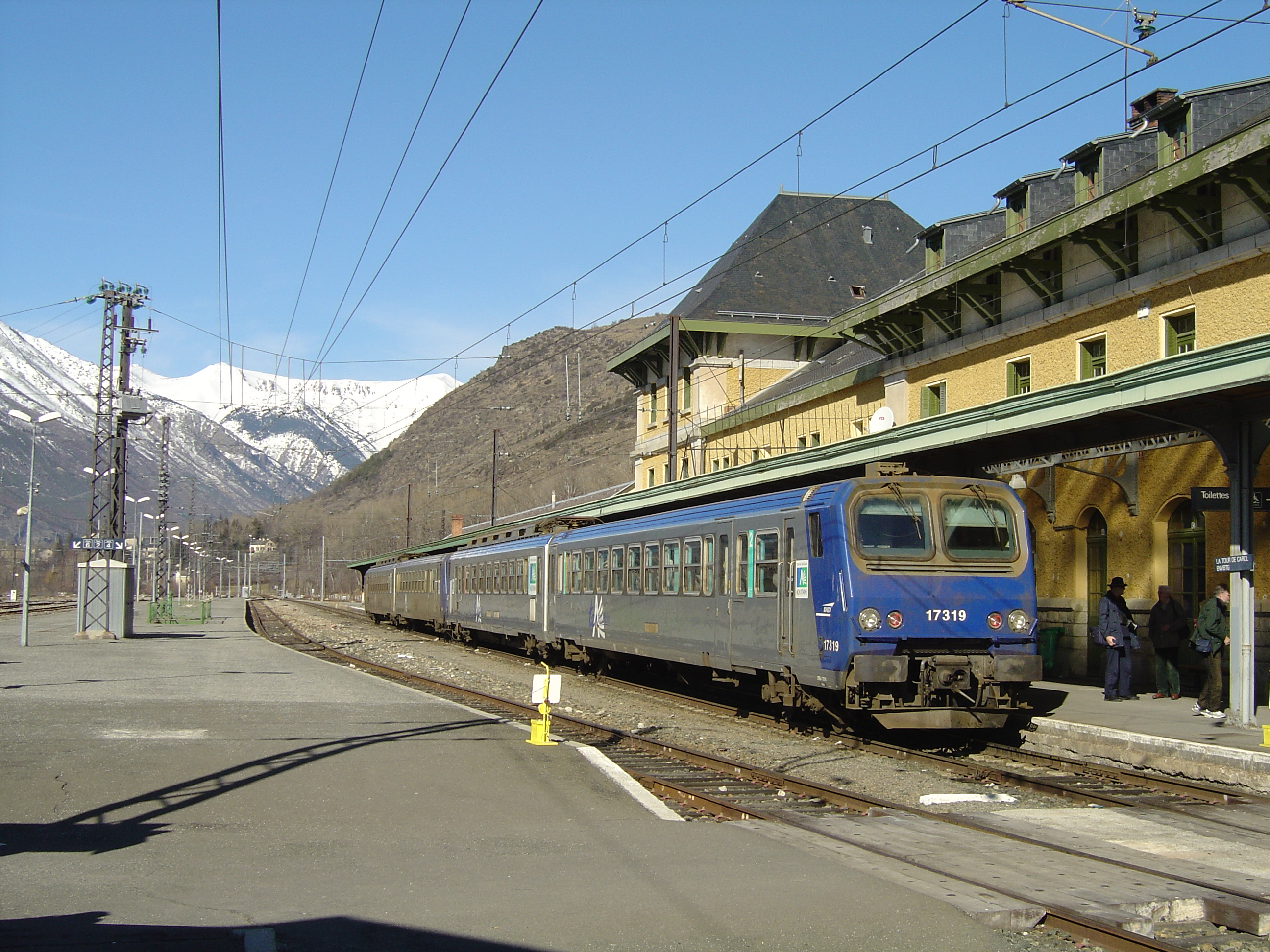
Refurbished Z7319 at Latour-de-Carol station
