= TER Franche-Comté =

Overview
- Website: http://www.sncf.com/en/trains/ter

Technical
- Track gauge: 1,435 mm (4 ft 8 1/2 in) standard gauge
TER Franche-Comté map
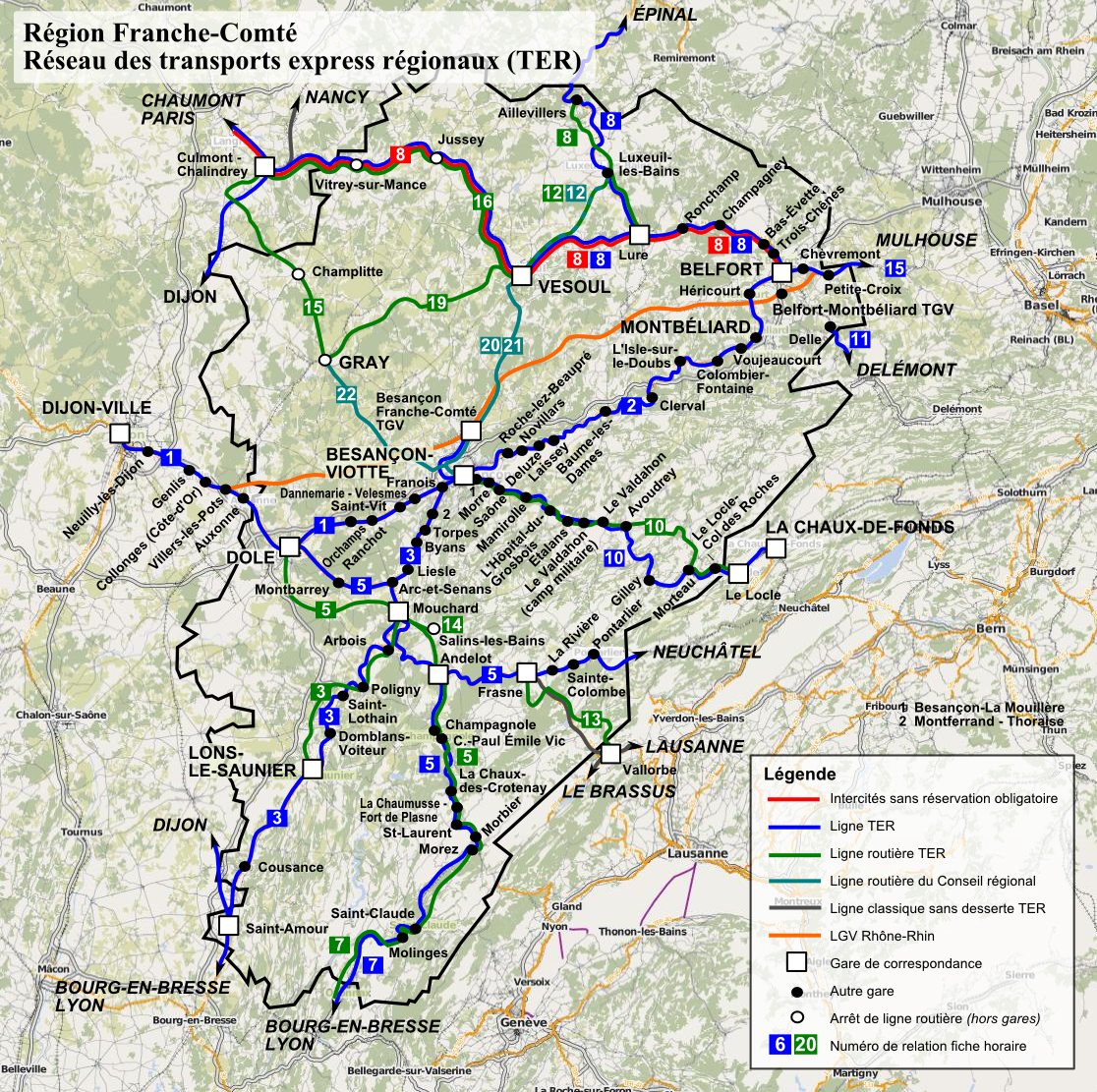

TER Franche-Comté was the regional rail network serving the Franche-Comté région, France. In 2017 it was merged into the new TER Bourgogne-Franche-Comté.

Since the convention signed in 2002 for a duration of 5 years, between Jean-François Humbert, then president of the Regional council of Franche-Comté and Noël Belin, then regional director of the SNCF, the regional council of Franche-Comté is the organising authority of regional transports. A new agreement, signed on 21 December 2006, by Raymond Forni, president of the Conseil Régional de Franche-Comté and Josiane Beaud, regional directeur of the SNCF, en présence d'Anne-Marie Idrac, présidente of the SNCF, from 2007 to 2012.

== TER railway connections ==
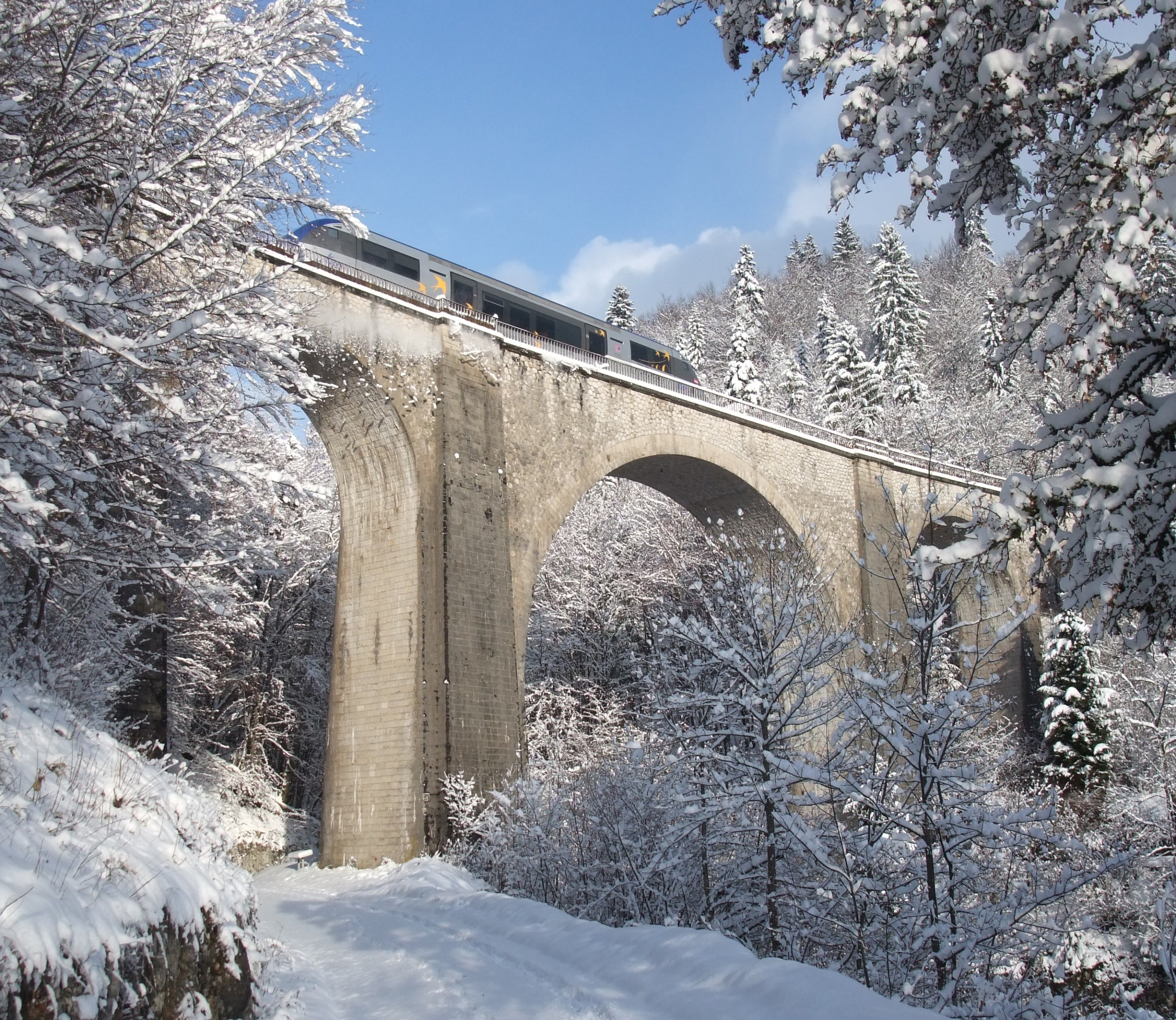
Viaduct near Morez

| Line | Route | Frequency | Notes |
|---|---|---|---|
| 1 | Dijon ... Dole ... Besançon-Viotte | | |
| 2 | Besançon-Viotte ... Montbéliard ... Belfort | | |
| 3 | Besançon-Viotte ... Mouchard ... Lons-le-Saunier ... Bourg-en-Bresse | | |
| 4 | Dole ... Mouchard ... Frasne ... Pontarlier | | |
| 5 | Besançon-Viotte/Dole ... Mouchard ... Champagnole ... Morez ... Saint-Claude | | |
| 8 | Vesoul – Lure ... Belfort | | |
| 9 | Nancy ... Épinal ... Lure ... Belfort (see TER Lorraine line 5 for details) | | |
| 10 | Besançon-Viotte ... Valdahon ... Morteau ... La Chaux-de-Fonds (Switzerland) | | |
† Not all trains call at this station

- The two lines Dijon–Dole–Besançon and Besançon–Montbéliard–Belfort essentially form one line, called the Saône–Doubs line. It constitutes the backbone of trips in Franche-Comté with 60% of the passengers and 60% of the Gross profit. It's along this route that the line bypasses highwayss, canals and other railways.
- The Revermont line: Besançon–Lons-le-Saunier–Bourg-en-Bresse. Second line by its importance, is, for a large part, a single track (between Saint-Amour and Mouchard).
- Besançon–Morteau–La Chaux-de-Fonds : this line has been certified by French normes in 2005. The trains on this line are usually done with SNCF Class X 73500 and SNCF Class X 2800, though occasionally they are upgraded to SNCF Class XR 6200.
- Belfort–Épinal
- Dijon–Pontarlier
- Dole–Saint-Claude: this line is called the ligne des hirondelles (line of swallows)
- Montbéliard–Belfort–Vesoul
- Morez–Bourg-en-Bresse–Lyon

== Rolling stock ==
=== Multiple units ===
- SNCF Class Z 9500
- SNCF Class Z 9600
- SNCF Class X 2800+ trailers SNCF Class XR 6000
- SNCF Class X 4750
- SNCF Class X 73500
- SNCF Class X 76500 (also called: XGC X 76500)
- SNCF Class Z 27500 (also called: ZGC Z 27500)

=== Locomotives ===
- SNCF Class BB 22200
- SNCF Class BB 25500

== See also ==
- SNCF
- Transport express régional
- Réseau Ferré de France
- List of SNCF stations in Franche-Comté
