= Rollinat =

Rollinat is a surname. Notable people with the surname include:

- Maurice Rollinat (1846–1903), French poet and musician
- Raymond Rollinat (1859–1931), French herpetologist
