= Orléans–Montauban railway =

Railroad in France

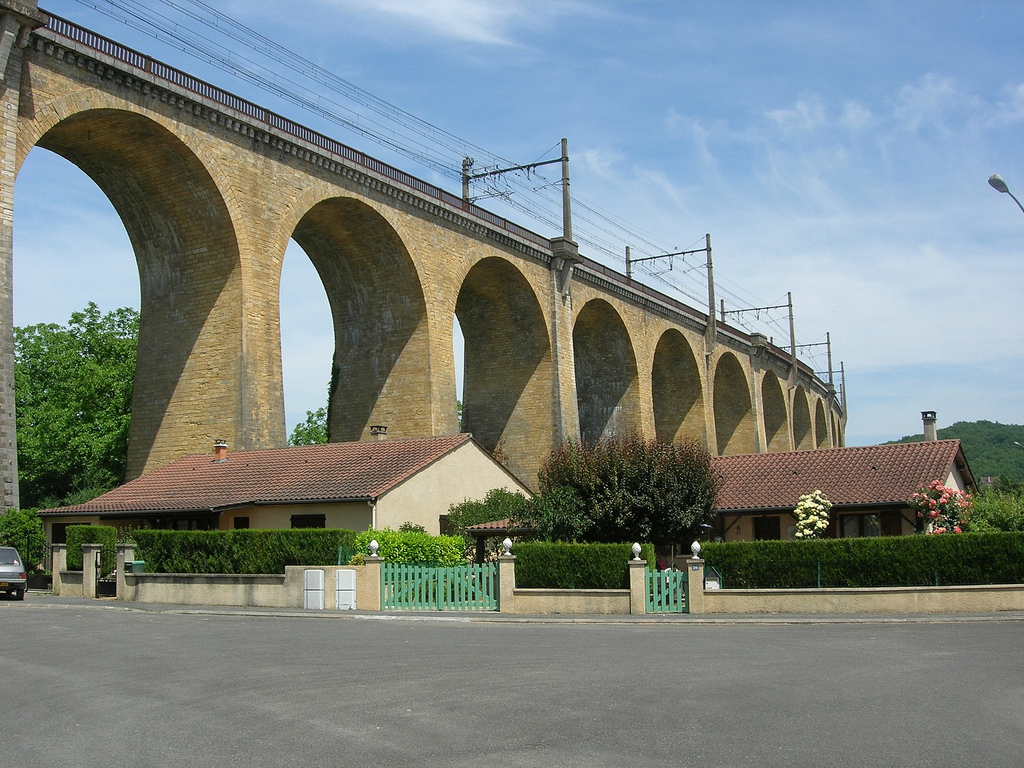
- Viaduc SNCF de Souillac France

Overview
- Status: Operational
- Owner: RFF
- Locale: France (Centre-Val de Loire, Nouvelle-Aquitaine, Occitanie)
- Termini: Les Aubrais station; Montauban-Ville-Bourbon station

Service
- System: SNCF
- Operator: SNCF

History
- Opened: 1847-1893

Technical
- Line length: 544 km (338 mi)
- Number of tracks: Double track
- Track gauge: 1,435 mm (4 ft 8 1/2 in) standard gauge
- Electrification: 1.5 kV DC

The railway from Orléans to Montauban is an important French 544-kilometre long railway line, that connects Orléans and northern France to Montauban and southern France via Limoges. The railway was opened in several stages between 1847 and 1893, when the section from Limoges to Brive-la-Gaillarde was finished.

== Route ==
The Orléans–Montauban railway leaves the Les Aubrais station, entering its terminus Montauban-Ville-Bourbon station after a total length of 544 km.

By extension, the route from Paris via Orléans and Limoges to Toulouse, a length of over 700 km, is known by the initialism POLT.

=== Main stations ===
The main stations on the Orléans–Montauban railway are:

- Les Aubrais station
- Vierzon-Ville station
- Châteauroux station
- Limoges-Bénédictins station
- Brive-la-Gaillarde station
- Montauban-Ville-Bourbon station

== History ==
The section Orléans–Châteauroux was built and exploited by the Compagnie du Centre, that became part of Chemin de fer de Paris à Orléans in 1852. The PO extended the railway afterwards. The first section that was opened in 1847 led from Orléans (on the existing line from Paris to Tours) to Châteauroux. The line was extended to Argenton-sur-Creuse in 1854. Limoges was reached in 1856.

The opening of the Limoges–Périgueux railway (1861), the Périgueux–Brive-la-Gaillarde section of the Coutras–Tulle railway (1860) and the Brive-la-Gaillarde–Toulouse railway (1858-1864) offered a much shorter connection between Paris and Toulouse than the existing line via Tours and Bordeaux. The opening of the Nexon–Brive-la-Gaillarde railway in 1875 shortened the distance by 69 km.

The distance between Paris and Toulouse was shortened by a further 42 km by the opening of the Limoges–Montauban section of the Orléans–Montauban railway, in three stages: Cahors–Montauban in 1884, Brive-la-Gaillarde–Cahors in 1891, and finally Limoges–Brive-la-Gaillarde via Uzerche in 1893.

== Services ==
The Orléans–Montauban railway is used by the following passenger services:

- TGV on the section between Orléans and Brive-la-Gaillarde
- Intercités from Bordeaux to Lyon on the section between Limoges and Saint-Sulpice-Laurière, and from Paris to Toulouse on the whole line
- TER Centre-Val de Loire, TER Nouvelle-Aquitaine and TER Occitanie regional services on the whole line
