= SNCF Class Z 9600 =

Class of French electric multiple unit trains

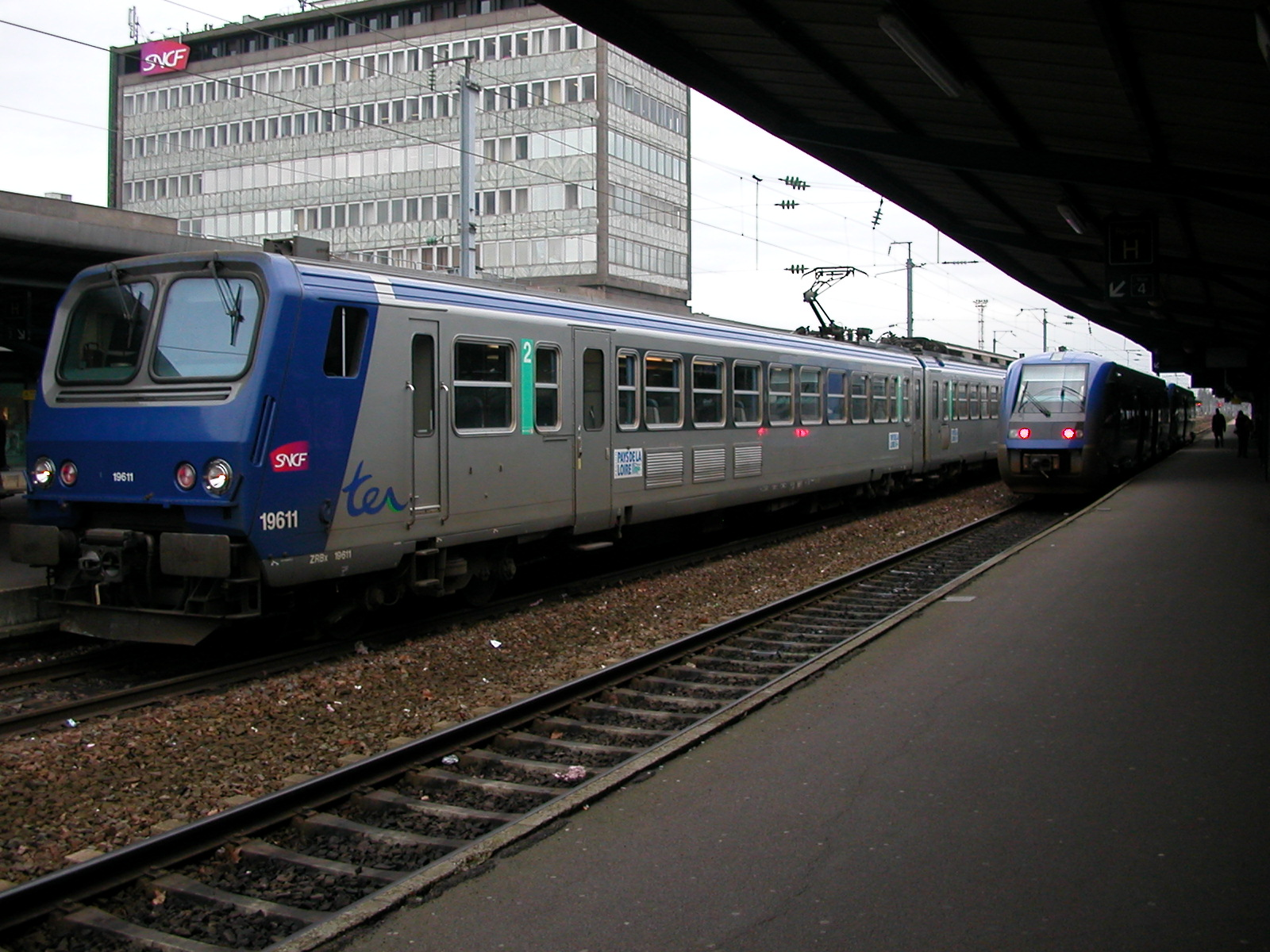
Refurbished Z 19611 + 9611 of TER Pays de la Loire at Nantes

The SNCF Class Z 9600 is a class of French electric multiple units built by Alsthom between 1984–1987. They are part of the Z2 type of electric multiple units, all similarly styled. The other Z2 classes are Z 7300, Z 7500 and Z 9500. The class operates in the Loire and the Alps. The class wear several liveries. The original livery is dark blue with red fronts. There are 36 units in the class.

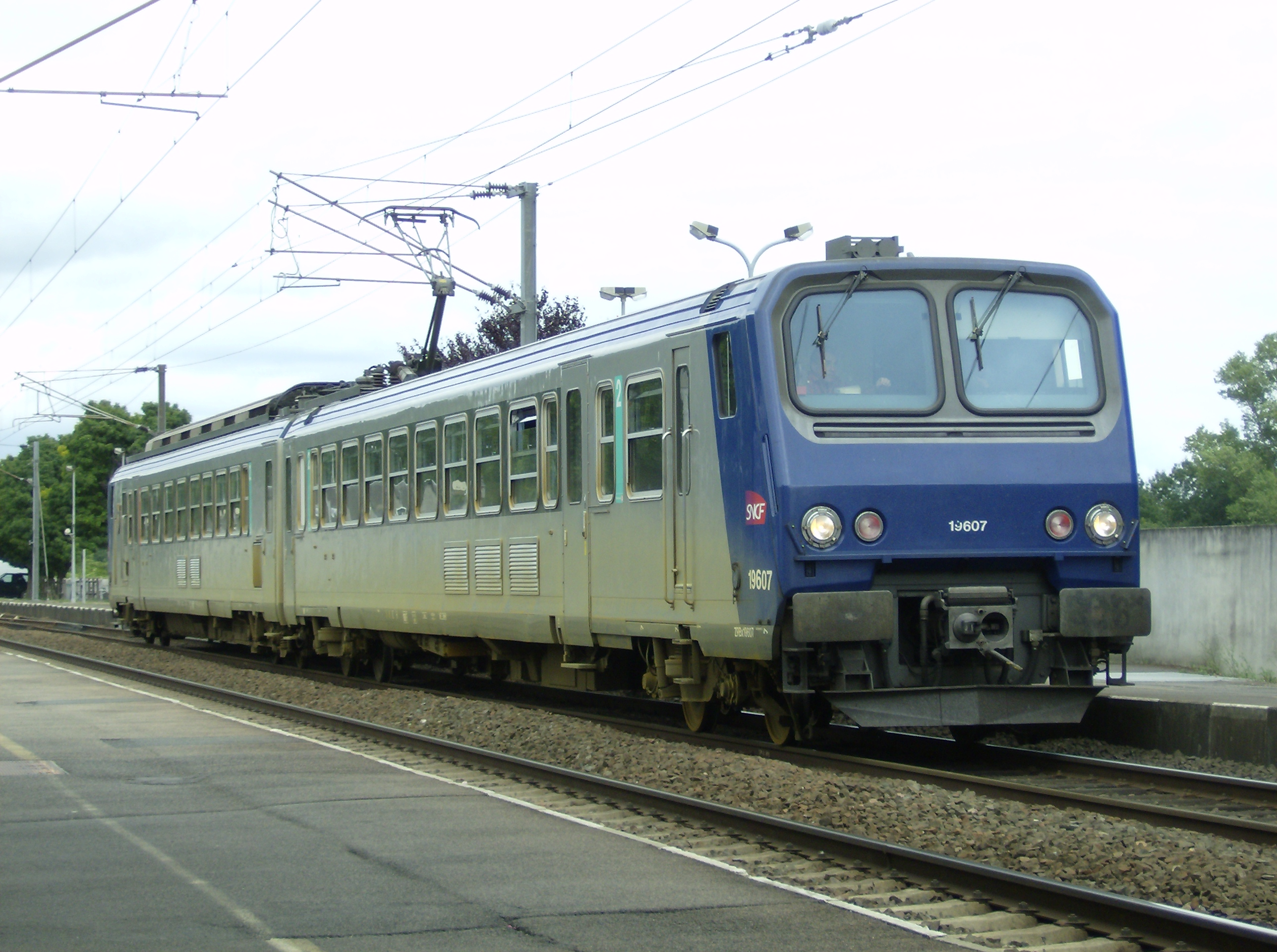
Z 9607/19607 (Z2) near Tours. This unit has been reliveried and is the same unit as in the top picture.

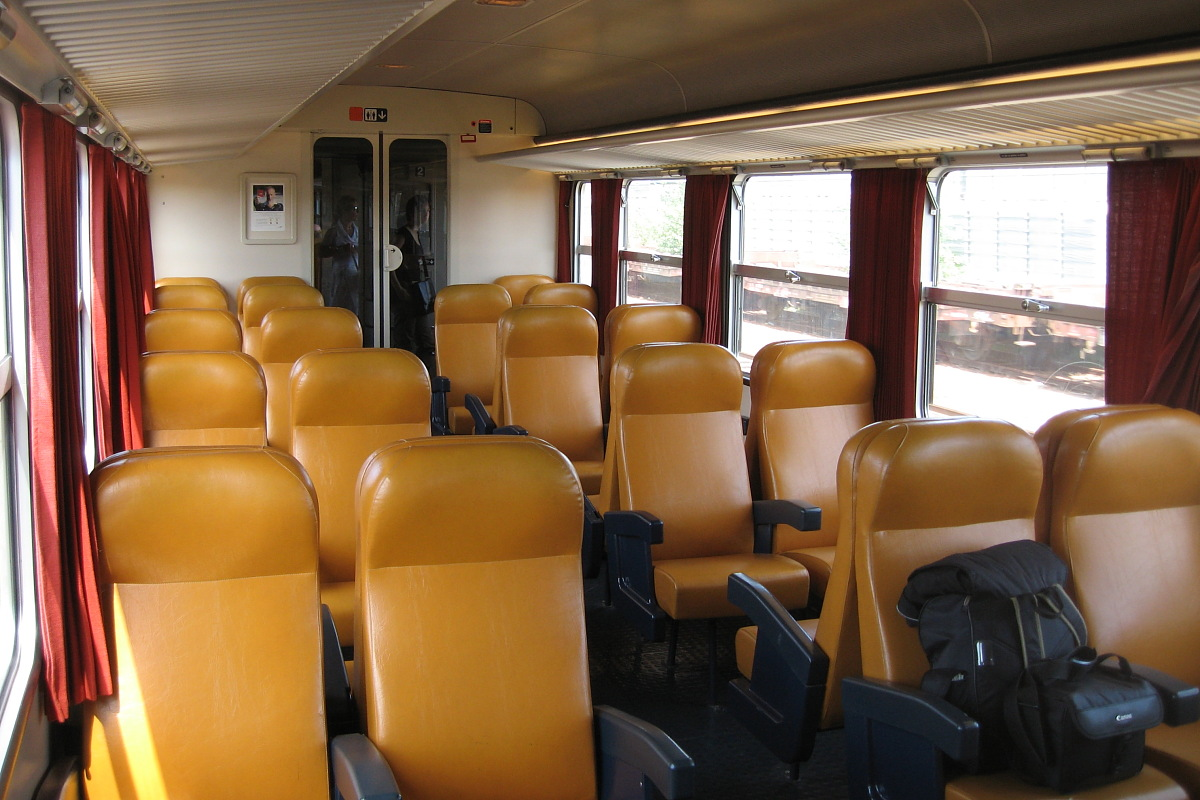
Interior prior to refurbishment

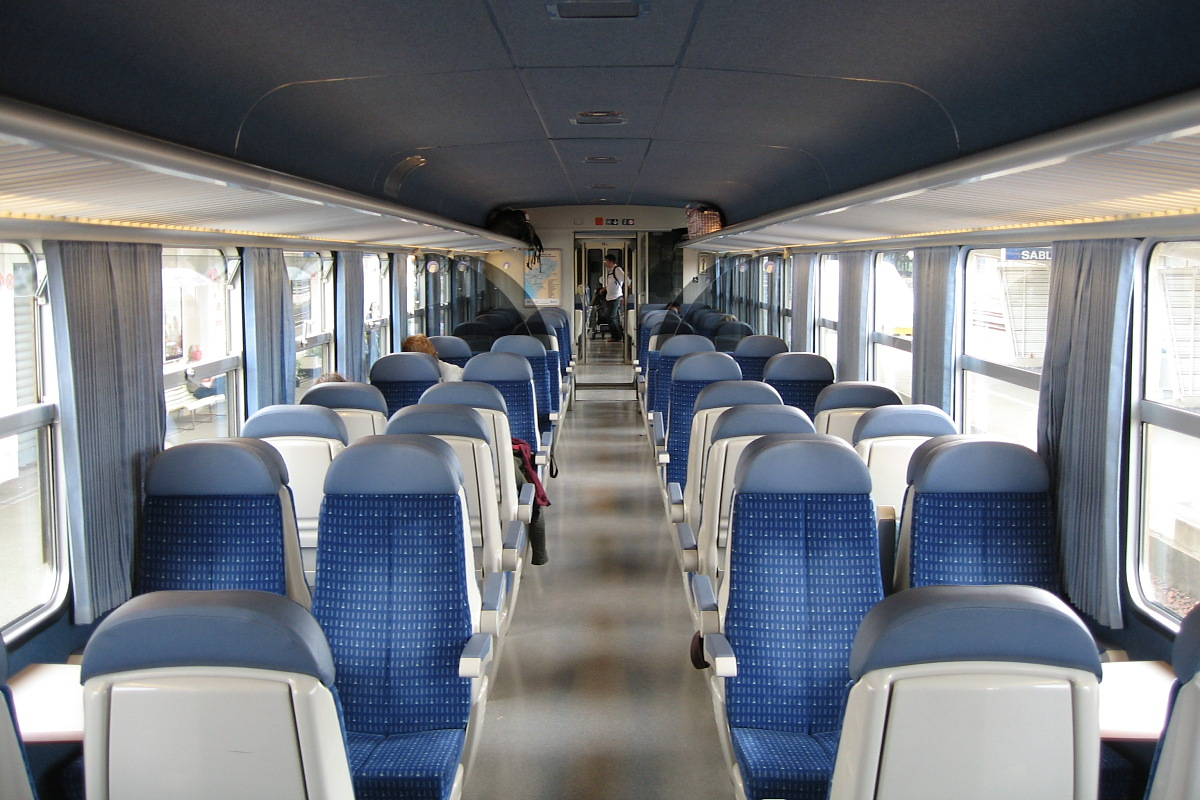
Interior after refurbishment
