= Les Aubrais station =

Railway station in Fleury-les-Aubrais, France

Les Aubrais
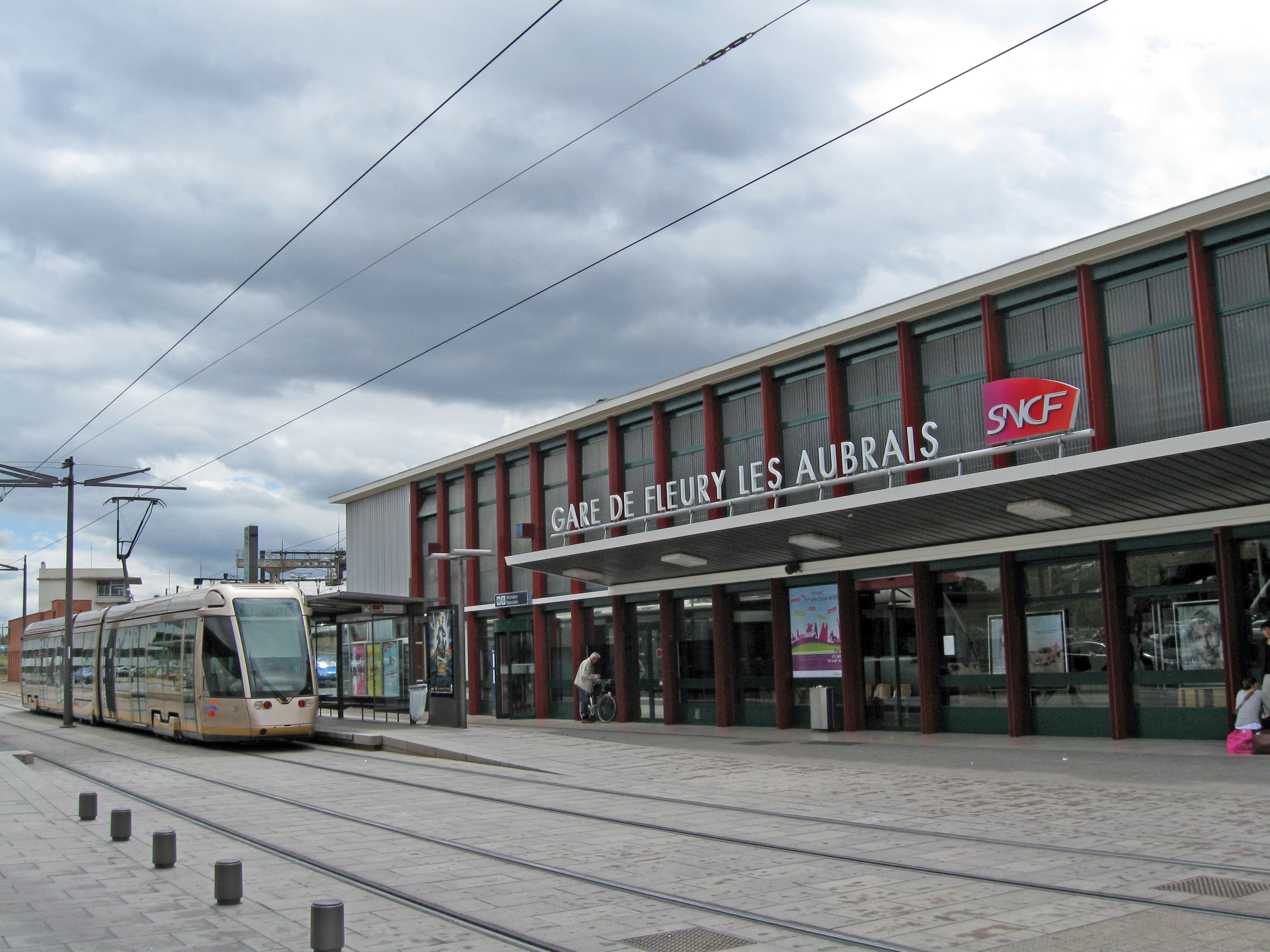
- The passenger building

General information
- Location: Rue Lamartine, 45400; Fleury-les-Aubrais; France
- Coordinates: 47.9266°N 1.9066°E
- Elevation: 119 m (390 ft)
- Owner: RFF / SNCF
- Operator: SNCF
- Lines: Paris–Bordeaux; Orléans–Montauban; Aubrais-Orléans–Orléans; Aubrais-Orléans–Malesherbes; Aubrais-Orléans–Montargis

Other information
- Station code: 87543017

History
- Opened: 5 May 1843

Passengers
- 2024: 1,537,304
Services
Preceding station	SNCF	Following station
Paris-Austerlitz Terminus	Intercités	Vierzon-Ville towards Toulouse
Paris-Austerlitz Terminus	Intercités (night)	Saint-Denis-près-Martel towards Albi-Ville
Paris-Austerlitz Terminus	Intercités (night)	Tarbes towards Hendaye
Paris-Austerlitz Terminus	Intercités (night)	Auterive towards Latour-de-Carol
Paris-Austerlitz Terminus	Intercités (night)	Castelnaudary towards Cerbère
Paris-Austerlitz Terminus	Intercités (night)	Souillac towards Toulouse
Preceding station	Le Réseau Rémi	Following station
Orléans Terminus	1.1	Cercottes towards Paris-Austerlitz
Preceding station	Ouigo	Following station
Juvisy towards Paris-Austerlitz	Train Classique	Blois towards Nantes
Location

The gare des Aubrais (before 2014: gare des Aubrais-Orléans) is a main-line railway station located in the town of Fleury-les-Aubrais in Loiret, central France, and serving the greater Orléans district. It is situated on the Paris to Bordeaux railway and is also the northern terminus of the Orléans to Montauban line. TGV and most other long-distance trains serve only the Gare des Aubrais, and not the more central Gare d'Orléans.

== Services ==
The station is served by Intercités (long distance) services towards Paris and Toulouse, and by regional services (TER Centre-Val de Loire) to Orléans and Paris.
