= Germaine Rouillard =

- Born: 4 August 1888; Argenton-sur-Creuse
- Died: 1 September 1946 (aged 58); Paris
- Occupations: Byzantinist; Philologist

Germaine Rouillard (French pronunciation: [ʒɛʁmɛn ʁujaʁ]; 4 August 1888 – 1 September 1946) was a 20th-century French byzantinist specializing in philology.

== Biography ==
The daughter of a wealthy and educated pharmacist of Argenton-sur-Creuse where she spent her childhood, she was well educated in Indre and Paris then was a librarian at the Sorbonne. In 1923 she obtained her State doctorate in literature at the Faculté of Paris. She was never elected a female professor at the Sorbonne but became the first woman to hold a chair, that of Byzantine philology at the École pratique des hautes études where she would spend all her academic career. She specialized in papyrology and Byzantine philology.

== Selected works ==
- 1923: L'administration civile de l’Égypte byzantine, preface by Charles Diehl, 268 p., P. Gauthier, Paris, doctorate thesis
- 1923: Les papyrus grecs de Vienne, inventaire des documents publiés, H. Champion, Paris, complementary thesis
- 1937: Actes de Lavru, édition diplomatique et critique by Germaine Rouillard and Paul Collomp, in Archives de l'Athos, vol. I, (p. 897–1178), L. Lethielleux, Paris.
- 1932: Les taxes maritimes et commerciales d'après les actes de Patnos et de Lavru, in Mélanges Charles Diehl, tome I, (p. 277–289)
- 1953: La vie rurale dans l'Empire byzantin, 207 p., Adrien Maisonneuve, Paris, (posthumous).

== Bibliography ==
- 1929: R. Draguet, "Compte-rendu de L'administration civile de l'Egypte byzantine", in Revue belge de philosophie et d'histoire, volume VIII, (p. 246–248).
- 1932: R. Guillaud, "Compte-rendu de Les taxes maritimes et commerciales d'après les actes de Patnos et de Lavru", in Annales d'histoire économique et sociale, (p. 429–430), volume IV, n° 6.
- 1947: Claire Préaux, "Germaine Rouillard", Chronique d'Égypte 22, n° 43, (p. 174–176).
- 1954: R. Jannin, "Compte-rendu de La vie rurale dans l'empire byzantin", in Revue des études byzantines, volume XII, n° 12, (p. 221–222)
- 2010: "Germaine Rouillard", in Argentonnais connus et méconnus, (p. 56), Cercle d'histoire d'Argenton-sur-Creuse, Argenton.
