= Châteauroux station =

Railway station in Châteauroux, France

Coordinates: 46°48′34″N 1°41′59″E

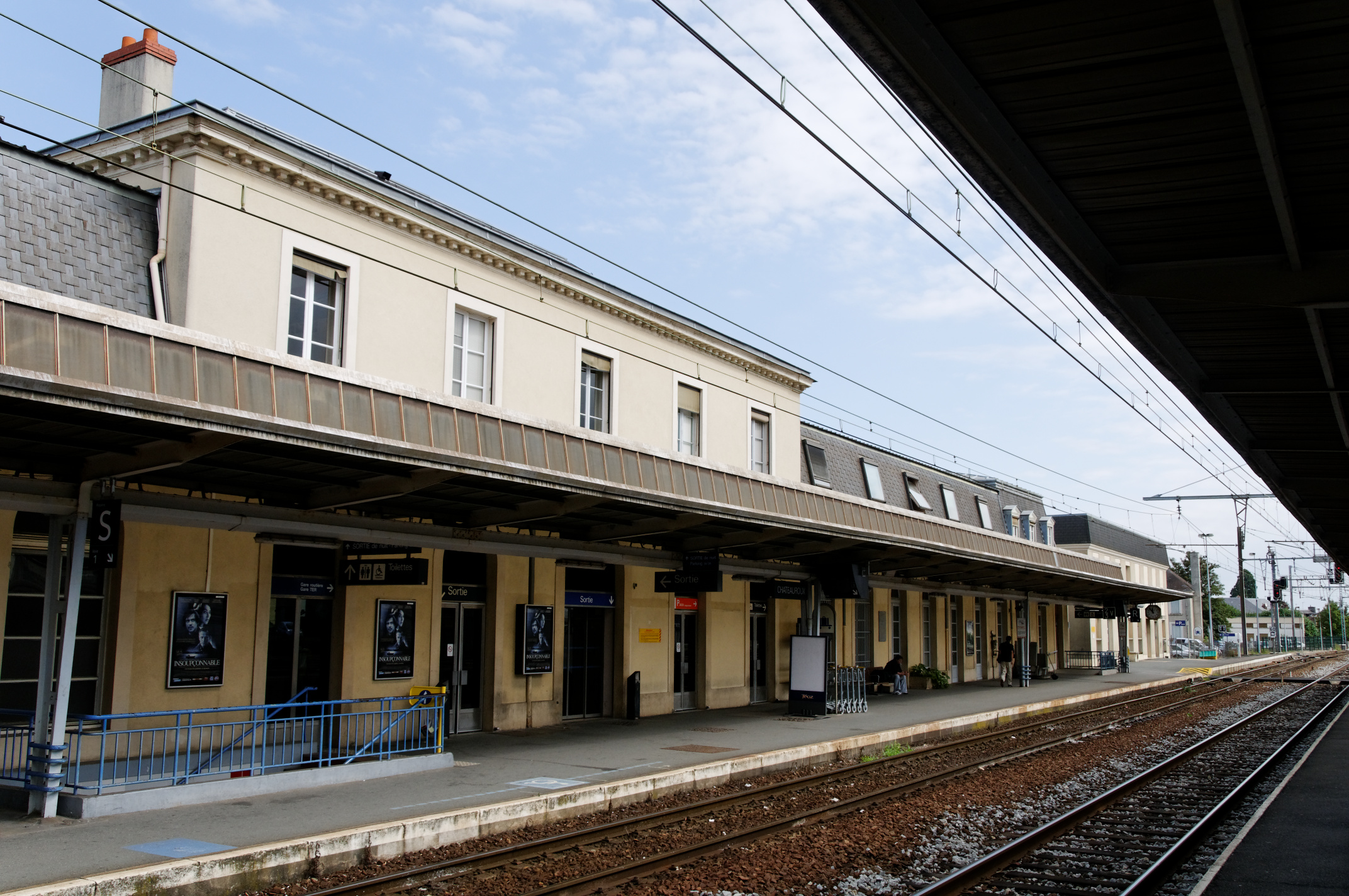
Châteauroux station

Châteauroux station (French: Gare de Châteauroux) is a railway station serving the commune of Châteauroux in the Indre department of central France. It is situated on the Orléans–Montauban railway, between the communes Vierzon and Limoges.

== Services ==
The station is served by Intercités (long distance) services to Paris and Toulouse, and by regional services (TER Centre-Val de Loire) to Vierzon and Limoges.

Preceding station	SNCF	Following station
Issoudun towards Paris-Austerlitz	Intercités	Argenton-sur-Creuse towards Toulouse
Preceding station	Le Réseau Rémi	Following station
Neuvy-Pailloux towards Vierzon	1.3	Luant towards Limoges
