= Argentomagus =

Human settlement in France

Coordinates: 46°36′1.40″N 1°30′54.10″E

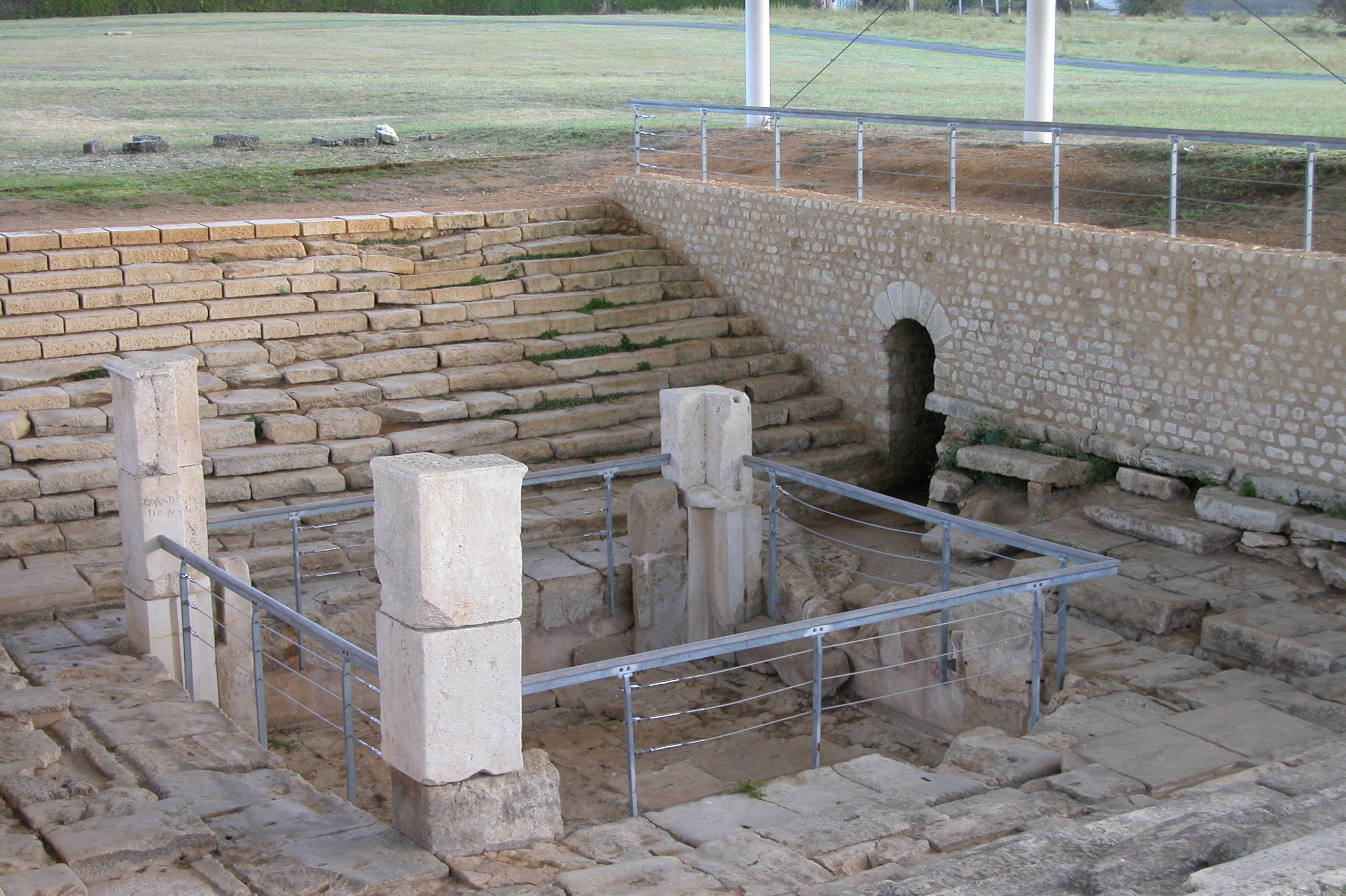
The fountain at Argentomagus in 2009

The Roman city of Argentomagus was located in the Mersans plateau of central France, at the strategic point on the north bank of the river Creuse, where a Roman bridge once traversed. It was located at the crossing of two roads—Cenabum (Orléans) to Augustoritum (Limoges), and Limonum (Poitiers) to Avaricum (Bourges). The Latin name of the city meant "Silver Market." The modern town of Argenton takes its name from the ancient site of Argentomagus.

== History ==
In pre-Roman and early-Roman occupation times, the site of Argentomagus was the home of the Bituriges tribe (their name meaning "kings of the world"). The Romans conquered the area circa 50 BCE. The city reached its peak during the Gallo-Roman period in the 2nd and 3rd century CE. During the late Empire the Notitia Dignitatum indicated a government arms factory in the city. At the end of the Classical period the population center relocated to the south bank and the original site was only lightly built on thereafter. The present-day village of Saint Marcel occupies only a small portion of the original location. Because of this Argentomagus is today an archaeological site of considerable significance.

According to legend Saint Marcellus was beheaded under Valerian (253–260) for destroying idols.

The cult of Mercury was popular among the inhabitants, who were active in metal smelting and bronze-smithing. Other cult figures included the Earth Mother, Venus, warrior heroes and various local deities.

== Archaeological site and museum ==
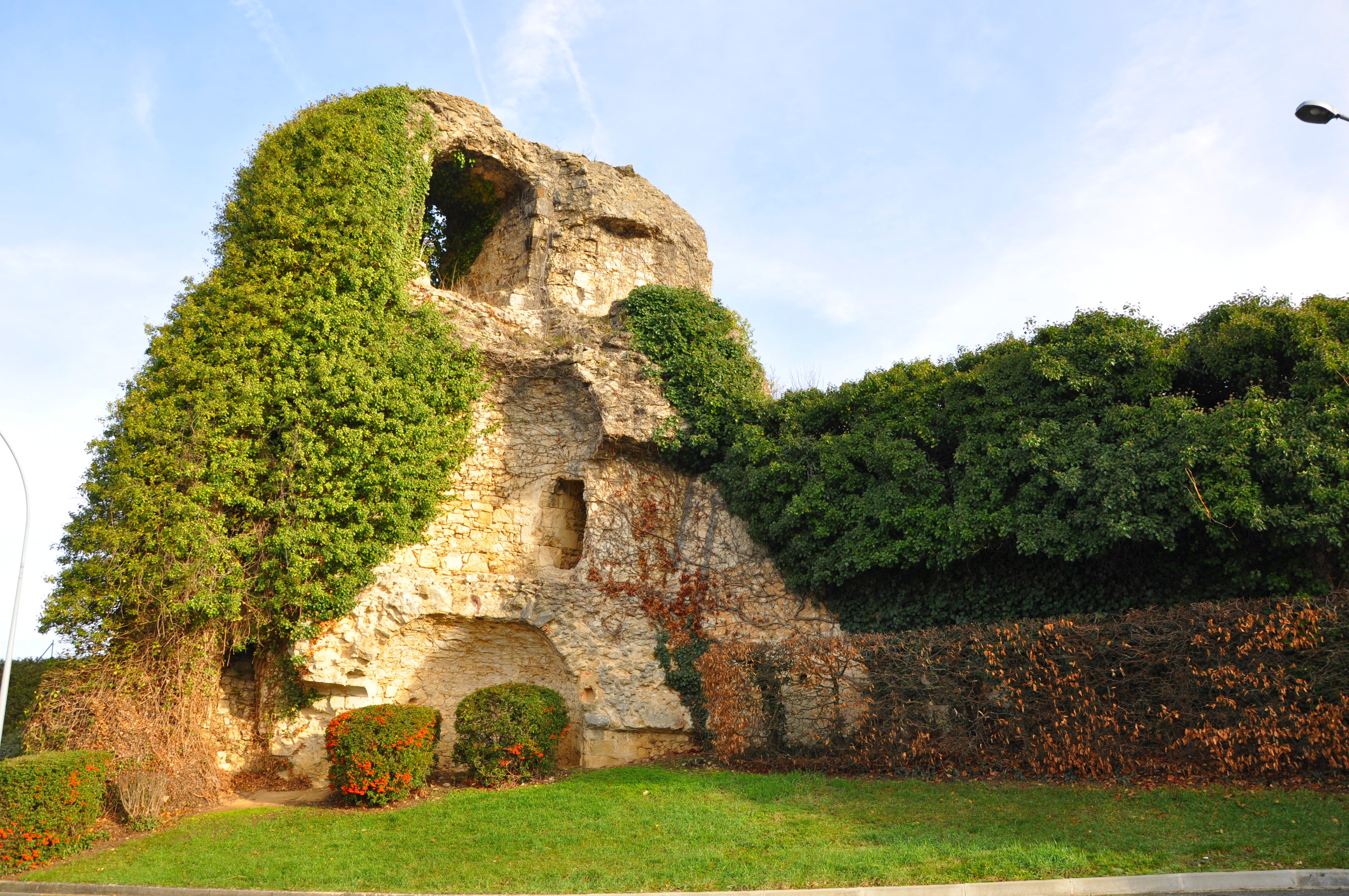
Ruins of a noble house in Argenton

The archaeological site is of prime interest as it shows how the town evolved from a Gaulish settlement into a Roman town. Substantial areas of the ruins have been excavated, including an amphitheatre, a Roman villa, a cemetery, a thermal spring. Unique finds have also been recovered, such as a circular altar pedestal. A local museum related to the site exists in Mersans.

== Sources ==
- "Argentomagus : Oppidum gaulois" by Françoise Dumasy-Mathieu
- "Argentomagus": by Gerard Coulon
- "Le théâtre d'Argentomagus" (Saint-Marcel, Indre): by Françoise Dumasy
