= Raymond Rollinat =

French herpetologist (1859–1931)

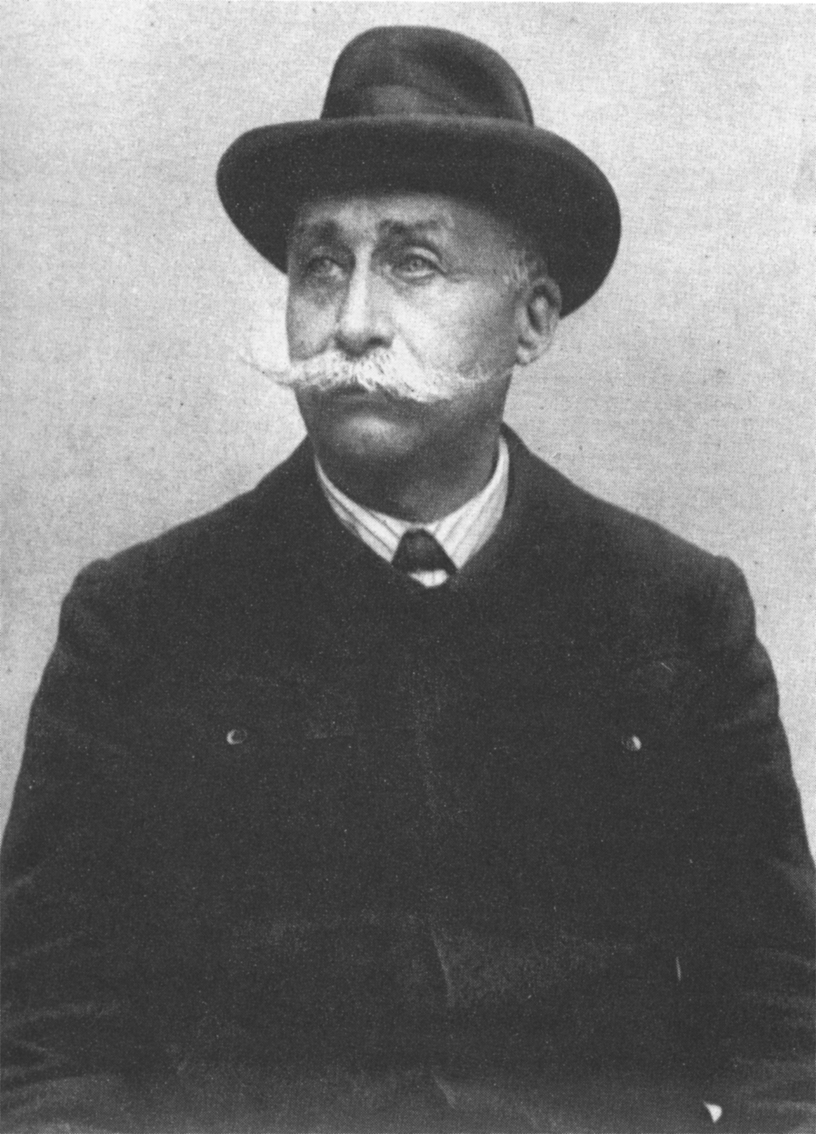
- Born: Pierre André Marie Raymond Rollinat; 2 September 1859; Saint-Gaultier, Centre-Val de Loire, France
- Died: 27 December 1931 (aged 72)
- Occupation: Herpetologist

Pierre André Marie Raymond Rollinat (French pronunciation: [pjɛʁ ɑ̃dʁe maʁi ʁɛmɔ̃ ʁɔlina]; 2 September 1859, Saint-Gaultier – 27 December 1931) was a French herpetologist. He was related to the poet, Maurice Rollinat (1846-1903).

As a young boy, Rollinat learned a love of animals from his great-uncle, an amateur ornithologist, and while a high school student in Châteauroux, he trained under a local taxidermist. As an adult, except for a period of time spent in the military, he lived his entire life in Argenton-sur-Creuse, where he kept a laboratory with a large adjacent garden. In his garden he set up various enclosures and vivaria in order to observe animal behavior close-up.

Rollinat was dedicated to research of vertebrates native to central France, in particular reptiles and amphibians. His work included studies of breeding habits, hibernation, hatching of eggs and embryonic development. He took particular interest in the habits of the European pond turtle, which was one of a number of local species that he devoted an in-depth life history to.

During his career he maintained correspondence with fellow herpetologists, George Albert Boulenger (1858-1937), Willy Wolterstorff (1864-1943) and Mario Giacinto Peracca (1861-1923).

== Written works ==
In 1934, his La Vie des reptiles de la France centrale was first published, later being re-issued in 1937, 1946 and 1980.

- Catalogue des reptiles, batraciens et poissons du département de l'Indre, 1891 - Catalog of reptiles, amphibians and fish from the department of Indre.
- La Capture des Alouettes dans le département de l'Indre - Capture of larks in the department of Indre.
- Sur la reproduction des chauvessouris, 1896 - On reproduction involving bats.
- Observations sur quelques reptiles du département de l'Indre. Moeurs et reproduction de l'orvet fragile, 1897 - Observations on a few reptiles from the department of Indre, Behavior and reproduction of Anguis fragilis (a slowworm species).
- Sur le Sens de la Direction chez les Chiroptéres, 1900 - On sense of direction involving Chiroptera.
- Observations sur quelques reptiles du département de l'Indre; moeurs et reproduction du lézard vert, 1900 - Observations on a few reptiles from the department of Indre, Behavior and reproduction of the green lizard.
- Sur le caractére et l'intelligence de quelques reptiles du département de l'Indre, 1901 - On character and intelligence of a few reptiles from the department of Indre.
- Observations sur quelques reptiles du département de l'Indre. Moeurs, reproduction et domestication de la cistude d'Europe, 1902 - Observations on a few reptiles from the department of Indre, Reproduction and domestication of the European pond turtle
- Description et moeurs des mammiferes, oiseaux, reptiles, batraciens et poissons de la France centrale, 1914, (with René Martin) - Description and behavior of mammals, birds, reptiles, amphibians and fish of central France.
