= SNCF Class Z 9500 =

Class of French electric multiple unit trains

SNCF Z 9500
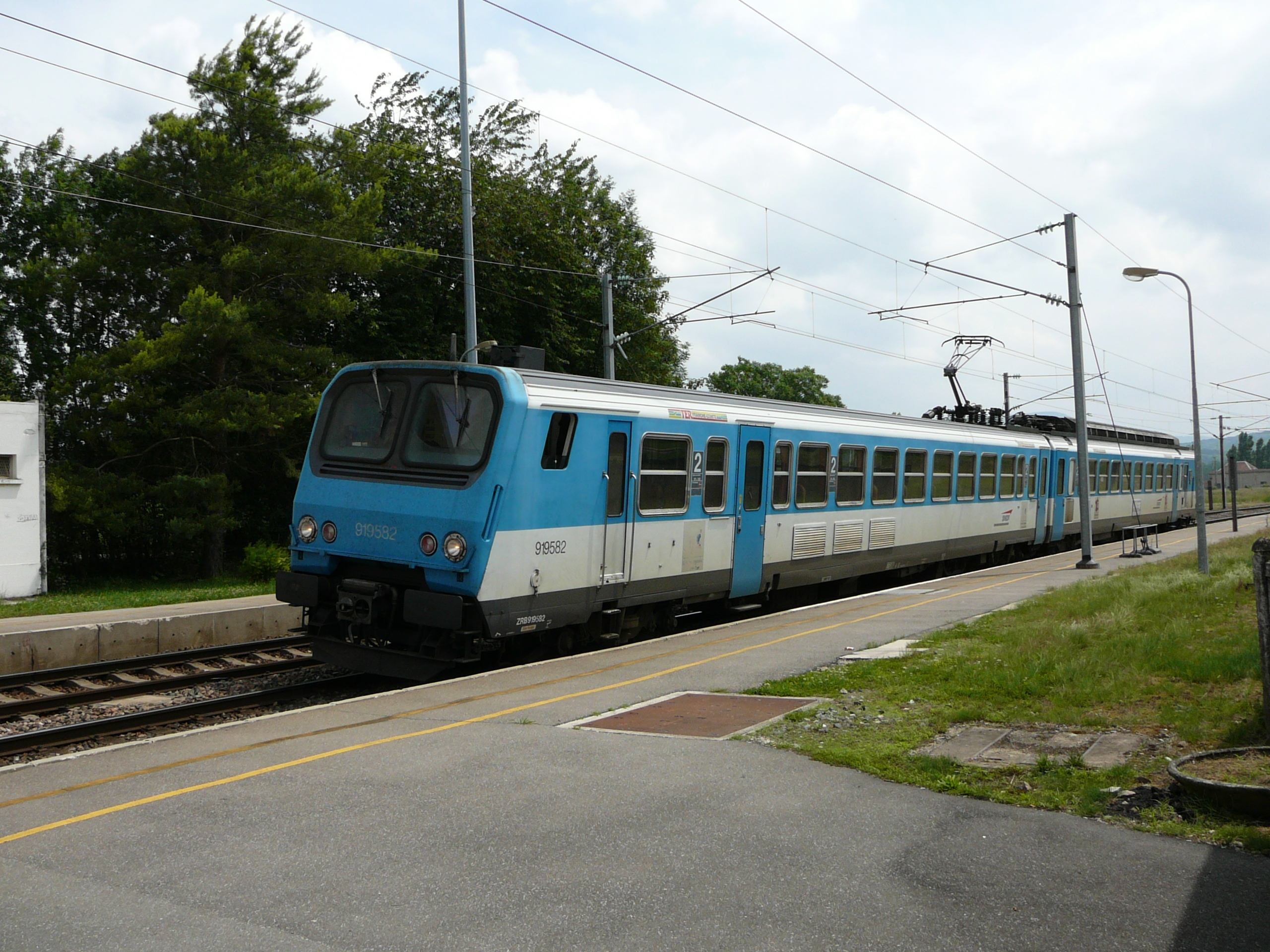
- Unrefurbished Z99582 of Region Franche-Comté at Arc-et-Senans station.
- In service: 1982 - Current
- Manufacturer: Alstom
- Family name: Z2 series
- Refurbished: Ongoing, 2007 - 2009
- Number built: 20 trainsets (40 cars)
- Formation: 2-car trainset
- Capacity: 32 (1st class); 119 (2nd class); 8 (standing)
- Operators: SNCF TER Bourgogne, TER Franche-Comté, TER Rhône-Alpes
- Depots: Lyon-Vénissieux

Specifications
- Car body construction: Steel
- Train length: 50.2 m (164 ft 8 3/8 in)
- Car length: 25,100 mm (82 ft 4 1/4 in)
- Width: 2,480 mm (8 ft 1 5/8 in)
- Height: 4,300 mm (14 ft 1 1/4 in)
- Maximum speed: 160 km/h (99 mph)
- Weight: 126.7 t (124.7 long tons; 139.7 short tons)
- Traction motors: four 750 V DC Alsthom TAB676 B1
- Power output: 1,275 kW (1,710 hp)
- Electric system(s): Overhead line: 25 kV 50 Hz AC; 1,500 V DC
- Current collection: Pantograph
- Braking system(s): Electrodynamic
- Safety system(s): Crocodile, KVB.
- Track gauge: 1,435 mm (4 ft 8 1/2 in) standard gauge

The SNCF Class Z 9500 electric multiple units were built by Alstom between 1982–1983. They are, together with the Z 9600 units, the dual-voltage version of the Z2 family. They are operated by TER Franche-Comté, TER Bourgogne and TER Rhône-Alpes. Many units still run in their original livery and have the original orange interior, although the first refurbished units with the unified TER-livery and AGC-style interiors are beginning to appear as of July 2007.
