= Argenton-sur-Creuse =

- Commune
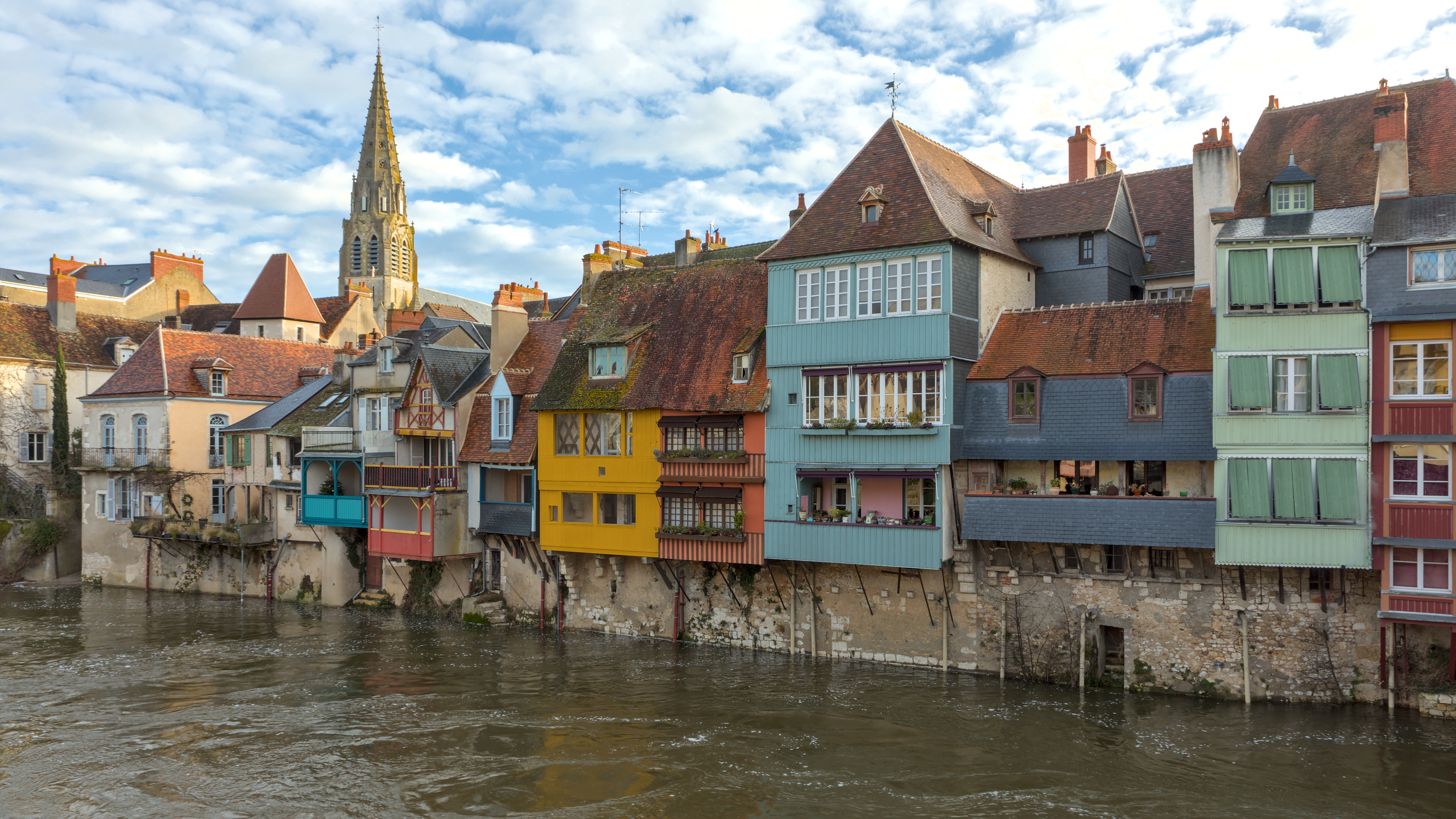
- The Creuse river and surrounding buildings

- Coat of arms
- Location of Argenton-sur-Creuse
- Location within France Location within Centre-Val de Loire
- Coordinates: 46°35′23″N 1°31′12″E
- Country: France
- Region: Centre-Val de Loire
- Department: Indre
- Arrondissement: Châteauroux
- Canton: Argenton-sur-Creuse
- Intercommunality: CC Éguzon - Argenton - Vallée Creuse

Government
  - Mayor (2020–2026): Vincent Millan
- Area^{1}: 29.34 km^{2} (11.33 sq mi)
- Elevation: 119 m (390 ft)
- Highest elevation: 234 m (768 ft)
- Lowest elevation: 99 m (325 ft)
- Population (2023): 4,786
  - Density: 163.1/km^{2} (422.5/sq mi)
- Time zone: UTC+01:00 (CET)
  - Summer (DST): UTC+02:00 (CEST)
- INSEE/Postal code: 36006 /36200
- ^{1} French Land Register data, which excludes lakes, ponds, glaciers > 1 km^{2} (0.386 sq mi or 247 acres) and river estuaries.

Argenton-sur-Creuse (French pronunciation: [aʁʒɑ̃tɔ̃ syʁ kʁøz], lit. 'Argenton on Creuse') is a commune in the Indre department in central France.

== Geography ==
Argenton-sur-Creuse lies on the river Creuse, about 28 km southwest of Châteauroux. Argenton-sur-Creuse station has rail connections to Vierzon, Limoges and Paris. The A20 autoroute (Vierzon–Limoges–Montauban) passes west of the town. The village of Saint-Benoît-du-Sault is 20 minutes away by road. South of Argenton is the valley of the river Creuse. The village of Gargilesse is nearby; there the home of the writer George Sand may be visited.

== History ==
The modern city is built close to the site of the Gallo-Roman city of Argentomagus which lies a little to the north. The site has been developed as a museum visitor attraction. The name of the ancient town probably derives from the Latin word for "silver", as the town was a center of silver work.

The Encyclopædia Britannica Eleventh Edition (1911) described the city as follows: "The river is crossed by two bridges, and its banks are bordered by picturesque old houses. There are numerous tanneries, and the manufacture of boots, shoes and linen goods is carried on". Since then, one of the riverside mills has been converted into the "Museum of the Shirt and Masculine Elegance".

== Notable people ==
- Antoine Berman (1942-1991), translator and philosopher
- Gilles Clément (born 1943), botanist and writer
- Raymond Rollinat (1859-1931), naturalist
- Germaine Rouillard (1881–1946)
- Michel Sapin (born 1952), politician

== Population ==
Historical population

Year	Pop.	±% p.a.
1793	4,064	—
1821	3,770	−0.27%
1846	4,546	+0.75%
1886	6,388	+0.85%
1911	6,122	−0.17%
1936	5,710	−0.28%
1946	6,111	+0.68%
1962	6,344	+0.23%
1968	6,400	+0.15%

Year	Pop.	±% p.a.
1975	6,424	+0.05%
1982	5,848	−1.33%
1990	5,193	−1.47%
1999	5,146	−0.10%
2007	5,180	+0.08%
2012	5,021	−0.62%
2017	4,927	−0.38%
2023	4,786	−0.48%

Source: EHESS and INSEE (1968-2023)

== See also ==
- Communes of the Indre department
