= SNCF Class Z 7500 =

Class of 60 French electric multiple unit trains

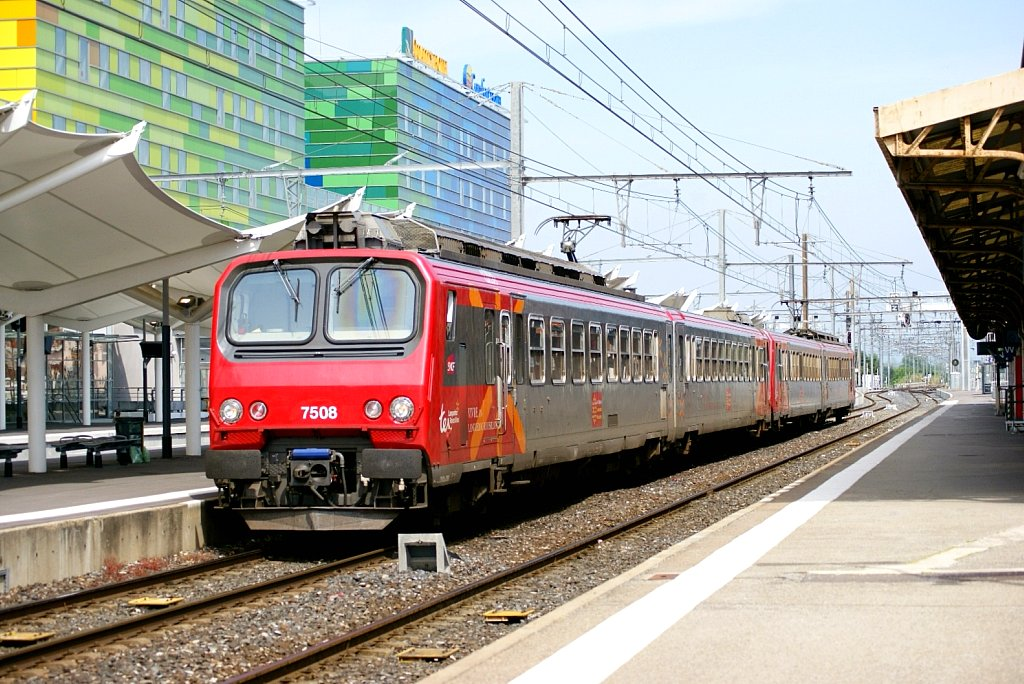
Two Z 5700 two-car units in being worked in multiple at Perpignan station in May 2011.

The SNCF Class Z 7500 is a model of electric multiple unit (EMU) train that was built by De Dietrich Ferroviaire (later a part of Alstom) in 1982–83.
