= 1891 in rail transport =

This article lists events related to rail transport that occurred in 1891.

== Events ==
=== January events ===
- January – First section of the Mexican Southern Railroad opens, from Puebla to Tehuacán.
- January 28 – The railway trades unions of the United Kingdom put out demands for shorter working hours under threat of national strike action.

=== February events ===
- February 9 – A first section of Naples-Samo Commuter Railroad Line, as predecessor for Circumvesuviana Samo Line, Naples to San Giuseppe Vesuviano route officially completed, and regular operation service to start in Campania Region, Italy.

=== April events ===
- April 19 – A fatal collision in Kipton, Ohio between a freight train and a passenger train, attributed to a faulty engineer's pocket watch which stopped for 4 minutes. This accident will become the impetus for the adoption of new quality standards for railroad chronometers in 1893.

=== May events ===
- May 31 NS (=May 19 OS) – In the Kuperovskaya district of Vladivostok, a grand ceremonial inauguration of construction work on the Trans-Siberian Railway is carried out by the Tsesarevich Nikolay Alexandrovich (the future Czar Nicholas II) and a religious service held.

=== June events ===
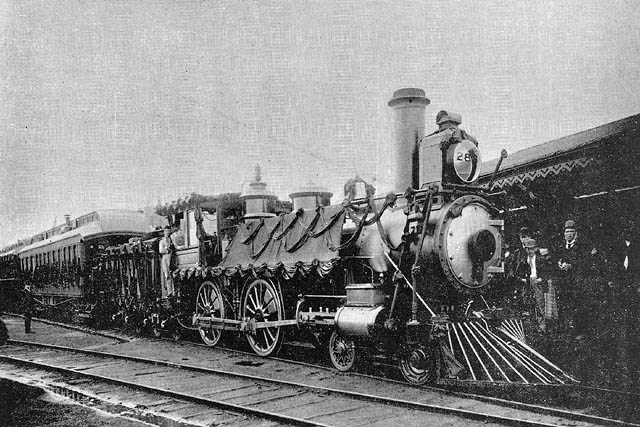
John A. Macdonald's funeral train.

- June 10 – The funeral train for John A. Macdonald, the first Prime Minister of Canada, is operated between Ottawa and Kingston, Ontario.
- June 25 – Kuranda Scenic Railway in Queensland, Australia, opened to passengers.

=== July events ===
- July 1 – The narrow gauge Phillips and Rangeley Railroad opens to Rangeley, Maine.
- July 14 – Tamashima Station, now known as Shin-Kurashiki Station in Kurashiki, Okayama, Japan, is opened.
- July 31 – The Ottawa, Arnprior & Parry Sound Railway is incorporated by John Rudolphus Booth in Ontario, Canada, amalgamating two companies created in 1888, the Ottawa and Parry Sound Railway and the Ottawa Arnprior and Renfrew Railway.

=== September events ===
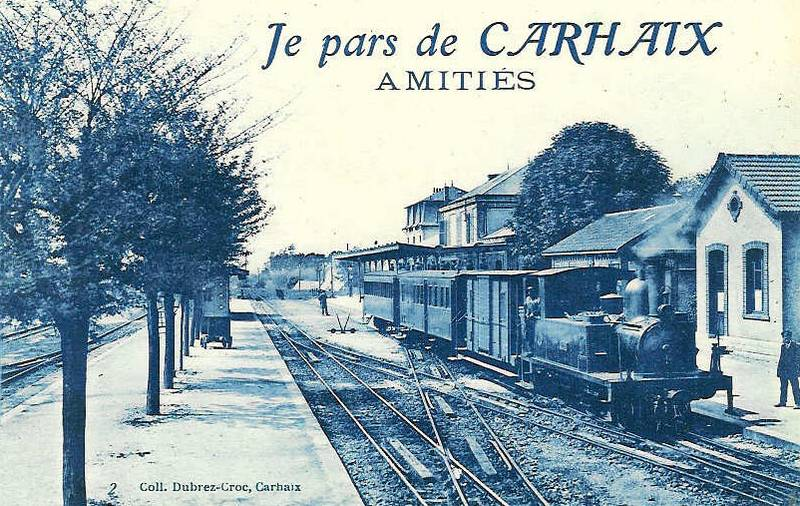
Carhaix station, Réseau Breton.

- September 1 – Nippon Railway Line, Ueno of Tokyo to Aomori route officially complete in Japan.(a predecessor of Tohoku Line, Iwate Galaxy Railway Line and Aoimori Railway Line)
- September 14 – New York Central stages the record breaking run of the Empire State Express between New York City and Buffalo, New York; the train makes the 436 mile (702 km) journey in 7 hours 6 minutes, an average speed of nearly 65 mph (105 km/h).
- September 19 – St. Clair Tunnel between Canada and the United States officially inaugurated (first (freight) train through October 24).
- September 28 – First section of metre gauge Réseau Breton in France opens from the gare de Carhaix.

=== October events ===
- October 20 – First railway in Taiwan opens from Keelung to Taipei.

=== November events ===
- November 30
  - John D. Spreckels incorporates the San Diego Electric Railway Company.
  - Brooks Locomotive Works completes its 2,000th new steam locomotive.

=== December events ===
- December 4 – Great East Thompson Train Wreck: Four trains collide in East Thompson, Connecticut. It is one of the most extensive rail disasters in American history, yet only three people are killed.

=== Unknown date events ===
- Geared steam locomotive designs in the United States: Charles L. Heisler builds a working prototype of what is to become the Heisler locomotive and Rush S. Battles patents the basic design of the Climax locomotive.
- Canadian Pacific Railway launches its trans-Pacific shipping route between Vancouver, British Columbia and Hong Kong.
- The Busk Tunnel Railway Company completes construction of Colorado Midland's Busk–Ivanhoe Tunnel, which will soon replace the Hagerman Tunnel in Colorado.
- Opening of 76 cm narrow gauge railway in Bosnia and Herzegovina linking Sarajevo with the Adriatic over the Ivan Pass using the Abt rack system.
- The first section of mainline railroad in Puerto Rico begins operation between San Juan and Manatí.

== Deaths ==
=== March deaths ===
- March 14 – James Grant, first president of the Chicago, Rock Island and Pacific Railroad, 1851–1854 (b. 1812).

=== August deaths ===
- August 27 – Samuel C. Pomeroy, president of the Atchison, Topeka and Santa Fe Railway 1863–1868 (b. 1816).

=== November deaths ===
- November 6 – J. Gregory Smith, president of Northern Pacific Railway 1866–1872, dies (b. 1818).

=== Unknown date deaths ===
- Moncure Robinson, builder of the Chesterfield Railroad, Philadelphia and Reading Railroad and president of the Richmond, Fredericksburg and Potomac Railroad (b. 1802).
