= Paimpol =

Paimpol Pempoull
- Commune
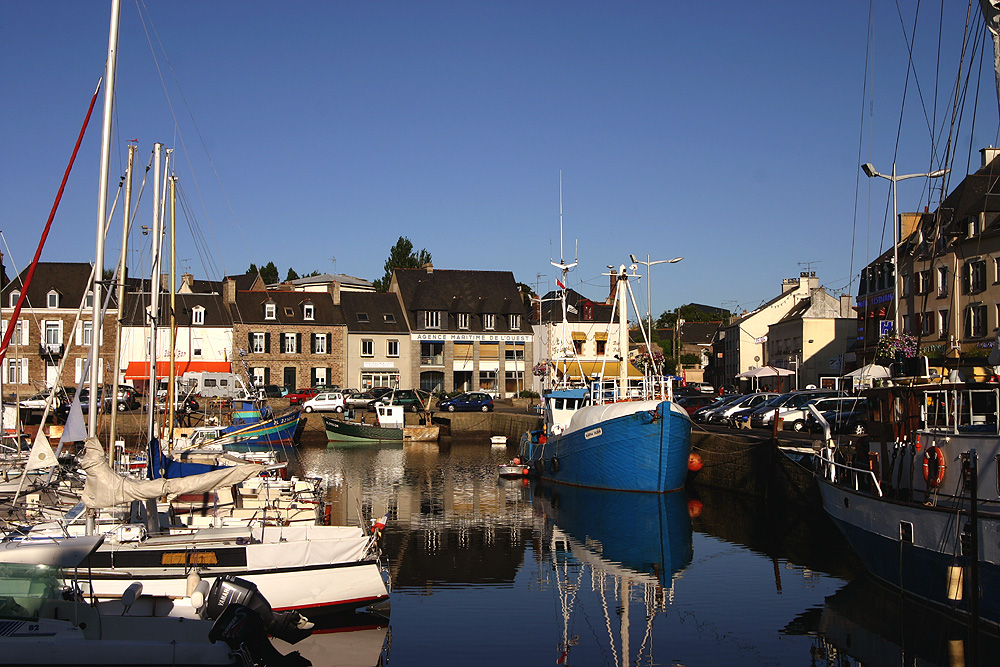
- The harbor

- Flag Coat of arms
- Location of Paimpol
- Location within France Location within Brittany
- Coordinates: 48°46′43″N 3°02′43″W
- Country: France
- Region: Brittany
- Department: Côtes-d'Armor
- Arrondissement: Guingamp
- Canton: Paimpol
- Intercommunality: Guingamp-Paimpol Agglomération

Government
  - Mayor (2020–2026): Fanny Chappé
- Area^{1}: 23.61 km^{2} (9.12 sq mi)
- Highest elevation: 86 m (282 ft)
- Lowest elevation: 0 m (0 ft)
- Population (2023): 7,341
  - Density: 310.9/km^{2} (805.3/sq mi)
- Time zone: UTC+01:00 (CET)
  - Summer (DST): UTC+02:00 (CEST)
- INSEE/Postal code: 22162 /22500
- ^{1} French Land Register data, which excludes lakes, ponds, glaciers > 1 km^{2} (0.386 sq mi or 247 acres) and river estuaries.

Paimpol (French pronunciation: [pɛ̃pɔl]; Breton: Pempoull) is a commune in the Côtes-d'Armor department in Brittany in northwest France.

It is a popular tourist destination, particularly during the summer months when visitors are drawn to its port and beaches.

== Geography ==
The town is located in the north of Brittany, at the western end of the bay of Saint-Brieuc, at the bottom of the bay of Paimpol.

The town is on the old national road D 786, 72 mi west of Saint-Malo, 23 mi north-west of Saint-Brieuc, 21 mi east of Lannion (sub-prefecture) and 44 mi to the north-east of Morlaix . Guingamp (sub-prefecture) is 18 mi to the south, and Rennes is 88 mi to the south-east.

== Population ==
Inhabitants of Paimpol are called paimpolais in French. In 1960 Paimpol absorbed the former communes Kerity and Plounez. The population data given in the table below for 1954 and earlier refer to Paimpol proper, without Kerity and Plounez.

Historical population

| Year | Pop. | ±% p.a. |
|---|---|---|
| 1793 | 1,748 | — |
| 1800 | 1,679 | −0.57% |
| 1806 | 1,849 | +1.62% |
| 1821 | 1,900 | +0.18% |
| 1831 | 2,108 | +1.04% |
| 1836 | 2,012 | −0.93% |
| 1841 | 2,043 | +0.31% |
| 1846 | 2,076 | +0.32% |
| 1851 | 2,136 | +0.57% |
| 1856 | 2,032 | −0.99% |
| 1861 | 2,116 | +0.81% |
| 1866 | 2,166 | +0.47% |
| 1872 | 2,017 | −1.18% |
| 1876 | 2,035 | +0.22% |
| 1881 | 2,363 | +3.03% |
| 1886 | 2,211 | −1.32% |
| 1891 | 2,213 | +0.02% |
| 1896 | 2,473 | +2.25% |
| 1901 | 2,737 | +2.05% |

| Year | Pop. | ±% p.a. |
|---|---|---|
| 1906 | 2,805 | +0.49% |
| 1911 | 2,873 | +0.48% |
| 1921 | 2,802 | −0.25% |
| 1926 | 2,690 | −0.81% |
| 1931 | 2,671 | −0.14% |
| 1936 | 2,528 | −1.09% |
| 1946 | 2,781 | +0.96% |
| 1954 | 2,795 | +0.06% |
| 1962 | 7,713 | +13.53% |
| 1968 | 7,723 | +0.02% |
| 1975 | 8,176 | +0.82% |
| 1982 | 7,994 | −0.32% |
| 1990 | 7,856 | −0.22% |
| 1999 | 7,932 | +0.11% |
| 2007 | 7,756 | −0.28% |
| 2012 | 7,293 | −1.22% |
| 2017 | 7,172 | −0.33% |
| 2023 | 7,341 | +0.39% |

Source: EHESS and INSEE (1968-2023)

== Breton language ==
The municipality launched a linguistic plan through Ya d'ar brezhoneg on 29 September 2008.

In 2008, 11.8% of primary school children attended bilingual schools.

== Transport ==
Paimpol station is connected by trains to Guingamp station on the Paris-Montparnasse–Brest line.

== Sights ==
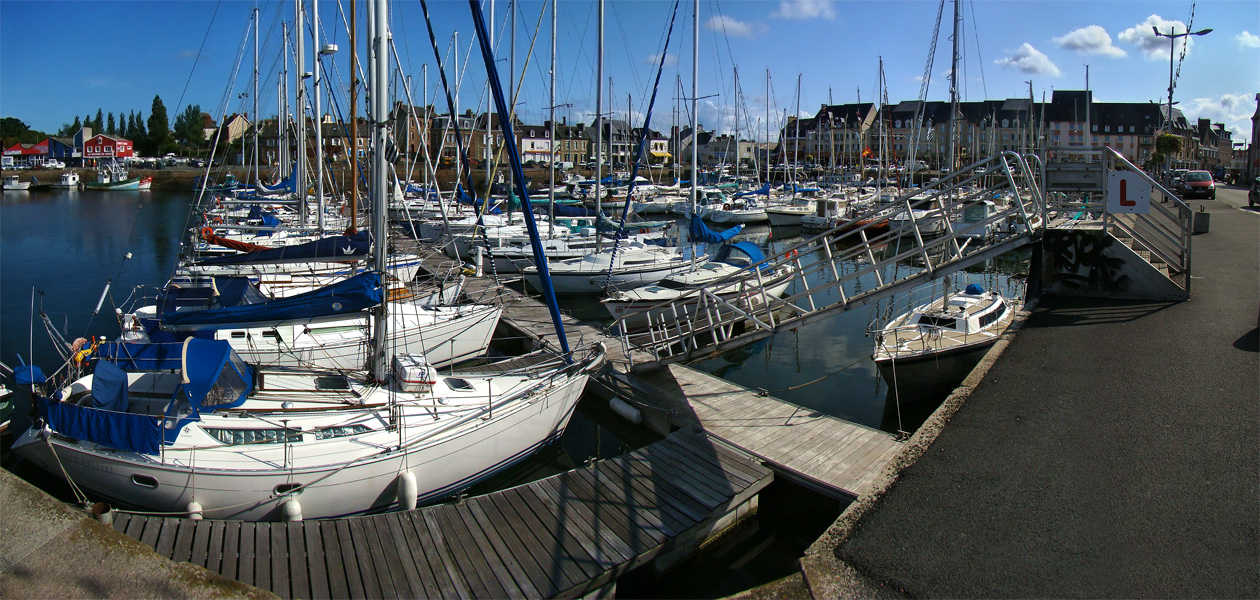
The port

Blue and white striped-jumpers are visible in the streets and are seen to reflect not only their pride in all things to do with the sea, but also in their région, Brittany.

The town centre leads from the port down to the coast, through cobbled streets filled with restaurants, cafés and bars. The town centre includes the Quartier Latin. It was at La place du Martray that Pierre Loti chose to put the house of Gaud, the heroine of his novel Pêcheur d'Islande. The attractions of the town are also a major theme of Guy Ropartz's opera Le Pays and Théodore Botrel's song La Paimpolaise.

Other popular tourist sights include Beauport Abbey dating back to 1202, and the chapels of Lanvignec, Ste Barbe and Kergrist. L'île de Bréhat is a rocky archipelago 10 minutes by ferry from the coast next to Paimpol. It is made up of two large islands connected by a bridge, and numerous smaller ones.

Other places of interest in the area include the Moulin de Craca and Circuit de falaises in Plouézec, as well as Pors-Even and the Tour de Kerroc'h in Ploubazlanec.

The Monument to Théodore Botrel in Paimpol is by Pierre Charles Lenoir

The monument aux morts has sculpture by André César Vermare

== Events ==
Paimpol hosts a weekly Tuesday morning market and seasonal night markets. The town has also hosted "Mardi du port", a series of live music performances near the harbour.

Paimpol is also home to the bi-annual "Festival du chant de marin" (sea shanty festival) which attracts thousands of visitors over three days in August.

== Gallery ==
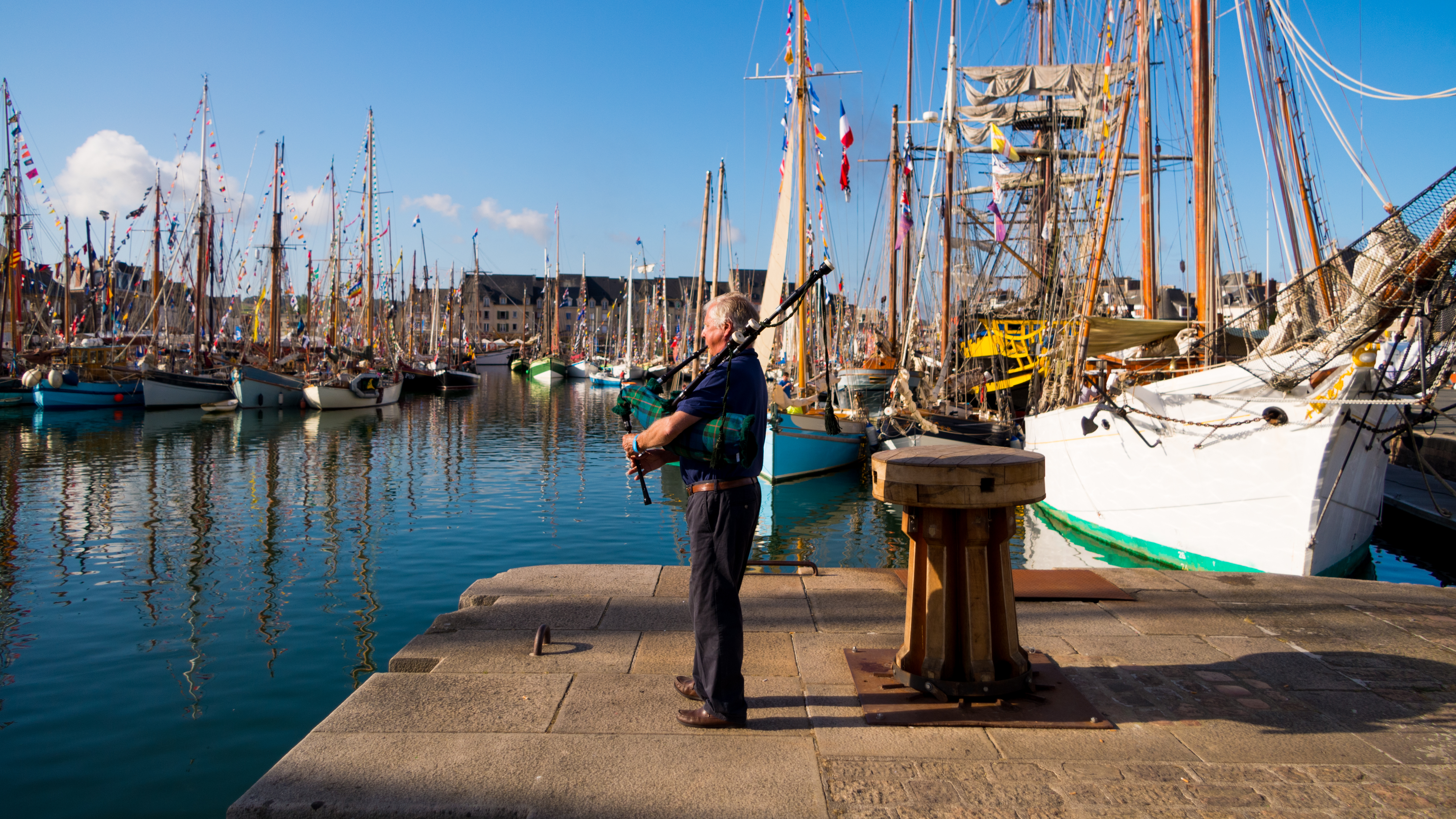
A man plays bagpipe in the harbour, during the international Celtic "Festival du chant de marin"

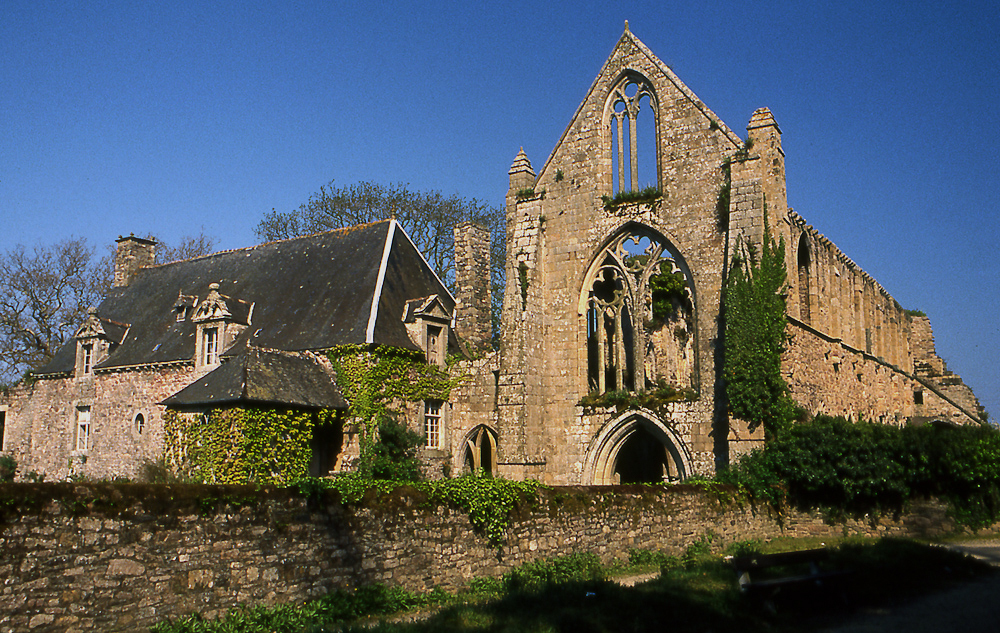
Beauport Abbey

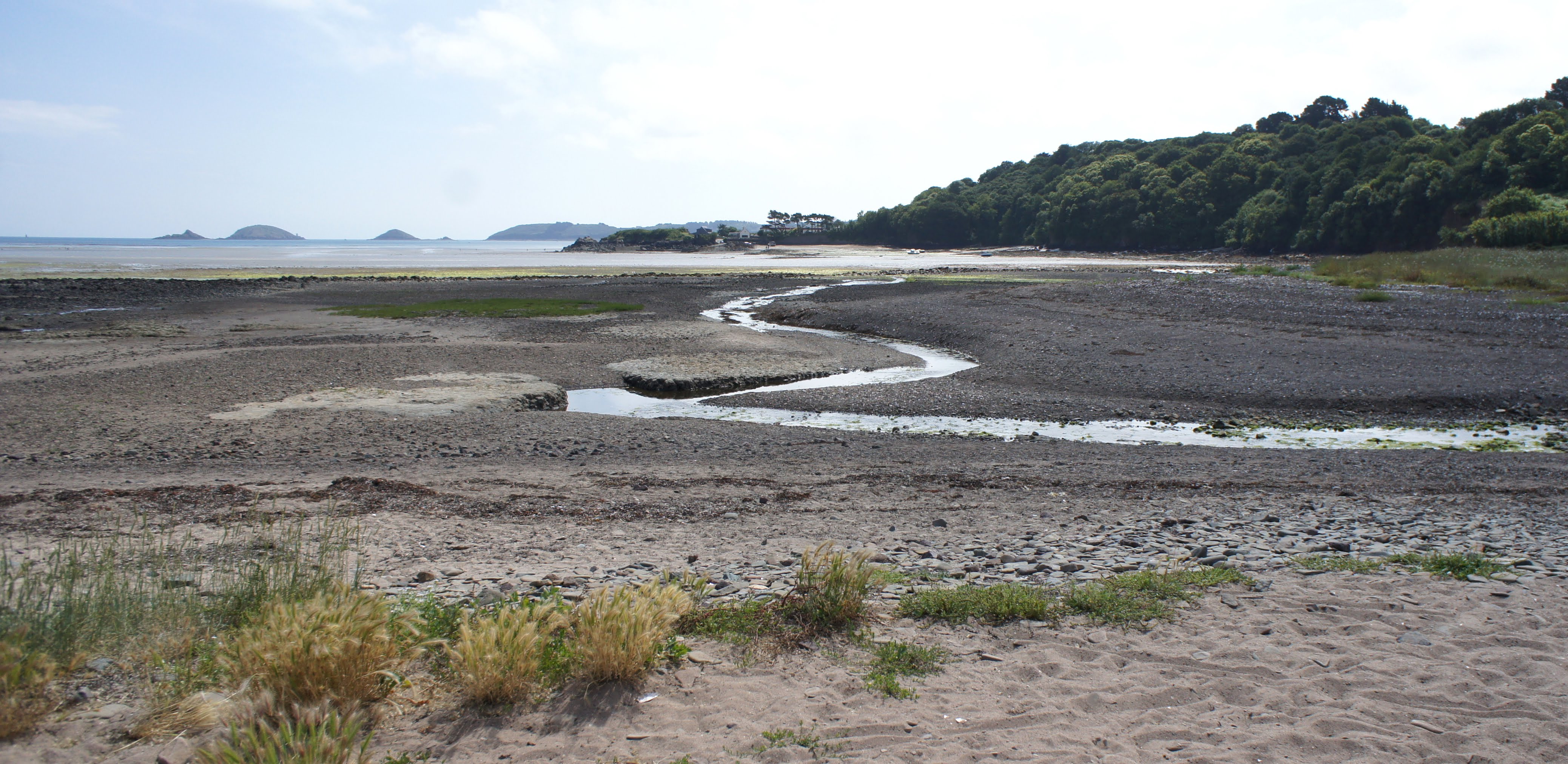
Beauport bay at low tide

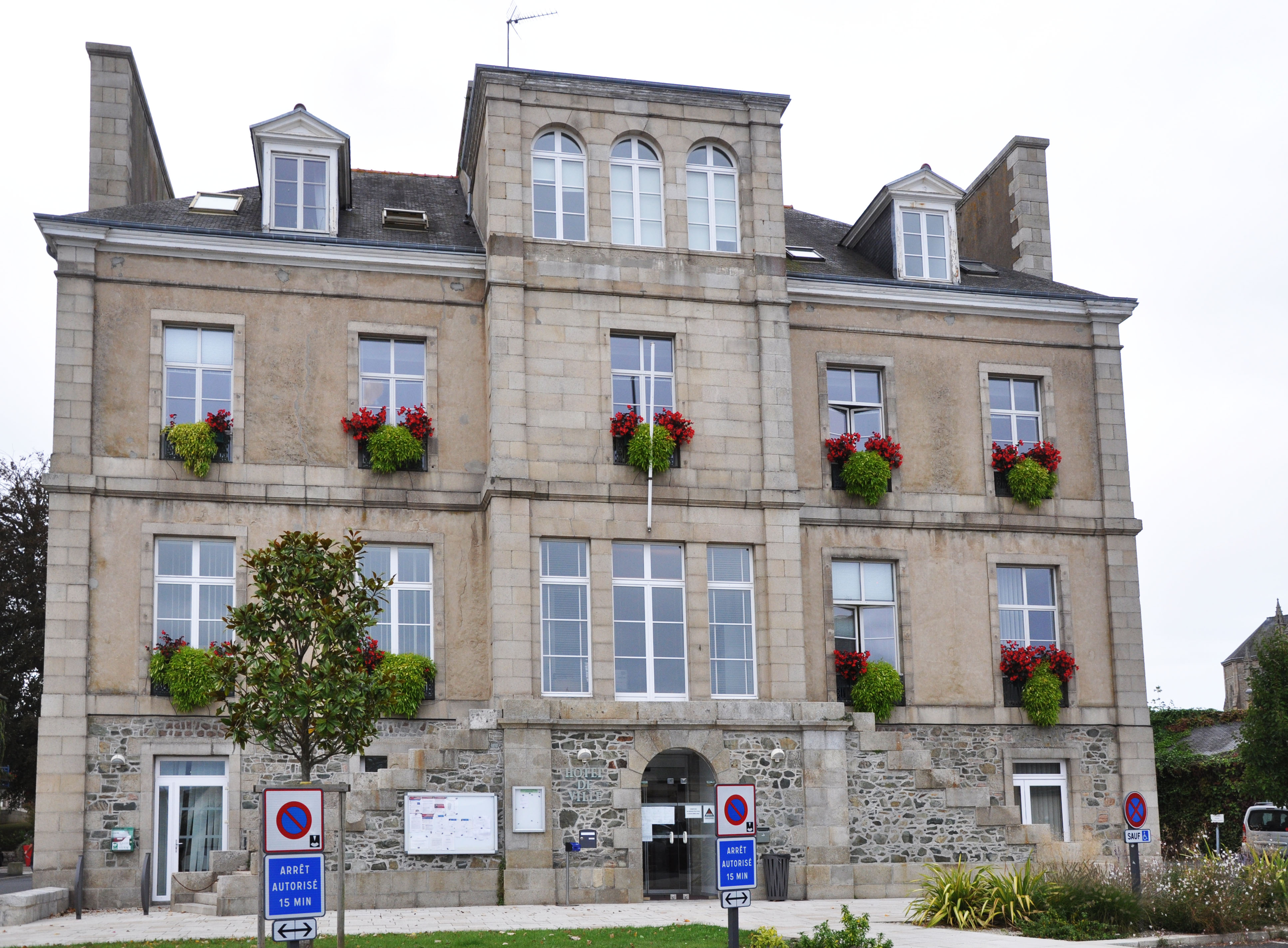
Town hall

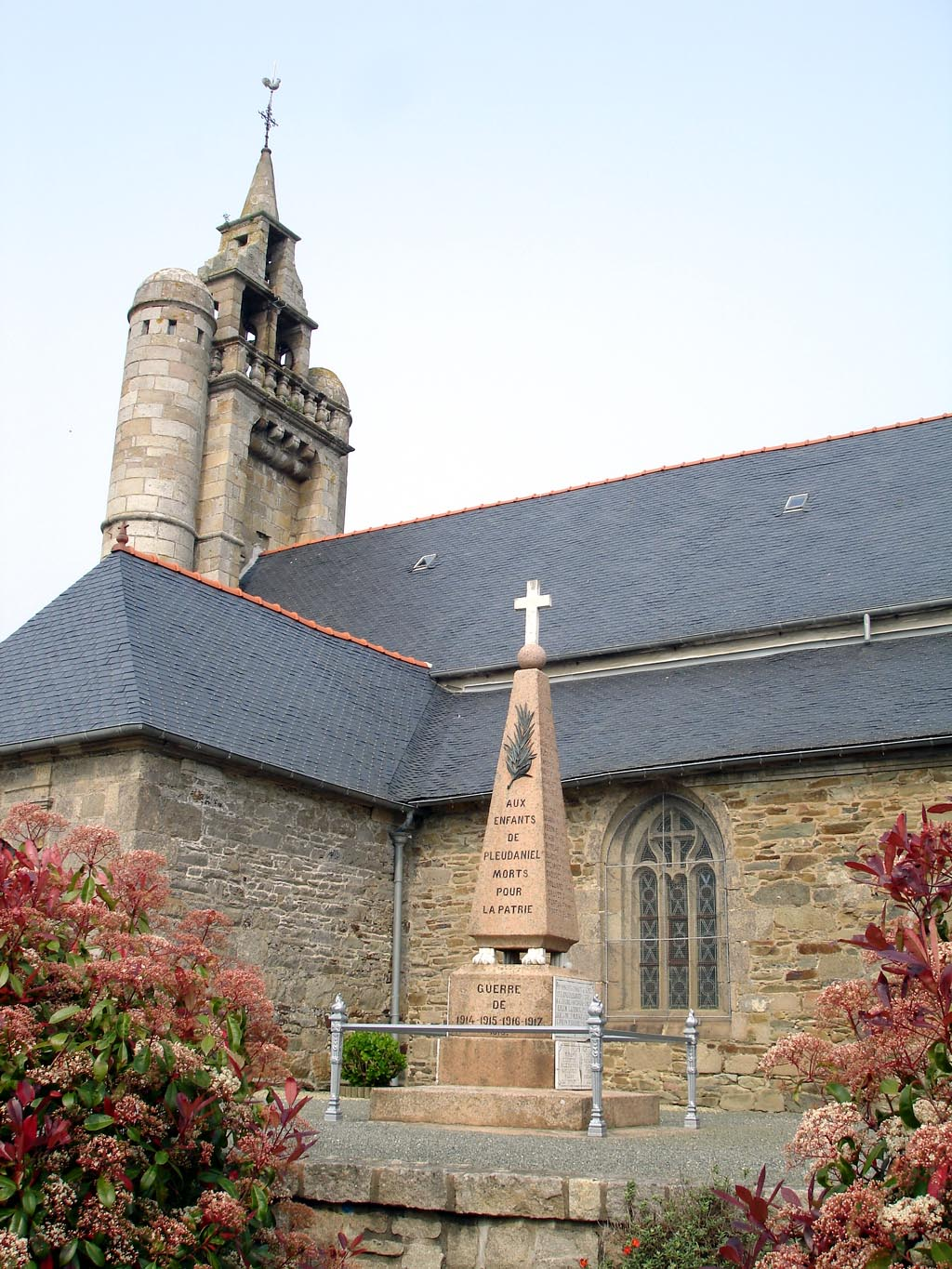
Pleudaniel church

== International relations ==
The following towns are twinned with Paimpol:

- Grundarfjörður, Iceland
- Romsey, United Kingdom
- Vermilion, United States

== See also ==
- Communes of the Côtes-d'Armor department
