= Réseau Breton =

Map of rail infrastructure in Brittany

The Réseau Breton (French pronunciation: [ʁezo bʁətɔ̃], RB) is a 1,435 mm (4 ft 8 1/2 in), standard gauge, and former 1,000 mm (3 ft 3 3/8 in), metre gauge, railway in Finistère, France, with a few kilometres of line in Côtes d'Armor, Ille-et-Vilaine and Morbihan. The hub of the system was Carhaix. The metre gauge lines were built with the capacity to be easily converted to standard gauge if necessary.

== History ==
=== Background ===
Brittany in the mid nineteenth century was a largely agricultural area. the quarrying of slate and granite also took place. Forests in inland areas had previously supplied timber for construction of buildings and shipbuilding at the larger coastal ports, but this industry had largely declined as the source material was exhausted and the land turned over to agriculture. Apart from roads, the first transportation system constructed in Brittany was the Canal de Nantes à Brest, started in 1811 and completed in 1842. Although the canal could carry high volumes of freight, it was slow, relying on horse-drawn barges.

=== Railways ===
The first standard gauge railways in Brittany were the Chemin de fer de Paris à Orléans (CF PO) line from Paris to Quimper, which was completed in 1863 and the Chemins de fer de l'Ouest (CF de l'Ouest) line from Paris to Brest, which was completed in 1865. The CF PO built a line from Quimper to Châteaulin and Landerneau, where it connected with the CF PO. This line was completed in 1867. The CF PO built a line from Auray to Pontivy, which was completed in 1864. In 1872, the CF de l'Ouest built a line from Saint Brieuc to Pontivy, where it connected with the CF PO line. These lines left central Brittany an area devoid of railways, and served only by the Canal de Nantes à Brest.

In 1880, the concession to build an Intérêt Générale system in Brittany was given to the CF de l'Ouest. It was agreed that the lines would be built to metre gauge, but provision would be made for conversion to standard gauge should the need arise. Morlaix would be the administrative headquarters, but Carhaix would be the main station, with engineering workshops, locomotive depôt and carriage workshops. The first line opened in 1891 and further extensions until 1925 gave the network a total length of 428 kilometres (266 mi) of metre gauge line. The lines closed to passengers in 1939, but with the replacement buses being requisitioned at the outbreak of the Second World War the passenger service was resumed, with a couple of trips daily on each line. The RB saw an increase in freight traffic, being used to transport materials for the Atlantic Wall. After the war, passenger services were gradually withdrawn, and all metre gauge lines closed on 9 April 1967 with the section between Carhaix - Paimpol having been converted to dual gauge in 1924 and converted to standard gauge in 1953, and Carhaix - Guingamp, closed in February 1967 for conversion to standard gauge later in 1967, remaining open.

== Lines ==
=== Metre gauge ===
The metre gauge lines of the RB were:-

==== Carhaix – Morlaix ====
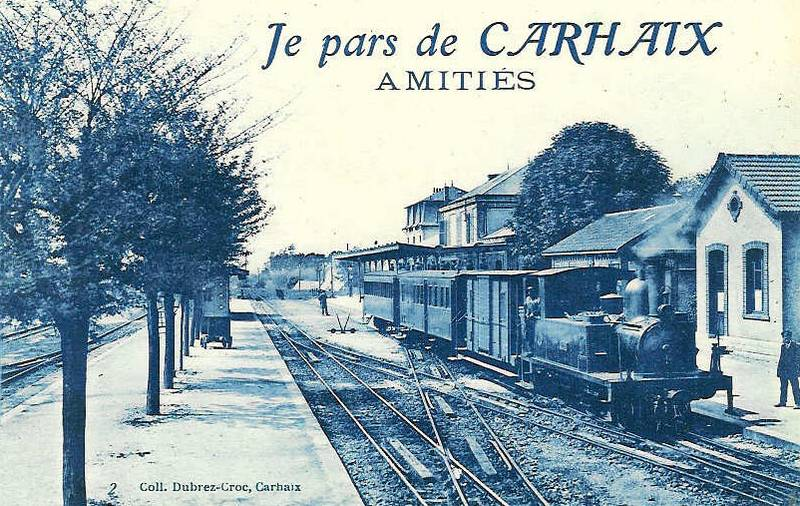
Carhaix station, c.1900

The 49-kilometre (30 mi) line from Carhaix to Morlaix opened on 28 September 1891. Carhaix station was the headquarters of the RB. All five lines that made up the main RB system originated from Carhaix. The station is located to the east of the town. In common with many of the station on the RB, Carhaix was architecturally similar to may CF de l'Ouest stations.

The lines of the RB were mainly built with Moroccan labour. Many of the stations were not in the settlements they purported to serve. Often a double-barrelled name indicated that the station lay between two places. Leaving Carhaix, the railway shared the trackbed with the line to Guingamp until it curved to the left and crossed the D787 road. The first station was Plounézéval Halte, (5.6 km (3.5 mi)). The halt actually stood in Le Frostel, some 2.5 km (1.6 mi) from Plounézéval. Pouallaouen (10.8 km (6.7 mi)) was the next station. The Ulne was crossed on a high stone arch bridge before Huelgoat-Locmaria (15.8 km (9.8 mi)) was reached. This station stood in Locmaria-Berrien and was some (6 km (3.7 mi)) from Huelgoat. The d'Argent was crossed by a steel bridge before Kervallon Halte (19.8 km (12.3 mi)) was reached. Here, the line passed to the east of the Forêt Domaniale de St-Ambrose. Scrignac-Berrien station (23.6 km (14.7 mi)) was about (5 km (3.1 mi)) from Scrignac and Berrien. Kermarzin (27 km (17 mi)) and Le Cloître-Lannéanou (32.8 km (20.4 mi)) stations were followed by the summit of the line (over 210 metres (690 ft)) before Ploungonven-Plourin (39.5 km (24.5 mi)) was reached.

At Morlaix the line was shared with the CF de l'Ouest's standard gauge dual gauge line between Paris and Brest. A dual gauge section of track was laid on the up line on the viaduct across the harbour. This was built by the CF de l'Ouest as part of their Paris - Brest line. The viaduct crossed the Chemins de fer armoricains (CFA) Morlaix - Plestin-les-Grèves line. A platform at Morlaix was shared with the standard gauge. A branch was opened on 12 February 1906 to serve the port at Morlaix. Freight traffic beyond Plougonver ceased from 25 September 1962. The line between Carhaix and Morlaix closed completely on 9 April 1967.

==== Carhaix – Paimpol ====
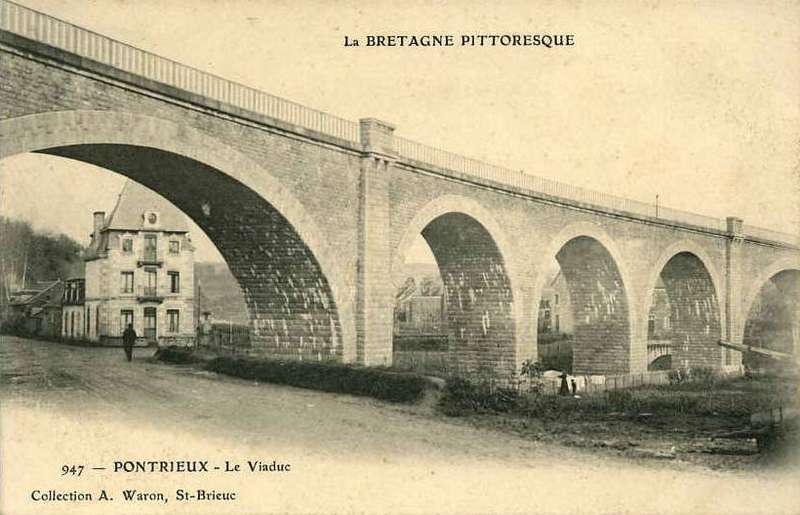
Viaduct at Pontrieux

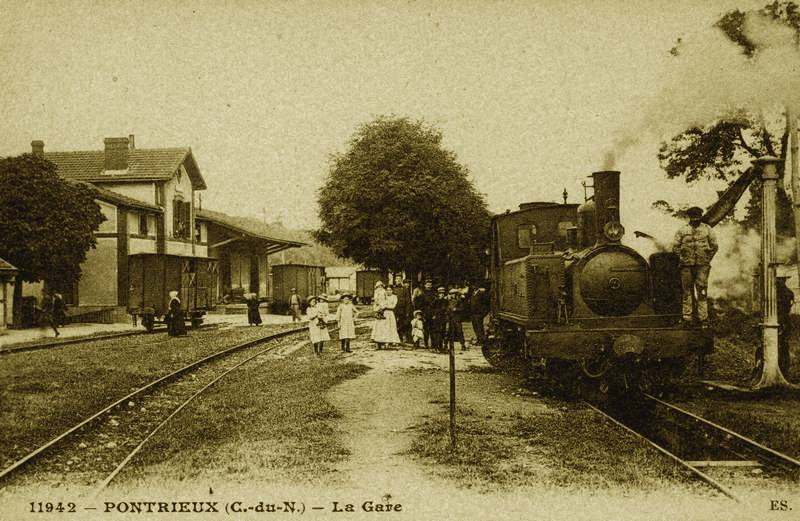
Pontrieux station, 1900

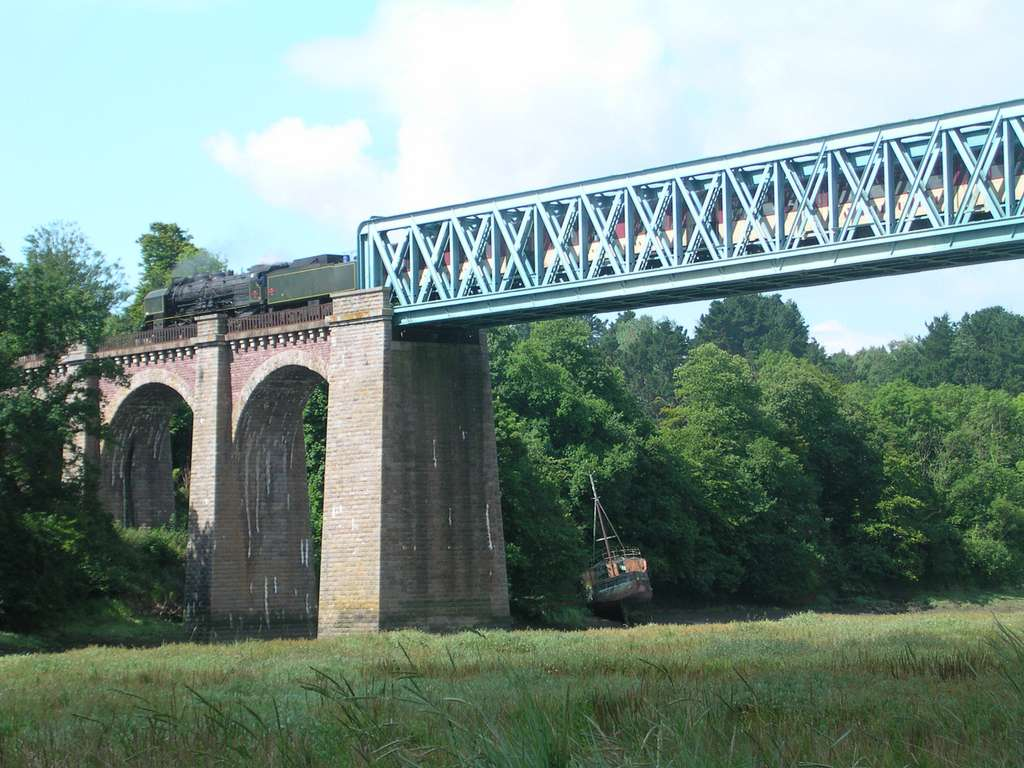
The bridge at Frynadour

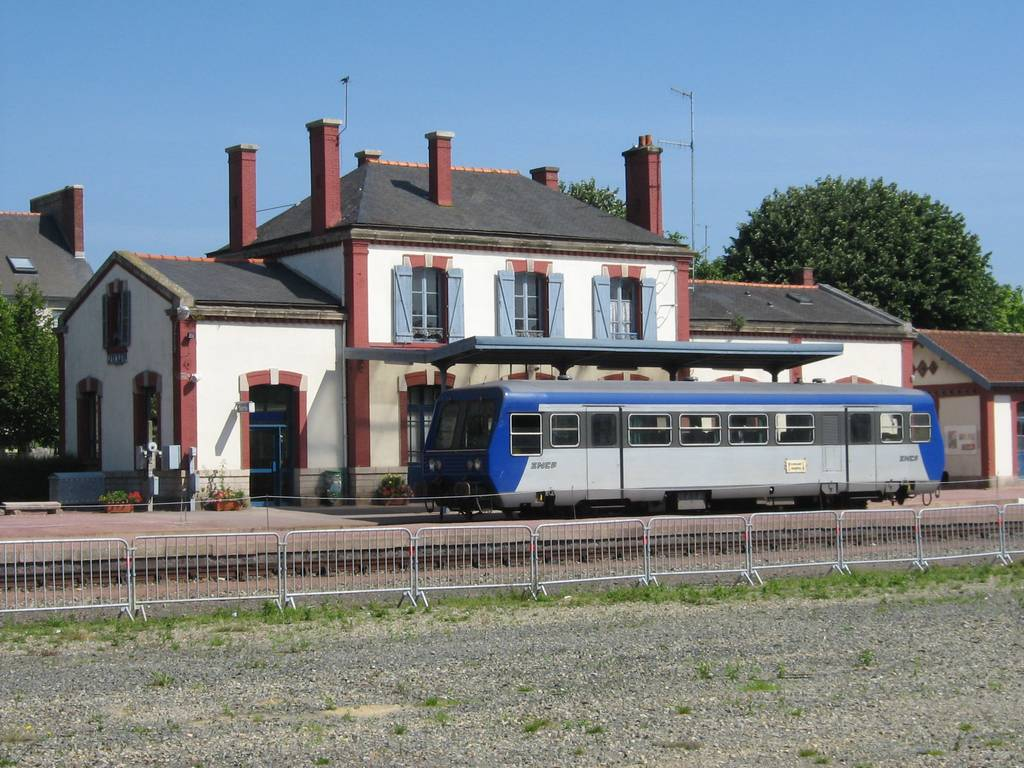
Paimpol station, 2006. Soulé A2E railcar visible.

The 53-kilometre (33 mi) line from Carhaix to Guingamp opened on 24 September 1893, and was extended a further 37 km (23 mi) to Paimpol on 14 August 1894. The line between Guingamp and Paimpol was converted to dual gauge in the early 1920s with the addition of a third rail for standard gauge traffic. The standard gauge line opened to traffic on 24 May 1924. When the extra rail was added, gangs started from each end of the line, laying the extra rail to the left as they were facing the line. They met near Lancerf, where an arrangement had to be arranged to allow the metre gauge track to switch sides. This was known as the Sauterelle (English: Grasshopper), the term being a corruption of saut rail (English: to jump the rails). The sauterelle had to be approached slowly. In 1953, the metre gauge rail was removed between Guingamp and Paimpol, the line operating as standard gauge since then. The metre gauge line between Carhaix and Guingamp closed on 14 February 1967, re-opening as a standard gauge line on 3 July 1967.

The first station is Carnoët-Locarn (5.6 km (3.5 mi)), the station being nowhere near either village. Le Plenity Halte (13 km (8.1 mi)) is next. Although plans were made to upgrade this to station status and provide full facilities, these were not carried out. Callac (20.3 km (12.6 mi)) is next, followed by Le Mais Halte (25.2 km (15.7 mi)). Plougonver (29.6 km (18.4 mi)) and Pont Melvez (34.5 km (21.4 mi)) stations are followed by Coat-Guégen Halte (37.8 km (23.5 mi)). Moustéru station (42.1 km (26.2 mi)) is the last before Guingamp (53.3 km (33.1 mi)). At Guingamp there were loco sheds and facilities to service metre and standard gauge rolling stock. There is a connection with the standard gauge Paris - Brest line.

Guingamp station had a connection with the Chemin de fer des Côtes-du-Nord (CdN) Guingamp - Plouha and Guingamp - St. Nicolas du Pélem lines. Gourland station (55.8 km (34.7 mi)) is next, followed by Trégonneau-Squiffec (63.3 km (39.3 mi)) then Brélidy-Plouëc (68.6 km (42.6 mi)), which is nearer to La Belle Eglise than Brélidy or Plouëc de Trieux. Plouëc had a connection with the CdN Plouëc - Tréguier line. Leaving Brélidy-Plouec, the line heads for the Trieux. After leaving Pontrieux Halte (73.8 km (45.9 mi)), the Trieux is crossed by a six-arch viaduct before Pontrieux (74.9 km (46.5 mi)) is reached. A branch here served the port. The Leff is crossed by a steel bridge on the approach to Frynadour (79.6 km (49.5 mi)). Lancherf (84.3 km (52.4 mi)) and Plounez (87.4 km (54.3 mi)) are next, before the terminus at Paimpol Station (90.2 km (56.0 mi)). A branch at Paimpol served the port. Next to the RB station was a CdN station which served the Paimpol - Tréguier and Paimpol - Plouha lines. The CdN line between Paimpol and Tréguier crossed the branch to the port on a flat crossing.

==== Carhaix – Rosporden ====
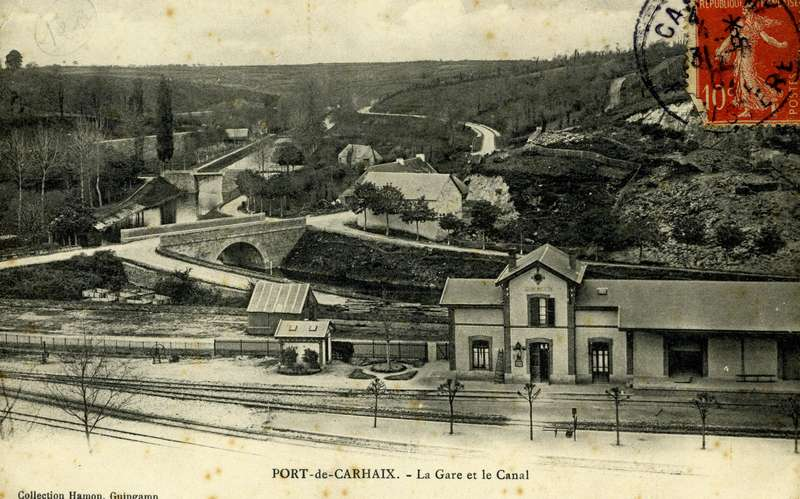
Port de Carhaix, 1900

The 49.75-kilometre (30.91 mi) line from Carhaix to Rosporden opened on 2 August 1896. Leaving Carhaix, the N164 Angers - Brest road was crossed by a skew bridge. The railway crossed the Canal de Nantes à Brest before Port de Carhaix station (5.7 km (3.5 mi)) was reached. On leaving Port de Carhaix, the D769 road was crossed. Motreff (12.9 km (8.0 mi)) was the next station. It was (1.5 kilometres (0.9 mi)) from the town. Gourin station (20 km (12 mi)) was also the terminus of the Chemins de fer du Morbihan (CM) line to Meslan, although there was no direct link here between the two networks. Kerbiquet (25.5 km (15.8 mi)) was the next station, then Guiscriff (31.6 km (19.6 mi)), Scaër (37.1 km (23.1 mi)) and Coatloc'h (42.1 km (26.2 mi)) stations were followed by Kerneval Halte (46.3 km (28.8 mi)) before Rosporden station (49.75 km (30.91 mi)) was reached. Rosporden station had a connection with the standard gauge Chemin de fer de Paris à Orléans (CF PO) Savernay - Landerneau line and there was an end-on junction with the CFA Rosporden - Landivisiau line.

==== Carhaix – La Brohinière ====
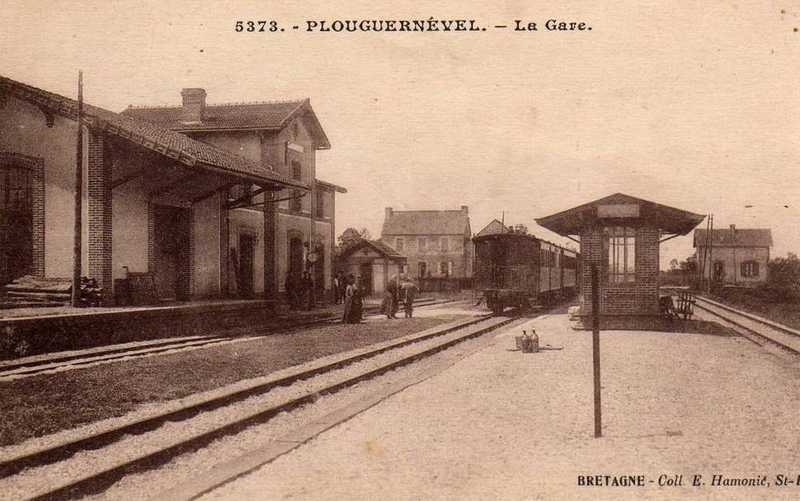
Plouguernével, 1910

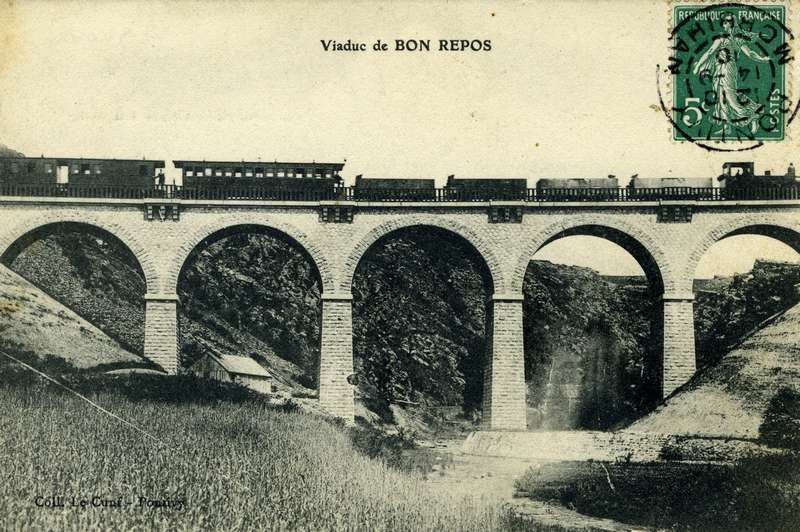
Bon Repos viaduct, 1900

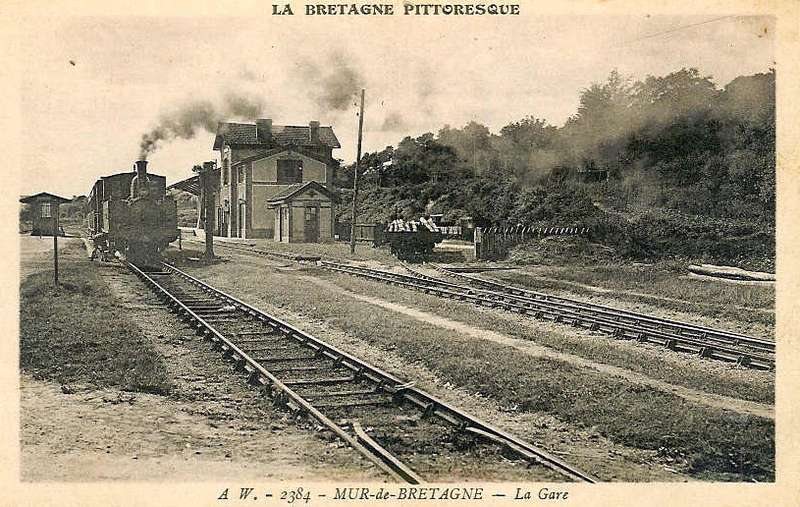
Mûr de Bretagne, 1910

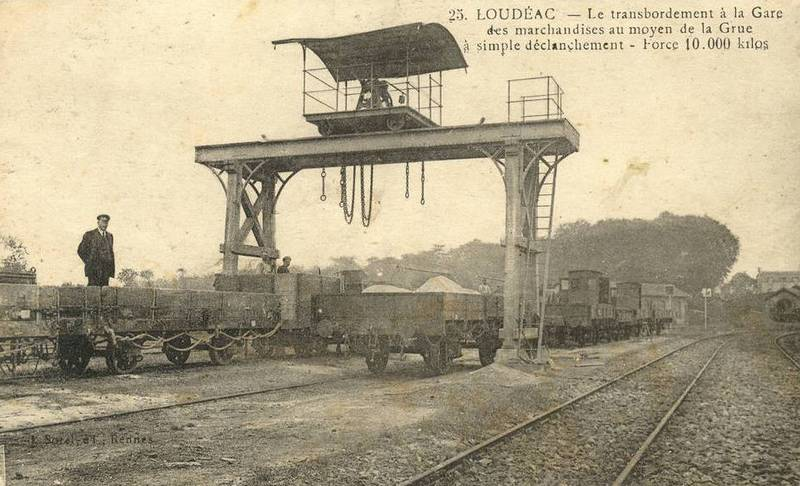
Loudéac, 1910

The almost 130-kilometre (81 mi) long line from Carhaix to La Brohinière opened in sections between 1898 and 1904. Carhaix - Rostrenen opened on 15 May 1898. Rostrenen - St. Lubin-le-Vaublanc opened on 17 August 1904. St. Lubin-le-Vaublanc - Loudéac opened on 1 October 1904. Loudéac - La Brohinière opened on 12 August 1907. The line between Loudéac and La Brohinière closed to passengers in October 1953. The line closed entirely on 9 April 1967.

Leaving Carhaix, the line initially ran parallel to the Morlaix and Guingamp lines before climbing and heading east when the other two line curved away to the left. The line crossed the D20 road then followed the D49 road. Trébrivan - Le Moustoir Halte (6.5 km (4.0 mi)) was the first stop, followed by Maël Carhaix (12 km (7.5 mi)). On leaving Maël Carhaix, the line followed the D23 road. La Croix Madelaine Halte (17.3 km (10.7 mi)) was followed by Rostrenen (21.5 km (13.4 mi)). Rostrenen was the terminus of the CdN line from Saint-Nicolas-du-Pélem, the Cdn station was adjacent to the RB station. Plouguernével (27.2 km (16.9 mi)) was the next station. The Blavet was crossed by a steel girder bridge before Gouarec station (33.6 km (20.9 mi)) was reached. A branch was opened on 1 June 1912 serving the port at Gouarec.

Bon Repos Halte (37.7 km (23.4 mi)) and Saint Gelven Halte (41.8 km (26.0 mi)) were followed by Caurel (45.7 km (28.4 mi)). Here, the railway ran high above the Lac de Guerlédan. At Mûr de Bretagne (50.7 km (31.5 mi)), a branch served a quarry. After closure, the section of trackbed between Caurel and Mûr de Bretagne was used for the short-lived 5 km (3.1 mi) long Réseau Guerlédan, which opened on 2 July 1978. The next stations were St Guen (55.3 km (34.4 mi)) and St Caradec (64.6 km (40.1 mi)). Loudéac station (71.2 km (44.2 mi)) was shared with the CF de l'Ouest, lying on that company's St Brieuc - Pontivy line. The CdN line from Plémy also terminated at Loudéac. Full facilities were provided here, the turntable being a dual gauge one, shared with the CF de l'Ouest.

Leaving Loudéac, the line crossed the standard gauge CF de l'Ouest line on the level. Ganland Halte (76.5 km (47.5 mi)) was followed by La Chèze St Barnabé (80.5 km (50.0 mi)), Plémet La Prénassaye (85.1 km (52.9 mi)) and St Lubin le Vaublanc (87.4 km (54.3 mi)) stations. Le Carguier Halte (91.2 km (56.7 mi)) was followed by Laurenan (94.7 km (58.8 mi)), Merdrignac (104 km (65 mi)) and Trémorel (113.95 km (70.81 mi)) stations. After Loscouet Halte (116.9 km (72.6 mi)), the CF de l'Ouest's La Brohinière - Ploërmel line was crossed on the level before St Meén station (122.7 km (76.2 mi)) was reached. The RB then ran parallel to the CF de l'Ouest. Le Crouais Halte (126.6 km (78.7 mi)) was followed by the terminus at La Brohinière (129.3 km (80.3 mi)), where there was a connection with the CF de l'Ouest's Paris - Brest line.

==== Carhaix – Camaret ====
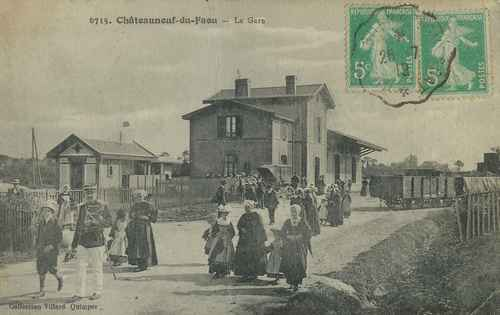
Châteauneuf du Faon, 1900

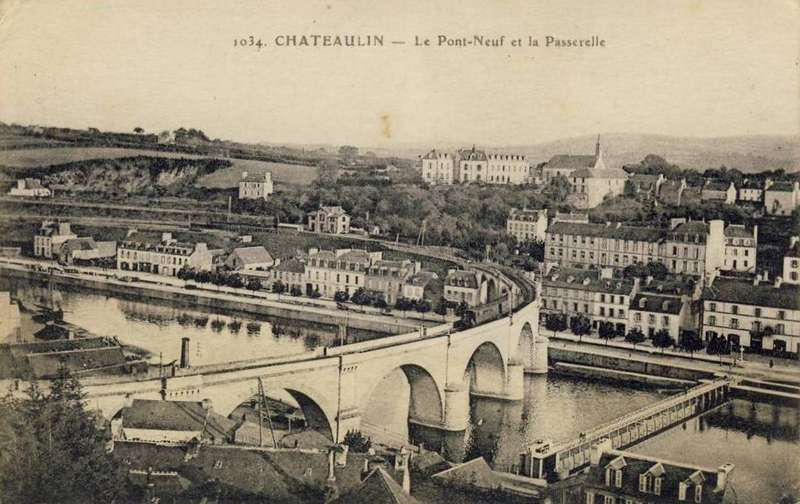
Châteaulin viaduct, 1910

The 109-kilometre (68 mi) line from Carhaix to Camaret opened in stages between 1893 and 1925, bringing the total extent of the RB to 428 km (266 mi). Carhaix - Pleyben opened on 30 August 1904. Pleyben - Châteaulin Ville opened on 4 August 1906. Châteaulin Ville - Châteaulin Gare opened on 11 August 1907. Châteaulin Gare - Crozon-Morgat opened on 13 August 1923. Crozon-Morgat - Camaret and Le Fret opened on 14 June 1925. Châteaulin Gare station had a connection with the CF PO Savernay - Landerneau line. The line between Perros St. Fiacre and Le Fret closed to passengers in May 1946.

Between Carhaix and Port de Carhaix, the line ran parallel to the Carhaix - Rosporden line. This gave the impression of double track, but was operated as two separate single track lines. Leaving Port de Carhaix (5.7 km (3.5 mi)), the line crossed the D769 road and then followed the Canal du Nantes à Brest until St Hernin - Cléden Halte 11.9 km (7.4 mi)) was reached. The canal was followed until Spézet-Landeleau station 16.7 km (10.4 mi)), after which the Aulne was crossed by a long steel bridge. The railway then began its ascent of the Monts d'Arreé. Kerivarc'h Halte 22.3 km (13.9 mi)) was followed by Châteauneuf du Faou 27.9 km (17.3 mi)), where the RB station lay alongside the CA station, which was on the CA's Landivisiau - Rosporden line. Leaving Châteauneuf du Faou, Langelet Halte 31.9 km (19.8 mi)) was followed by Lennon station 35.6 km (22.1 mi)) before Pleyben 41.1 km (25.5 mi)) was reached.

Saint Segal station 47.9 km (29.8 mi)) was followed by Port Launay 51.8 km (32.2 mi)), where the railway joined the Aulne, running along its east bank to Châteaulin Ville station 54.4 km (33.8 mi)), which was shared with the CF PO. Châteaulin Ville was on the CF PO Quimper - Landernau line. Leaving Châteaulin Ville, the RB line crossed the Aulne on a curving eleven-arch viaduct before Châteaulin Embranchement station 56.9 km (35.4 mi)) was reached. Here, the goods facilities were separated from the RB line by the standard gauge PO line.

Leaving Châteauneuf Embranchement, the D887 road was crossed by a high arch bridge. Kerhillac Halte 64.5 km (40.1 mi)) was followed by Plomodiern-Ploéven station 69.9 km (43.4 mi)). St Nicolas Pentrez station 75.6 km (47.0 mi)) was followed by Argol Halte 80.5 km (50.0 mi)) before Telgruc 83.1 km (51.6 mi)) and Tal-ar-Groas 89.1 km (55.4 mi)) stations were followed by Crozon-Morgat station 94.65 km (58.81 mi)). The next station was Perros-St Fiacre 99.4 km (61.8 mi)), which was the junction for the 3.6 km (2.2 mi)) branch to Le Fret, 103 km (64 mi)) from Carhaix. The main line continued to Penfrat Halte 102.7 km (63.8 mi)) before terminating at Camaret-sur-Mer, 105 km (65 mi)) from Carhaix.

=== Standard gauge ===
==== Pont-l'Abbé – Saint-Guénolé ====
The line between Pont-l'Abbé and Saint-Guénolé, built to metre gauge, had been opened by the Chemins de fer départementaux du Finistère, and closed before the Second World War. In 1947 it was reopened as a standard-gauge line for freight traffic only, before finally closing in 1963.

==== Carhaix – Paimpol ====
The metre gauge line between Guingamp and Paimpol was converted to dual gauge in 1924. With the removal of the metre gauge third rail in 1953, the line became standard gauge only between Guingamp and Paimpol. The conversion of the metre gauge line to standard gauge between Carhaix and Guingamp was completed on 3 July 1967.

== Wars ==
The RB was not much affected by the First World War, although some equipment was requisitioned.

During the Second World War, the line was sabotaged by the Resistance. These incidents are recorded:-

- 28 January 1944 - a train derailed at Pontrieux.
- 16 February 1944 - a locomotive and eight wagons derailed at Plouisy.
- 1 March 1944 - a locomotive and seven wagons derailed at Plouisy.
- 5 April 1944 - eight wagons derailed at Moustéru.
- During 1944, six locomotives and the bridge over the Aulne were damaged.

== Accidents ==
The RB had no major accidents. The majority of accidents being collisions with road vehicles at level crossings.

== Rolling stock ==
=== Metre gauge steam locomotives ===
Service Number	Manufacturer	Works Number	Wheel Arrangement	Class	Notes	Picture
E201	SACM, Belfort	4259/1892	2-4-0T	Type 98	Weight 21 tonnes, boiler pressure 11 atmospheres (160 psi). Withdrawn 1946.	
E202	SACM, Belfort	4260/1892	2-4-0T	Type 98	Withdrawn 1954.	
E203	SACM, Belfort	4261/1892	2-4-0T	Type 98	Withdrawn 1952 and sold by scrap merchants to a quarry at Mûr de Bretagne where it worked until the quarry closed in 1959. Scrapped in 1962.	
E204	SACM, Belfort	4462/1893	2-4-0T	Type 98	Badly damaged in collision with a German army lorry in 1942. Frames damaged beyond repair. Scrapped, but boiler reused on CFDF locomotive No 9, which took number E204 and entered service with the RB.	
E205	SACM, Belfort	4463/1893	2-4-0T	Type 98	Withdrawn 1946.	
E206	SACM, Belfort	4464/1893	2-4-0T	Type 98	Withdrawn 1954.	
E207	SACM, Belfort	4465/1893	2-4-0T	Type 98	Withdrawn 1946.	
E208	SACM, Belfort	4466/1893	2-4-0T	Type 98	Withdrawn 1954.	
E209	SACM, Belfort	4467/1893	2-4-0T	Type 98	Withdrawn 1952.	
E210	Franco Belge, Raismes	1068/1897	2-4-0T	Type 98	Withdrawn 1952.	
E211	Franco-Belge, Raismes	1069/1897	2-4-0T	Type 98	Withdrawn 1956.	
E212	Franco-Belge, Raismes	1070/1897	2-4-0T	Type 98	Withdrawn 1956.	
E213	Franco-Belge, Raismes	1071/1897	2-4-0T	Type 98	Withdrawn 1952.	
E214	Franco-Belge, Raismes	1072/1897	2-4-0T	Type 98	Withdrawn 1954.	
E215	Franco-Belge, Raismes	1073/1897	2-4-0T	Type 98	Withdrawn 1946.	
E216	Franco-Belge, Raismes	1074/1897	2-4-0T	Type 98	Withdrawn 1956.	
	Corpet-Louvet, Paris	580	0-6-0T		Ex CFDF No.9, works number 580, received boiler from E204 in 1942 and acquired that locomotive's number. Scrapped in 1946.	
E301	SACM, Belfort	4066/1892	0-6-2T	Type 71	Weight 21 tonnes, boiler pressure 11 atm (160 psi). Withdrawn 1954.	
E302	SACM, Belfort	4067/1892	0-6-2T	Type 71	Withdrawn 1954.	
E303	SACM, Belfort	4068/1892	0-6-2T	Type 71	Withdrawn 1954.	
E321	Franco-Belge, Raismes	1443/1904	4-6-0T		RB 4-6-0 tank locomotive. Weight 45 tonnes, boiler pressure 12 atm (180 psi).	
E322	Franco-Belge, Raismes	1444/1904	4-6-0T		RB 4-6-0 tank locomotive.	
E323	Franco-Belge, Raismes	1445/1904	4-6-0T		RB 4-6-0 tank locomotive.	
E324	Franco-Belge, Raismes	1446/1904	4-6-0T		RB 4-6-0 tank locomotive.	
E325	Franco-Belge, Raismes	1447/1904	4-6-0T		RB 4-6-0 tank locomotive.	
E326	Fives, Lille	3581/1909	4-6-0T		RB 4-6-0 tank locomotive.	
E327	Fives, Lille	3582/1909	4-6-0T		RB 4-6-0 tank locomotive. To Chemin de fer du Vivarais in 1967, then to Chemins de fer de Provence in 1979.	
E328	Fives, Lille	3583/1909	4-6-0T		RB 4-6-0 tank locomotive.	
E329	Fives, Lille	3584/1909	4-6-0T		RB 4-6-0 tank locomotive.	
E330	Fives, Lille	3585/1909	4-6-0T		RB 4-6-0 tank locomotive.	
E331	Fives, Lille	3586/1909	4-6-0T		RB 4-6-0 tank locomotive.	
E332	Fives, Lille	3587/1909	4-6-0T		RB 4-6-0 tank locomotive. Weight 44.5 tonnes, boiler pressure 12 atm (180 psi). Sold to the Blonay–Chamby Museum Railway, Switzerland in 1968, now preserved on the Chemin de fer de la Baie de Somme (CFBS).	
E401	SACM, Belfort	4654/1895	0-4-4-0T	Type 125	Weight 36 tonnes, boiler pressure 13 atm (190 psi). Withdrawn 1956.	
E402	SACM, Belfort	4655/1895	0-4-4-0T	Type 125	Withdrawn 1954.	
E403	SACM, Belfort	4656/1895	0-4-4-0T	Type 125	Withdrawn 1954.	
E404	SACM, Belfort	4657/1895	0-4-4-0T	Type 125	Withdrawn 1956.	
E405	SACM, Belfort	4658/1896	0-4-4-0T	Type 125	Withdrawn 1956.	
E406	SACM, Belfort	4659/1896	0-4-4-0	Type 125	Withdrawn 1956.	
E407	SACM, Belfort	4660/1896	0-4-4-0T	Type 125	Withdrawn 1954.	
E410	Piguet-Lyon, Anzin	111/1914	0-6-6-0T		Weight 54 tonnes, boiler pressure 12 atm (180 psi).	
E411	Piguet-Lyon, Anzin	112/1914	0-6-6-0T		Requisitioned by German military in 1914, to RB in April 1918.	
E412	Piguet-Lyon, Anzin	113/1914	0-6-6-0T			
E413	Piguet-Lyon, Anzin	114/1914	0-6-6-0T		Requisitioned by German military in 1914. To RB in May 1917.	
E414	Piguet-Lyon, Anzin	115/1914	0-6-6-0T			
E415	Piguet-Lyon, Anzin	116/1914	0-6-6-0T		Preserved at Carhaix. Appeal launched in 2008 to restore locomotive to working order.	
E416	Piguet-Lyon, Anzin	117/1914	0-6-6-0T			
E417	Piguet-Lyon, Anzin	118/1914	0-6-6-0T		Preserved on CF du Vivarais, carries number plate of E413.	
2504	SACM, Belfort	4265/1891	2-4-0T	Type 98	St Priest. Ex Chemins de fer du Cher. To RB in 1944, withdrawn in 1956.	
107	Corpet-Louvet, Paris	1350/1910	0-6-0T		Ex CFDF, to RB in 1945, withdrawn in 1948.	
41	Corpet-Louvet, Paris	1411/1913	0-6-6-0T		Weight 52 tonnes, boiler pressure 13 atm (190 psi). Ex Chemins de fer du Centre. To Tramways de l'Ain in 1931 but little used there. To Chemin de fer du Blanc-Argent in 1938. Overhauled by CF PO at Bordeaux in 1947 then to PO Corrèze but found to be too heavy for the line. To RB in 1953, but did not enter service until after a rebuild in 1957. Withdrawn in 1967.	

- In 1951, a 2-8-4 (number 284-03 ) built for Gelsa at the Schneider workshops in Le Creusot was tested on the RB, as was a 4-8-4 built by Batignolles-Châtillon, Nantes.

=== Metre gauge diesel locomotives ===
A British Thomson-Houston diesel locomotive was trialled on the RB, having previously been tested on the CF du Vivarais. Despite being given a more powerful engine, it was not a success.

=== Metre gauge railcars ===
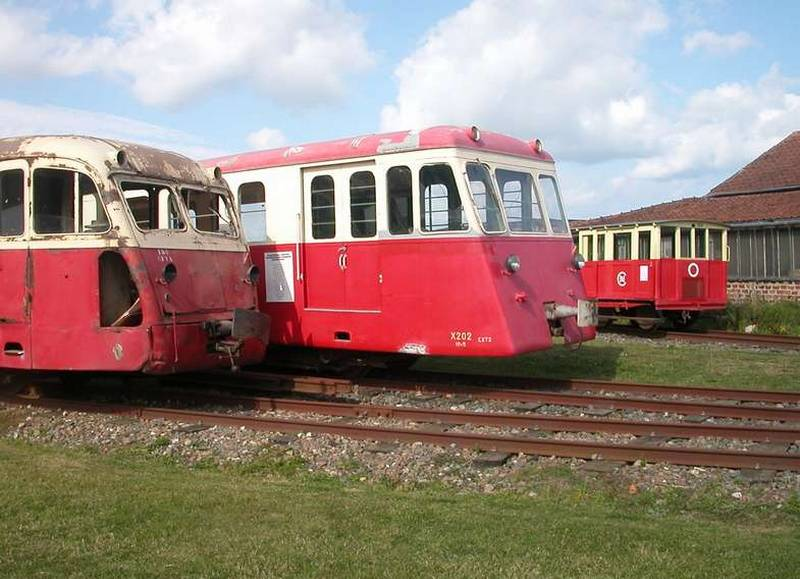
OC1 and OC2 railcars, and a Billard inspection car

- M1 De Dion-Bouton NR series, built 1936. Capacity 42 passengers. Originally fitted with a 150 horsepower (110 kW) CLM engine, later replaced by a 180 horsepower (130 kW) Willème engine. To CFBS in 1940.
- M1 De Dion-Bouton NJ series with 85 horsepower (63 kW) Unic engine. Capacity 32 passengers. Ex SE Valmondois-Marines.
- M2 De Dion-Bouton NJ series with 85 horsepower (63 kW) Unic engine. Capacity 32 passengers. Ex SE Valmondois-Marines.
- M3 De Dion-Bouton NJ series with 85 horsepower (63 kW) Unic engine. Capacity 32 passengers. Ex SE Valmondois-Marines.
- R3 Billard A-150-D series with engine removed, used as a trailer. Built 1937, capacity 34 passengers.
- R4 Billard A-150-D series with engine removed, used as a trailer. Built 1937, capacity 34 passengers.
- R5 Billard A-150-D series with engine removed, used as a trailer. Built 1947, capacity 34 passengers. Preserved by VF du Velay.
- R6 Billard A-150-D series with engine removed, used as a trailer. Built 1947, capacity 34 passengers. Preserved by CFBS.
- R7 Billard A-150-D series with engine removed, used as a trailer. Built 1947, capacity 34 passengers.
- R8 Billard A-150-D series with engine removed, used as a trailer. Built 1947, capacity 34 passengers.
- R9 Billard A-150-D series with engine removed, used as a trailer. Built 1947, capacity 34 passengers.
- X151 Billard A-150-D series. One of R3-R9 with engine replaced.
- X152 Billard A-150-D series. One of R3-R9 with engine replaced. Preserved by VF du Velay.
- X153 Billard A-150-D series. One of R3-R9 with engine replaced. Preserved by VF du Velay.
- X157 De Dion-Bouton OC1 series. Ex CdN. Capacity 50 passengers. Preserved at CFBS.
- X158 De Dion-Bouton OC1 series. Ex CdN. Capacity 50 passengers. To CFBS, then Chemins de fer de Corse, preserved by ACFCdN, Langueux.
- X201 De Dion-Bouton OC2 series with 180 horsepower (130 kW) Willème engine. Delivered 1946. Capacity 59 passengers. Transferred to CF Blanc-Argent in 1967.
- X202 De Dion-Bouton OC2 series with 180 horsepower (130 kW) Willème engine. Delivered 1946. Capacity 59 passengers. Transferred to CF Blanc-Argent in 1967. Preserved by the Association des Chemins de Fer de Côtes du Nord at Langueux.
- X203 De Dion-Bouton OC2 series with 180 horsepower (130 kW) Willème engine. Delivered 1946. Capacity 59 passengers. Transferred to CF Blanc-Argent in 1967.
- X204 De Dion-Bouton OC2 series with 180 horsepower (130 kW) Willème engine. Delivered 1946. Capacity 59 passengers. Transferred to CF Blanc-Argent in 1967.
- X205 De Dion-Bouton OC2 series with 180 horsepower (130 kW) Willème engine. Delivered 1946. Capacity 59 passengers. Transferred to CF Blanc-Argent in 1967.Preserved by the train touristique de Bas-Berry.
- X206 De Dion-Bouton OC2 series with 180 horsepower (130 kW) Willème engine. Delivered 1946. Capacity 59 passengers. Transferred to CF Blanc-Argent in 1967. Preserved by the train touristique de Bas-Berry.
- X231 Decauville LJK series with two 150 horsepower (110 kW) Saurer engines. Capacity 52 passengers. Built 1940, intended for export to French Indo-China but not delivered owing to the war, to RB in 1951.
- X232 Decauville LJK series with two 150 horsepower (110 kW) Saurer engines. Capacity 52 passengers. Built 1940, intended for export to French Indo-China but not delivered owing to the war, to RB in 1951. Preserved by Musée des Tramways à Vapeur et des Chemins de Fer Secondaires France (MTVS), Butry-sur-Oise.
- X233 Decauville LJK series with two 150 horsepower (110 kW) Saurer engines. Capacity 52 passengers. Built 1940, intended for export to French Indo-China but not delivered owing to the war, to RB in 1951. In store at Tence for future use on Voies Ferrées du Velay.

In 1948, a Renault railcar with a 600 horsepower (450 kW) engine that had been destined for French Indo-China was tested on the RB for six months before being exported to Cameroon. In 1951, two Floirat railcars were tested on the RB before being exported.

=== Metre gauge passenger stock ===
The RB had the following passenger stock:-

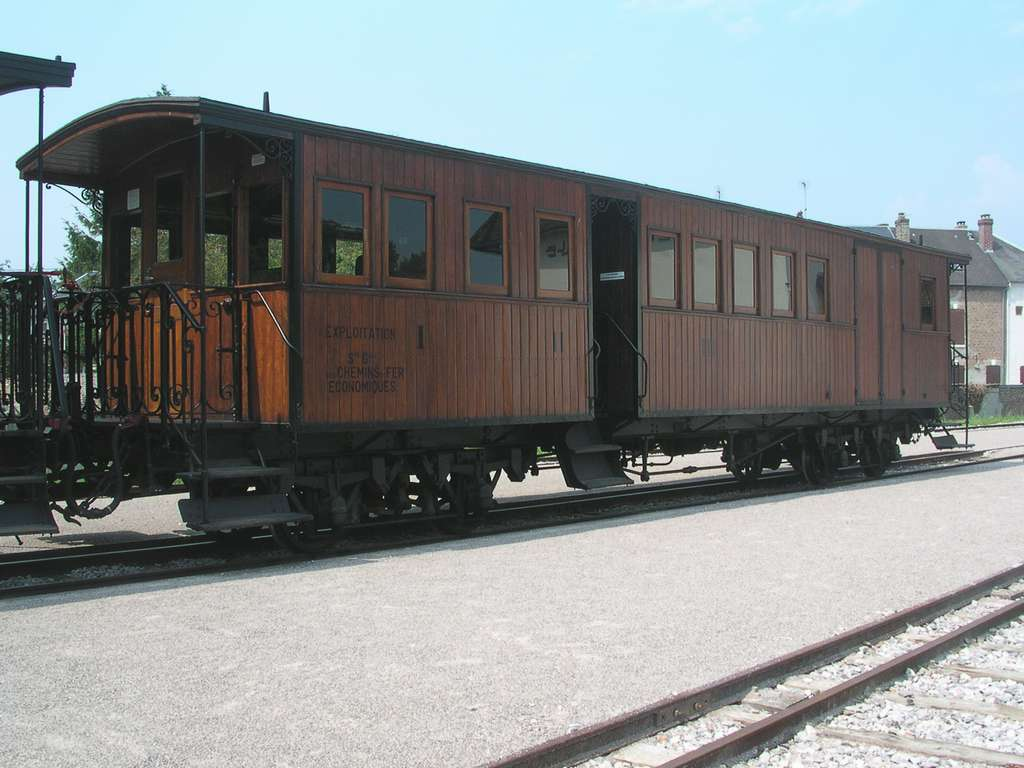
ABCDf12 as preserved on the CFBS

- Five composite carriages built by De Dietrich in 1891, numbered ABCDf1-5. Capacity 5 first, 9 second and 22 third class passengers.
- Six composite carriages built by De Dietrich in 1892, numbered ABCDf6-11. Capacity 5 first, 9 second and 22 third class passengers.
- Four composite carriages built by De Dietrich in 1893, numbered ABCDf12-15. Capacity 5 first, 9 second and 22 third class passengers.
- Four composite carriages built by De Dietrich in 1895, numbered ABDf51-54. Capacity 7 first and 19 second class passengers.
- Four composite carriages built by Carel, Fouché et Compagnie, Le Mans in 1903, numbered ABDf55-60. Capacity 7 first and 19 second class passengers.
- Five composite carriages built by Carel, Fouché et Compagnie, Le Mans in 1909, numbered ABDf61-65. Capacity 7 first and 19 second class passengers.
- Four composite carriages built by De Dietrich in 1897, numbered ABf81-84. Capacity 15 first and 21 second class passengers.
- Two composite carriages built by De Dietrich in 1899, numbered ABf85-86. Capacity 15 first and 21 second class passengers.
- One composite carriage built by Carel, Fouché et Compagnie, Le Mans in 1903, numbered ABf87. Capacity 18 first and 24 second class passengers.
- Four composite carriages built by Carel, Fouché et Compagnie, Le Mans in 1909, numbered ABDfy88-91. Capacity 14 first and 21 second class passengers.
- Five third class carriages built by De Dietrich in 1891, numbered Cf101-105. Capacity 58 passengers. Cf101 preserved by MTVS.
- Six third class carriages built by De Dietrich in 1892, numbered Cf106-111. Capacity 58 passengers.
- Four third class carriages built by De Dietrich in 1895, numbered Cf112-115. Capacity 58 passengers.
- Four third class carriages built by De Dietrich in 1899, numbered Cf116-119. Capacity 58 passengers.
- Ten third class carriages built by Carel, Fouché et Compagnie, Le Mans in 1903, numbered Cf120-129. Capacity 58 passengers.
- Ten third class carriages built by Carel, Fouché et Compagnie, Le Mansin 1905, numbered Cf130-139. Capacity 58 passengers.
- One composite carriage built by De Dietrich in 1899, numbered ABfy1000.

Preservation

Some twenty vehicles survive, including twelve on the Chemin de fer du Vivarais and four on the CF du Velay.

=== Metre gauge freight stock ===
- 35 Fourgons numbered Df201-235.
- 296 vans, numbered K301-596. K539 preserved by MTVS.
- 147 vans, numbered Kf1451-1598. Three vans preserved by MTVS, numbered KF1374, Kf1457 and Kf1467.
- 168 open wagons, numbered UL501-668.
- 85 open wagons, numbered ULf1651-1736
- 51 bolster flats, numbered QMo951-952.
- 105 Plats à bord rabattant, numbered HM701-805
- 42 Plats à bord rabattant, numbered HMf1851-1893.
- 1 tank wagon, ex Df220, numbered SC10.
- 15 Plats à bogies, numbered HMy2001-2016.

Vehicles with a "f" in their numbers were equipped with a vacuum brake. Non braked vehicles were through piped.

Preservation

Some twenty vehicles have been preserved, mostly vans. They can be found on the CF Blanc-Argent, CFBS, ACFCdN and MTVS.

=== Metre gauge departmental stock ===
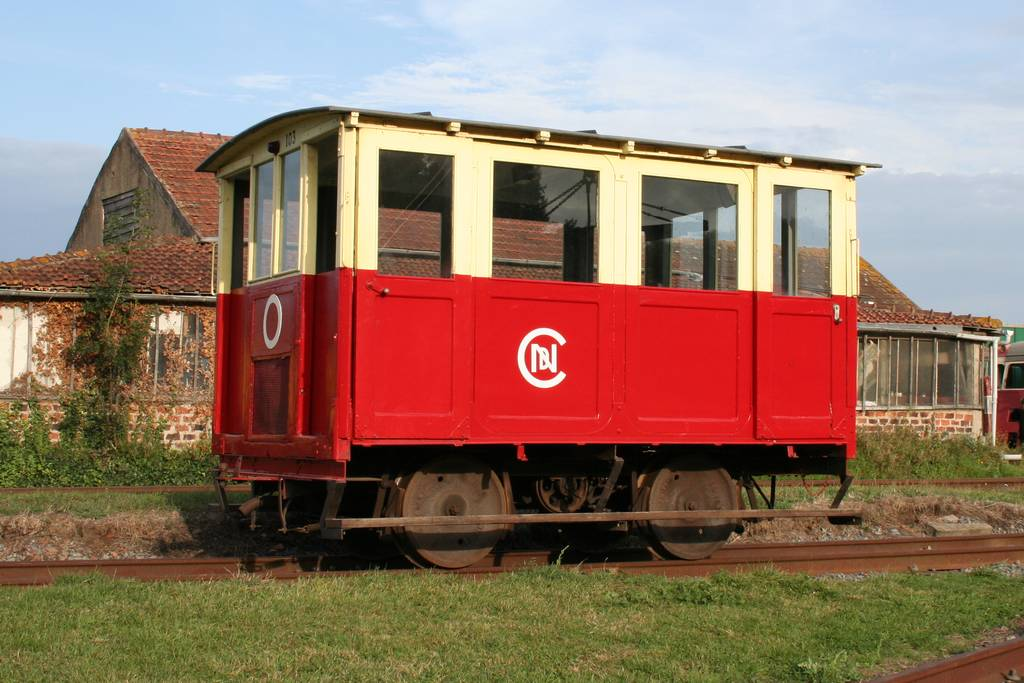
Billard inspection car

- 1 rail mounted crane, numbered S3001.
- 1 crane runner, ex HM713, numbered S3002.
- 1 crew carriage, ex ABDf8, numbered S3003.
- 1 tool van, ex Kf 1460, numbered S3004.
- 1 flat wagon, ex HMf1856, numbered S3005.
- 1 workshop van, ex K464, numbered S3006.
- 1 van for calibrating scales, ex Kf1588, numbered S3007.
- 2 weedkiller tanks, ex QMo949, numbered S3008 and ex ABCDf13, numbered S3012.
- 1 tank agon, ex K530, numbered S3009.
- 1 Dormitory carriage, ex ABf86, numbered S3011.
- 2 bogie flats, numbered HMfy2021-2022.
- 2 carriages leased out, ex ABf87, numbered S3013 and ex Cf115, numbered S3014.
- 16 inspection cars built by Billard, numbered 1-16. No. 1 was converted to standard gauge and renumbered 101.
- 1 inspection car ex Réseau d'Anjou. Acquired in 1947 and converted to standard gauge, numbered 102.
- 2 inspection cars, ex Réseau d'Anjou and CF Valmondois-Marines. Numbered 17–18.

Preservation

Six of the inspection cars have been preserved, including No.3 on the CF Blonay-Camay and No. 6 on the CF Touristique d'Ardèche.

=== Standard gauge steam locomotives ===
The first RB standard gauge locomotive was an 0-6-0 built in the 1860s for the CF de l'Ouest. Several were in use until the end of the Second World War. There were also five 0-10-0T locomotives ex Saxony Railways class XI, built by Hartman between 1913 and 1918. In 1939, some 2-6-2T locomotives were acquired. They were in service until 1953. After the war, some 2-8-0 locomotives by Baldwin and Alco were acquired. In 1956, some 4-6-0 locomotive are acquired from the CF PO, and in 1958, some 2-8-2 locomotives by Fives-Lille are leased. These are used until the end of steam in 1971.

=== Standard gauge railcars ===
- Two Renault TE series railcars acquired in 1954.
- Two Renault AEK series railcars acquired in 1959.
- XAB4051 Renault VH series railcar built in 1960, acquired in 1967.
- Two Renault U150 series railcars acquired in 1970.
- Two Renault U300 series railcars acquired in 1972.
- X233 Decauville U600 series railcar acquired in 1982.
- One ANF 2100 series railcar acquired in 1987.
- X97151 Soulé A2E railcar built 1990, with 280 horsepower (210 kW) engines, seating 50 passengers.
- X97152 Soulé A2E railcar built 1990, with 280 horsepower (210 kW) engines, seating 50 passengers.
- X97153 Soulé A2E railcar built 1990, with 280 horsepower (210 kW) engines, seating 50 passengers.

=== Standard gauge diesel locomotives ===
- BB4817
- Moyse diesel locomotive.

=== Standard gauge departmental stock ===
- 101 Billard inspection car.
- 102 Billard inspection car.

== Bibliography ==
- an Hir, Reun (1990). By Road, Rails and Waves-Brittany's Transport system through the Centuries. Lesneven: Mouladurioù Hor Yezh. ISBN.
- par Bernard Rozé, Pierre Laederich et André Jacquot; Bernard Rozé; Pierre Laederich; André Jacquot (1990). Le Réseau Breton (in French). Valignat: l'Ormet. ISBN 2-906575-05-4.
- Domengie, Henri (1990). Les petits trains de jadis-Ouest de la France (in French). Breil-sur-Roya: Cabri. ISBN 2-903310-87-4.
- Dahlström, Marc (1989). La France à voie étroite (in French). Self published. ISBN 2-9502499-2-2.
- de Sinety, Madeleine (1997). Guingamp-Paimpol, Deux Minutes d'arrêt (in French). Rue des Scribes. ISBN 2-906064-45-9.
- Huitorel, Jean-Charles. Cheminots, Gestes & Paroles (in French). Le Télégramme. ISBN 2-84833-035-X.
- de Dieuleveult, Alain (1998). Finistère en Petits Trains (in French). Cénomane. ISBN 2-905596-60-0.
