= Réseau Breton 4-6-0 tank locomotives =

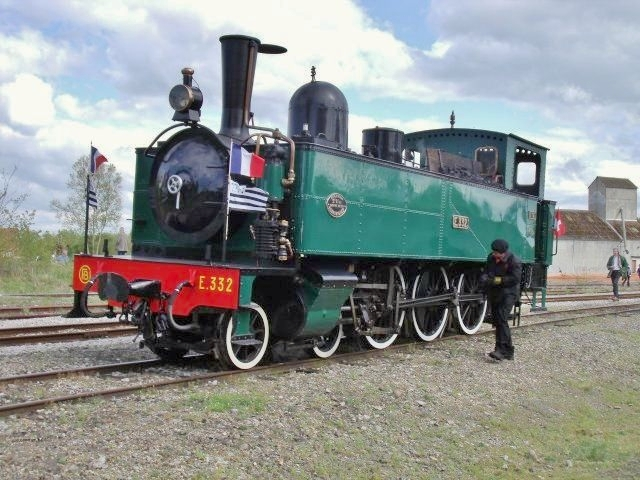
- E 332 as preserved.
Type and origin
- Power type: Steam
- Builder: Société Franco-Belge de Matériel de Chemins de Fer (Franco-Belge); Compagnie de Fives-Lille pour constructions mécaniques et entreprises
- Build date: 1904 (Franco-Belge); 1909 (Fives-Lille)
- Total produced: 12
Specifications
- Configuration
  - Whyte: 4-6-0T
  - UIC: 2′C n2t
- Gauge: 1,000 mm (3 ft 3 3/8 in)
- Leading dia.: 730 mm (2 ft 5 in)
- Driver dia.: 1,230 mm (4 ft 0 in)
- Length: 9.45 m (31 ft 0 in)
- Width: 2.69 m (8 ft 10 in)
- Height: 3.60 m (11 ft 10 in)
- Axle load: 10.5 t (10.3 long tons)
- Loco weight: 33.5 t (33.0 long tons) (empty); 44.5 t (43.8 long tons) (working order)
- Fuel type: Coal
- Boiler pressure: 12 bar (170 psi)
- Heating surface
  - Firebox: 1 m^{2} (11 sq ft)
  - Tubes: 79 m^{2} (850 sq ft)
- Cylinders: 2
- Cylinder size: 400 mm × 460 mm (16 in × 18 in)
Performance figures
- Maximum speed: 55 km/h (34 mph)
Career
- Operators: Réseau Breton
- Number in class: 12
- Numbers: E 321–E 332
- Last run: 1967
- Withdrawn: 1967
- Preserved: 2
- Current owner: Fédération de Amis des Chemins de Fer Secondaires (1); Chemin de Fer de la Baie de Somme (1)

The Réseau Breton 4-6-0 tank locomotives were a class of metre gauge locomotives. The twelve class members were built in two batches by Franco-Belge and Fives-Lille for the Réseau Breton (RB) in France. Introduced in 1904, they were to be found all over the Réseau Breton system, lasting in traffic until the closure of the metre gauge lines in 1967.

== Background ==
The Réseau Breton originally employed a number of 2-6-0T locomotives and also a number of 0-6-6-0T Mallet locomotives. The 4-6-0T locomotives were intended to combine the lightness of the 2-6-0Ts with the power of the Mallets. The locomotives were built to operate on the Loudéac to La Brohinière and Carhaix to Châteaulin lines.

== Locomotives ==
=== Franco-Belge locomotives ===
Société Franco-Belge of Raismes built the initial batch of five locomotives. They were numbered E 321–E 325 on the Réseau Breton. The locomotives carried works numbers 1443–1447 respectively.

=== Fives-Lille locomotives ===
As the initial design was a success, a further seven locomotives were built by Compagnie de Fives-Lille pour constructions mécaniques et entreprises at Fives (Lille). These locomotives were numbered E 326–E 332 on the Réseau Breton. They carried works numbers 3581–3587 respectively.

== History ==
The locomotives were utilised across the whole of the Réseau Breton system. They were capable of hauling trains of 230 tonnes (226 long tons) at 55 kilometres per hour (34 mph) on the flat. Some of the locomotives lasted in service on the Réseau Breton until the closure of the metre gauge lines in 1967.

== Specifications ==
The locomotives were 9.45 metres (31 ft 0 in) long, with a width of 2.69 m (8 ft 10 in) and a height of 3.60 m (11 ft 10 in). They were non-superheated locomotives, with two cylinders of 400 mm (16 in) diameter by 460 mm (18 in) stroke. The firebox grate had an area of 1 square metre (11 sq ft), with a total heating area of 79 m^{2} (850 sq ft) Weight was 33.5 t (33.0 long tons) empty, 44.5 t (43.8 long tons) in working order.

== Preservation ==
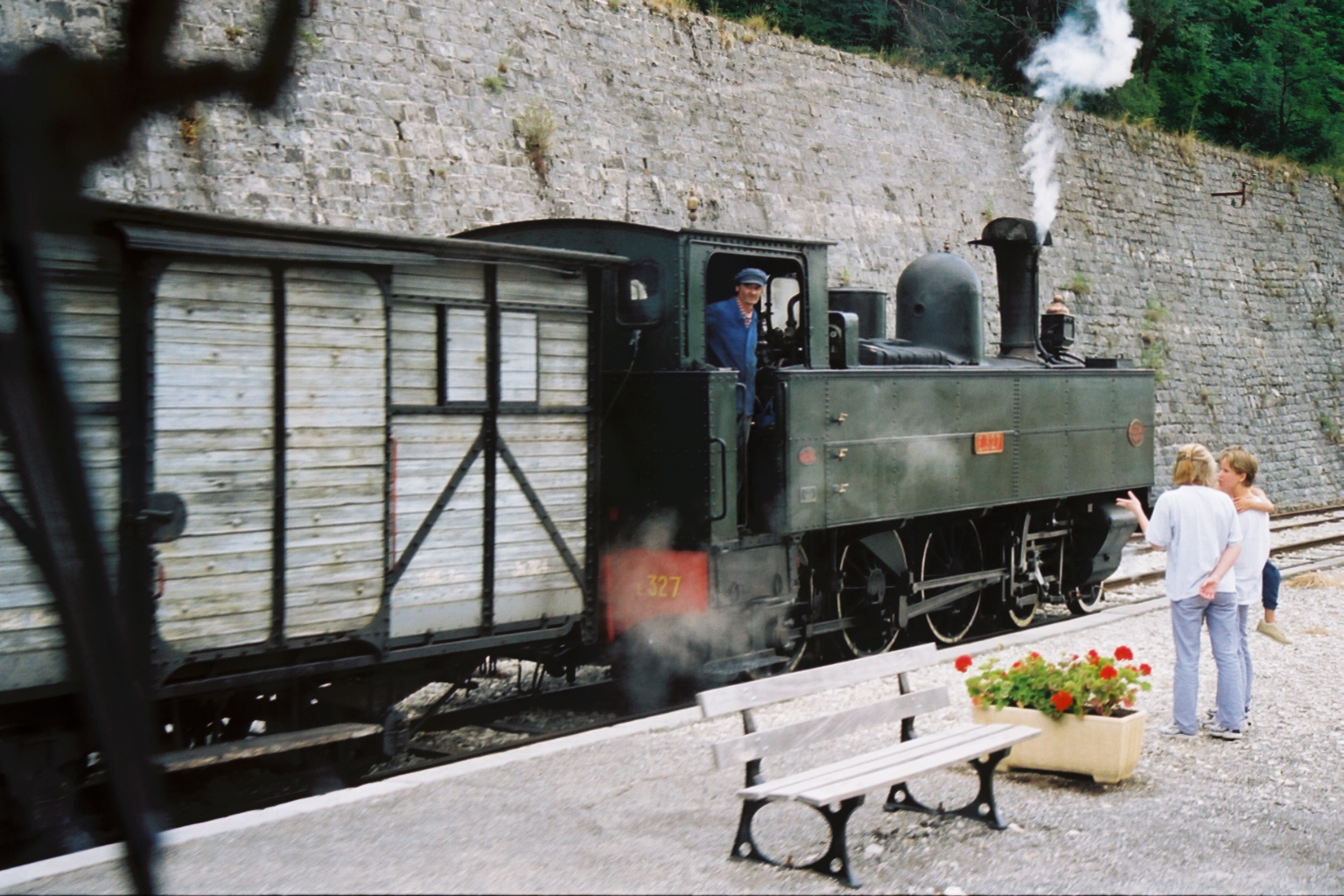
E 327 on the Chemins de Fer de Provence, August 2006

Two locomotives have been preserved.

=== E 327 ===
E 327 was saved by Fédération de Amis des Chemins de Fer Secondaires (FACS). It was originally preserved on the Chemin de fer du Vivarais (CFV), but was too heavy for that line, which had an axle limit of 8 tonnes (7.9 long tons). In 1979, the locomotive was transferred to the Chemins de Fer de Provence (CP), where it is based at Annot.

=== E 332 ===
E 332 was initially preserved on the Blonay–Chamby Museum Railway (BC) in Switzerland, where it spent a period on static display. In 2009, it was moved to the Chemin de Fer de la Baie de Somme (CFBS) and has since been restored to working order.
