= Paimpol station =

Railway station in Paimpol, France

Coordinates: 48°46′37″N 3°02′46″W

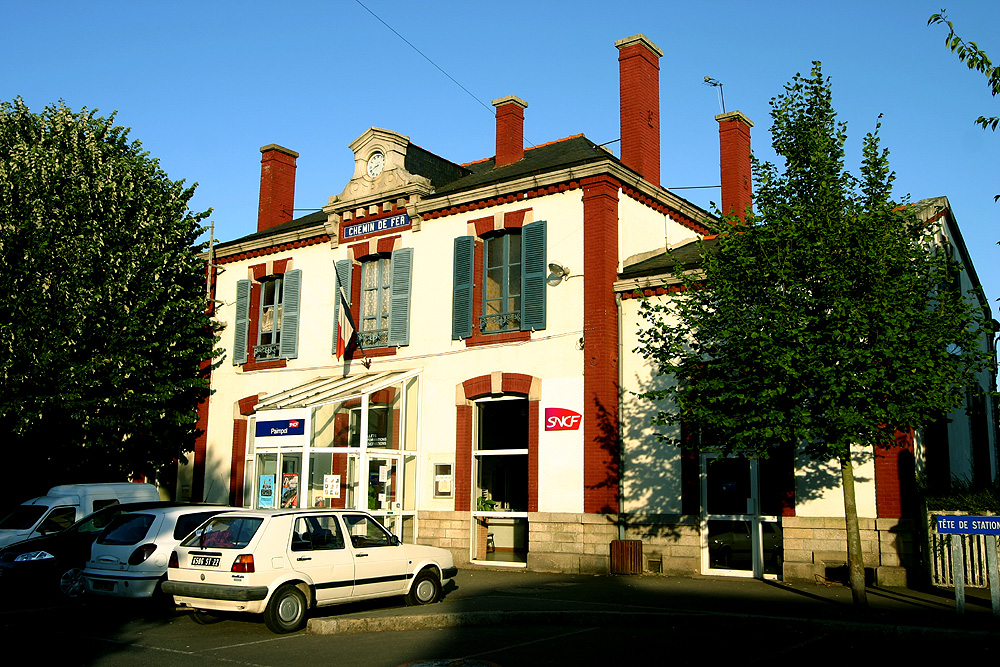
Gare de Paimpol from the car park

Gare de Paimpol is a railway station serving the town Paimpol, Côtes-d'Armor department, western France. It's the terminus of the line from Guingamp. The station is served by regional trains to Guingamp.

== See also ==
- Réseau Breton

Preceding station	TER Bretagne	Following station
Lancerf towards Guingamp	25b	Terminus
