= Carhaix station =

Railway station in Finistère, France

Coordinates: 48°16′40″N 3°33′44″W

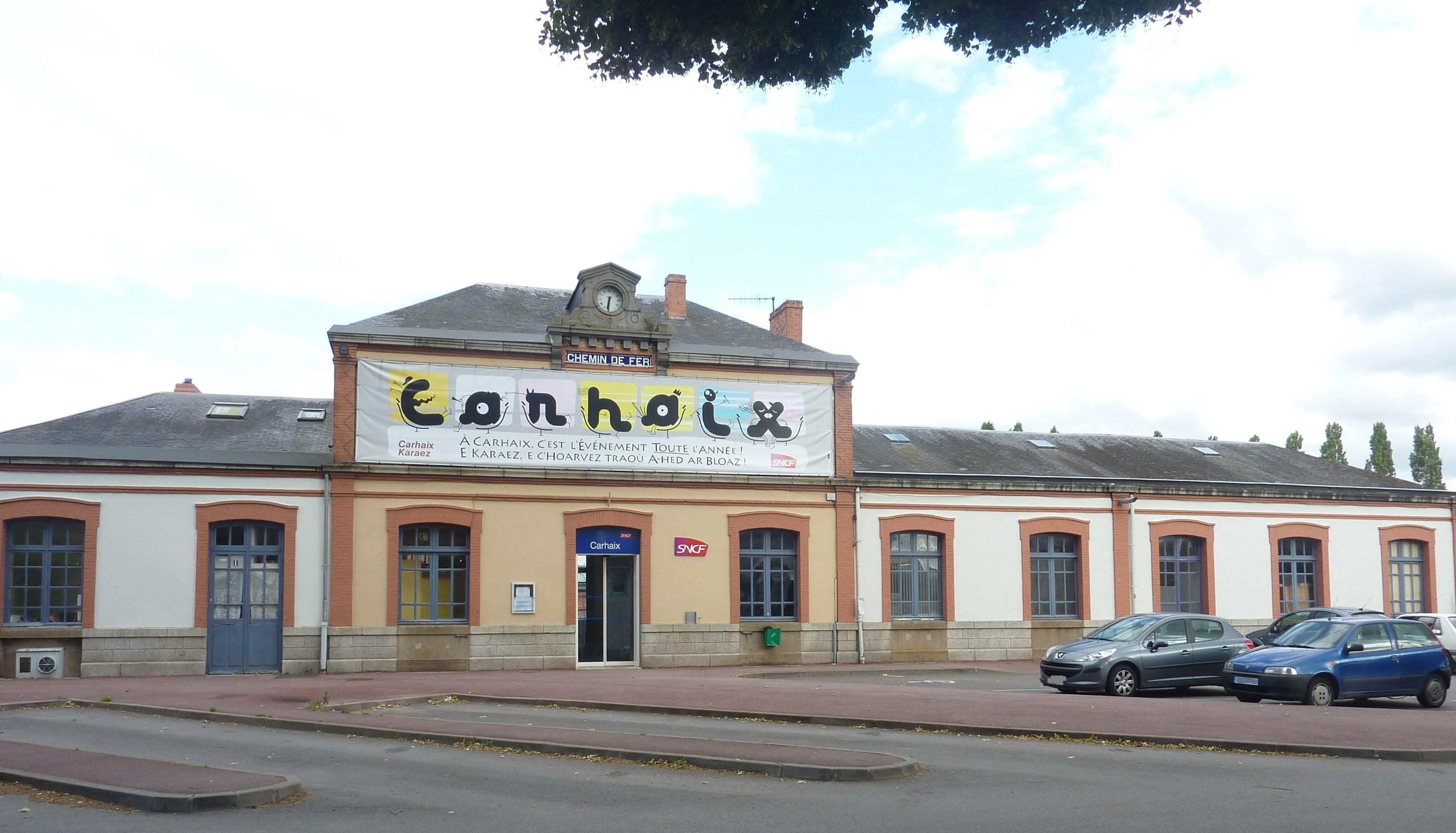
Carhaix station in 2011

Gare de Carhaix is a railway station serving the town Carhaix-Plouguer, Finistère department, western France. The station is served by regional trains to Guingamp. The station was the hub of the Réseau Breton.

Preceding station	TER Bretagne	Following station
Terminus	25	Carnoët-Locarn towards Guingamp
