= Guingamp station =

Railway station in Guingamp, France

Guingamp Gwengamp
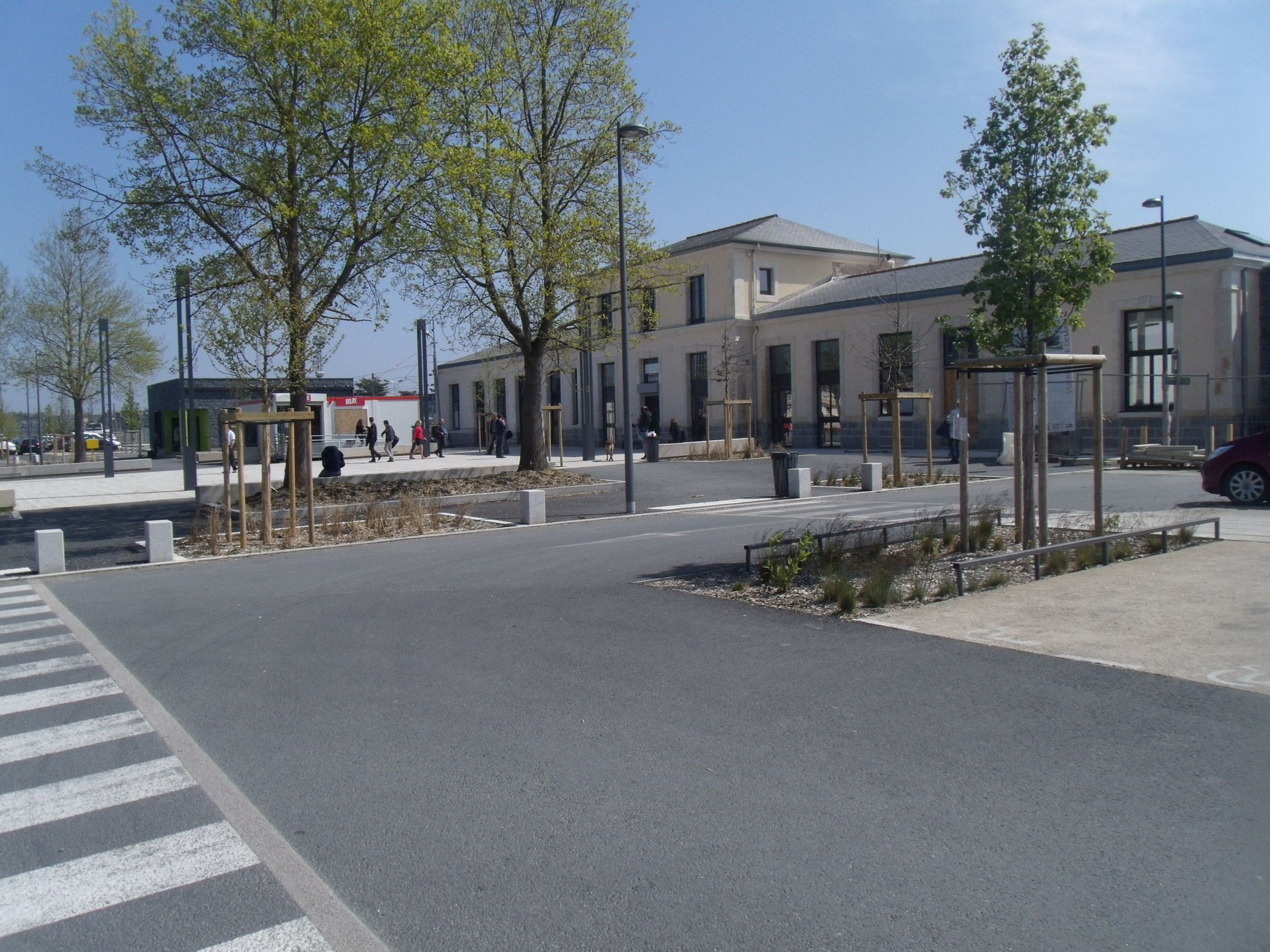
- Guingamp railway station in 2015

General information
- Location: Place de la Gare; 22200 Guingamp; Côtes-d'Armor; France
- Coordinates: 48°33′20″N 3°08′36″W
- Lines: Paris–Brest railway Guingamp-Paimpol railway Guingamp-Carhaix railway
- Platforms: 2
- Tracks: 3

Other information
- Station code: 87473207

History
- Opened: 7 September 1863

Passengers
- 2024: 1,070,109
Location

Guingamp station (French: Gare de Guingamp; Breton: Ti-gar Gwengamp) is a railway station serving the town of Guingamp, Côtes-d'Armor department, western France. It is on the Paris–Brest railway, and is also an important station for the local railway network TER Bretagne.

== Services ==
The station is served by high speed trains to Brest, Rennes and Paris, and regional trains to Brest, Lannion, Carhaix, Paimpol and Rennes.

Preceding station	SNCF	Following station
Plouaret-Trégor towards Lannion	TGV	Saint-Brieuc towards Montparnasse
Plouaret-Trégor towards Brest	TGV	Saint-Brieuc towards Montparnasse
Preceding station	TER Bretagne	Following station
Plouaret-Trégor towards Brest	1	Saint-Brieuc towards Rennes
Belle-Isle-Bégard towards Lannion	21	Châtelaudren-Plouagat towards Saint-Brieuc
Moustéru towards Carhaix	25	Terminus
Terminus	25b	Gourland towards Paimpol
