= Carhaix-Plouguer =

Carhaix-Plouguer Karaez-Plougêr (Breton)
- Commune
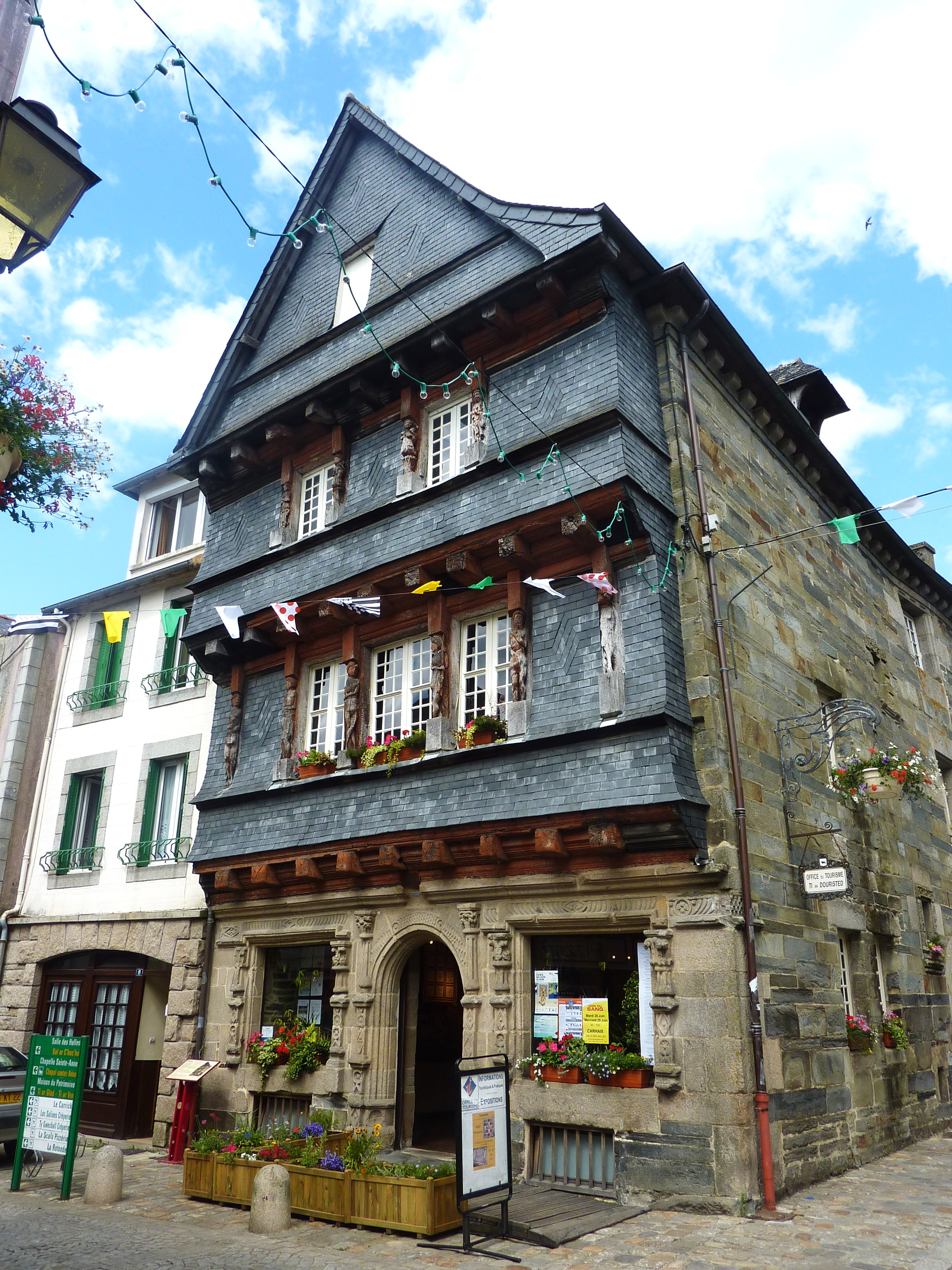
- The 16th century house of the Seneschal, previously the tourist information office, now located at Vorgium

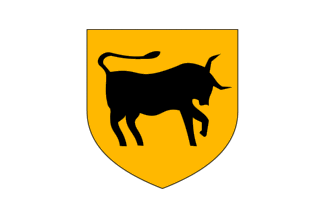
- Flag Coat of arms
- Location of Carhaix-Plouguer
- Location within France Location within Brittany
- Coordinates: 48°16′42″N 3°34′02″W
- Country: France
- Region: Brittany
- Department: Finistère
- Arrondissement: Châteaulin
- Canton: Carhaix-Plouguer
- Intercommunality: Poher

Government
  - Mayor (2020–2026): Christian Troadec (DVG)
- Area^{1}: 25.81 km^{2} (9.97 sq mi)
- Highest elevation: 169 m (554 ft)
- Lowest elevation: 69 m (226 ft)
- Population (2023): 7,412
  - Density: 287.2/km^{2} (743.8/sq mi)
- Time zone: UTC+01:00 (CET)
  - Summer (DST): UTC+02:00 (CEST)
- INSEE/Postal code: 29024 /29270
- ^{1} French Land Register data, which excludes lakes, ponds, glaciers > 1 km^{2} (0.386 sq mi or 247 acres) and river estuaries.

Carhaix-Plouguer (French: [kaʁɛ pluɡɛʁ, kaʁe -]; Breton: Karaez-Plougêr [kaˈrɛːs ˈpluːɡɛːr]), commonly known as just Carhaix (Karaez), is a commune in the French department of Finistère, region of Brittany, France. The commune was created in 1957 by the merger of the former communes Carhaix and Plouguer.

== Geography ==
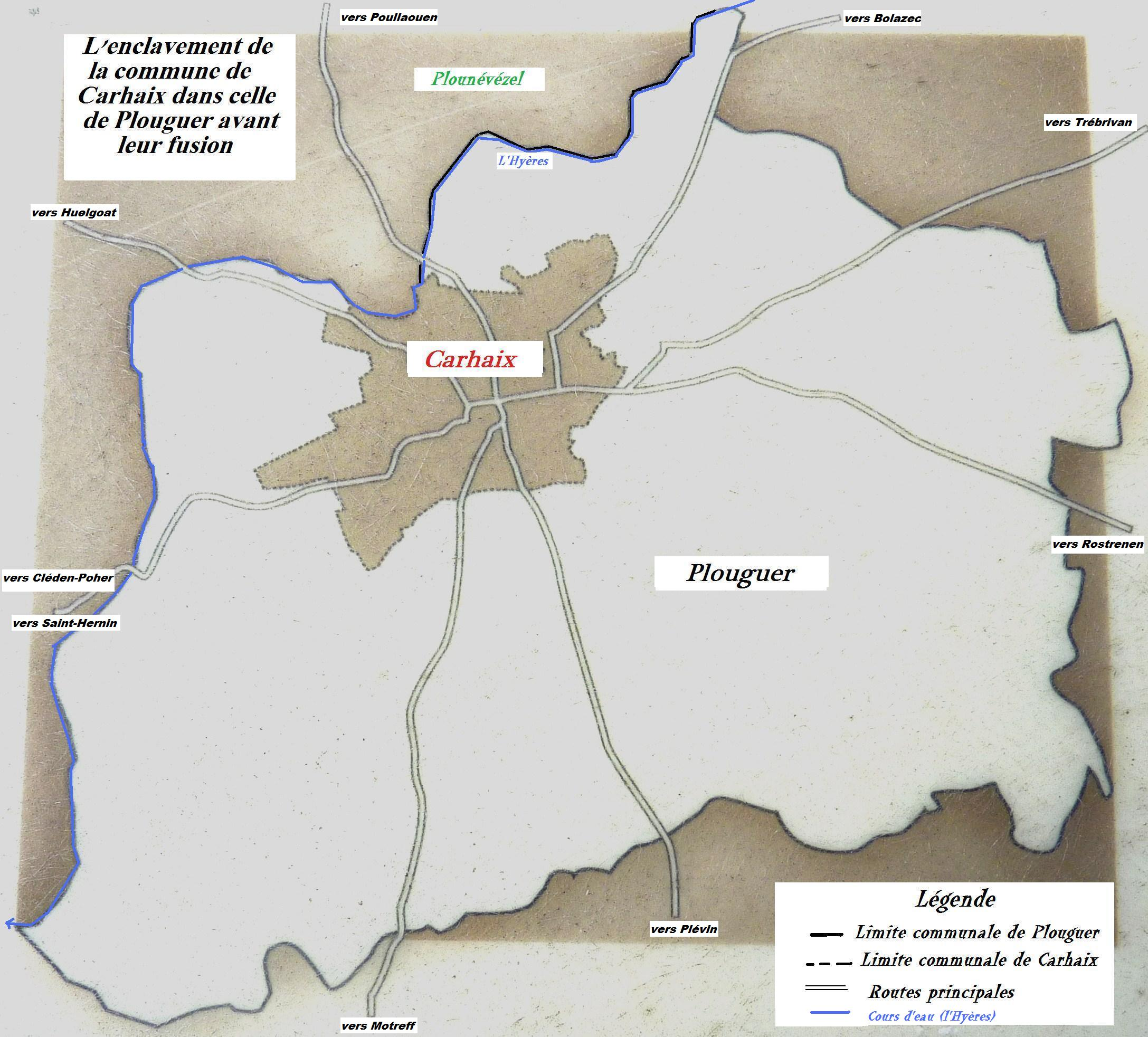
Map of Carhaix and Plouguer before their merger.

Carhaix is located in the Poher, an important territory of Brittany, sandwiched between the Arrée Mountains to the north and the Black Mountains to the south. The agglomeration developed mainly on a plateau located at 140 meters above sea level, gently sloping towards the west, the highest elevations being eastwards beyond the agglomeration towards 155–169 meters above sea level. This plateau is limited to the north by the valley of the Hyères (60 meters elevation that imposed the construction of an aqueduct in Roman times to cross it), which flows to 80 meters above sea level, and south by the stream of the Madeleine whose route was taken again by the channel of Nantes in Brest. The Hyères sometimes causes serious floods: in March 1903, the Sainte-Catherine chapel located in Plounevézel but at the limit of Carhaix, had water up to the roof and in 1910 to the stained glass windows.

Geologically, Carhaix is located in the center of the Châteaulin basin, which consists mainly of slate and sandstone schists and forms a topographic depression between the Arrée Mountains and the Black Mountains.

Having become communes at the French Revolution, Carhaix and Plouguer merged in 1957 and took the name of Carhaix-Plouguer. As early as 1862, the municipal council of Carhaix had expressed a wish in this direction. Carhaix station has rail connections to Guingamp.

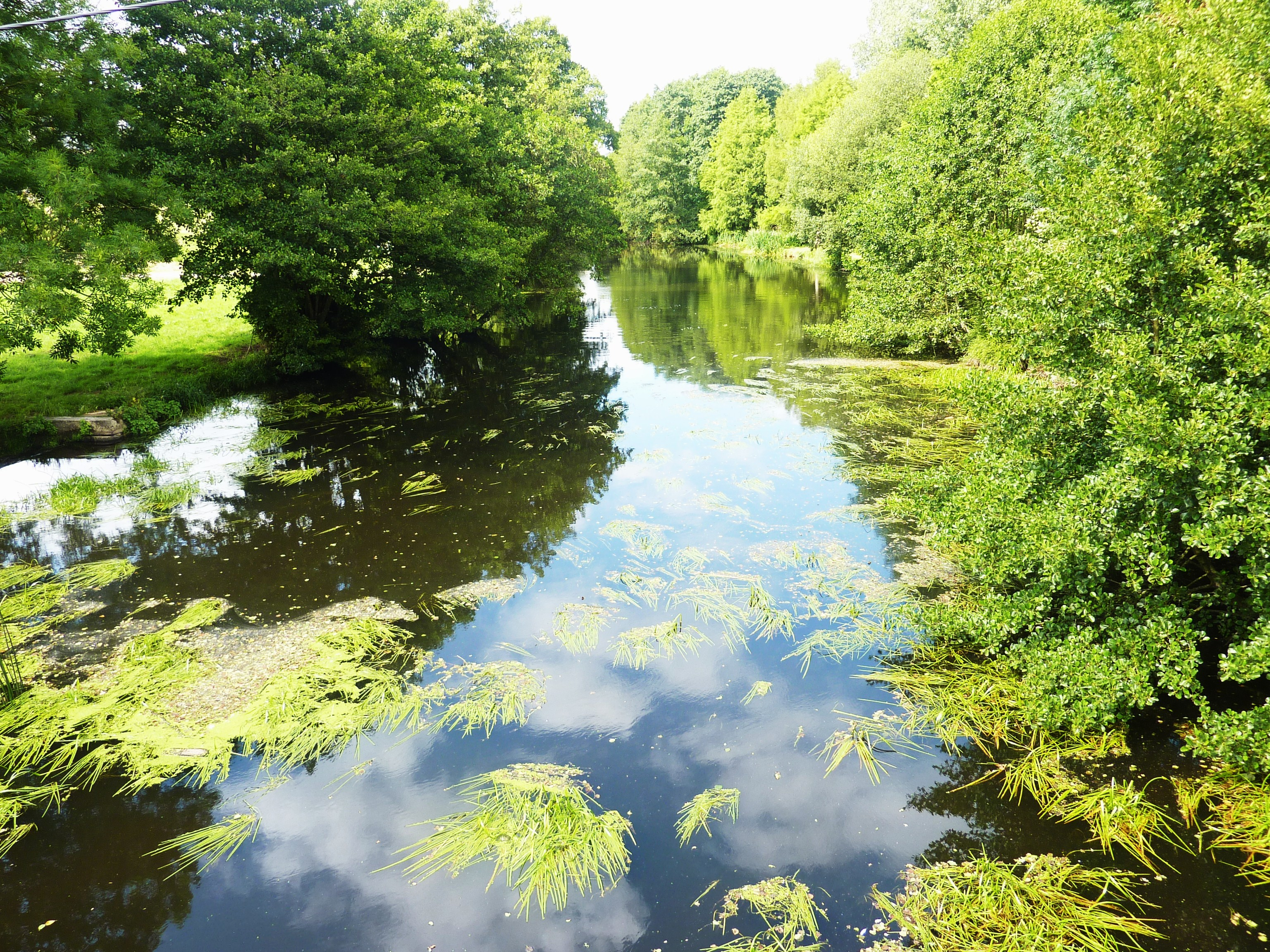
The Hyères from Petit Carhaix bridge (upstream view).

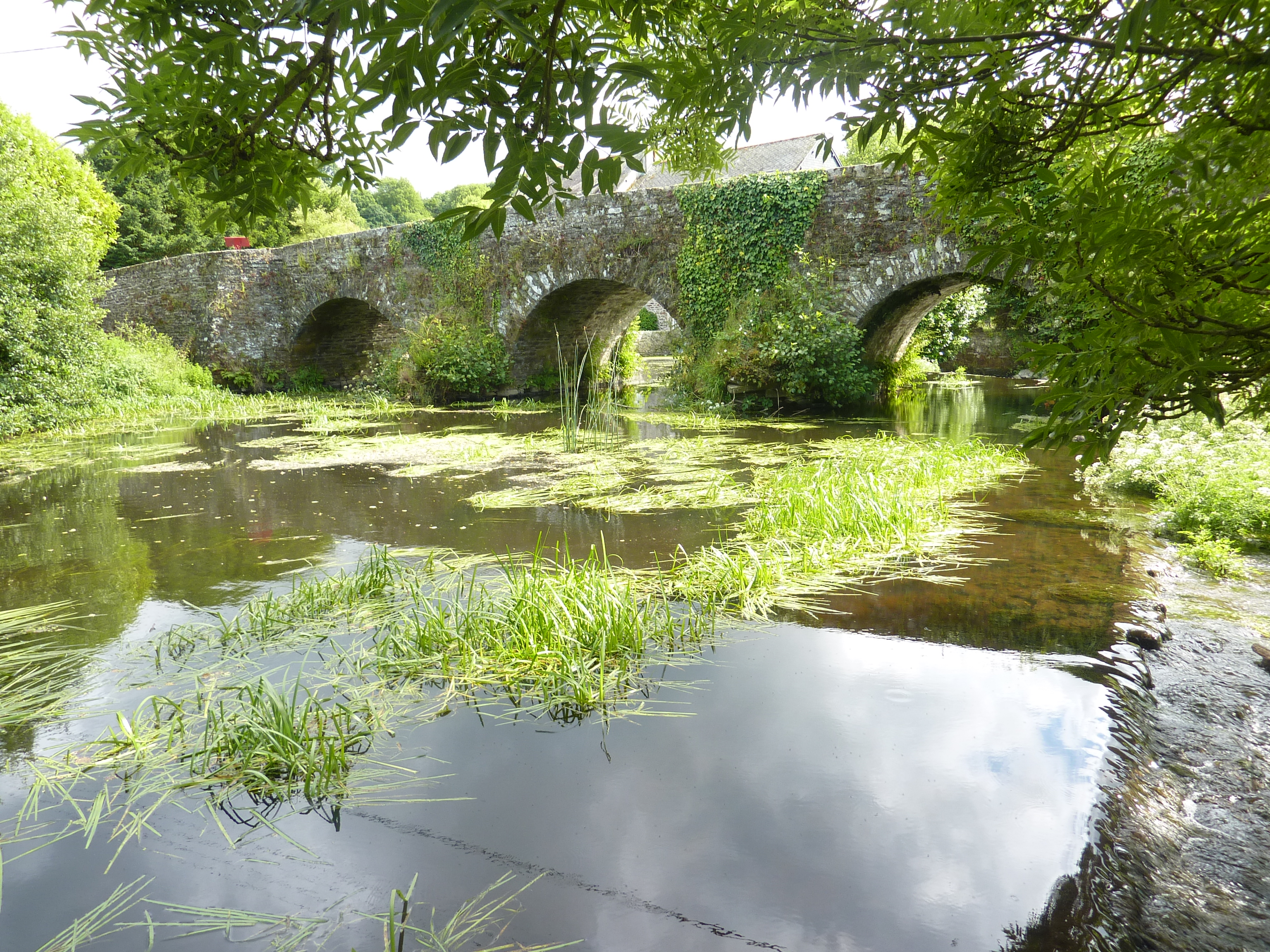
Le Petit Carhaix: the 18th century bridge on the Hyères (seen from upstream).

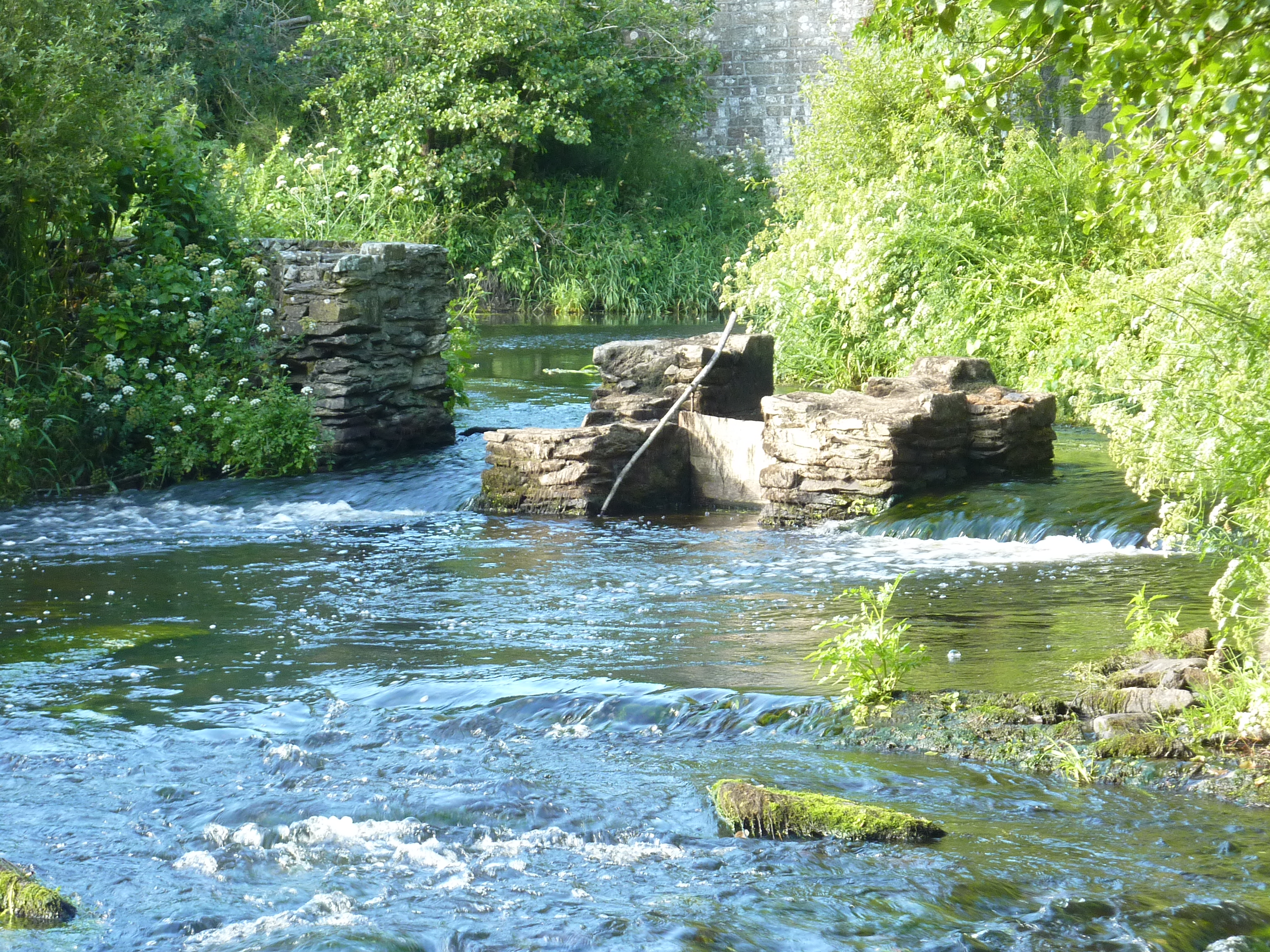
The Meur mill on the Hyères, old dyke and sluice.

=== Climate ===
Carhaix-Plouguer has an oceanic climate (Köppen climate classification Cfb). The average annual temperature in Carhaix-Plouguer is 11.1 °C (52.0 °F). The average annual rainfall is 1,082.4 mm (42.61 in) with December as the wettest month. The temperatures are highest on average in August, at around 17.1 °C (62.8 °F), and lowest in January, at around 5.7 °C (42.3 °F). The highest temperature ever recorded in Carhaix-Plouguer was 39.0 °C (102.2 °F) on 9 August 2003; the coldest temperature ever recorded was −13.0 °C (8.6 °F) on 14 January 1985.

Climate data for Carhaix-Plouguer (1991–2020 normals, extremes 1983–2020)
Month	Jan	Feb	Mar	Apr	May	Jun	Jul	Aug	Sep	Oct	Nov	Dec	Year
Record high °C (°F)	14.5 (58.1)	23.0 (73.4)	23.5 (74.3)	29.0 (84.2)	30.5 (86.9)	34.0 (93.2)	35.5 (95.9)	39.0 (102.2)	31.5 (88.7)	28.5 (83.3)	21.0 (69.8)	17.0 (62.6)	39.0 (102.2)
Mean daily maximum °C (°F)	9.1 (48.4)	10.0 (50.0)	12.5 (54.5)	15.1 (59.2)	18.2 (64.8)	21.1 (70.0)	22.9 (73.2)	22.9 (73.2)	20.6 (69.1)	16.4 (61.5)	12.3 (54.1)	9.6 (49.3)	15.9 (60.6)
Daily mean °C (°F)	6.1 (43.0)	6.4 (43.5)	8.1 (46.6)	9.9 (49.8)	12.9 (55.2)	15.6 (60.1)	17.4 (63.3)	17.4 (63.3)	15.2 (59.4)	12.2 (54.0)	8.8 (47.8)	6.6 (43.9)	11.4 (52.5)
Mean daily minimum °C (°F)	3.2 (37.8)	2.8 (37.0)	3.8 (38.8)	4.8 (40.6)	7.5 (45.5)	10.1 (50.2)	11.9 (53.4)	11.9 (53.4)	9.8 (49.6)	8.1 (46.6)	5.4 (41.7)	3.6 (38.5)	6.9 (44.4)
Record low °C (°F)	−13.0 (8.6)	−10.0 (14.0)	−6.5 (20.3)	−4.5 (23.9)	−2.0 (28.4)	0.8 (33.4)	4.0 (39.2)	2.5 (36.5)	1.0 (33.8)	−4.5 (23.9)	−8.0 (17.6)	−10.0 (14.0)	−13.0 (8.6)
Average precipitation mm (inches)	132.3 (5.21)	110.2 (4.34)	78.6 (3.09)	80.5 (3.17)	74.8 (2.94)	56.4 (2.22)	58.5 (2.30)	62.3 (2.45)	74.1 (2.92)	112.1 (4.41)	127.4 (5.02)	145.2 (5.72)	1,112.4 (43.80)
Average precipitation days (≥ 1.0 mm)	16.6	14.1	13.1	12.0	11.0	9.0	9.5	9.8	10.1	14.6	17.2	17.5	154.4
Source: Meteociel

== Name ==
The name in Breton of the commune is Karaez-Plougêr.

In a charter signed by the Count of Cornouaille, Hoel, to "donate a villa near Caer Ahes, in which is the church of sanctus Kigavus (saint Quijeau), we find the oldest form of name of Carhaix, close and contemporary to those mentioned in medieval novels. The charter is necessarily prior to the death of Hoel (1084). Saint-Quijeau is an ancient trève attached to that of Plouguer in the thirteenth century.

The Breton name is Karaez (spelled Carahes in the eleventh century in a charter of Count Hoel, based on the prefix "Kaer" which means "fortified place"). Carhaix is certainly the city behind the Carahes of medieval texts.

At the time of the Tour d'Auvergne and the nineteenth century, it was believed in Kaer Ahès, the name, Ahès, of the legendary daughter of Gradlon that would have led Ys in his loss.

The main roads leading to Carhaix were therefore often called "paths of Ohès" or "roads d'Ahès" (Bernard Tanguy). Ohès as Ahès are close to the name Hoël. The identification of the place Corophesium, mentioned only in the Annals of Lausanne, is debated (Carhaix or Coray?) For a place of war led by Louis the Pious against the Breton king Morman. It may be that Corophesium represents neither one nor the other, but corresponds, as Léon Fleuriot indicates in his book The Origins of Brittany (1987), to an error of the scribe.

Bernard Tanguy brings Karaes closer to Carofes, attested in Low-Latin for the name of the city of Diablintes and for Charroux (Vienne). It would then be an old * Carofum / * Carofensis (evolution of quadruvium in carruvium), registering Carhaix in its function of road junction. For him, the Corophesium where Louis the Pious surrenders in 818 is a cacography of Carophesium. Moreover, could the association of Charlemagne with Carhaix in the novel of Aiquin be based on the expedition of his son, Louis the Pious, about which is named Corophesium?

The permanence of the Carhaix crossroads function, together with its decline in the Lower Empire, may explain that, although the city was the capital of Osism, they did not leave their name as it was the case. more often in Gaul.

== History ==
The city was called Vorgium at the time of the Roman Empire. It was the chief town of the Osismii.

== Culture ==
The Vieilles Charrues Festival (Literally: Old Ploughs Festival) is held every year in mid-July. This festival is one of the largest music events in Europe, attracting more than 200,000 people every year. It is held in the fields once held by the famille de Saisy de Kerampuil and the festival venue is next to the Chateau Kerampuil.

In 2023, the Festival du Cross, an annual international cross country running competition, was founded inspired by the Vieilles Charrues Festival.

In continental histories Carhaix is thought to be Carohaise of King Leodegrance and the Roman city of Vorgium. It is at Carohaise that the legendary King Arthur defends Leodegrance by defeating Rience, and meets Guinevere, Leodegrance's daughter. Modern archaeological digs have uncovered evidence of the ancient Roman city including its aqueduct system.

== Population ==
Inhabitants of Carhaix-Plouguer are called Carhaisiens. The population data given in the table and graph below for 1954 and earlier refer to the former commune of Carhaix.

Historical population

Year	Pop.	±% p.a.
1793	1,627	—
1800	1,734	+0.91%
1806	1,522	−2.15%
1821	1,597	+0.32%
1831	1,939	+1.96%
1836	1,984	+0.46%
1841	2,021	+0.37%
1846	2,201	+1.72%
1851	2,143	−0.53%
1856	2,229	+0.79%
1861	2,197	−0.29%
1866	2,365	+1.48%
1872	2,496	+0.90%
1876	2,518	+0.22%
1881	2,880	+2.72%
1886	2,789	−0.64%
1891	3,064	+1.90%
1896	3,032	−0.21%
1901	3,308	+1.76%

Year	Pop.	±% p.a.
1906	3,600	+1.71%
1911	3,493	−0.60%
1921	3,943	+1.22%
1926	4,115	+0.86%
1931	4,237	+0.59%
1936	4,295	+0.27%
1946	4,273	−0.05%
1954	4,032	−0.72%
1962	6,065	+5.24%
1968	7,049	+2.54%
1975	8,210	+2.20%
1982	8,591	+0.65%
1990	8,198	−0.58%
1999	7,648	−0.77%
2007	7,667	+0.03%
2012	7,423	−0.64%
2017	7,174	−0.68%
2023	7,412	+0.55%

Source: EHESS and INSEE (1968–2023)

== Festivals ==
- The Vieilles Charrues (Old Ploughs) Festival (in July since 1992 in Landeleau and since 1995 in Carhaix)
- The Book Festival in Brittany (organized by the Breton cultural center Egin, takes place on the last weekend of October since 1989)
- The prize for the City of Carhaix novel, created in 1999 at the initiative of the city of Carhaix, is awarded during the Book Festival. Laureates: Yvon Inizan (1999), Bernard Garel (2000), Jacques Josse (2001), Soazig Aaron (2002), Marie Le Drian (2003), Cédric Morgan (2004), Arnaud Le Gouëfflec (2005), Marie-Hélène Bahain (2006), Sylvain Coher (2007), Francoise Moreau (2008), Tanguy Viel (2009), Herve Jaouen (2010), Gael Brunet (2011), Claire Fourier (2012)
- In 1948, Polig Montjarret was at the origin of the creation of the second bagad recruited among the railway staff, said bagad of the railway workers of Carhaix, the second after that of Saint-Marc, in Brest.
- Review Kreiz Breizh, published by the association The Memoirs of Kreiz Breizh. 1st release in 2000.
- Review Spered Gouez / The Wild Spirit, founded in 1991 by Marie-Josée Christien, published by the Brittany Cultural Center Egin on the occasion of the Book Festival in Brittany.
- "Regard d'Espérance" magazine, journal of information and reflection, free monthly published since December 1985 by the Missionary Center of Carhaix, published 8,500 copies including interview, chronic history, economic, society, doctor's advice .. .Director of publication: Y. Charles.

== Education ==
There are about 2680 students in Carhaix, of which 234 attended a Diwan school as of school year 2003–04. Carhaix has one Diwan preschool, one primary school and a Diwan lycée (which is also the only lycée of Diwan). The lycée was from 1994 to 1999 first located in Brest. In 1999 it moved to Carhaix.

== Breton language ==
The municipality launched a linguistic plan through Ya d'ar brezhoneg on 9 April 2004.

In 2008, 21.49% of primary-school children attended bilingual schools.

== International relations ==
The following places are twinned with Carhaix-Plouguer:

- (Republic of Ireland) Carrickmacross, County Monaghan, Ulster, Ireland
- Dawlish, Devon, England, United Kingdom
- Oiartzun, Gipuzkoa, Basque Country, Spain

== Sport ==
Carhaix was a start of the 5th stage of the 2011 Tour de France.

Every year about 1,000 athletes participate in Huelgoat-Carhaix half-marathon and 10k.

== Notable people ==
- Arnaud Le Gall, politician

== See also ==
- Communes of the Finistère department
- Gare de Carhaix
- Listing of the works of the atelier of the Maître de Tronoën
