= List of railway lines in France =

Railway map of France in 2025. Other versions of this map in medium et large formats.

This is a list of railway lines in France, belonging either to the national network (SNCF Réseau) or to private owners.

== High speed lines (LGV, managed by the SNCF) ==
Line number	Course route	Line
		LGV Sud-Est
429, 431		LGV Atlantique
408		LGV Bretagne-Pays de la Loire
216, 226	112, 222, 250	LGV Nord
226		LGV Interconnexion Est
		LGV Rhône-Alpes
		LGV Méditerranée
005	100	LGV Est
		LGV Perpignan–Figueres
014	140	LGV Rhin-Rhône
	303	LGV Sud Europe Atlantique

- Under Construction
  - Contournement Nîmes – Montpellier
  - Turin–Lyon high-speed railway
- Projected
  - LGV Bordeaux–Toulouse
  - LGV Poitiers–Limoges
  - LGV Provence-Alpes-Côte d'Azur
- Proposed
  - Transversale Alpes Auvergne Atlantique
  - LGV Montpellier–Perpignan
  - LGV Normandie
  - LGV Picardie

== Interregional lines (SNCF) ==
=== Radial lines ===
Centered on Paris, from the north and clockwise:

- Paris–Lille railway
- Creil–Jeumont railway (toward Brussels)
- La Plaine–Hirson (via Soissons and Laon)
- Paris–Strasbourg railway (via Épernay and Nancy)
- Paris–Mulhouse railway (via Troyes and Vesoul)
- Paris–Marseille railway (via Dijon and Lyon)
- Moret–Lyon railway (via Nevers, Roanne and Saint-Étienne)
- Orléans–Montauban railway (via Limoges)
- Paris–Bordeaux railway (via Orléans and Tours)
- Paris–Brest railway (via Le Mans and Rennes)
- Mantes-la-Jolie–Cherbourg railway (via Caen)
- Paris–Le Havre railway (via Rouen)
- Épinay-Villetaneuse–Le Tréport-Mers railway (via Persan-Beaumont and Beauvais)

=== International lines ===
- Fives–Mouscron railway (Belgium, via Roubaix)
- Fives–Tournai railway (Belgium, via Baisieux)
- Douai–Quiévrain (Belgium, via Valenciennes)
- Hautmont–Mons railway (Belgium, via Feignies)
- Metz–Luxembourg railway (via Zoufftgen)
- Metz–Überherrn (Germany, freight only, abandoned between Metz and Anzeling)
- Rémilly–Saarbrücken railway (Germany)
- Appenweier–Strasbourg railway (Germany, via Kehl)
- Mulhouse–Müllheim (Germany)
- Strasbourg–Basel railway (Switzerland, via Mulhouse)
- Besançon–Le Locle-Col-des-Roches (Switzerland, via Morteau)
- Frasne–Les Verrières (Switzerland, via Pontarlier)
- Dijon–Vallorbe (Switzerland, via Dole and Frasne)
- Lyon–Geneva railway (Switzerland, via Ambérieu and Bellegarde)
- Annemasse–Geneva railway (Switzerland, partly under construction)
- Longeray-Léaz–Le Bouveret (Switzerland, via Annemasse and Évian)
- Turin–Modane railway (Italy, via Fréjus Rail Tunnel)
- Cuneo–Ventimiglia (Italy, via Tende and Breil-sur-Roya)
- Marseille–Ventimiglia railway (Italy, via Toulon and Nice)
- Narbonne–Portbou railway (Spain)
- Portet-Saint-Simon–Puigcerdà railway (Spain, via Pamiers and Foix)
- Pau–Canfranc railway (abandoned beyond Bedous)
- Bordeaux–Irun railway (Spain, via Dax and Bayonne)

Abandoned:

- Mont Cenis Pass Railway (Italy, via the Mont Cenis Pass prior to the Fréjus Rail Tunnel)

=== Other interregional lines ===
==== Northern France ====
- Amagne-Lucquy–Revigny (freight only, abandoned beyond Challerange)
- Amiens–Rouen railway
- Fives–Hirson (via Valenciennes and Aulnoye)
- Hirson–Amagne-Lucquy (abandoned beyond Liart)
- Longueau–Boulogne railway
- Mohon–Thionville
- Pierrelaye–Creil
- Reims–Laon railway
- Saint-Denis–Dieppe railway (abandoned beyond Gisors)
- Saint-Just-en-Chaussée–Douai (via Montdidier, Péronne and Cambrai, partly abandoned)
- Soissons–Givet (via Reims and Charleville-Mézières, Soissons-Bazoches abandoned)
- Trilport–Bazoches

==== Eastern France ====
- Andelot-en-Montagne–La Cluse (via Champagnole, Saint-Claude and Oyonnax)
- Berthelming–Sarreguemines
- Blainville-Damelevières–Lure (via Épinal)
- Bologne–Pagny-sur-Meuse (via Neufchâteau, partly abandoned)
- Culmont-Chalindrey–Toul (via Neufchâteau)
- Coolus–Sens (via Troyes, freight only, partly abandoned)
- Le Coteau–Montchanin (via Paray-le-Monial, partly abandoned)
- Dijon–Saint-Amour (via Louhans)
- Gretz-Armainvilliers–Sézanne (abandoned beyond La Ferté-Gaucher)
- Haguenau–Hargarten-Falck (partly abandoned)
- Is-sur-Tille–Culmont-Chalindrey
- Longueville–Esternay (abandoned beyond Villiers-Saint-Georges)
- Mâcon–Ambérieu (via Bourg-en-Bresse)
- Mommenheim–Sarreguemines
- Mouchard–Bourg-en-Bresse (via Lons-le-Saunier)
- Moulins–Mâcon (abandoned beyond Paray-le-Monial)
- Paray-le-Monial–Givors (via Lozanne and Tassin)
- Saint-Hilaire-au-Temple–Hagondange (via Sainte-Menehould and Verdun)
- Strasbourg–Saint-Dié (via Molsheim)
- Villeneuve-Saint-Georges–Montargis (abandoned beyond Malesherbes)

Abandoned:

- Jessains–Sorcy
- Lutzelbourg–Drulingen
- Mézy–Romilly-sur-Seine
- Montargis–Sens
- Saint-Julien (Troyes)–Saint-Florentin-Vergigny

==== Southern France ====
- Agen–Vic-en-Bigorre railway (freight only, abandoned beyond Auch)
- Béziers-Neussargues (ligne des Causses, via Millau)
- Bordeaux–Sète railway (via Montauban, Toulouse and Narbonne)
- Bourges–Miécaze (abandoned beyond Montluçon)
- Brive-la-Gaillarde–Toulouse railway (via Figeac and Gaillac)
- Clermont-Ferrand–Saint-Just-sur-Loire
- Coutras–Tulle (via Périgueux)
- Eygurande-Merlines–Clermont-Ferrand
- Givors–Grezan (Grezan = Nîmes, right Rhône bank)
- Limoges–Périgueux
- Livron–Aspres-sur-Buëch
- Lyon–Marseille (via Grenoble and Aix-en-Provence)
- Montluçon–Saint-Sulpice-Laurière (via Guéret)
- Morcenx–Bagnères-de-Bigorre (via Mont-de-Marsan and Tarbes)
- Port-Sainte-Marie–Riscle (freight only, abandoned beyond Condom)
- Saint-Georges-d'Aurac–Saint-Étienne (via Le Puy en Velay)
- Saint-Germain-des-Fossés–Nîmes (Ligne des Cévennes, via Gannat, Clermont-Ferrand and Alès)
- Souillac–Viescamp-sous-Jallès
- Tarascon–Sète (via Nîmes and Montpellier)
- Toulouse–Bayonne railway (via Pau)

==== Western France ====
- Brétigny–La Membrolle-sur-Choisille (via Dourdan and Vendôme)
- Chartres–Bordeaux (via Saumur, Niort and Saintes, partly abandoned)
- Châteaubriant–Rennes
- Évreux–Quetteville (via Pont-Audemer, freight only, abandoned between Évreux and Glos-Montfort)
- Limoges-Bénédictins–Angoulême
- Lison–Lamballe railway (via Saint-Lô, Dol-de-Bretagne and Dinan)
- Le Mans–Angers railway
- Le Mans–Mézidon (via Alençon)
- Mignaloux-Nouaillé–Bersac (abandoned beyond Le Dorat)
- Nantes–Saintes (via La Rochelle)
- Paris–Chartres (via Gallardon, abandoned between Paris and Gallardon)
- Rennes–Redon railway
- Les Sables-d'Olonne–Tours (via Bressuire and Chinon, partly abandoned)
- Saint-Benoît–Le Blanc (abandoned beyond Jardres)
- Saint-Cyr–Surdon (part of Paris–Granville connection)
- Savenay–Landerneau railway (via Redon, Vannes and Quimper)
- Tours–Le Mans railway
- Tours–Saint-Nazaire railway

Abandoned:

- La Chapelle-Anthenaise–Flers

== Regional lines (SNCF) ==
=== Alsace ===
- Colmar–Metzeral
- Lutterbach–Kruth (via Cernay)
- Sélestat–Saverne (abandoned beyond Molsheim)
- Strasbourg–Lauterbourg
- Vendenheim–Wissembourg

Abandoned:

- Bouxwiller–Ingwiller
- Steinbourg–Obermodern

=== Aquitaine ===
- Bayonne–Saint-Jean-Pied-de-Port railway
- Dax–Mont-de-Marsan (freight only, partly abandoned)
- Lamothe–Arcachon
- Libourne–Le Buisson (via Bergerac)
- Niversac–Agen
- Puyoô–Dax
- Ravezies–Pointe-de-Grave
- Saint-Sever–Hagetmau
- Siorac-en-Périgord–Cazoulès (abandoned beyond Sarlat-la-Canéda)

Abandoned:

- Marmande–Mont-de-Marsan
- Nérac–Mont-de-Marsan
- Penne-d'Agenais–Tonneins

=== Auvergne ===
- Commentry–Gannat
- Montluçon–Moulins (abandoned beyond Commentry)
- Bort-les-Orgues–Neussargues (partly abandoned)
- La Ferté-Hauterive–Gannat (partly abandoned)
- Figeac–Arvant (via Aurillac)
- Laqueuille–Le Mont-Dore
- Saint-Germain-des-Fossés–Darsac (partly abandoned)
- Souillac–Viescamp-sous-Jallès (abandoned between Souillac and Saint-Denis-près-Martel)
- Vichy–Riom

Abandoned:

- Lapeyrouse–Volvic

=== Basse-Normandie ===
- Argentan–Granville (via Flers)
- Lisieux–Trouville-Deauville
- Mézidon–Trouville-Deauville railway (abandoned between Mézidon and Dives-Cabourg)
- Pont-l'Évêque–Honfleur (freight only, abandoned between Pont-l'Évêque and Quetteville)
- Saint-Lô–Guilberville (freight only, abandoned beyond Condé-sur-Vire)

=== Bourgogne ===
- Clamecy–Nevers (freight only, partly abandoned)
- Cravant-Bazarnes–Dracy-St-Loup (via Avallon and Saulieu)
- Clamecy–Gilly-sur-Loire (abandoned beyond Cercy-la-Tour)
- Dijon–Is-sur-Tille
- Étang–Santenay (via Autun, abandoned beyond Dracy-Saint-Loup)
- Laroche–Migennes–Cosne (via Auxerre and Clamecy, abandoned beyond Entrains)
- Maison-Dieu–Les Laumes (freight only, abandoned Maison-Dieu and Époisses)
- Nevers–Chagny (via Le Creusot)
- Tamnay-Châtillon–Château-Chinon (freight only)

=== Bretagne ===
- Auray–Quiberon railway
- Auray–Pontivy (freight only)
- Guingamp–Carhaix railway
- Guingamp–Paimpol railway
- Morlaix–Roscoff
- Plouaret–Lannion railway
- Quimper–Pont-l'Abbé (freight only, abandoned beyond Pluguffan)
- Rennes–Saint-Malo railway
- Rosporden–Concarneau (freight only, abandoned beyond Coat-Conq)
- Saint-Brieuc–Pontivy (freight only, abandoned beyond Loudéac)

Abandoned:

- Miniac-Morvan–La Gouesnière-Cancale-St-Méloir
- Ploërmel–La Brohinière
- Saint-Brieuc–Le Légué
- Vitré–Pontorson

=== Centre ===
- Auxy-Juranville–Bourges (freight only, abandoned between Auxy-Juranville and Les Bordes, and beyond Argent-sur-Sauldre)
- Le Blanc–Argent-sur-Sauldre railway (metric railway, abandoned between Le Blanc and Buzançais, and beyond Salbris)
- Chartres–Dreux (freight only)
- Chartres–Orléans (freight only)
- Gien–Argent (freight only, abandoned beyond Poilly-lez-Gien)
- Orléans–Gien (freight only, abandoned beyond Les Bordes)
- Pont-de-Braye–Blois (freight only, partly abandoned)
- Tours–Châteauroux (freight only beyond Loches)
- Vierzon–Saincaize (via Bourges)
- Vierzon–Saint-Pierre-des-Corps
- Villefranche-sur-Cher–Blois (freight only, abandoned beyond Romorantin-Lanthenay)

Abandoned:

- Orléans–Montargis
- Saint-Germain-du-Puy–Cosne-Cours-sur-Loire

=== Champagne-Ardenne ===
- Blesme-Haussignémont–Chaumont (via Saint-Dizier)
- Châlons-en-Champagne–Reims
- Charleville–Hirson (abandoned beyond Tournes)
- Épernay–Reims
- Liart–Tournes
- Oiry–Romilly-sur-Seine (freight only, abandoned beyond Sézanne)

Abandoned:

- Fère-Champenoise–Vitry-le-François
- Saint-Dizier–Doulevant-le-Château

=== Franche-Comté ===
- Dole–Belfort (via Besançon)
- Franois–Arc-et-Senans (part of connection Besançon–Bourg-en-Bresse)
- Montbozon–Lure (freight only, abandoned between Montbozon and Villersexel)
- Voujeaucourt–Saint-Hippolyte (freight only, abandoned beyond Pont-de-Roide)

Abandoned:

- Besançon–Vesoul

=== Haute-Normandie ===
- Bréauté-Beuzeville–Fécamp
- Bréauté-Beuzeville–Gravenchon–Port-Jérôme (freight only)
- Le Havre-Graville–Tourville-les-Ifs (abandoned beyond Rolleville)
- Malaunay–Dieppe
- Montérolier-Buchy–Motteville (freight only)
- Motteville–Saint-Valéry-en-Caux
- Rouxmesnil–Eu (freight only, abandoned beyond Bailly-en-Rivière)
- Serquigny–Oissel

Abandoned:

- Montérolier-Buchy–Saint-Saëns railway

=== Île-de-France ===
- Chemin de fer de Petite Ceinture
- Grande Ceinture line
- Achères–Pontoise
- Aulnay-sous-Bois–Aéroport Charles de Gaulle (Ligne de Roissy)
- Corbeil-Essonnes–Montereau
- Ermont-Eaubonne–Valmondois
- Esbly–Crécy-la-Chapelle
- Flamboin-Gouaix–Montereau (freight only)
- Grigny–Corbeil-Essonnes
- Montsoult-Maffliers–Luzarches
- Plaisir-Grignon–Épône-Mézières
- Paris–Versailles-Rive-Gauche (Ligne des Invalides)
- Paris-Saint-Lazare–Ermont-Eaubonne
- Paris–Mantes-Station (via Conflans-Sainte-Honorine)
- Paris–Versailles-Rive-Droite (via Saint-Cloud)
- Paris–Saint-Germain-en-Laye
- La Plaine–Ermont-Eaubonne
- Saint-Cloud–Saint-Nom-la-Bretèche

=== Languedoc-Roussillon ===
- Bessèges–Robiac
- Carcassonne–Rivesaltes (via Limoux, abandoned between Quillan and Axat)
- Elne–Arles-sur-Tech (freight only, abandoned beyond Le Boulou)
- Le Monastier–La Bastide-Saint-Laurent-les-Bains (via Mende)
- Narbonne–Bize (freight only)
- Perpignan–Villefranche-de-Conflent
- Saint-Césaire–Le Grau-du-Roi
- Le Teil–Alès (abandoned between Le Teil and Robiac)
- Villefranche-de-Conflent–Latour-de-Carol (Ligne de Cerdagne, metre gauge railway)

Abandoned:

- Colombiers–Quarante-Cruzy
- Paulhan–Montpellier

=== Limousin ===
- Busseau-sur-Creuse–Ussel (via Aubusson, abandoned between Felletin and La Courtine)
- Le Dorat–Limoges
- Nexon–Brive-la-Gaillarde (via Saint-Yrieix)Not in use between St Yrieix and Objat
- Le Palais–Eygurande-Merlines (via Ussel)
- Tulle–Meymac
- Vieilleville–Bourganeuf (freight only)

=== Lorraine ===
- Arches–Saint-Dié railway
- Épinal–Bussang (abandoned beyond Remiremont)
- Frouard–Novéant
- Jarville-la-Malgrange–Mirecourt
- Lérouville–Metz
- Longuyon–Mont-Saint-Martin (via Longwy)
- Longuyon–Pagny-sur-Moselle
- Lunéville–Saint-Dié
- Merrey–Hymont-Mattaincourt (via Vittel)
- Neufchâteau–Épinal (abandoned between Gironcourt and Mirecourt, and beyond Hymont)
- Réding–Metz
- Thionville–Anzeling
- Thionville–Apach
- Toul–Rosières-aux-Salines (freight only, abandoned between Toul and Chaligny)

Abandoned:

- Bettelainville–Waldwisse
- Fontoy–Audun-le-Tiche

=== Midi-Pyrénées ===
- Capdenac–Rodez
- Castelnaudary–Rodez (via Castres and Albi, abandoned between Revel and La Crémade, and between Castres and Ranteil)
- Castelsarrasin–Beaumont-de-Lomagne (freight only)
- Castres–Bédarieux (abandoned beyond Mazamet)
- Lannemezan–Arreau-Cadéac (freight only)
- Montauban–La Crémade (abandoned between Montauban and Saint-Sulpice)
- Montréjeau–Luchon
- Sévérac-le-Château–Rodez
- Tessonnières–Albi
- Toulouse–Auch
- Tournemire-Roquefort - Le Vigan

=== Nord-Pas-de-Calais ===
- Arras–Dunkirk railway
- Arras–Saint-Pol-sur-Ternoise
- Boulogne–Calais railway
- Busigny–Somain (via Cambrai)
- Coudekerque-Branche–Fontinettes railway (Dunkerque–Calais)
- Ferrière-la-Grande–Cousolre (freight only)
- Fives–Abbeville (via Béthune, abandoned beyond Saint-Pol-sur-Ternoise)
- La Madeleine–Comines-France
- Lens–Don - Sainghin railway
- Lens–Ostricourt
- Lille–Fontinettes railway (Lille–Calais via Armentières and Saint-Omer)
- Lourches–Valenciennes
- Saint-Pol-sur-Ternoise–Étaples

=== Pays de la Loire ===
- Clisson–Cholet
- Commequiers–St-Gilles-Croix-de-Vie
- Nantes–La Roche-sur-Yon (via Sainte-Pazanne and Challans, abandoned beyond Commequiers)
- La Possonnière–Niort (abandoned beyond Cholet)
- Sainte-Pazanne–Pornic
- Saint-Hilaire-de-Chaléons–Paimbœuf (freight only)
- Saint-Nazaire–Le Croisic

Abandoned:

- La Flèche–Vivy
- Nantes–Châteaubriant

=== Picardie ===
- Abbeville–Eu
- Amiens–Laon (via Tergnier)
- Creil–Beauvais
- Ormoy-Villers–Boves (freight only between Ormoy-Villers and Ageux, abandoned between Ageux and Estrées-Saint-Denis)
- Rochy-Condé–Soissons (via Clermont-de-l'Oise, Estrées-Saint-Denis and Compiègne, mostly abandoned)

Abandoned:

- Beauvais-Amiens
- Feuquières–Ponthoile
- Saint-Omer-en-Chaussée–Vers

=== Poitou-Charentes ===
- Beillant–Angoulême (via Cognac)
- Saint-Benoît–La Rochelle (via Niort)
- Saintes–Royan

=== Provence-Alpes-Côte d'Azur ===
- Avignon–Miramas (via Cavaillon and Salon-de-Provence)
- Cannes-la Bocca–Grasse
- Carnoules–Gardanne (abandoned between Brignoles and Peynier)
- Miramas–l'Estaque (via Martigues)
- Nice–Breil-sur-Roya
- La Pauline-Hyères–Les Salins-d'Hyères (abandoned beyond Hyères)
- Rognac–Aix-en-Provence (freight only)
- Veynes–Briançon (via Gap)

Abandoned:

- Les Arcs–Draguignan
- Marseille-Blancarde–Marseille-Prado
- Saint-Auban–Digne

=== Rhône-Alpes ===
- Aix-les-Bains-Le Revard–Annemasse (via Annecy and La Roche-sur-Foron)
- Ligne du Haut-Bugey (Bourg-en-Bresse–Bellegarde)
- Collonges-Fort-l'Écluse – Divonne-les-Bains (freight only, abandoned beyond Gex)
- Le Coteau–Saint-Germain-au-Mont-d'Or (Roanne-Lyon)
- Culoz–Modane railway (via Chambéry)
- Grenoble–Montmélian railway
- Lyon-Croix-Rousse–Trévoux (partly abandoned)
- Lyon-Saint-Clair–Bourg-en-Bresse
- Lyon-Saint-Paul–Montbrison (abandoned beyond Sainte-Foy-l'Argentière)
- La Roche-sur-Foron–Saint-Gervais-les-Bains-Le Fayet
- Saint-André-le-Gaz–Chambéry
- Saint-Gervais–Vallorcine railway (via Chamonix, metric railway)
- Saint-Pierre-d'Albigny–Bourg-Saint-Maurice (Tarentaise)
- Saint-Rambert-d'Albon–Rives (partly abandoned)
- Valence–Moirans railway

== Lines not belonging to the National network ==
=== Corsica ===
- Chemins de fer de la Corse:
  - Bastia–Ajaccio
  - Ponte-Leccia–Calvi
  - Calvi-L'Île-Rousse

=== Provence-Alpes-Côte d'Azur ===
- Nice–Digne

=== Lines of the RATP ===
- Ligne de Sceaux (southern branch of the RER B)

=== Touristic lines ===
- Chemin de Fer de la Baie de Somme
- Chemin de Fer de La Mure
- Chemin de Fer du Blanc-Argent
- Chemin de fer du Montenvers
- Chemin de fer du Vivarais
- Chemin de fer forestier d'Abreschville
- Chemin de fer Froissy-Dompierre
- Chemin de Fer Touristique du Tarn
- Petit train d'Artouste
- Petit train de la Rhune
- Tramway du Cap-Ferret
- Tramway du Mont-Blanc
- Tramway de Pithiviers à Toury

== Abandoned lines ==
=== Western France ===
- Chemin de fer du Finistère
- Chemin de fer des Côtes-du-Nord
- Chemins de fer armoricains
- Chemins de fer du Morbihan
- Île de Ré
- Réseau Breton
  - Réseau Guerlédan
- Tramways d'Ille-et-Vilaine
- Tramways électriques du Finistère

=== Northern France ===
- Chemin de fer d'Anvin à Calais
- Chemin de fer de Boulogne à Bonningues
- Chemin de fer du Cambrésis
- Chemins de fer d'Aire à Fruges et de Rimeux-Gournay à Berck
- Réseau Albert
- Réseau des Bains de Mer
- Tramway à vapeur d'Ardres à Pont d'Ardres
- Somain–Halluin railway (via Orchies, Ascq and Tourcoing)

== See also ==
- Réseau Ferré de France
- Réseau Express Régional
- SNCF
