= Collonges – Fort l'Écluse station =

Railway station in Collonges, France

Collonges – Fort l'Écluse station (French: Gare de Collonges — Fort l'Écluse) is a disused station near the small town of Collonges and the Fort l'Écluse, in the Ain department, eastern France. It is situated on the Bellegarde-Geneva section of the Lyon—Geneva railway at the junction with the Divonne branch line. It is still staffed by a signal operator, who manages trains from Longeray to la Plaine and operates the points twice per day to allow the daily waste disposal train to join or leave the main line. It is remarkable for being one of the last places on the SNCF network with operating semaphore signals from the PLM era. Another curiosity is the solar panel, which powers an automatic point greaser.

== Gallery ==
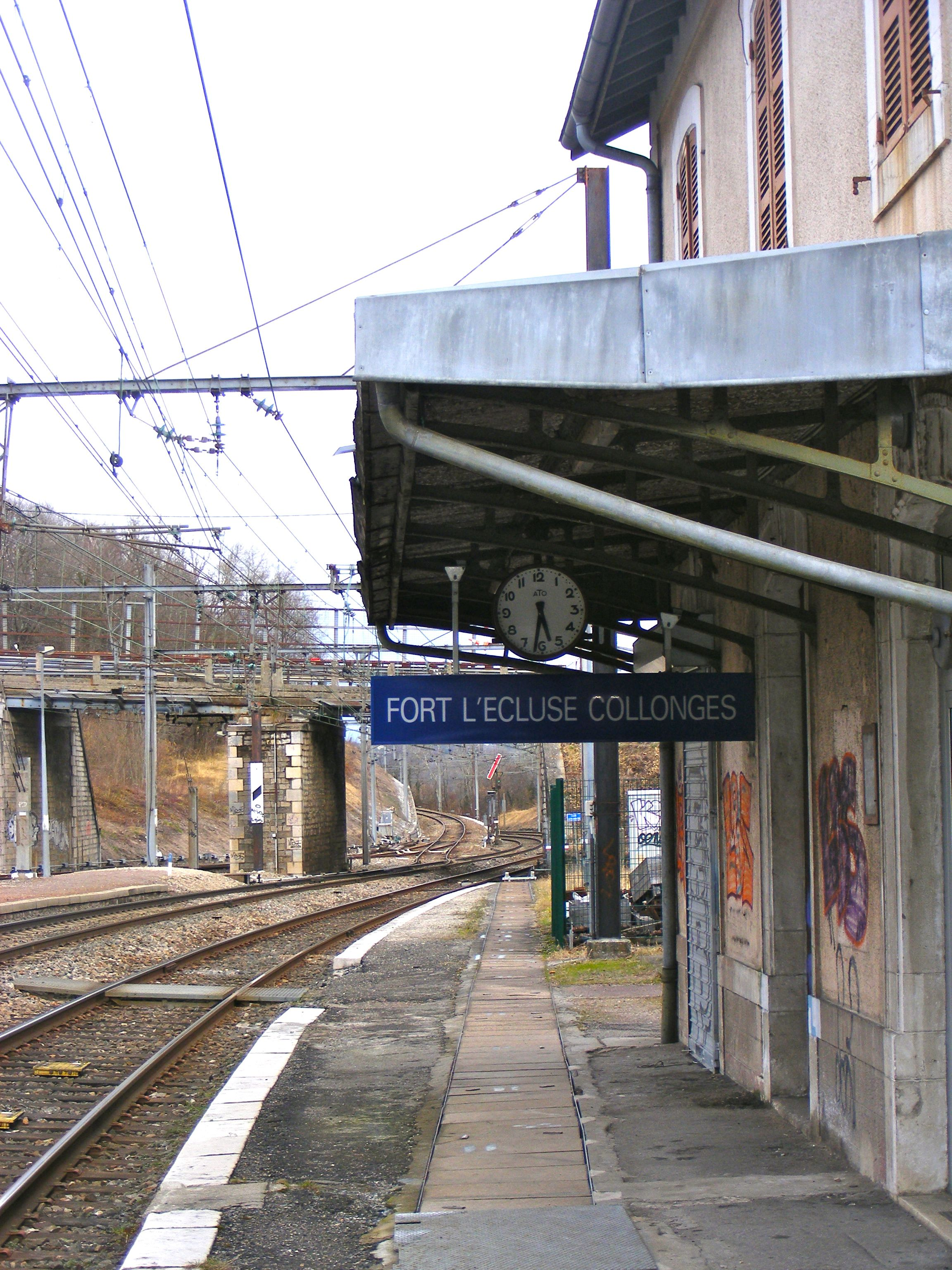
Fort l'Écluse Collonges station is disused. The clock works, although was still on Summer Time .

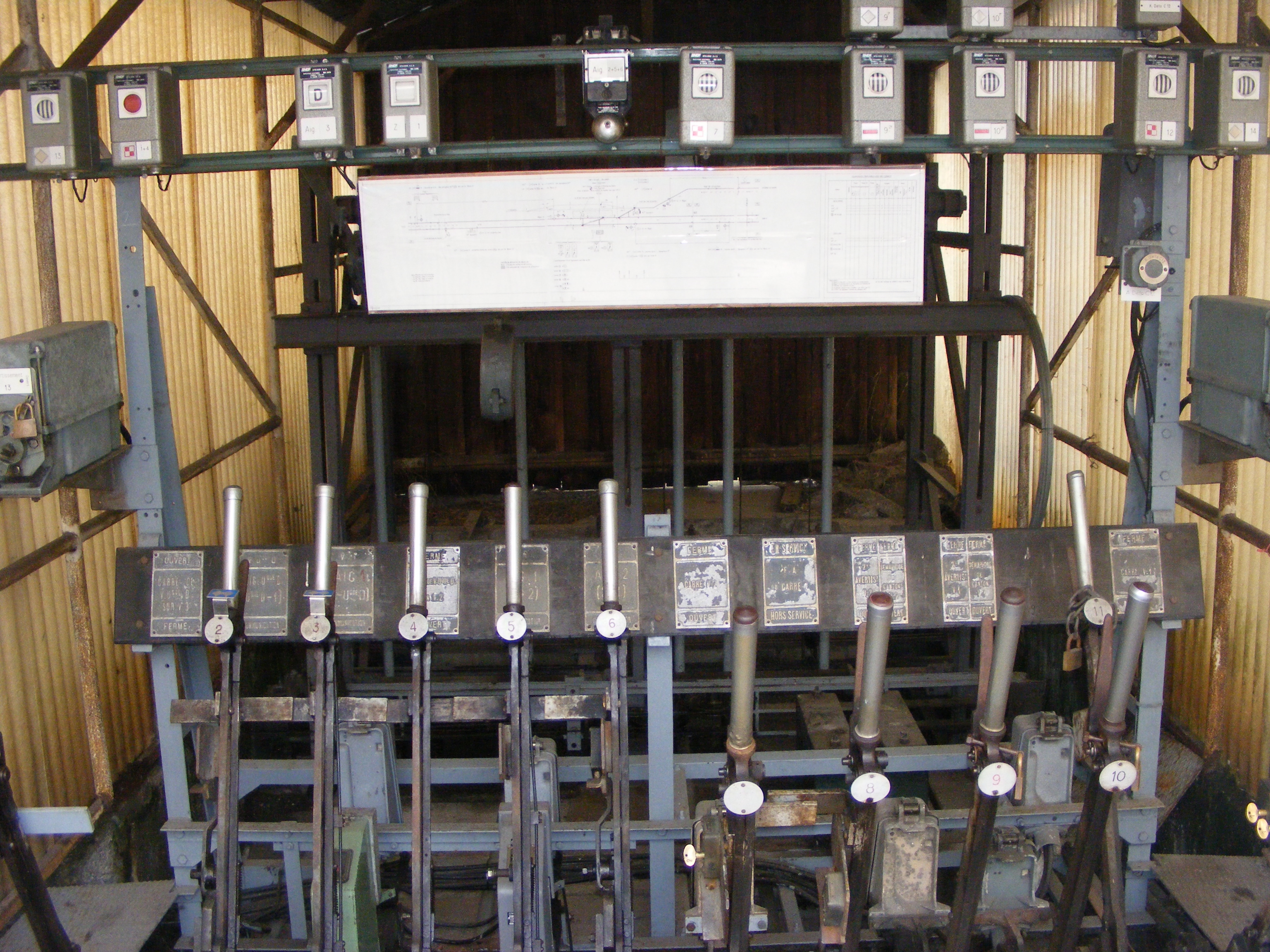
Collonges lever frame.

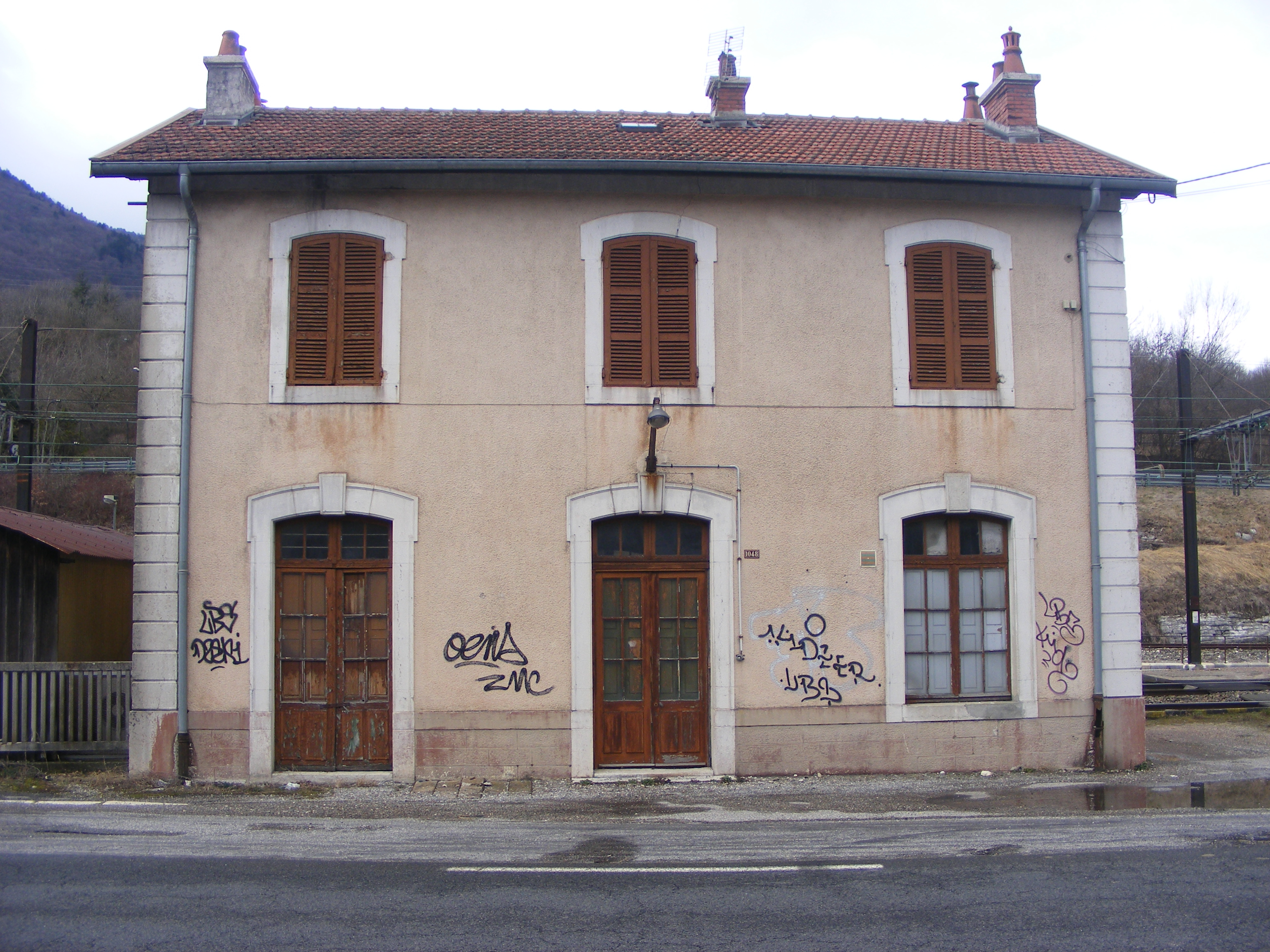
Collonges station seen from the D1206 road.

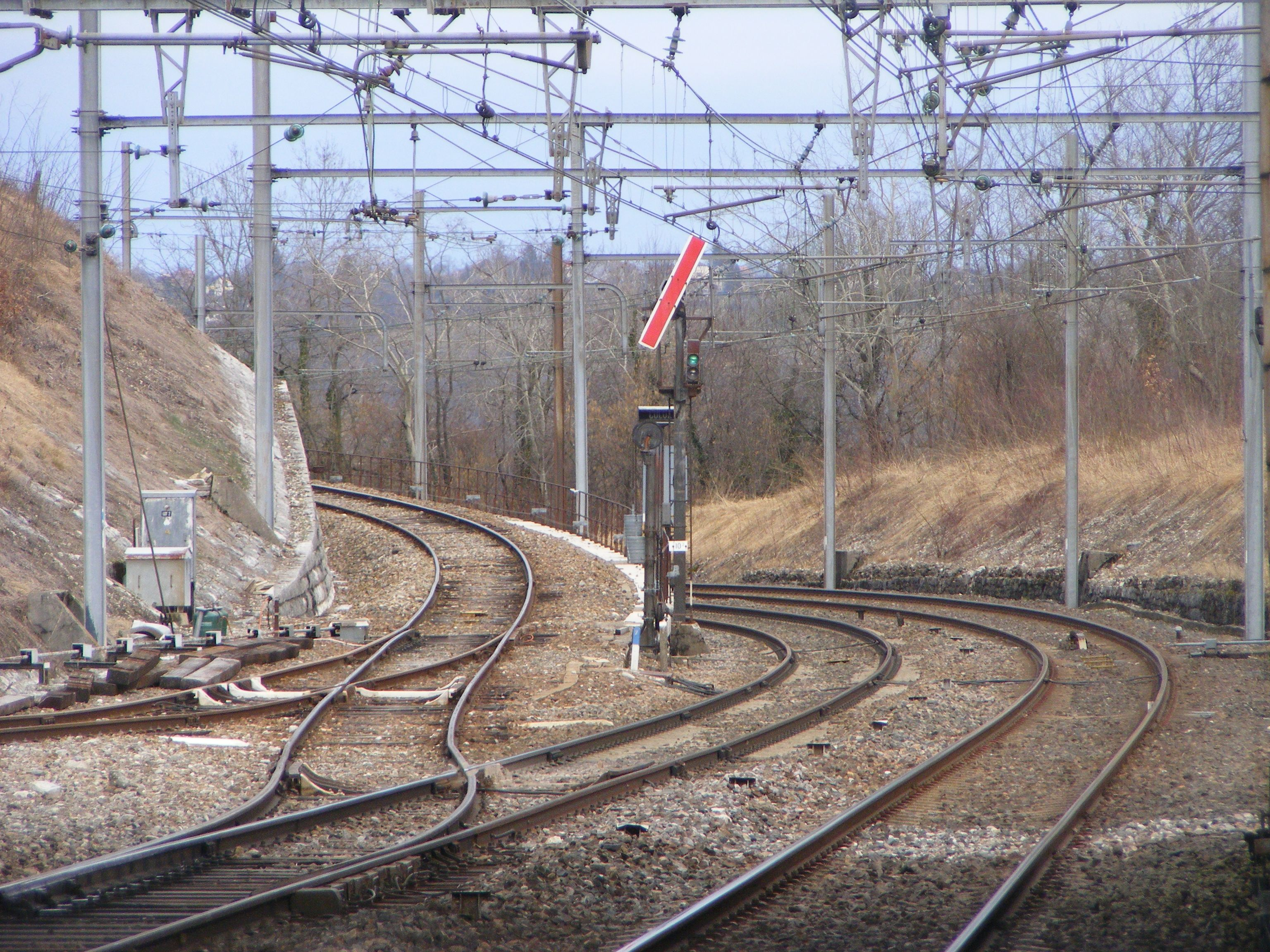
Pre-1938 semaphore signals visible to the East of the station.

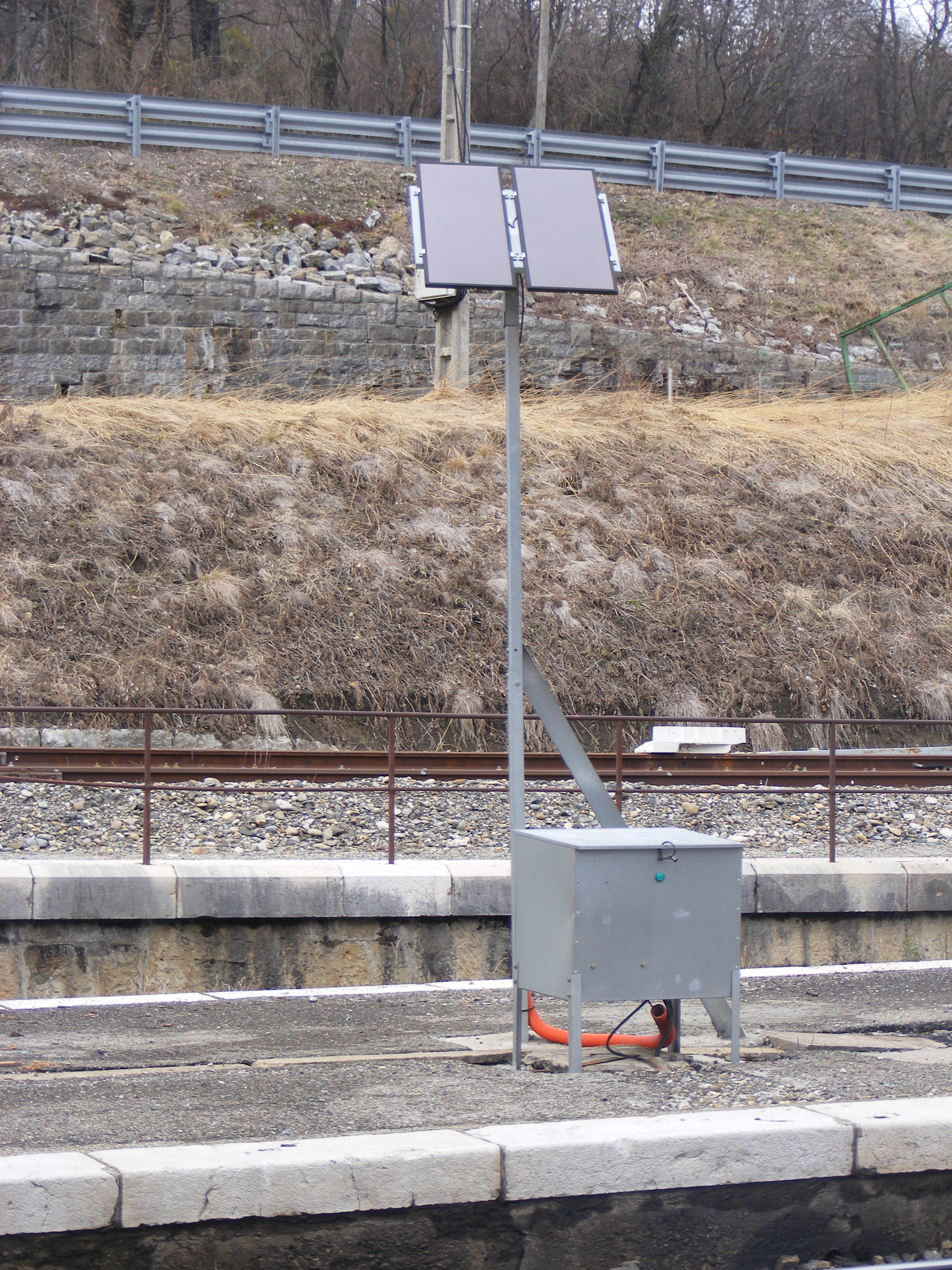
Solar panel used to power an automatic point greaser
