= Morlaix station =

Railway station in Morlaix, France

Coordinates: 48°34′40″N 3°49′58″W

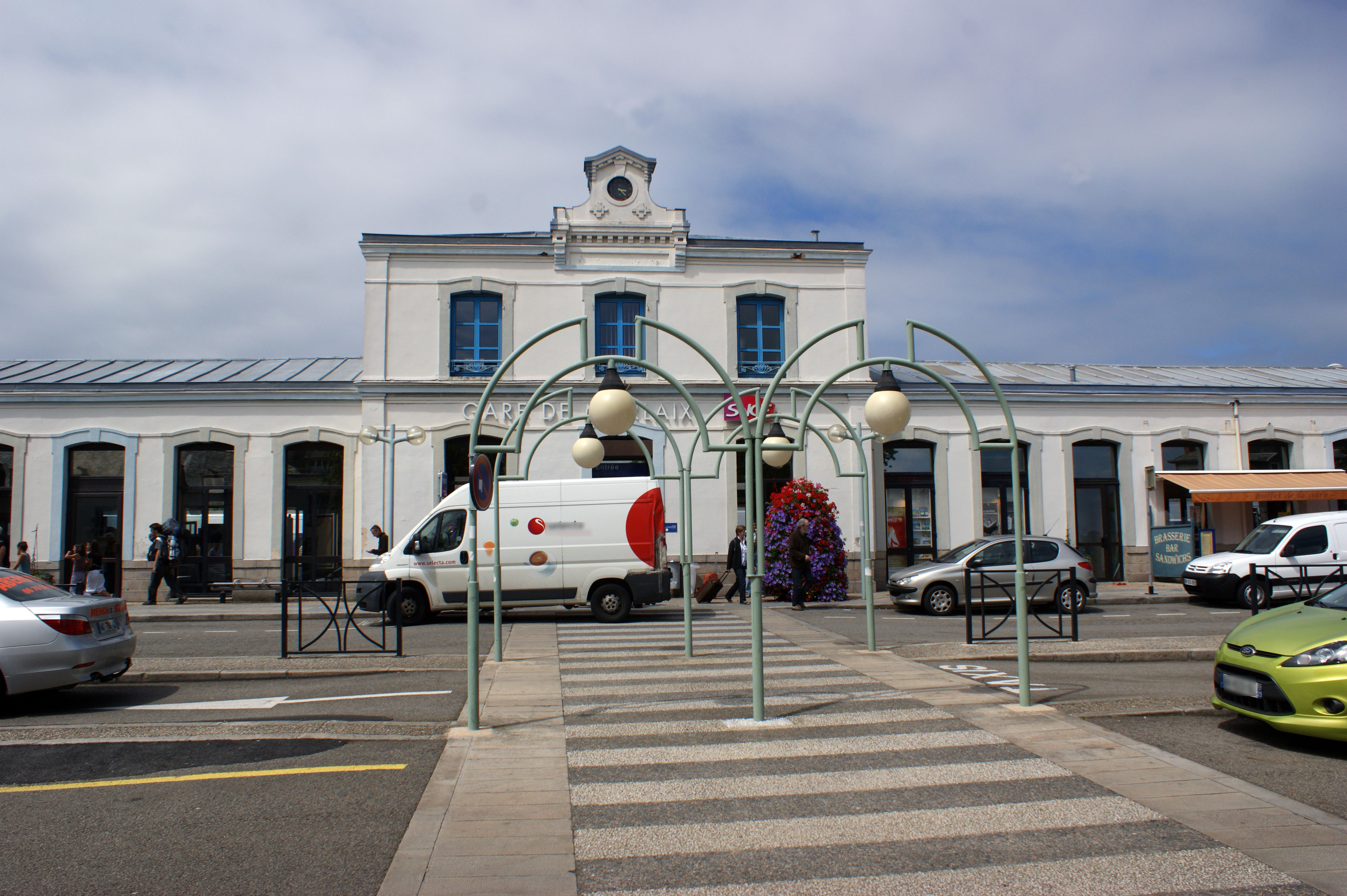
Gare de Morlaix

Morlaix station (French: Gare de Morlaix; Breton: Ti-gar Montroulez) is a railway station serving the town Morlaix, Finistère department, western France. It is situated on the Paris–Brest railway and the branch to Roscoff.

== Services ==
The station is served by high speed trains to Brest and Paris, and regional trains to Brest, Lannion and Rennes.

Preceding station	SNCF	Following station
Landerneau towards Brest	TGV	Plouaret-Trégor towards Montparnasse
Preceding station	TER Bretagne	Following station
Landivisiau towards Brest	1	Plouaret-Trégor towards Rennes
Plouigneau towards Lannion	21	Terminus
Pleyber-Christ towards Brest	22	Terminus

== Bibliography ==
- Euzen, Jean-Pierre (2013). "L'arrivée du chemin de fer en Bretagne Nord" (in French). Paris: Riveneuve éditions. ISBN 978-2-36013-171-6
- Euzen, Jean-Pierre (2015). "L'étoile ferrée morlaisienne" (in French). Paris: Riveneuve éditions. ISBN 978-2-36013-295-9
