= Plouaret–Lannion railway =

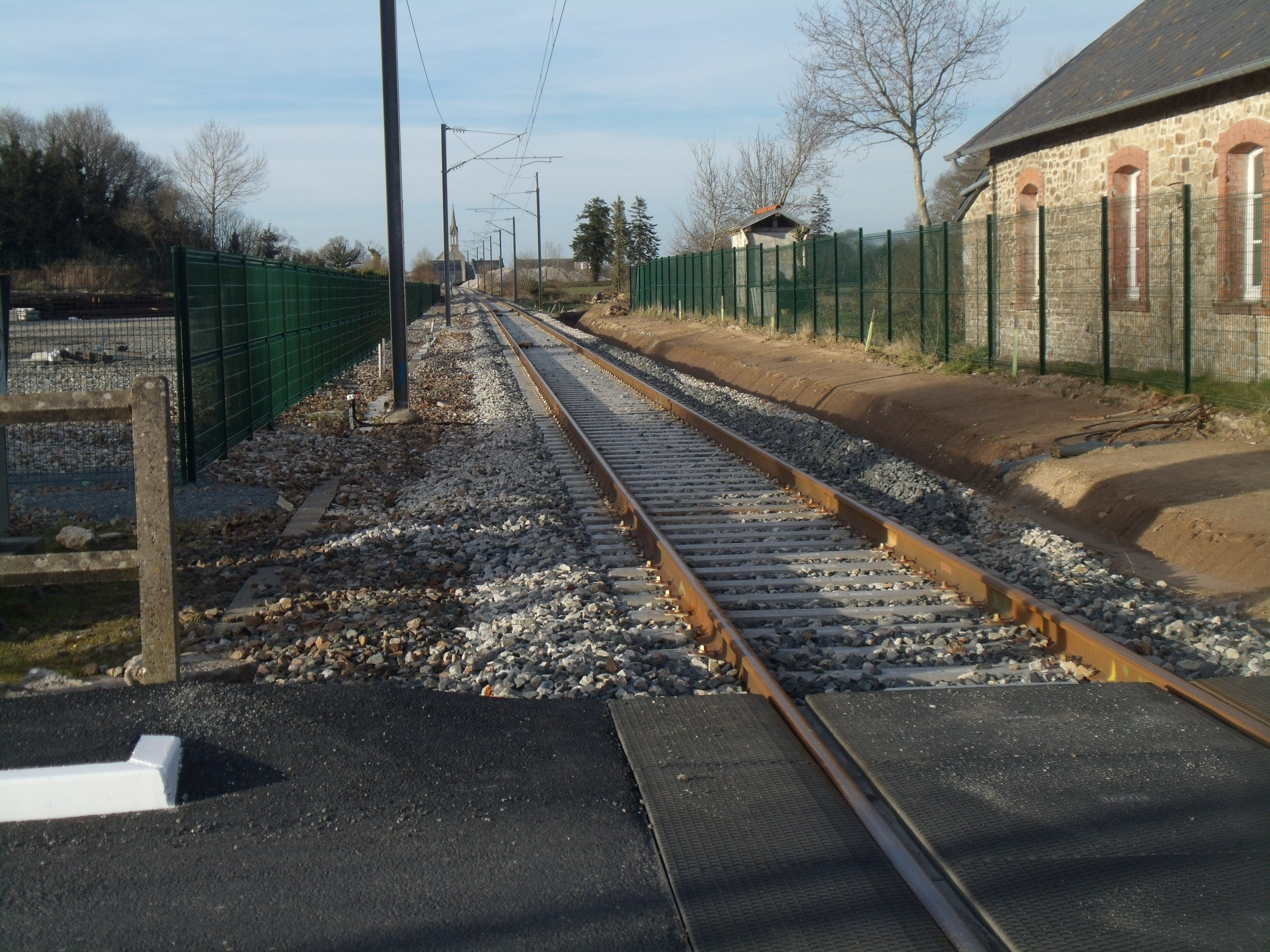
- The line in 2015 at the former Kérauzern Station

Overview
- Status: Operational
- Owner: RFF
- Locale: France (Brittany)
- Termini: Plouaret-Trégor station; Lannion station

Service
- System: SNCF
- Operator(s): SNCF

History
- Opened: November 13, 1881

Technical
- Line length: 16 km (9.9 mi)
- Number of tracks: Single track
- Track gauge: 1,435 mm (4 ft 8 1/2 in) standard gauge
- Electrification: since 2000 25 kV 50 Hz
- Operating speed: 80

The railway from Plouaret to Lannion is a regional railway line between Plouaret and Lannion in Côtes-d'Armor, France.

== Route ==
The line begins in Plouaret-Trégor station, then passes the former Kérauzern station, and ends in Lannion station.

== Line history ==
The line opened on November 13, 1881 and was electrified in 2000.

== Photos of the 2 stations ==
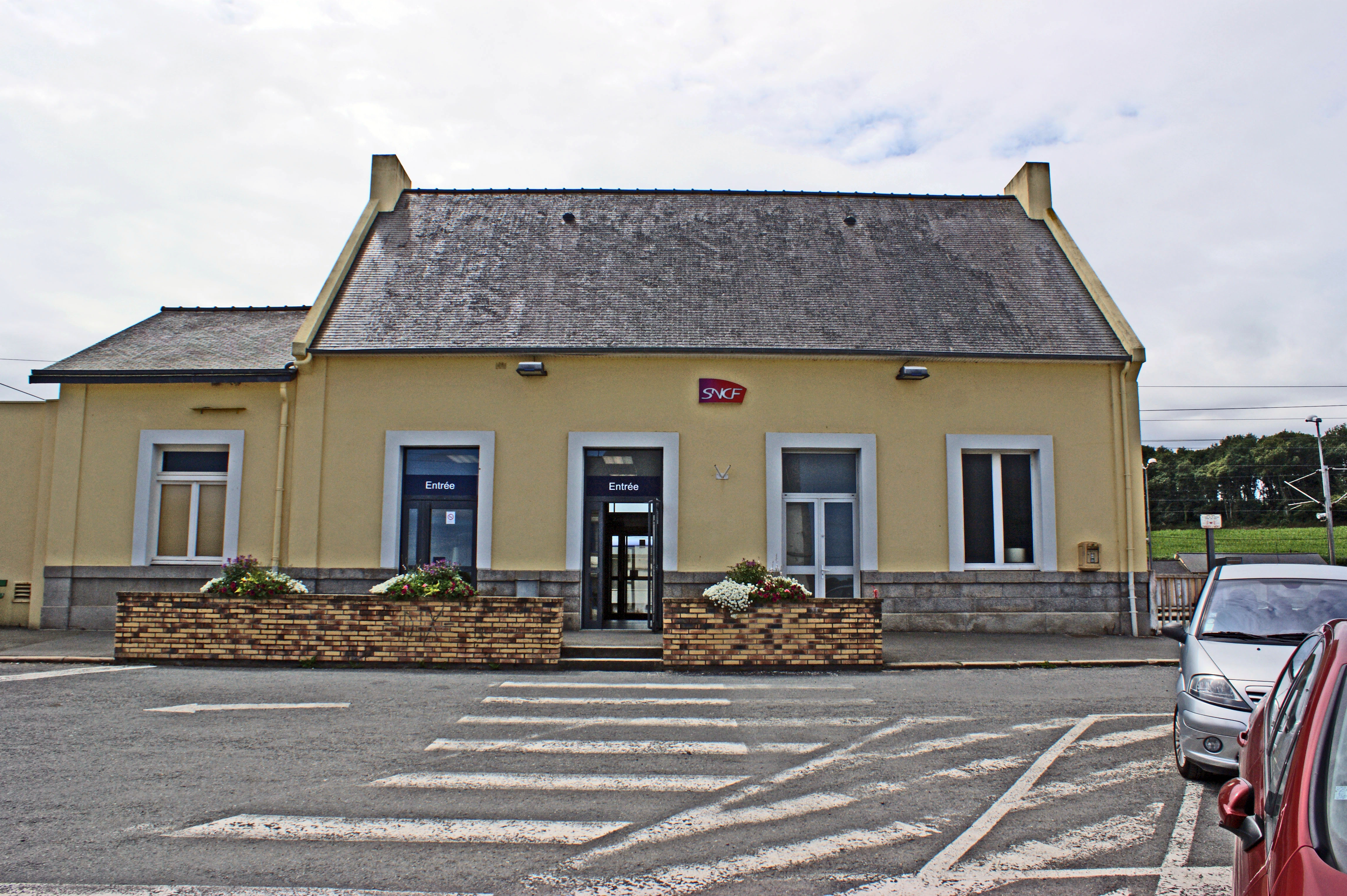
Plouaret-Trégor

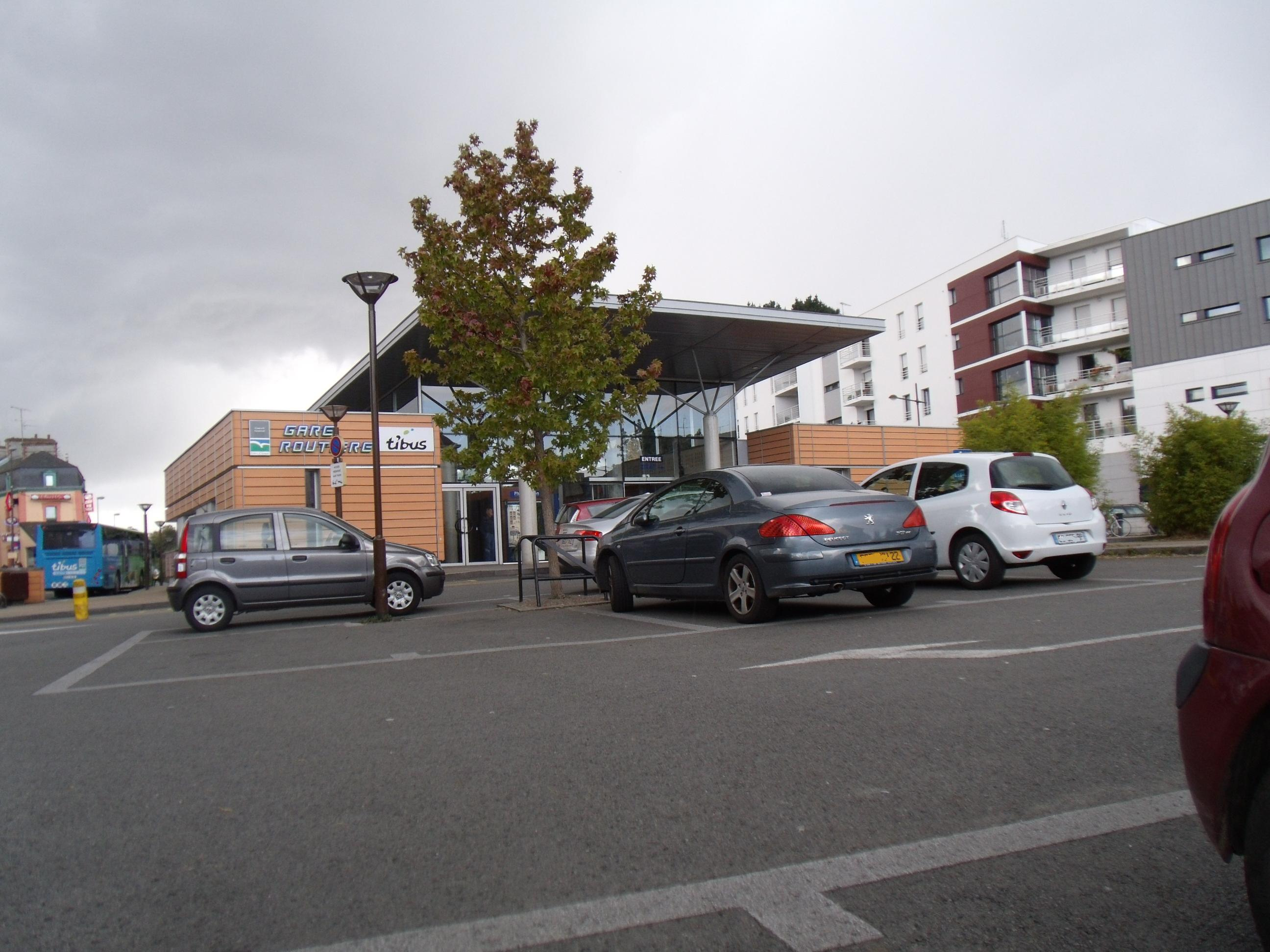
Lannion
