= Lannion station =

Railway station in Lannion, France

Coordinates: 48°43′38″N 3°27′37″W

Lannion
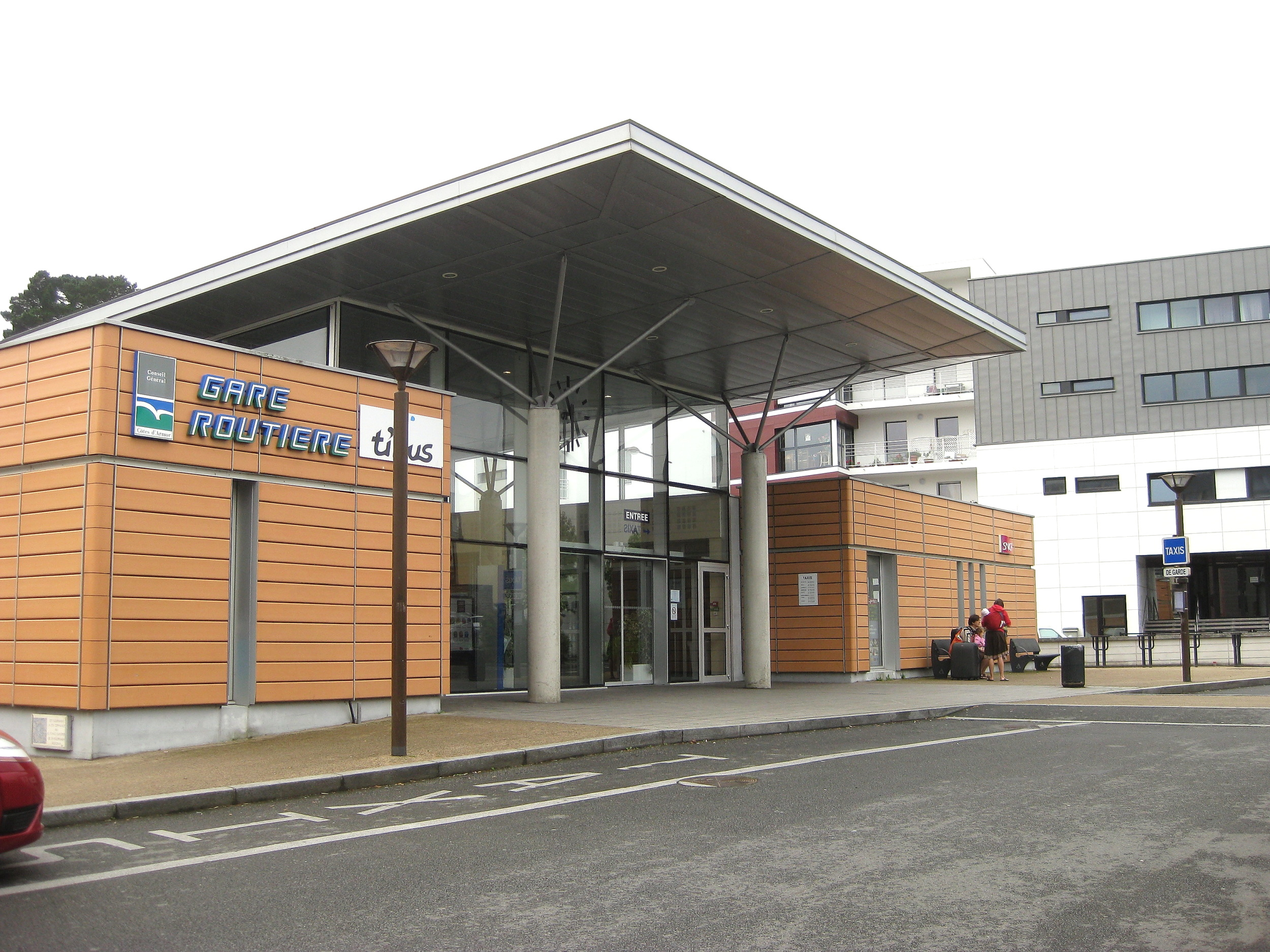

General information
- Location: 1 avenue du Général de Gaulle; 22300 Lannion; Côtes-d'Armor; France
- Elevation: 8 m (26 ft)
- Owner: SNCF
- Operator: SNCF
- Platforms: 1
- Tracks: 2

Other information
- Station code: 87473223

History
- Opened: 13 November 1881

Passengers
- 2018: 192 072

Services
Preceding station	SNCF	Following station
Terminus	TGV	Plouaret-Trégor towards Montparnasse
Preceding station	TER Bretagne	Following station
Terminus	21	Plouaret-Trégor towards Saint-Brieuc or Morlaix
Location

Gare de Lannion is a railway station serving the town Lannion, Côtes-d'Armor department, western France. It is the northern terminus of the Plouaret–Lannion railway. The railway line between Plouaret and Lannion has been electrified in 2000. A new station has been built in Lannion.

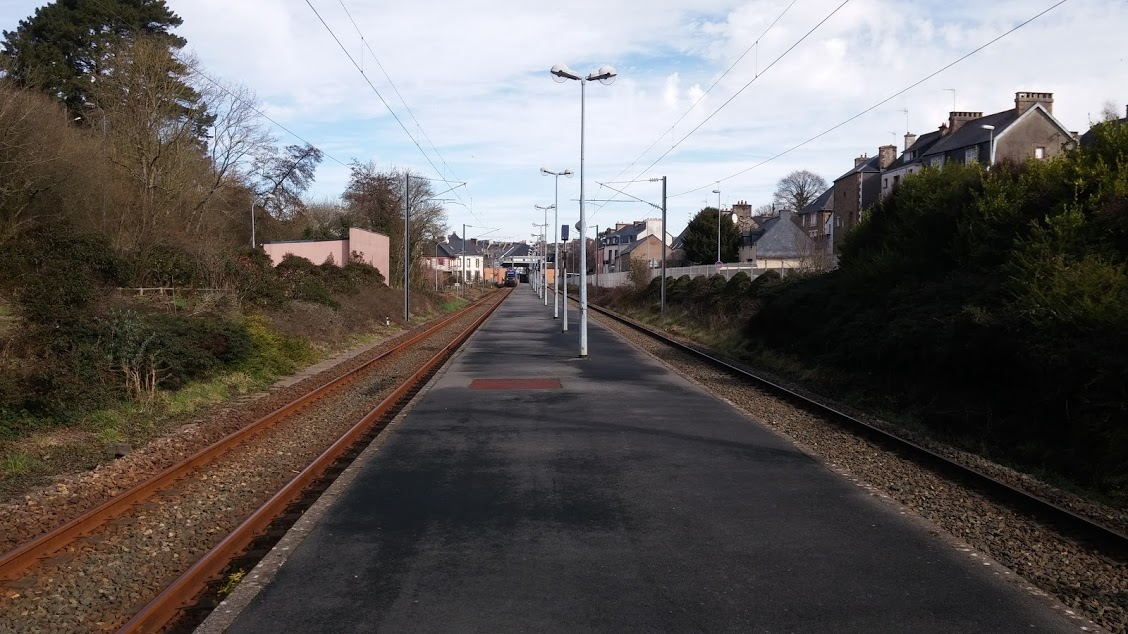
View of Lannion Station Platforms

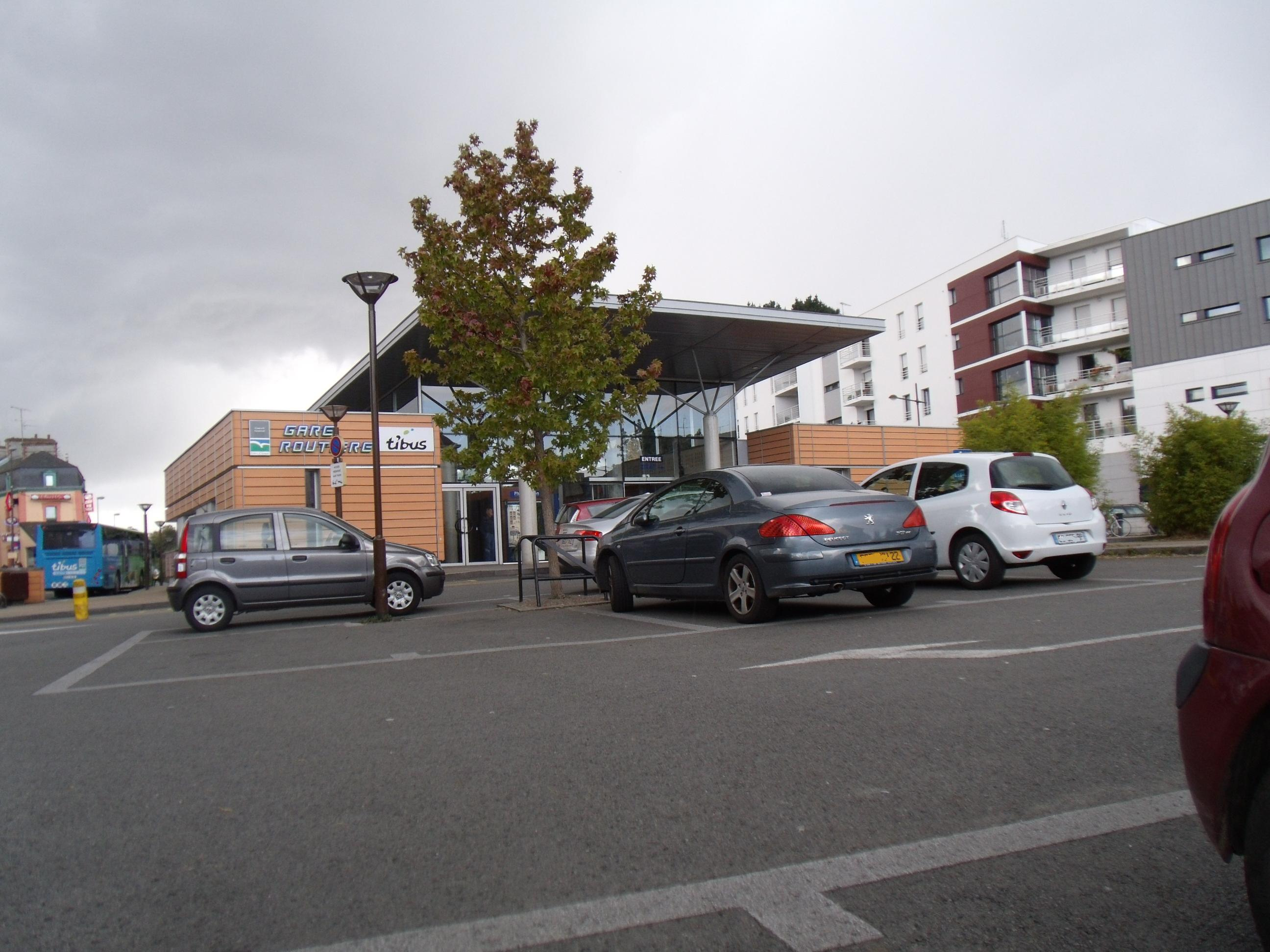
The station

== Services ==
The station is served by high speed trains to Rennes and Paris, and regional trains to Saint-Brieuc and Morlaix.

At the station connection with the Tibus network, a coach service running between Lannion, Trébeurden, Trégastel and Perros-Guirec, is possible.

== At the cinema ==
The former Lannion Station can be seen at the end of the 1946 movie La Bataille du rail (The Battle of the Rails).
