= Plouaret-Trégor station =

Railway station in Plouaret, France

Coordinates: 48°36′22″N 3°28′01″W

Plouaret-Trégor Plouared Treger
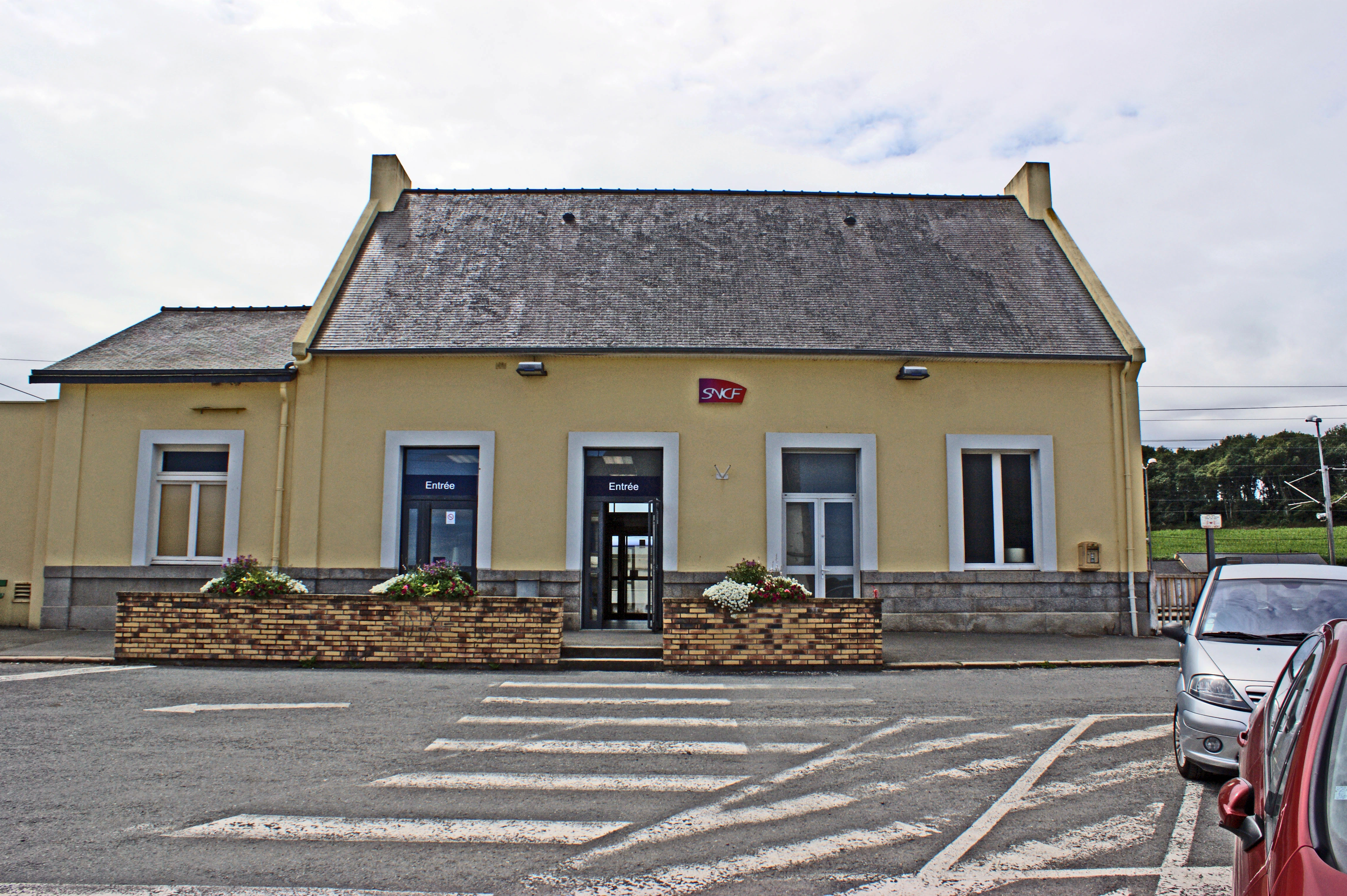

General information
- Location: Place de la Gare; 22420 Plouaret; Côtes-d'Armor; France
- Elevation: 123 m (404 ft)
- Owner: SNCF
- Operator: SNCF
- Lines: Paris–Brest railway Plouaret–Lannion railway
- Platforms: 2
- Tracks: 3

Other information
- Station code: 87473181

History
- Opened: 26 April 1865

Passengers
- 2018: 108 058

Services
Preceding station	SNCF	Following station
Lannion towards	TGV inOui Lannion–Montparnasse	Guingamp towards
Morlaix towards	TGV inOui Brest–Montparnasse	Guingamp towards
Preceding station	TER Bretagne	Following station
Morlaix towards Brest	1	Guingamp towards Rennes
Lannion Terminus	21	Belle-Isle-Bégard towards Saint-Brieuc
Lannion Terminus	21	Plounérin towards Morlaix
Location

Plouaret-Trégor station (French: Gare de Plouaret-Trégor; Breton: Ti-gar Plouared Treger) is a railway station serving the town Plouaret, Côtes-d'Armor department, western France. It is situated on the Paris–Brest railway and the branch line to Lannion.

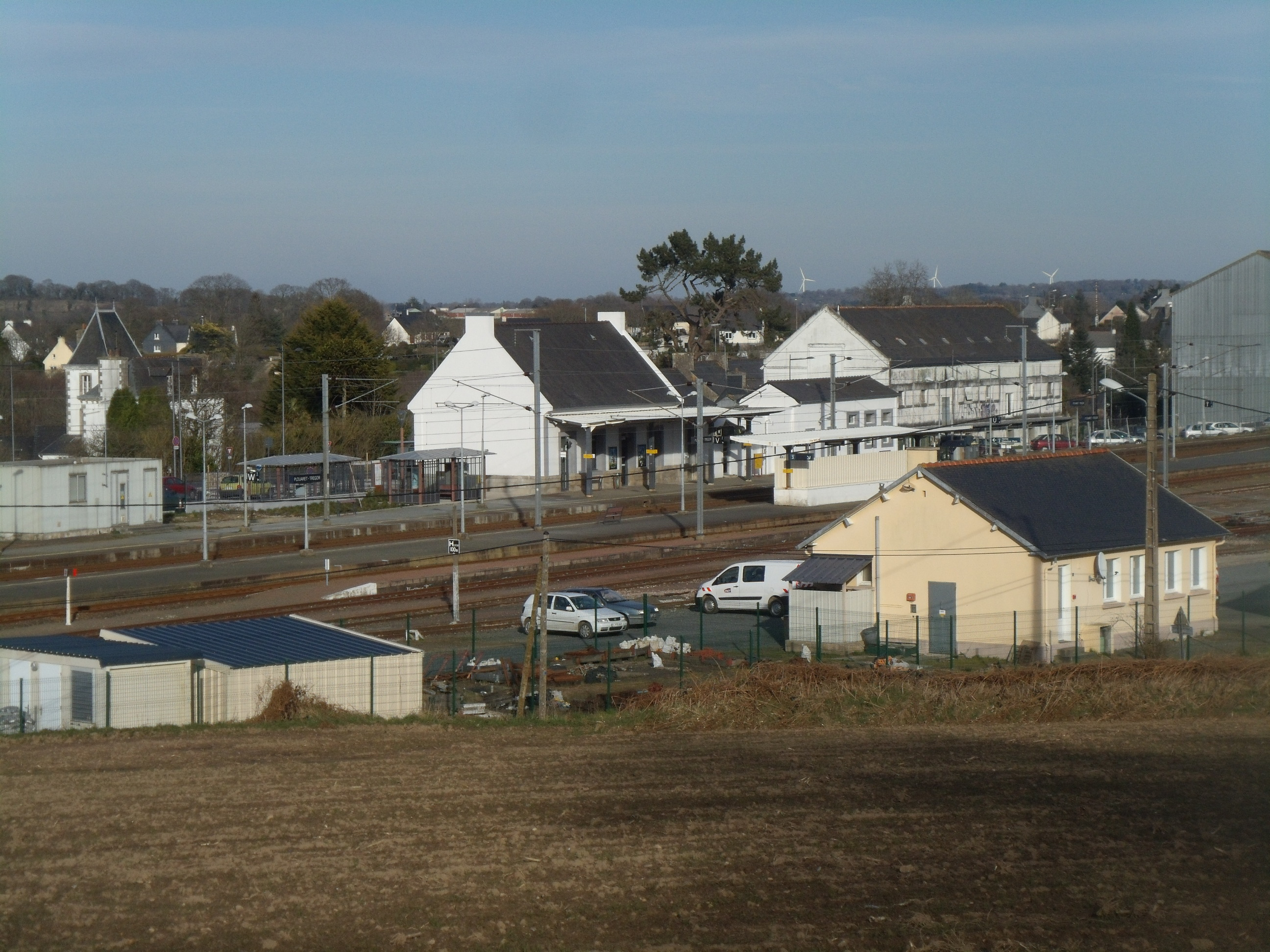
The station, platforms and tracks

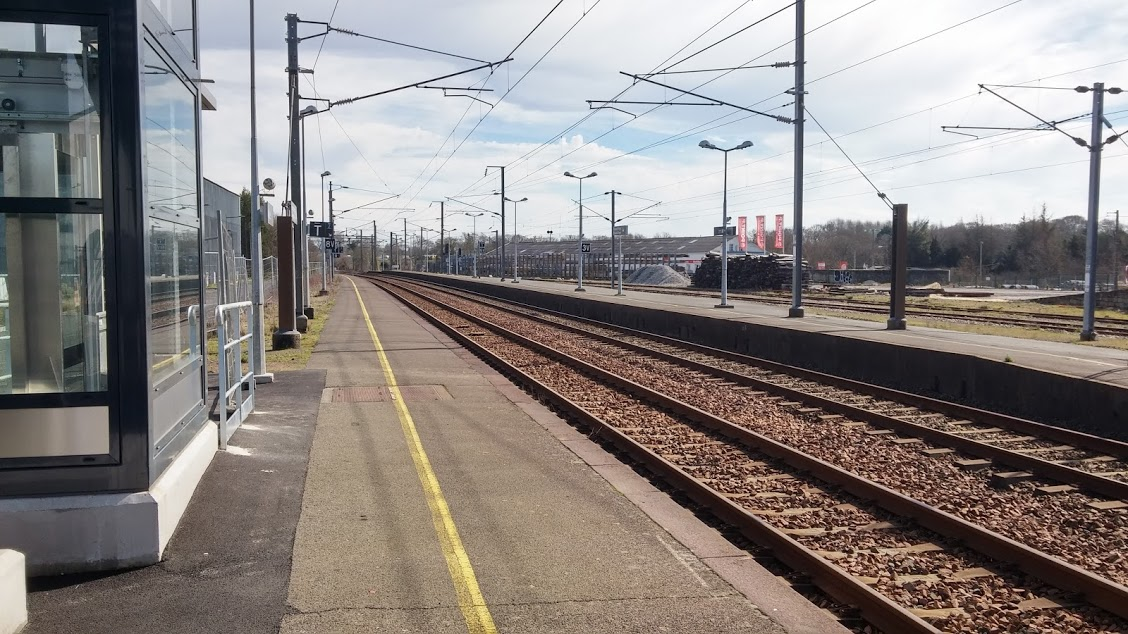
Plouaget-Tregor Railway Station, Brittany France. Looking East

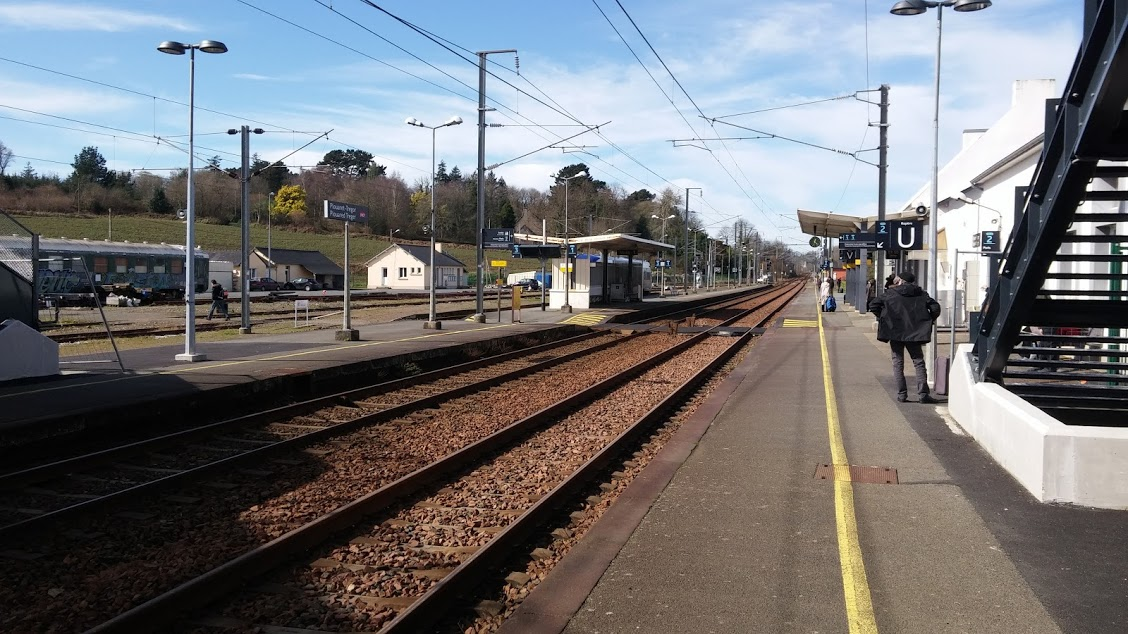
Plouaget-Tregor Railway Station, Brittany France. Looking West

== Services ==
The station is served by high speed trains to Brest, Rennes and Paris, and regional trains to Brest, Lannion, Saint-Brieuc and Rennes.

== See also ==
- List of SNCF stations in Brittany
