= Île de Ré railway line =

Railway line in France

The Île de Ré railway (French: ‘Petit Train de l’Île de Ré) served the island known as the Île de Ré, which lies off La Rochelle, on the west coast of France. The railway ran between Sablanceaux (Rivedoux Plage) and Les Portes en Ré, also serving the main towns of Saint Martin de Ré and Ars en Ré. The line was about 36.5 kilometres (22.7 mi) in length (excluding minor branches to La Flotte and Baleines lighthouse).

== History of the Line ==
The proposal to build a railway on the Île de Ré island was first discussed in 1877 by the Conseil General de la Charente Inferieure, to provide a service for the vineyards and to improve the transport of salt from the ‘salines’ to the ports, although it would be over 20 years before the railway opened. The railway was issued with a declaration of public utility in 1893 and built by the Compagnie de Chemin de Fer Économiques de Charentes during 1896-1898 with a 50 year concession. It was opened on 9 July 1898.

With the introduction of road buses and motor lorries to the island, and with increasing financial difficulties, the train service was reduced from 1929 and ceased in 1934. In 1936, the track was lifted between Sablanceaux and St.Martin.

In 1942, during the World War II occupation, the line from St.Martin to Les Portes was brought back into service and the Sablanceaux to St.Martin section was restored.

The whole line finally closed in June 1947.

== Train Operations ==
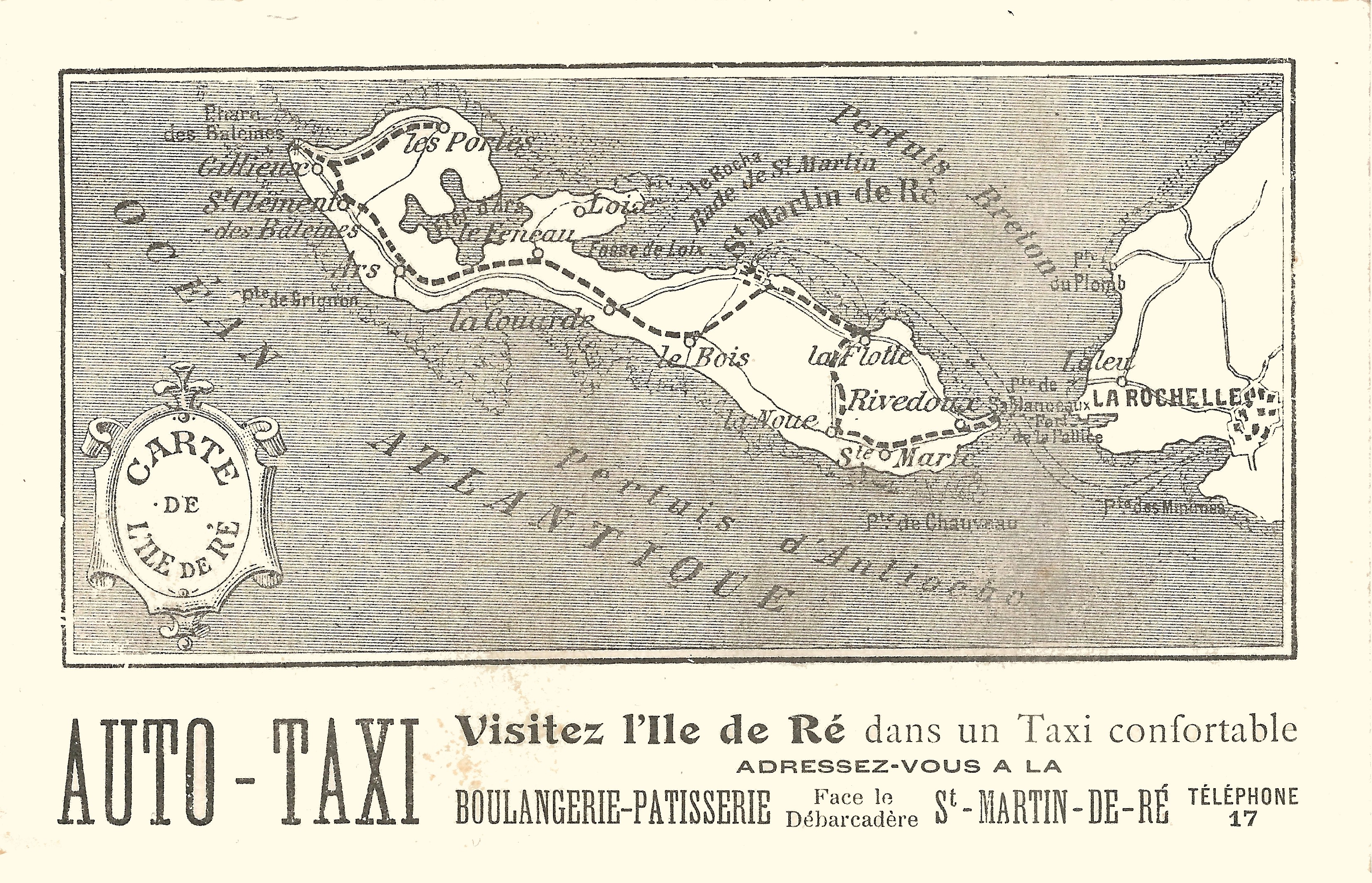
The 1936 taxi map of the island also showed the railway route (as the thick dashed line)

Stations or halts were envisaged at the settlements of Les Portes en Ré, Le Gilleux (halt), Saint-Clément des Baleines, Ars en Ré, Le Martray (halt), Loix (le Feneau), La Couarde, Le Bois, La Noue, La Flotte, Saint Martin de Ré, Sainte-Marie, Rivedoux and Sablanceaux.

The decree of public utility required a minimum of three trains per day over the whole length of the line, however it was reported that at the start of the 20th century, two trains per day completed the return journey.

Trains were limited to a maximum of 8 vehicles or 60m length and a speed of 35 km/h, reduced to 20 km/h on road sections.

A fares table and goods tariff was established for fast and slow trains: passengers (first and second class) and merchandise such as fresh fish and oysters were conveyed by fast train, whereas animals and other goods were conveyed by slow train. A postal service was also included, with the obligation to permit the Post Office to fix mail boxes to a carriage of the train.

== Locomotives and Rolling Stock ==
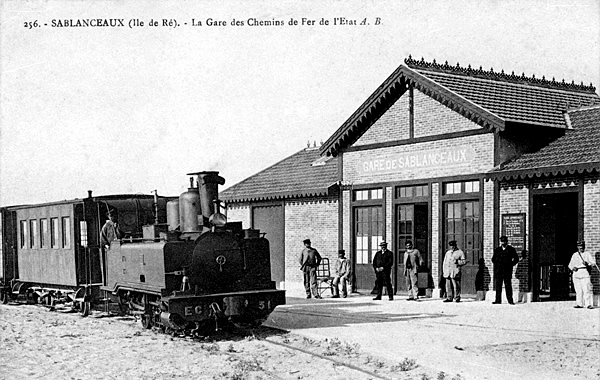
Locomotive EC 31 at Sablanceaux station

At the opening of the line, four locomotives were used, supplemented by a fifth in 1904. There were 11 passenger coaches, of which one provided first class accommodation. Two or three vans were used for baggage, and 24 for merchandise. Rolling stock dimensions were defined as a maximum width of 2.1m and height of 3.5m.

The wartime revival of 1942-1947 used a rail-converted lorry to carry passengers, accompanied by a trailer for goods.

== Infrastructure and stations ==
The metre gauge track was laid was to be laid on ballast, and in some parts of the route, along roads, including the use of the quays of La Flotte and the roads and quays of Saint Martin. The track design for the sharing of the route with road transport was specified, including the construction of suitable road surfaces, rail alignments and clearances for ‘ordinary vehicles’ and pedestrians. Rails were specified with a weight at least 18 kg/m, with timber sleepers of no less than 85cm spacing.

There was no active signalling on the line. In order to improve safety at the entrance to St.Martin, through the Porte Thoiras, a regulation was made that the conductor had to check that the track was clear before the train proceeded.

Stations were intended to follow the character of stations adopted by the tramways of the Dordogne department and each station required a shelter for passengers.

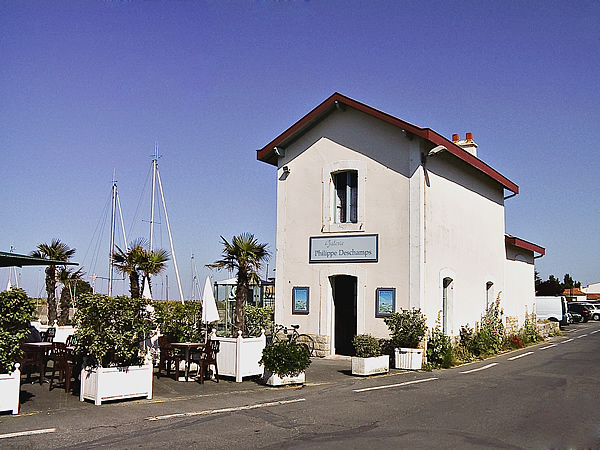
Ars en Ré station building survives as an artist's studio

Sablanceaux was initially provided with a single timber station building, which served as engine shed, office, parcels office, passenger shelter and staff messroom. A new improved station was opened in 1909, providing more comfort for passengers arriving on the island by boat.

At Saint Martin, the headquarters of the line, there was a passenger station, shop, workshops and a weighbridge.

Ars en Ré had a station on the quayside.

Les Portes, at the western end of the line, had a timber locomotive shed, a water supply and turntable.
