= Tournemire - Roquefort to Le Vigan railway line =

Former railway line

Tournemire - Roquefort to Le Vigan

Overview
- Line number: 727 000
- Locale: France
- Termini: Tournemire - Roquefort; Le Vigan

History
- Opened: 1896
- Closed: 1952-1971

Technical
- Line length: 61.780 km (38.388 mi)
- Track gauge: Standard (1435mm)
- Electrification: Non-electrified

The line from Tournemire - Roquefort to Le Vigan is a former standard gauge, single track, railway line in the Aveyron and Gard departments of France. It served the principal stations of Tournemire - Roquefort and Le Vigan.

It was assigned reference number 727 000 in the French national railway network.

== History ==
The line was declared a public utility of general interest (as the second part of the Albi to Le Vigan line) by a law passed on 8 August 1879, following discussions which considered three possible routes across the landscape of high plateaux and deep valleys:

The first option followed the existing railway to Millau, then would use the Dourbie valley through Nant d’Aveyron, then the Arre valley to Le Vigan. This route was strongly advocated by the council in Millau and local businesses, who argued that it would benefit the town of Millau and the important commercial interests in the Dourbie valley, including mines near Treves and the agricultural areas around Nant d’Aveyron, giving them the shortest route to the markets in the south and southeast. However, this route would have been longer for the end-to-end Albi to Le Vigan regional route and more expensive than the second option.

The second option used the Cernon valley from Tournemire to reach the Larzac plateau, then through Sauclieres to the Arre valley. This presented the lowest cost and shortest route between Albi and Le Vigan, although it included steep gradients, required many bridges and tunnels, and would only serve areas of low population.

The third and most southerly option would follow the Sorgue valley, then the Vis valley via Alzon. This route was rejected without further discussion, on the basis of cost and additional route length.

The Cernon valley route was eventually selected, on the basis that this route minimised the length and cost of the legally required route between Albi and Le Vigan. It was considered that the Dourbie valley route would add distance and cost to the whole route which could not be justified.

A concession was awarded to the Compagnie des Chemins de Fer du Midi by a law of 20 November 1883. The line entered service on 24 August 1896, operated by the same company.

When the main French railway companies were nationalised on 1 January 1938, the Société Nationale des Chemins de Fer Français (SNCF) took over the line.

The line was closed to passenger traffic in 1939 and to goods traffic in several later stages:

- 1952: from L'Hospitalet-du-Larzac to Avèze - Molières.
- 1960: from Tournemire - Roquefort to L'Hospitalet-du-Larzac.
- 1971: from Avèze - Molières to Le Vigan.

It was formally declassified on the following dates:

- L'Hospitalet-du-Larzac to Avèze - Molières (PK 543,900 to 583,270): 12 November 1954.
- Tournemire - Roquefort to Hospitalet-du-Larzac (PK 525,225 à 543,900): 29 October 1970.
- Avèze - Molières to Le Vigan (PK 583,270 à 585,983): 14 January 1972.

At the end of the 1970s, the section from Tournemire - Roquefort to l'Hospitalet was refurbished by the army as part of the extension of the Larzac military camp. The abandonment of the extension of this camp in 1981 ended any hope of seeing any traffic on the line again.

== Vélorail du Larzac ==
In 1999, an original idea was realised to use the track laid by the 5th Engineers to run a ‘vélorail’ system between Sainte-Eulalie-de-Cernon and Le Rouquet stations, over almost 5 km. In 2001 the activity began on the first part of the route and was named the ‘papillon’ (butterfly) route. Since then, with the renovation of the Sainte-Eulalie-de-Cernon (2003) and La Bastide-Pradines (2009) stations, the route has been lengthened and runs from the Pradé Tunnel to Le Rouquet over 16 km.

Vélorails share the route with a shuttle train, or with the Larzac-Express tourist train.

== Walking and Cycling Route 'Greenway' (Voie Verte) ==
A walking and cycling trail ('voie verte') known as the viaduct trail ('la promenade du viaduc') has been developed over a 3.5 km section from Cavaillac-Arre to Molières-Avèze.

== Infrastructure ==
The line had a very difficult gradient profile, with gradients up to 33‰. The radius of the curves was limited to 300 m. The line includes many tunnels.
