= Plouaret =

Plouaret Plouared
- Commune
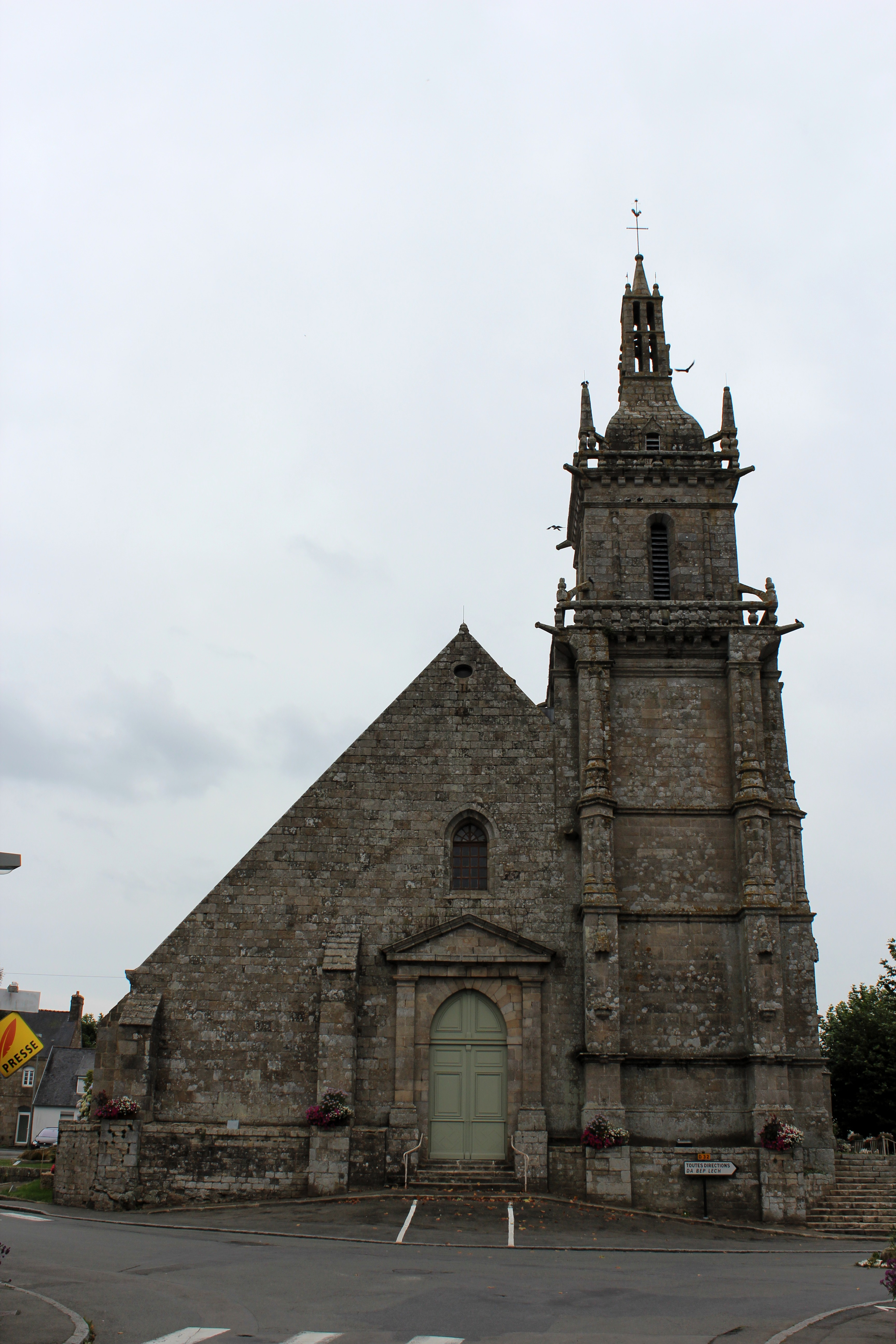
- The church of Notre-Dame

- Coat of arms
- Location of Plouaret
- Location within France Location within Brittany
- Coordinates: 48°36′45″N 3°28′16″W
- Country: France
- Region: Brittany
- Department: Côtes-d'Armor
- Arrondissement: Lannion
- Canton: Plestin-les-Grèves
- Intercommunality: Lannion-Trégor Communauté

Government
  - Mayor (2020–2026): Annie Bras-Denis
- Area^{1}: 29.98 km^{2} (11.58 sq mi)
- Highest elevation: 190 m (620 ft)
- Lowest elevation: 84 m (276 ft)
- Population (2023): 2,237
  - Density: 74.62/km^{2} (193.3/sq mi)
- Time zone: UTC+01:00 (CET)
  - Summer (DST): UTC+02:00 (CEST)
- INSEE/Postal code: 22207 /22420
- ^{1} French Land Register data, which excludes lakes, ponds, glaciers > 1 km^{2} (0.386 sq mi or 247 acres) and river estuaries.

Plouaret (French pronunciation: [pluaʁɛt]; Breton: Plouared) is a commune in the Côtes-d'Armor department of Brittany in northwestern France. Plouaret-Trégor station has rail connections to Brest, Rennes, Lannion, Guingamp and Paris.

== Population ==
Inhabitants of Plouaret are called plouarétais in French.

Historical population
Year	Pop.	±% p.a.
1968	2,196	—
1975	2,134	−0.41%
1982	2,239	+0.69%
1990	2,099	−0.80%
1999	2,109	+0.05%
2007	2,230	+0.70%
2012	2,179	−0.46%
2017	2,139	−0.37%
2023	2,237	+0.75%
Source: INSEE

== Breton language ==
The municipality launched a linguistic plan through Ya d'ar brezhoneg on 12 April 2007.

== See also ==
- Gare de Plouaret-Trégor
- Communes of the Côtes-d'Armor department
