= Collonges-Fort-l'Écluse – Divonne-les-Bains line =

Collonges-Fort-l'Écluse – Divonne-les-Bains
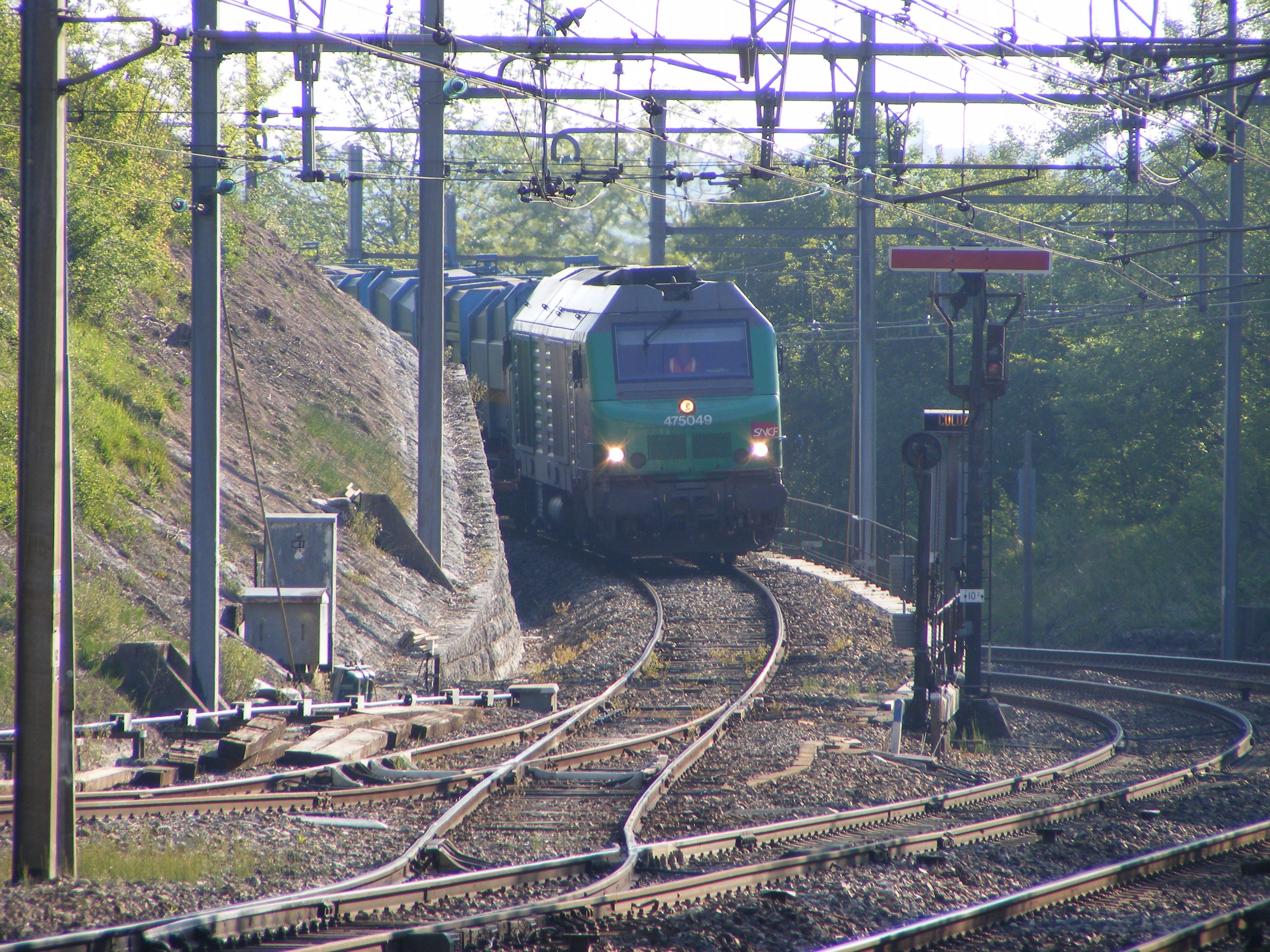
- Start of the line seen from Collonges - Fort l'Ecluse. The daily waste disposal train is approaching from the Chevry terminus.

Overview
- Owner: RFF
- Locale: France (Auvergne-Rhône-Alpes)
- Termini: Collonges-Fort l'Ecluse jct; Divonne-les-Bains

Service
- Type: freight
- System: SNCF
- Operator(s): SNCF

History
- Opened: 1899

Technical
- Line length: 38 km (24 mi)
- Number of tracks: Single track
- Track gauge: 1,435 mm (4 ft 8 1/2 in) standard gauge

The Collonges-Fort-l'Écluse – Divonne-les-Bains railway is a disused French railway line linking the Lyon-Geneva Railway from a junction near Collonges to Divonne-les-Bains. It crosses the whole of the region called the 'Pays de Gex' and is 38 km long. It used to continue through to Nyon in Switzerland.

It is line number 891 000 of the French rail network.

== History ==
The line was opened on 1 June 1899, and extended to Nyon in Switzerland in 1904. In the sixties, there were four services per day using 'Picasso' diesel railcars. The last passenger train ran on 31 May 1980. Since then, the passenger service has been replaced by a TER bus service from Bellegarde-sur-Valserine to Divonne-les-Bains. The only traffic on the line until 2014 is a twice-weekly household waste train from Chevry to the SIDEFAGE incinerator south of Bellegarde-sur-Valserine. Motive power for these trains was initially BB 67000 class diesel locomotives, but today they have been replaced by BB 75000s. Beyond Gex, the bridge over the Route nationale 5 has been dismantled, limiting traffic to Gex. The line is not operable beyond Chevry.

Use of the line for tourist trains has been mooted in the past. In May 2009, an association for the promotion of rail services in the Pays de Gex was formed to promote the inclusion of the line into the future Rhône Express Regional. There have been plans to reactivate the line for passenger traffic and to integrate it into the Geneva suburban rail system.

On April 28, 2014, it was announced that the line was to close for good.

Although the Nyon-Divonne line was private, it was operated by CFF until 1962. The service was replaced by a bus thereafter.

== Gallery ==
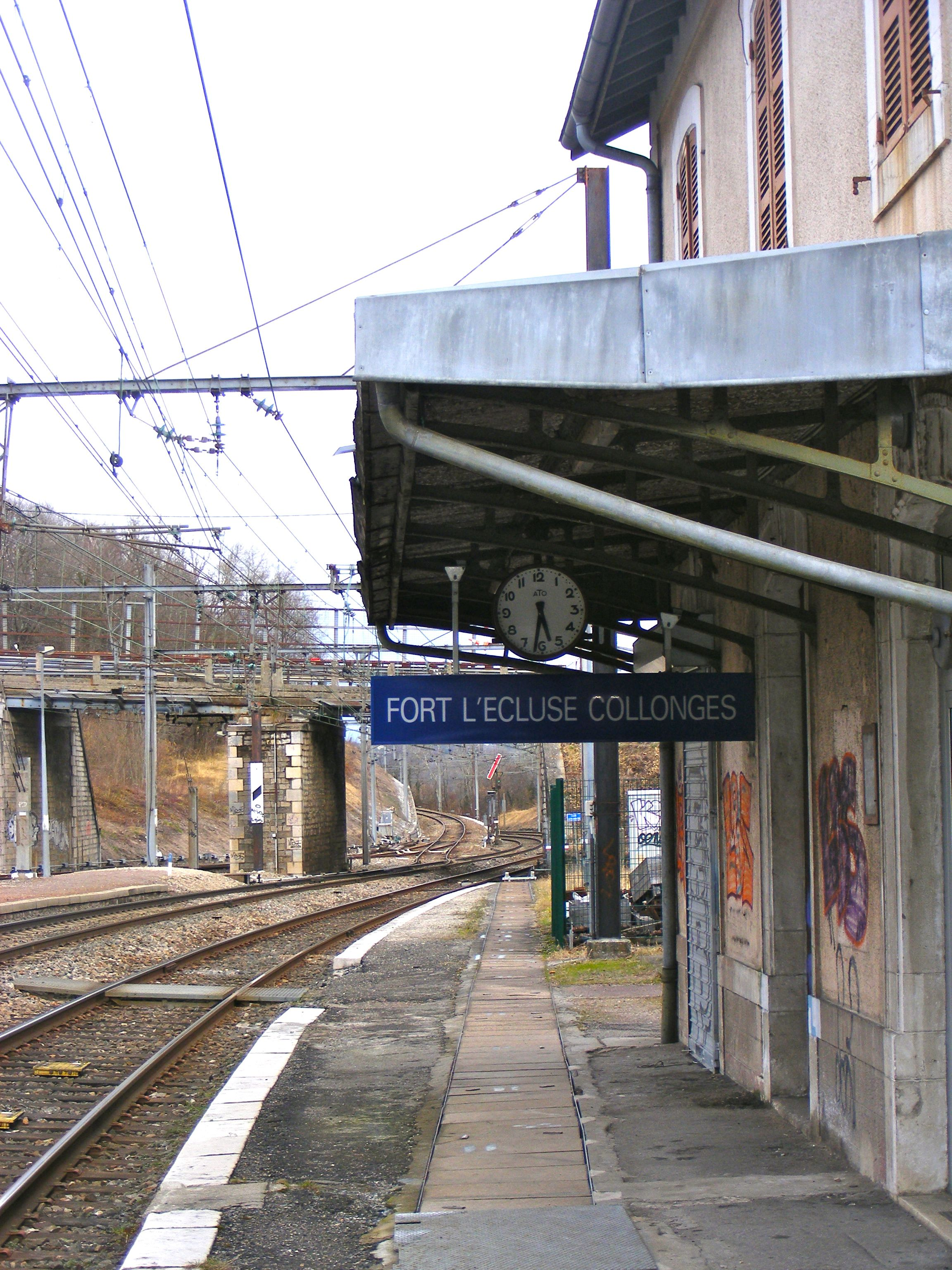
Collonges - Fort l'Ecluse station, in 2011 disused as a station but staffed as a junction.

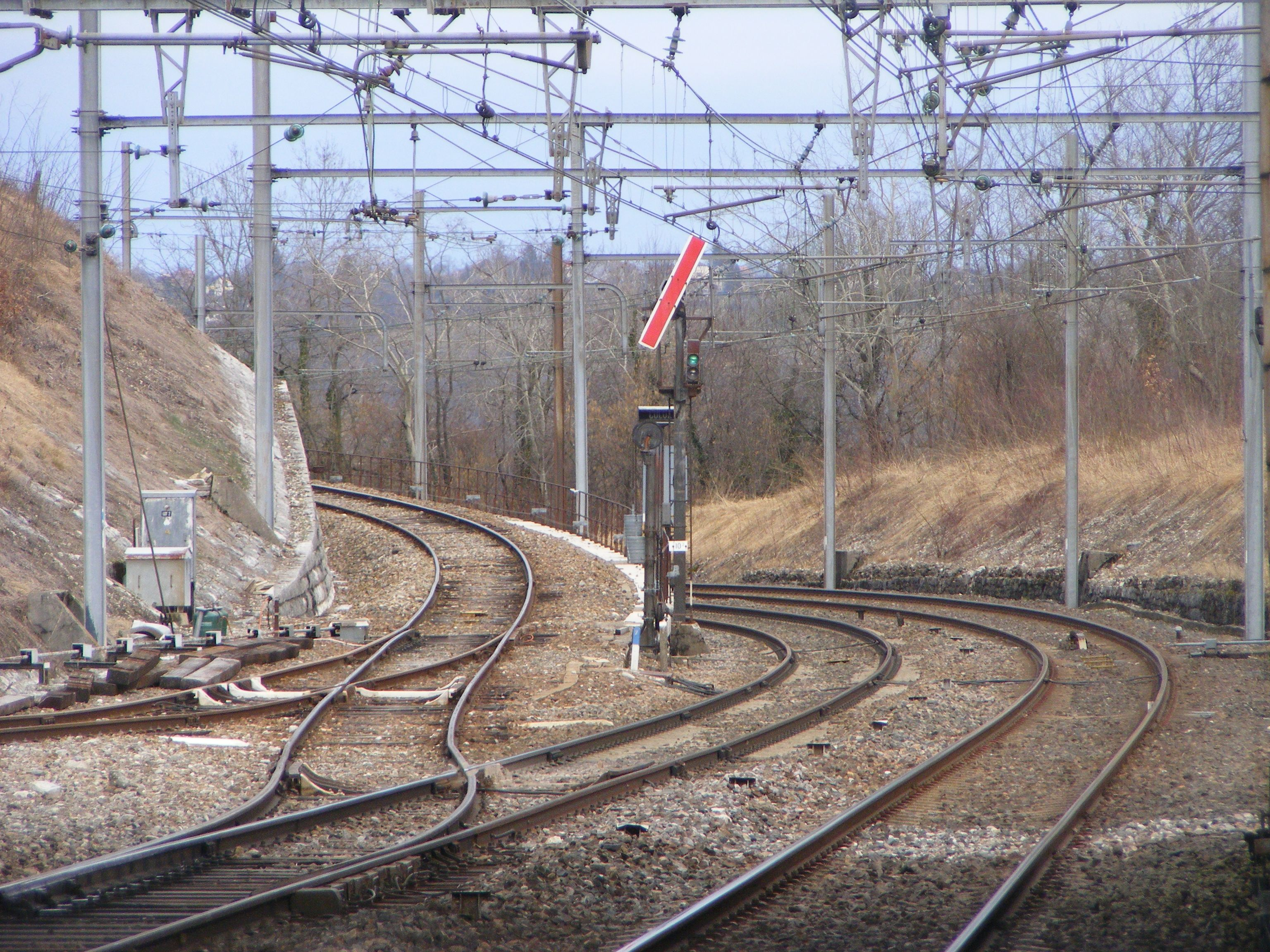
To the left, the line to Divonne can be seen climbing steeply away from the main line.

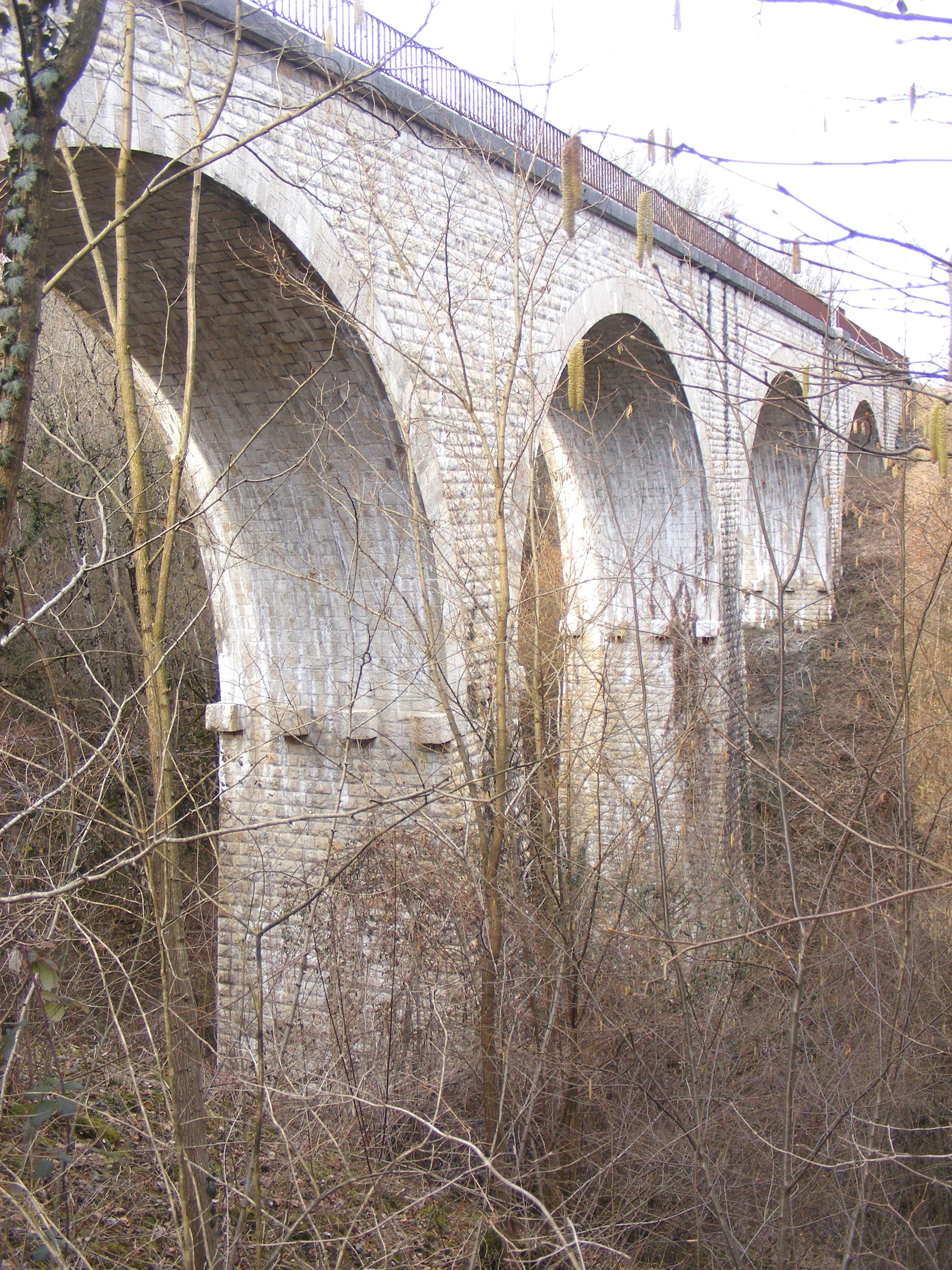
Shortly afterwards the line crosses the Viaduc d'Almogne.

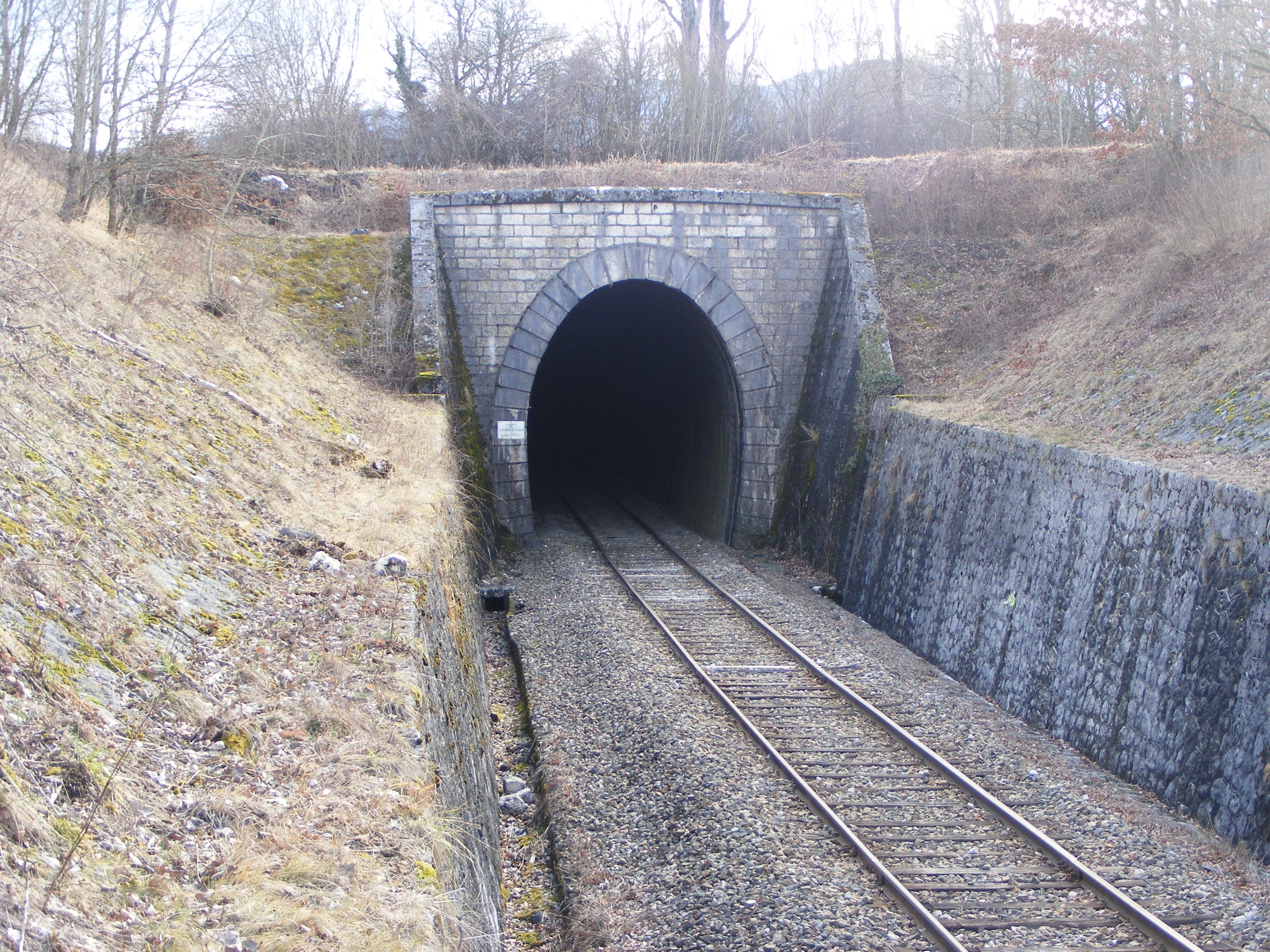
After a further steep climb through the Tunnel du Grand Echaud (northern portal shown here),

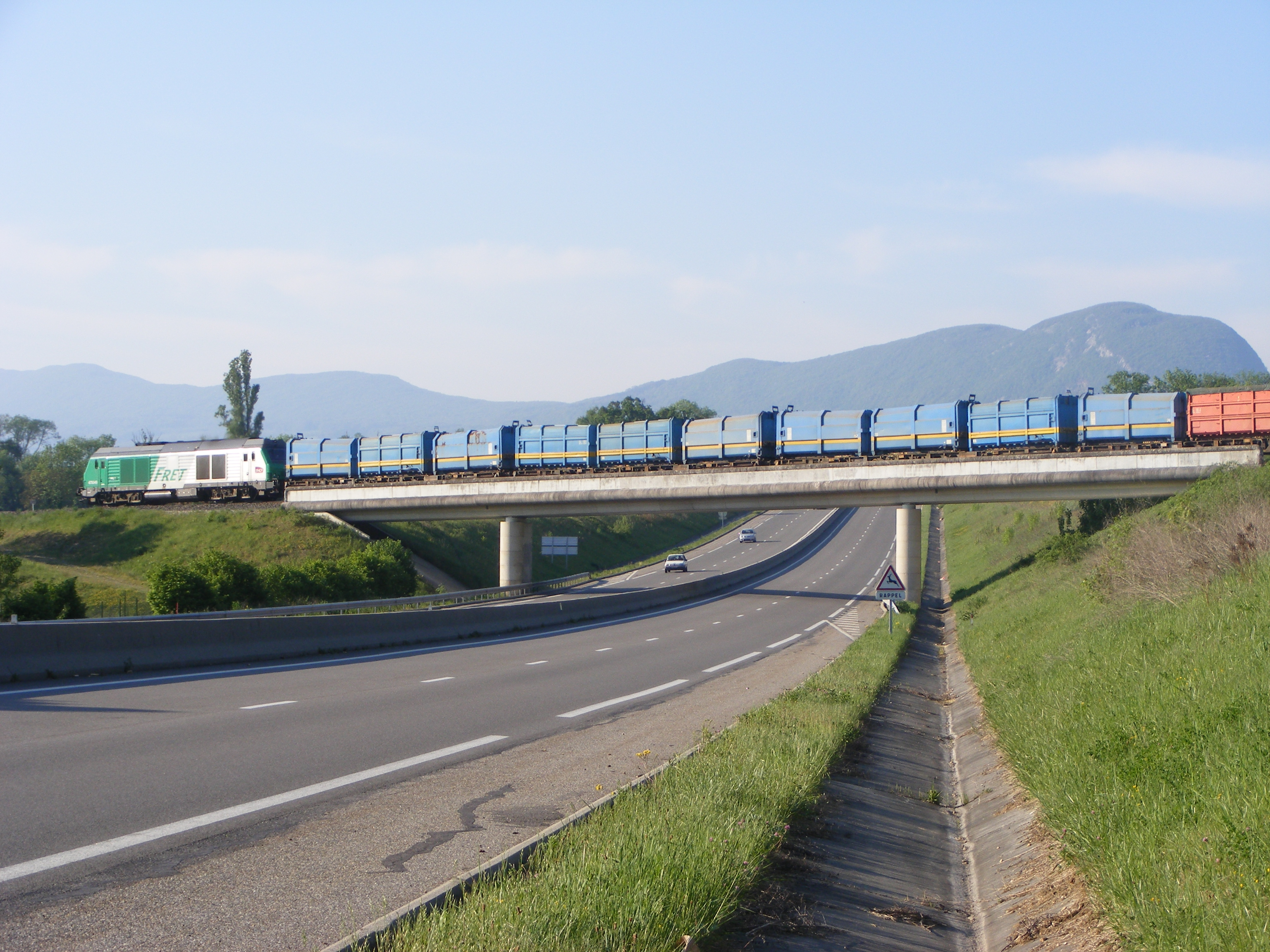
crosses the RD884 near Farges (the daily municipal waste train is seen, heading for Bellegarde)

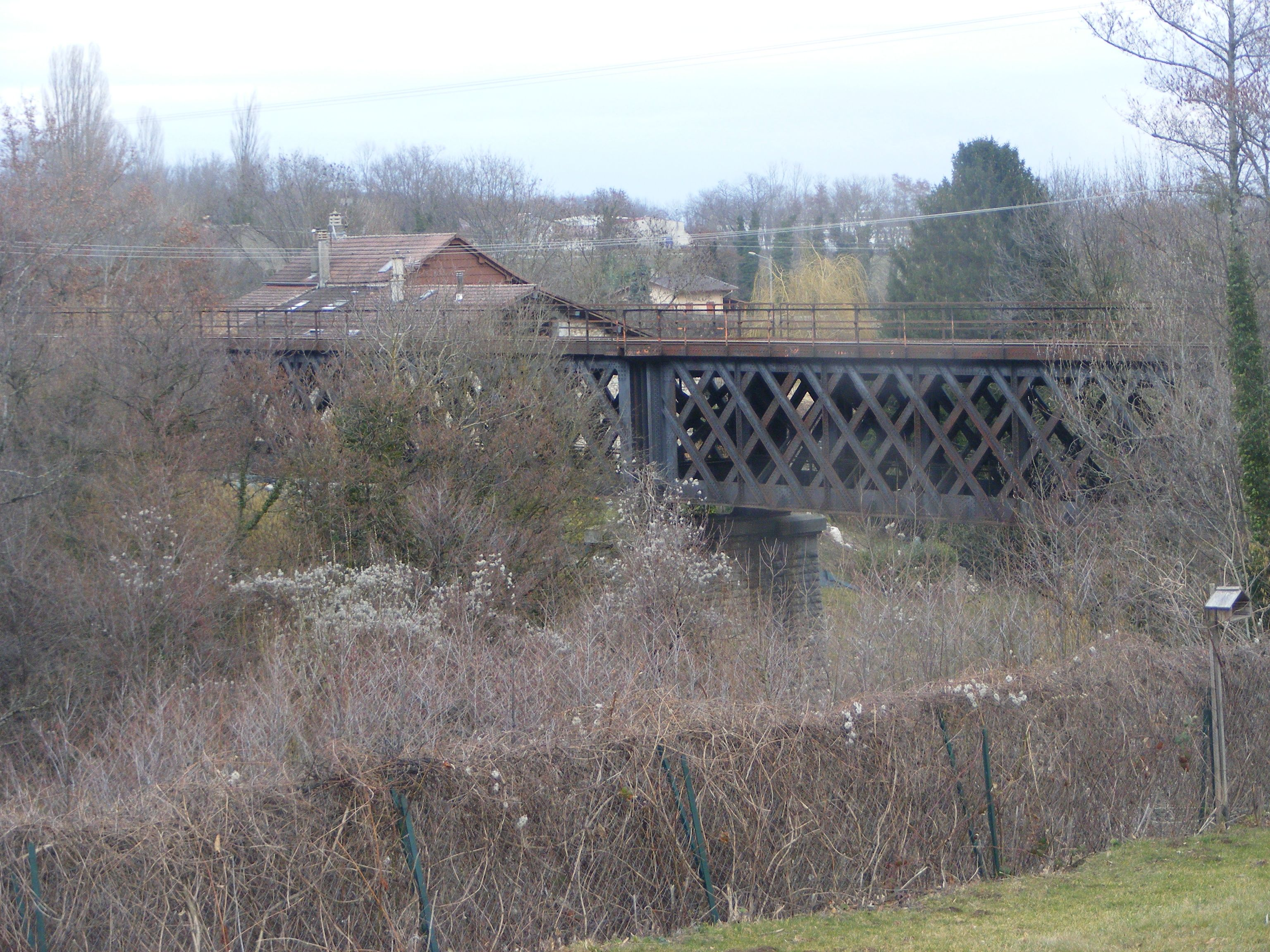
then the line levels out and crosses the Pont de l'Anna in the village of Péron.

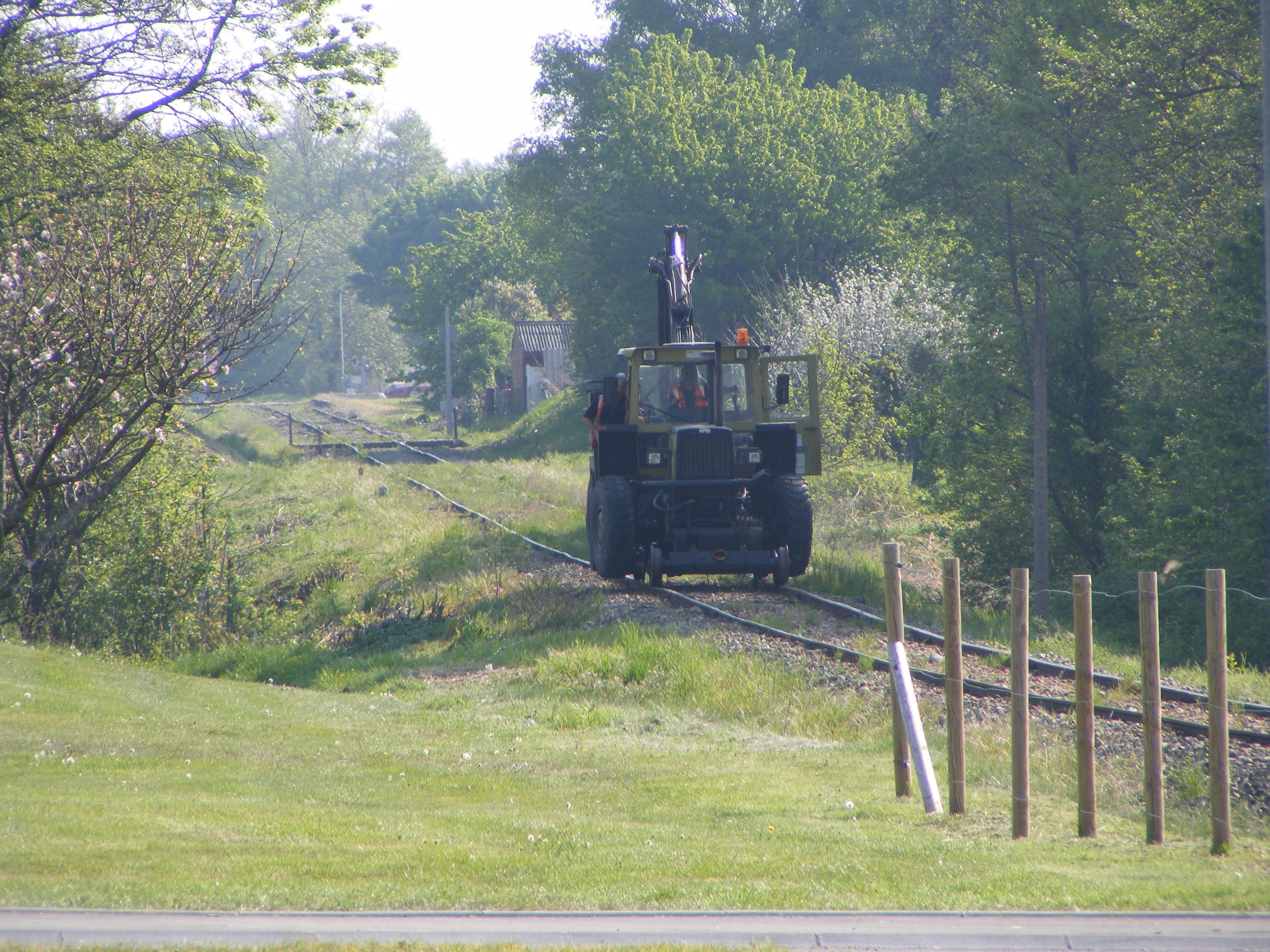
Road/rail hedge trimmers are used to control the trackside vegetation (seen near Péron)

== Bibliography ==
- Indicateur CHAIX summer 1967, page 563
- Connaissances du Rail no. 119, December 1990
