= Château de la Roche (disambiguation) =

Château de La Roche may refer to:

- Château de la Roche, a ruined castle situated in the commune of Bellefosse in the Bas-Rhin département in Alsace, France
- Château de la Roche (Annesse-et-Beaulieu), a château in Dordogne, Aquitane, France
- Château de La Roche (Saint-Priest-la-Roche), a chateau in the commune of Saint-Priest-la-Roche, Loire

== See also ==
- Château de la Roche Courbon
- Château de la Roche-Jagu fortified house near Ploezal in Brittany, France
- Château de la Rochepot
- Chateau Laroche, Loveland, Ohio
