= Château de la Roche-Jagu =

Fortified house in Brittany, France

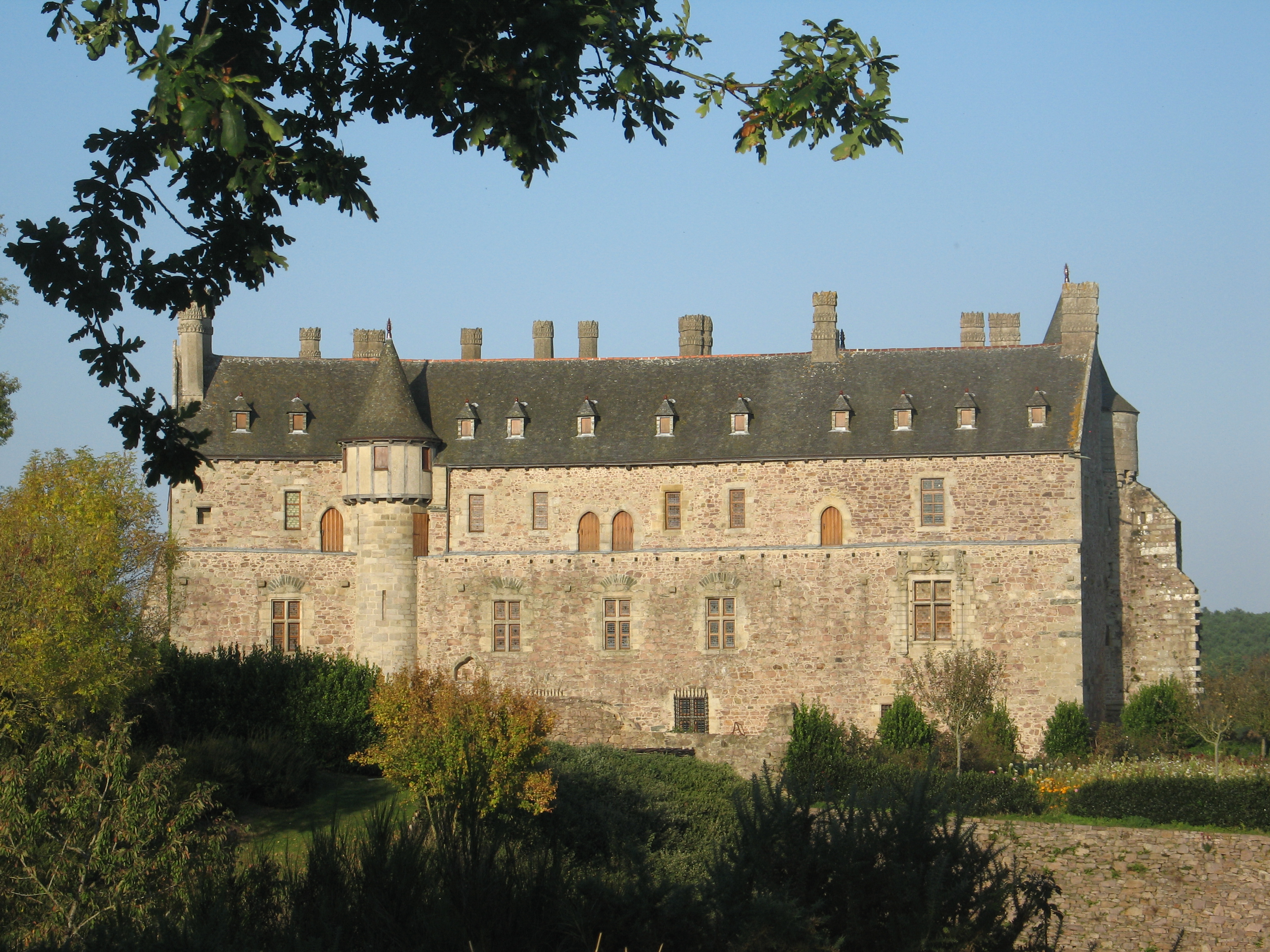
- Frontage to the Château
- Interactive map of the Château de la Roche-Jagu area

General information
- Type: Fortified house
- Location: Ploezal, Côtes-d'Armor, Brittany, France., near Pontrieux
- Coordinates: 48.7332°N 3.1513°W
- Current tenants: Council of the department of the Côtes-d'Armor
- Construction started: early !5th century
- Estimated completion: 1418
- Renovated: 1968

Website
- Château de la Roche-Jagu - in French

The Château de la Roche-Jagu is a 15th-century fortified house located in the commune of Ploëzal in the Côtes-d'Armor, Brittany, France. Since 1958, it has been owned and managed by the Council of the department of the Côtes-d'Armor who restored the château in 1968. Its extensive grounds are managed as a public park and the château itself houses exhibitions, concerts and other public events.

Its situation on a steep promontory on the west bank of the estuary of the Trieux, gives it a commanding view of the surrounding area and in particular of the river which it was historically able to monitor and control movement on.

== The Château ==
The oldest parts of the Château de la Roche-Jagu were built at the end of the Middle Ages. The walkway running along the rear of the building, overlooking the river enabled defence of the house and control of traffic on the river Trieux. The house consists of a single building whose entrance is through a door surmounted by a niche. The first floor still has its stone mullioned windows but the second and higher floors are set back and the roof has been extensively reworked. The ground floor kitchen is the only room kept in its original medieval state.

The château is situated at the top of the steep, westerly bank of the river Trieux and provides an exceptional view on the surroundings and in particular of the river which it formerly controlled all passage and trade on.

The château was classified as an historical monument on June 25, 1930, then the wall, the gate and the pavilions which frame it on January 27, 1969. The château is currently managed by the Departmental Council of Côtes-d'Armor who have owned it since 1958, following the bequest of Viscount Gaetan d'Ales to the State. The Château houses guided visits, themed exhibitions, cultural events and shows. During the summer of 2006, the exhibition concerned Flax, a plant that was long cultivated and made into linen and lace in Brittany. The summer of 2018 saw an exhibition on the odyssey of spices.

== Gardens ==
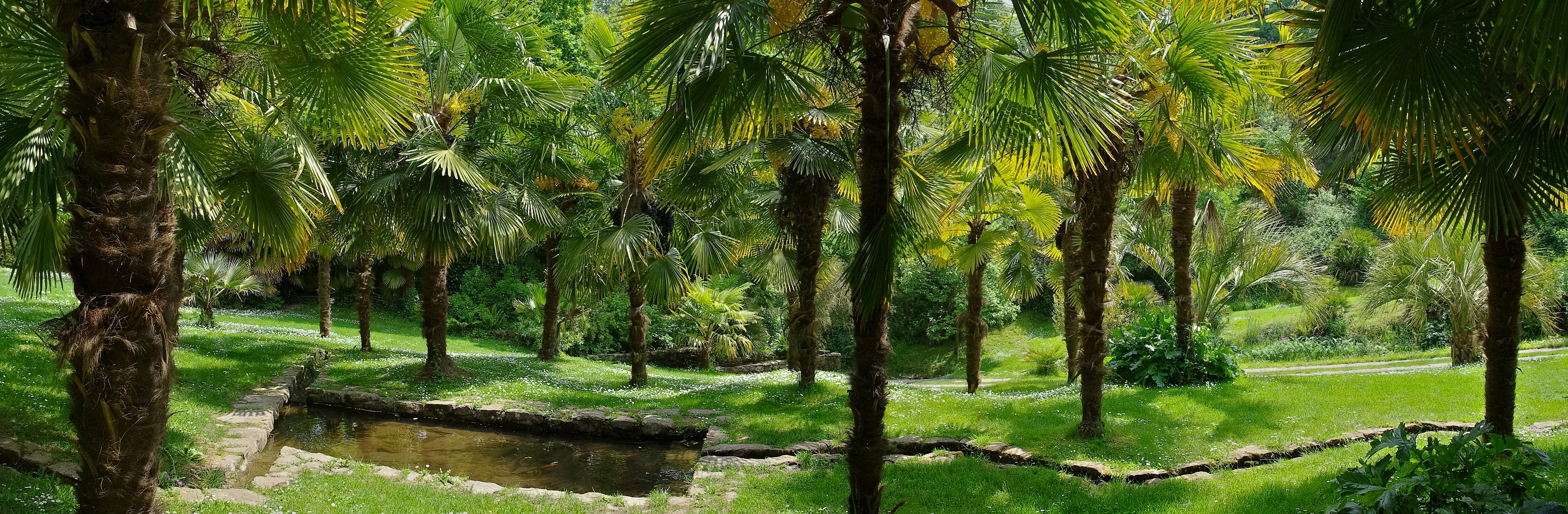
The palm garden in the park

The 30-hectare park and gardens are organised around a 350 year old oak tree in the main courtyard. There are three marked walkways starting from this oak tree each with its own theme: water (the source of the Stanco, the horse basin, the old retting basins), the path of the Orient (palm grove) and the Silver Rock. A promontory offers a panoramic view over the estuary of the Trieux. A forest area, an oak grove, medieval-inspired gardens (vegetable garden, medicinal plant garden, the bouquetier) and a set of 350 varieties of camellias make up the main part of the garden completed by the oaks collection, rose garden and various plants: honeysuckle, jasmine and wisteria as well as vine. The different spaces are delimited by fascines and braided plants.

Wrought iron sculptures, line the paths leading to the promontory and a sculpture by Beatrice Coron, "Voyage Intérieur", is installed in the historical garden.

In 1987, a storm devastated the park, following which the landscape gardener Bertrand Paulet led the restoration.

The park and gardens of la Roche-Jagu are free to visit, and nature workshops are also organised. These contemporary gardens of medieval inspiration were designed by the landscape designer Bertrand Paulet. They have been designated Remarkable Gardens since 2005 and since January 2017, the park has also been designated as an "Écojardin", thus rewarding the ecological management of the site and its respect for biodiversity.

== Gallery ==
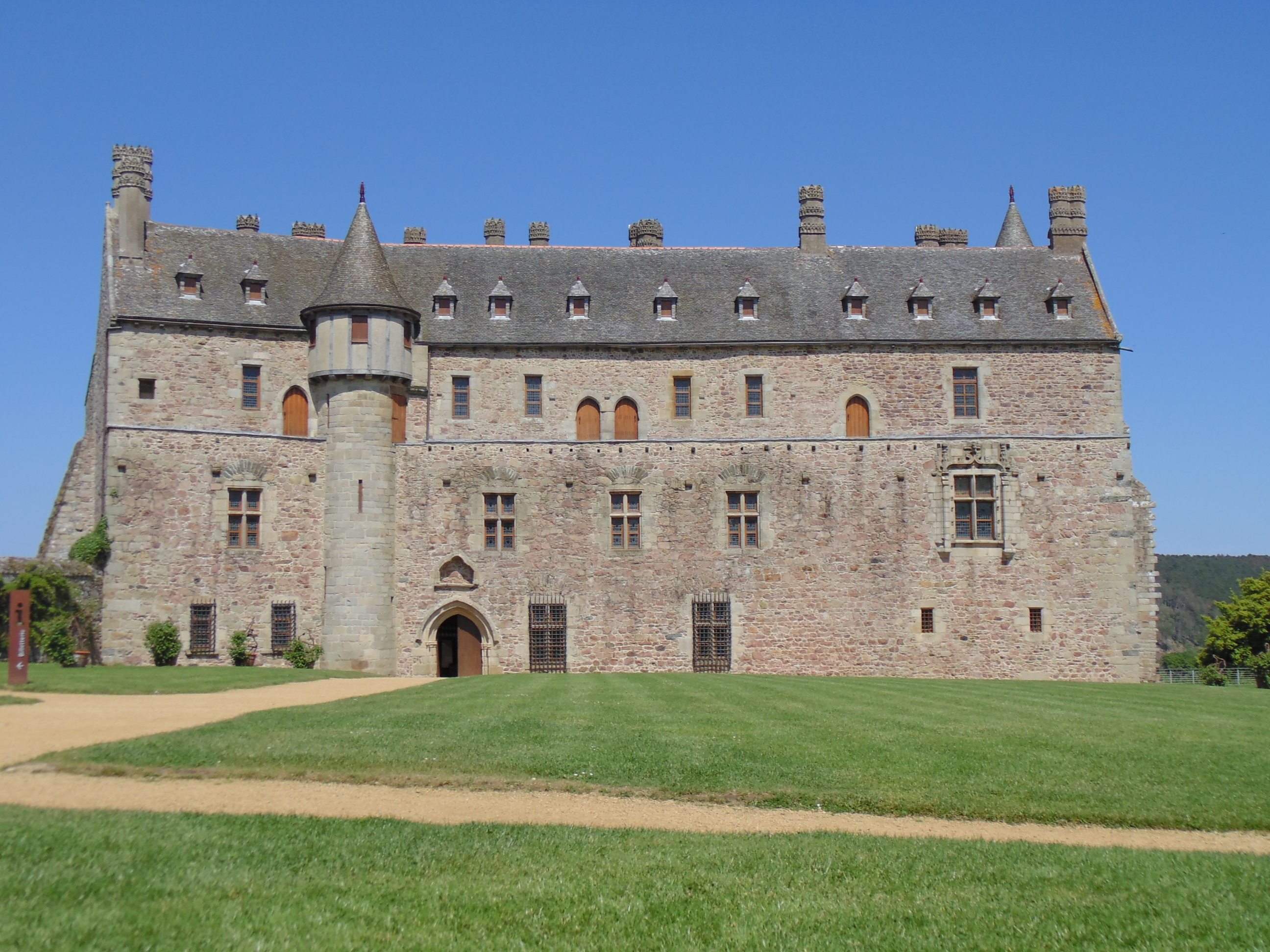
Frontage of the château

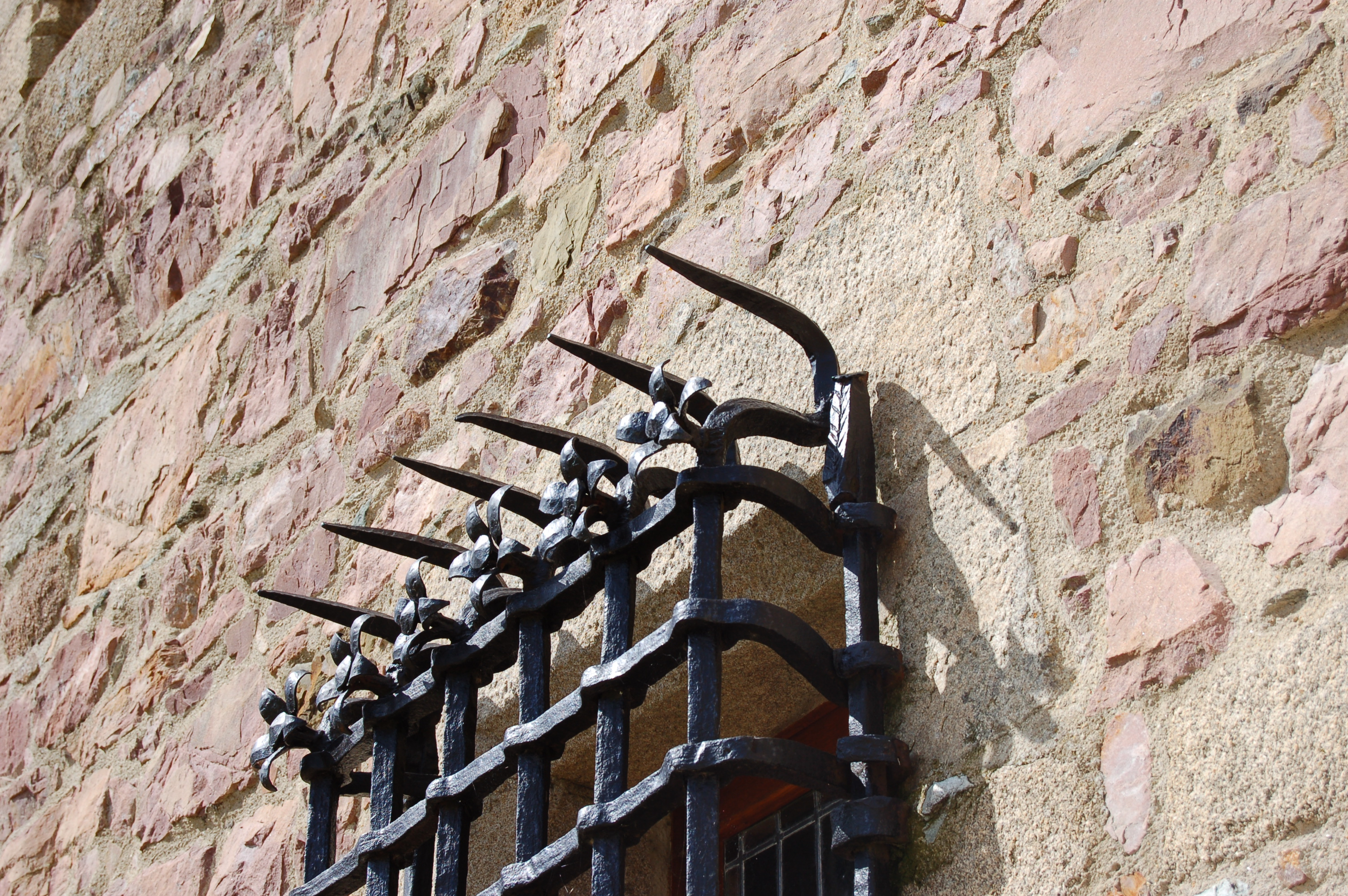
Defensive ironwork

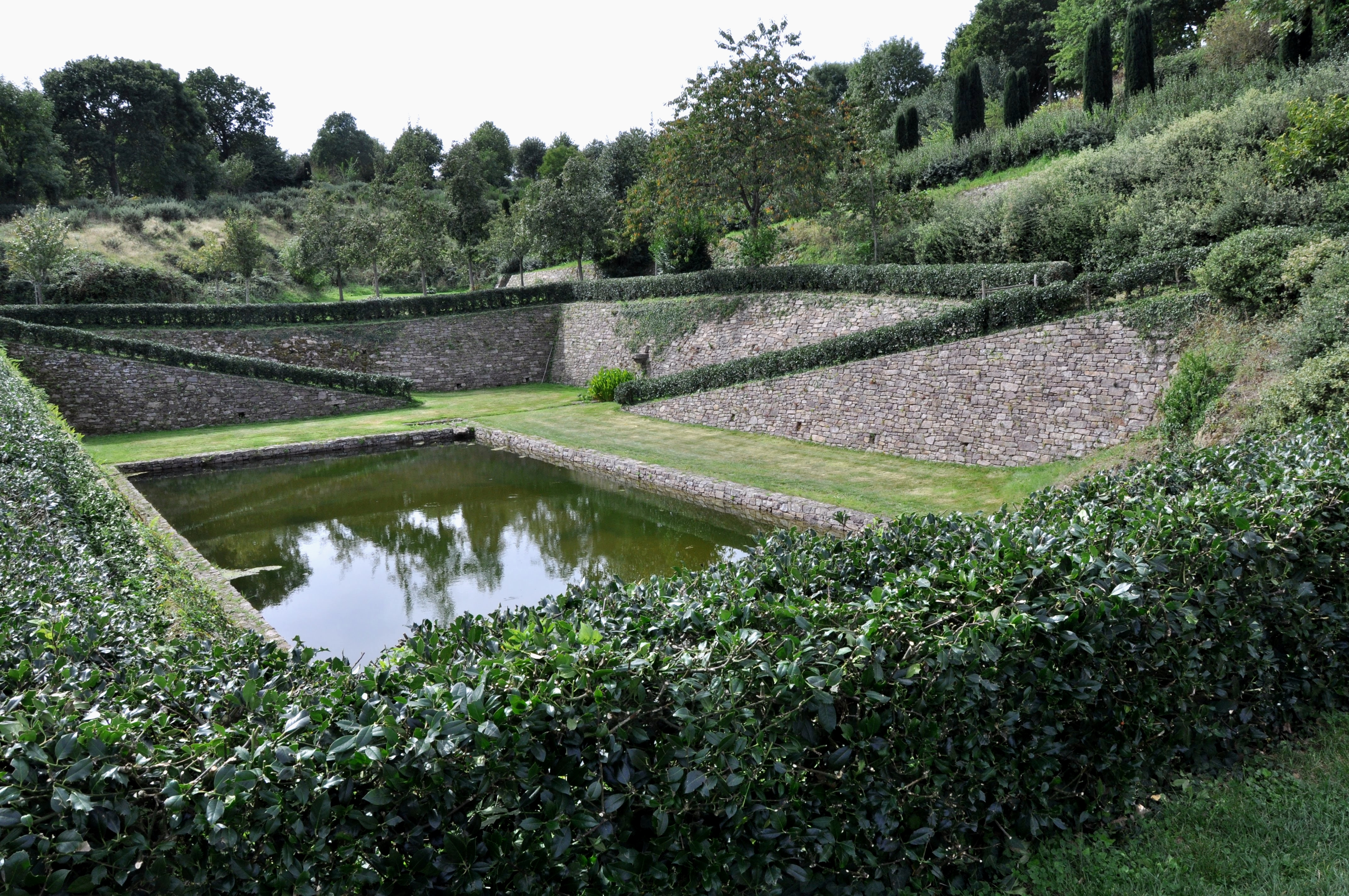
The horse basin

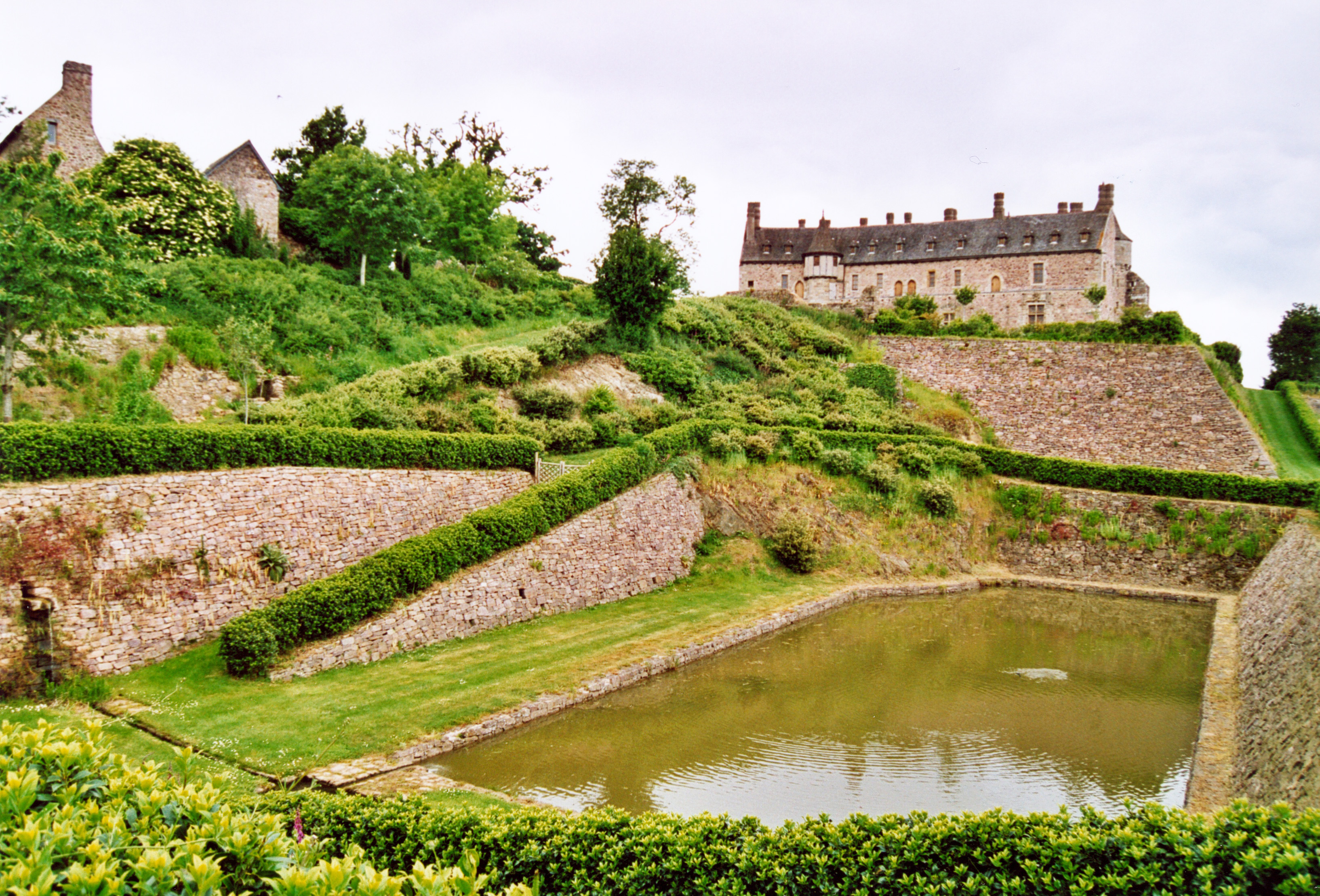
The château seen from the horse basin

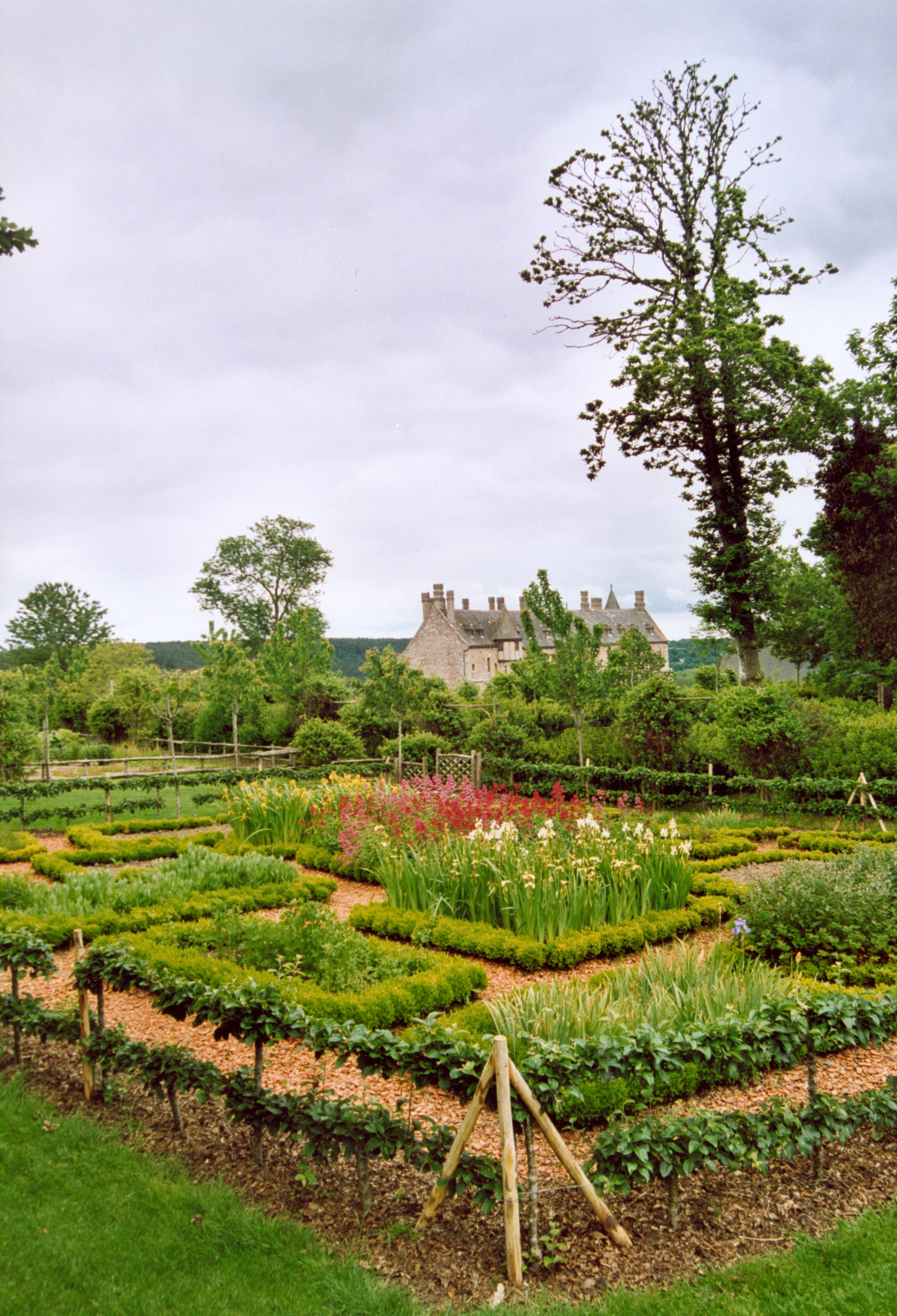
The gardens of the château

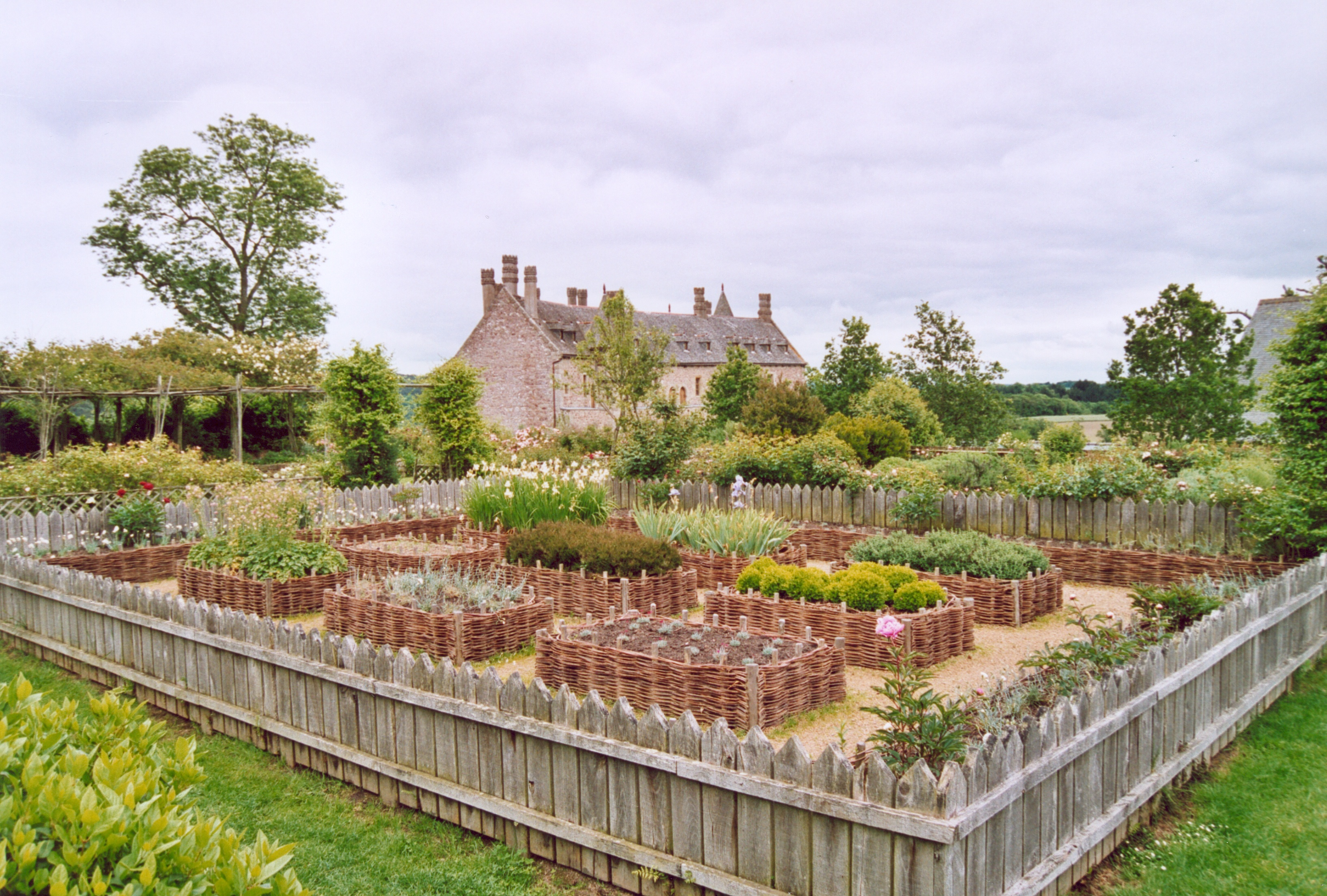
The gardens of the château

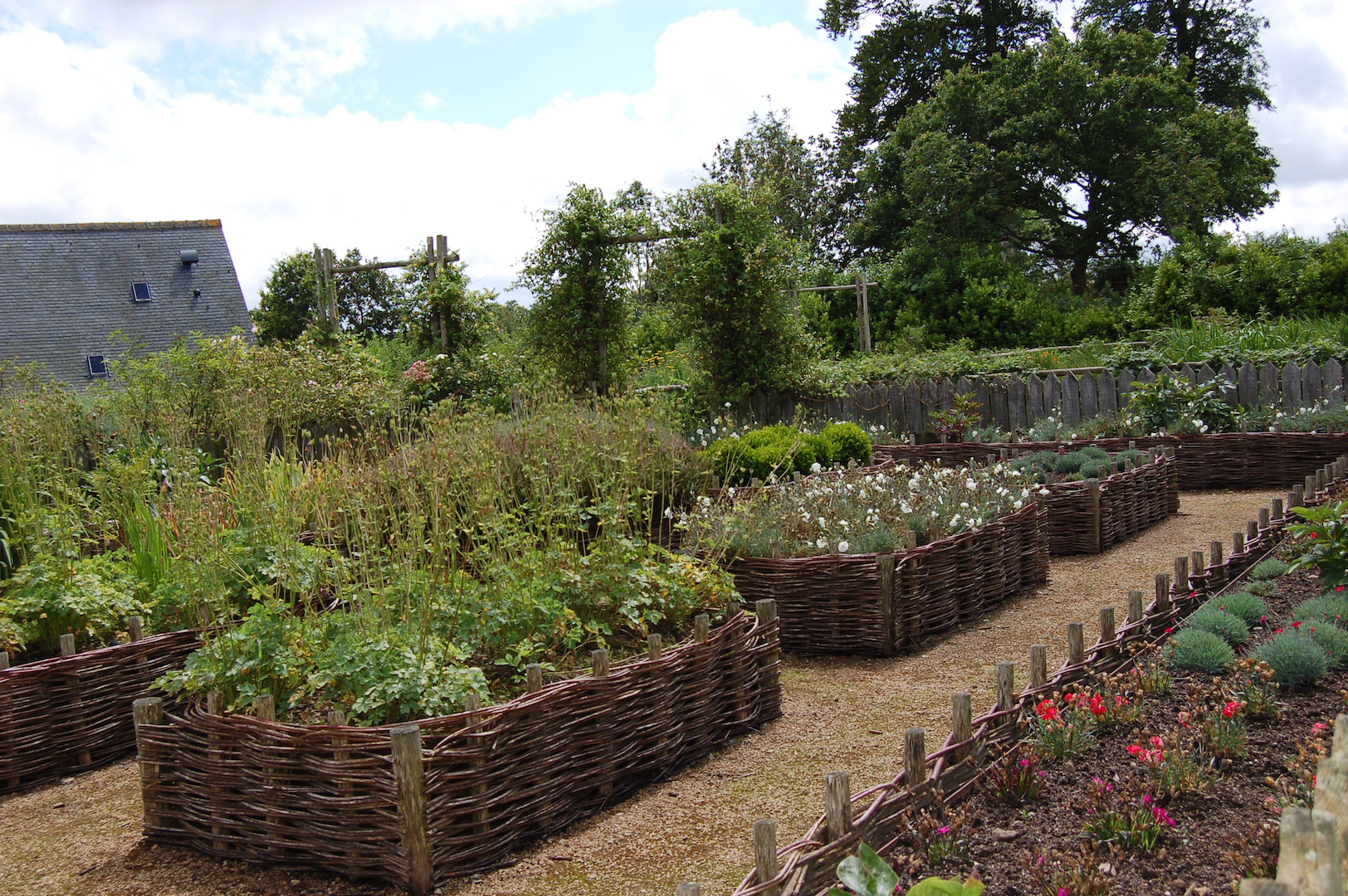
Vegetable garden

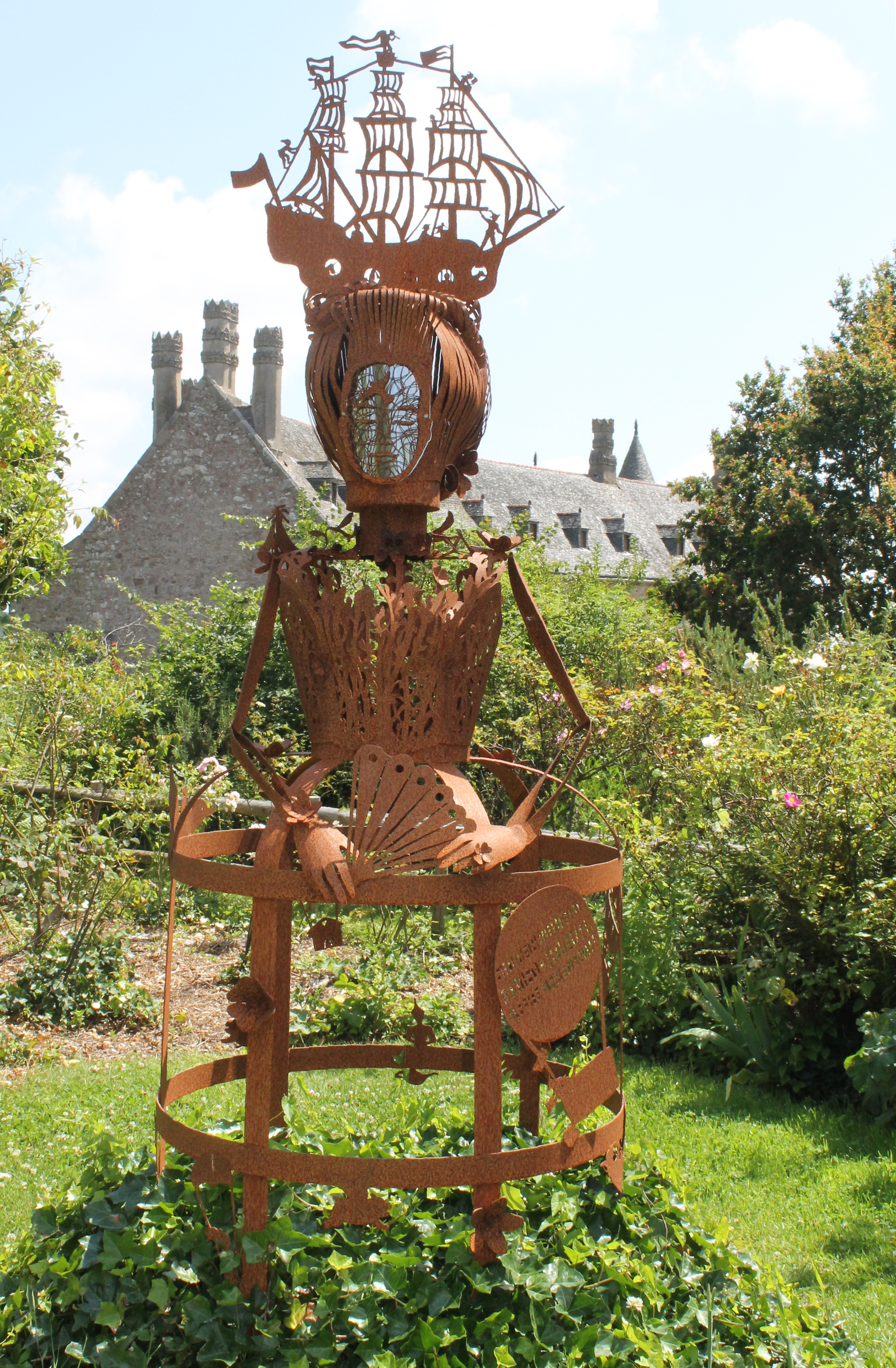
Iron sculpture in the gardens

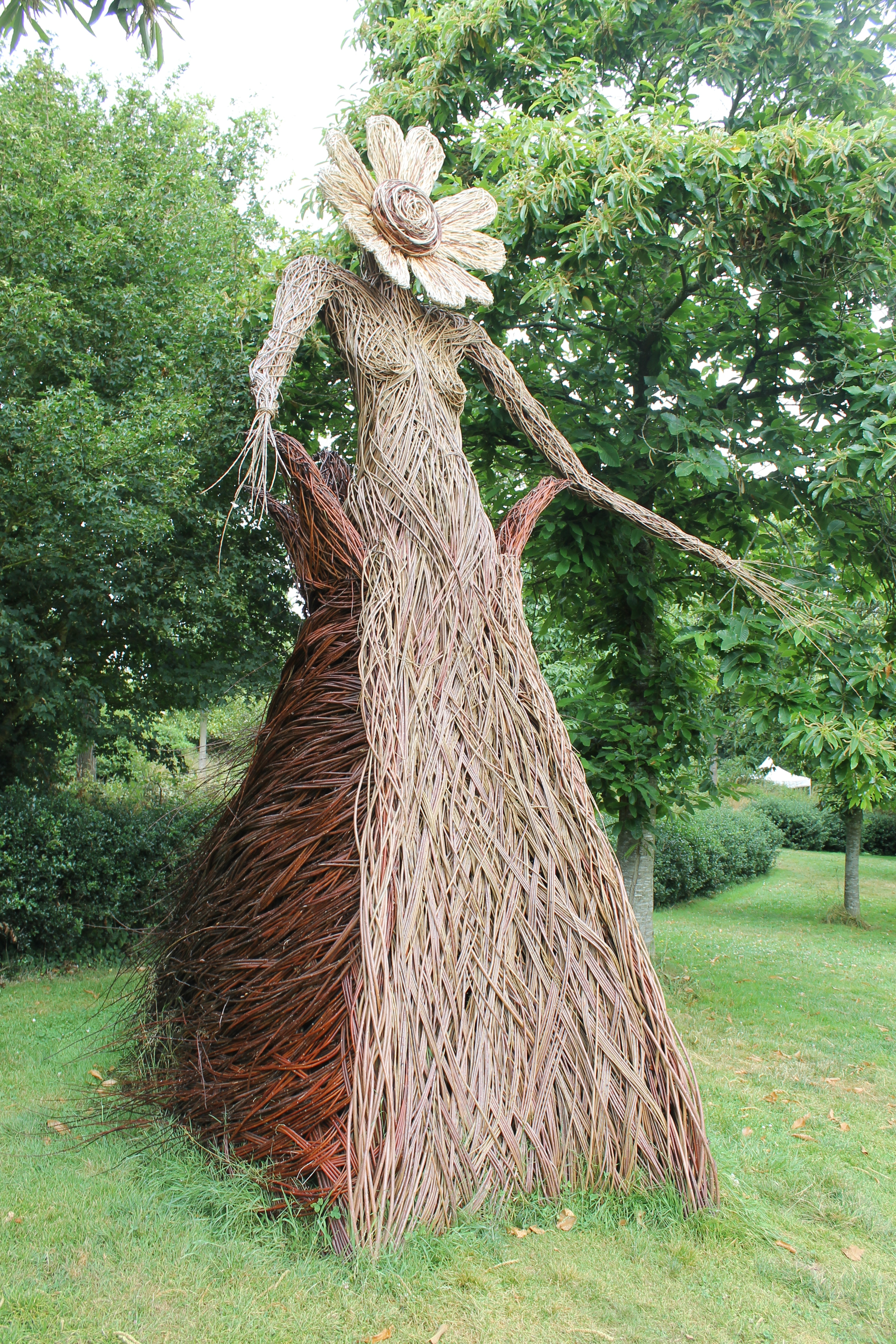
Wickerwork figure of a woman in the grounds

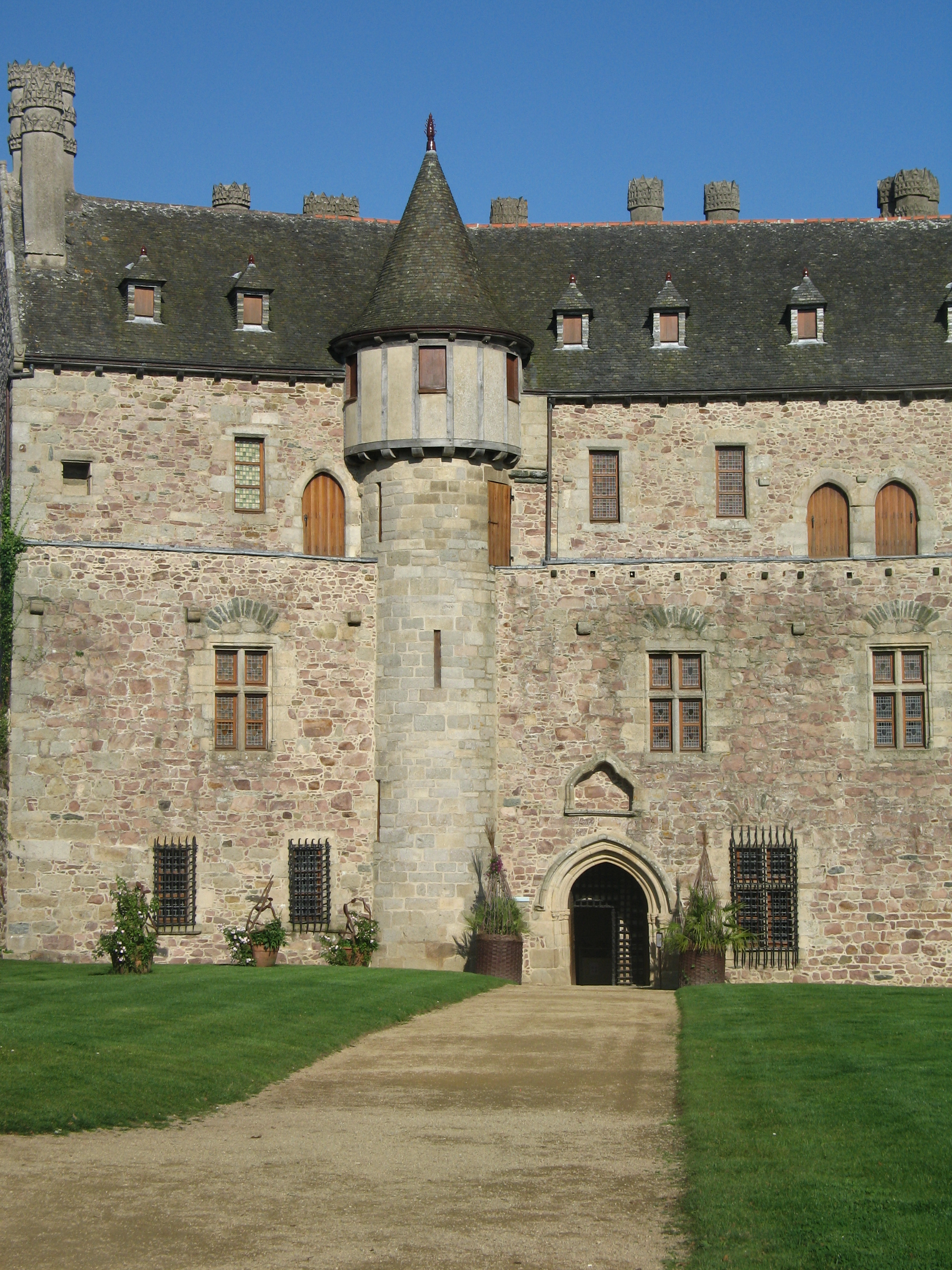
Tower of the château

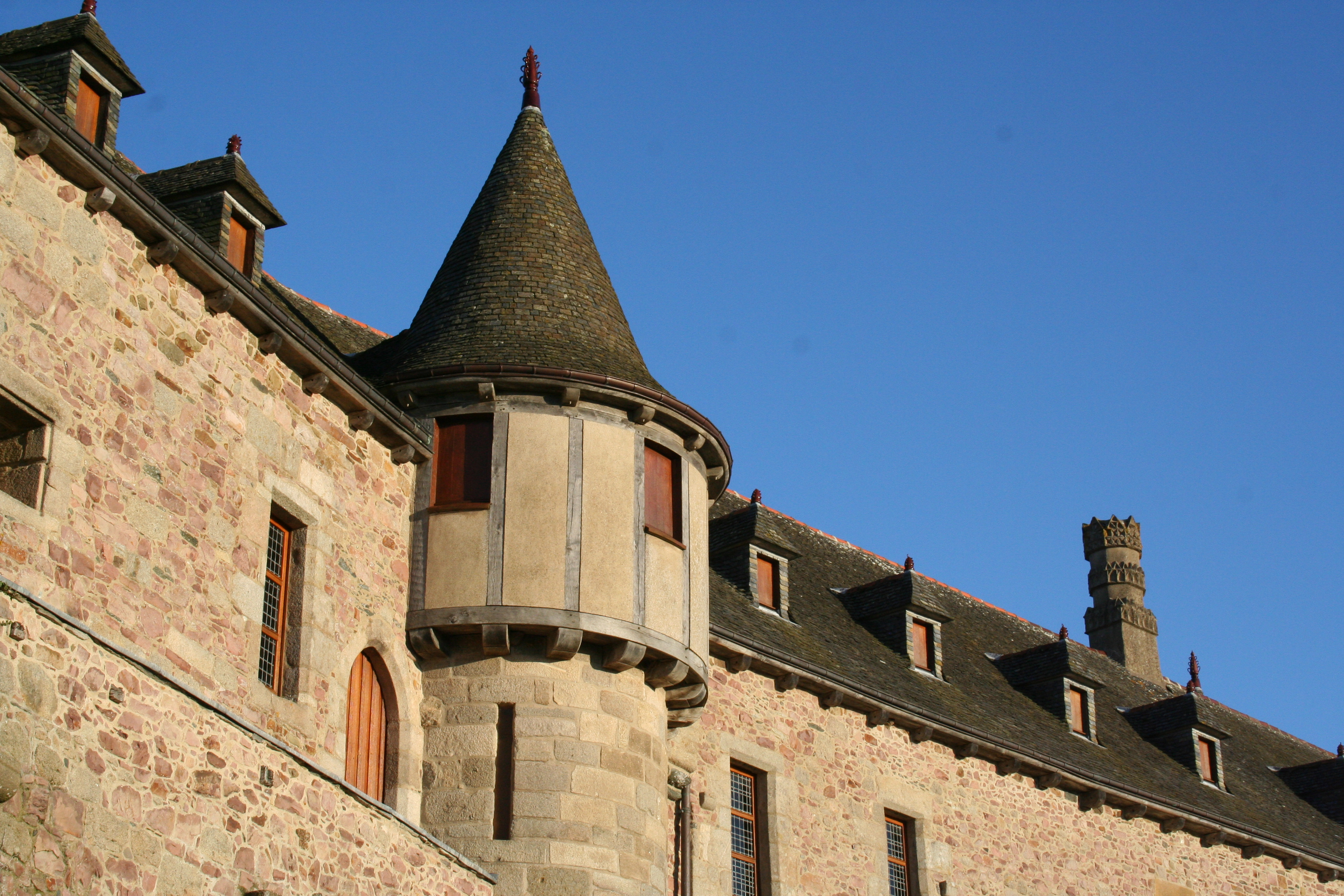
Detail of the tower

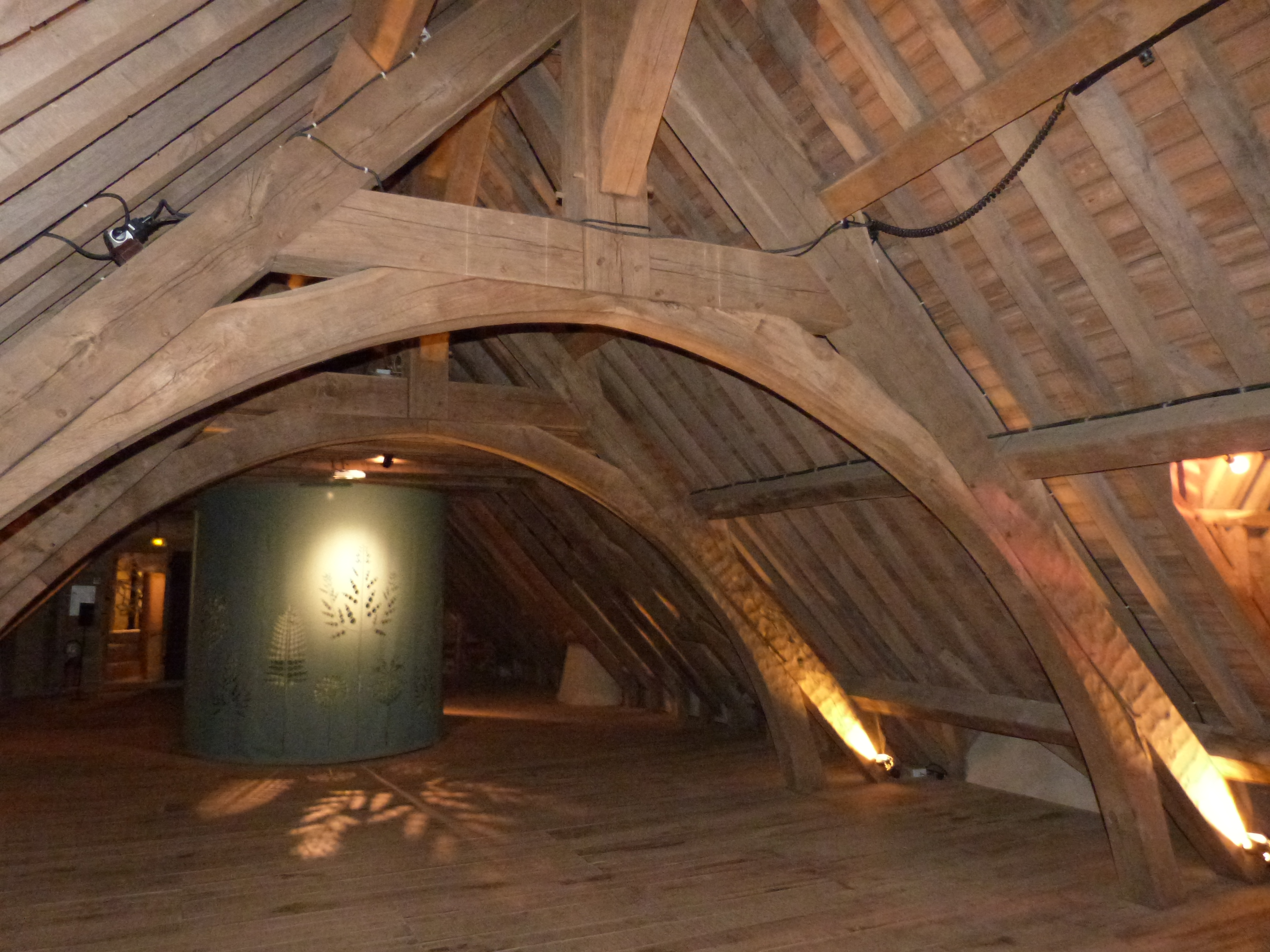
Timberwork in the attic

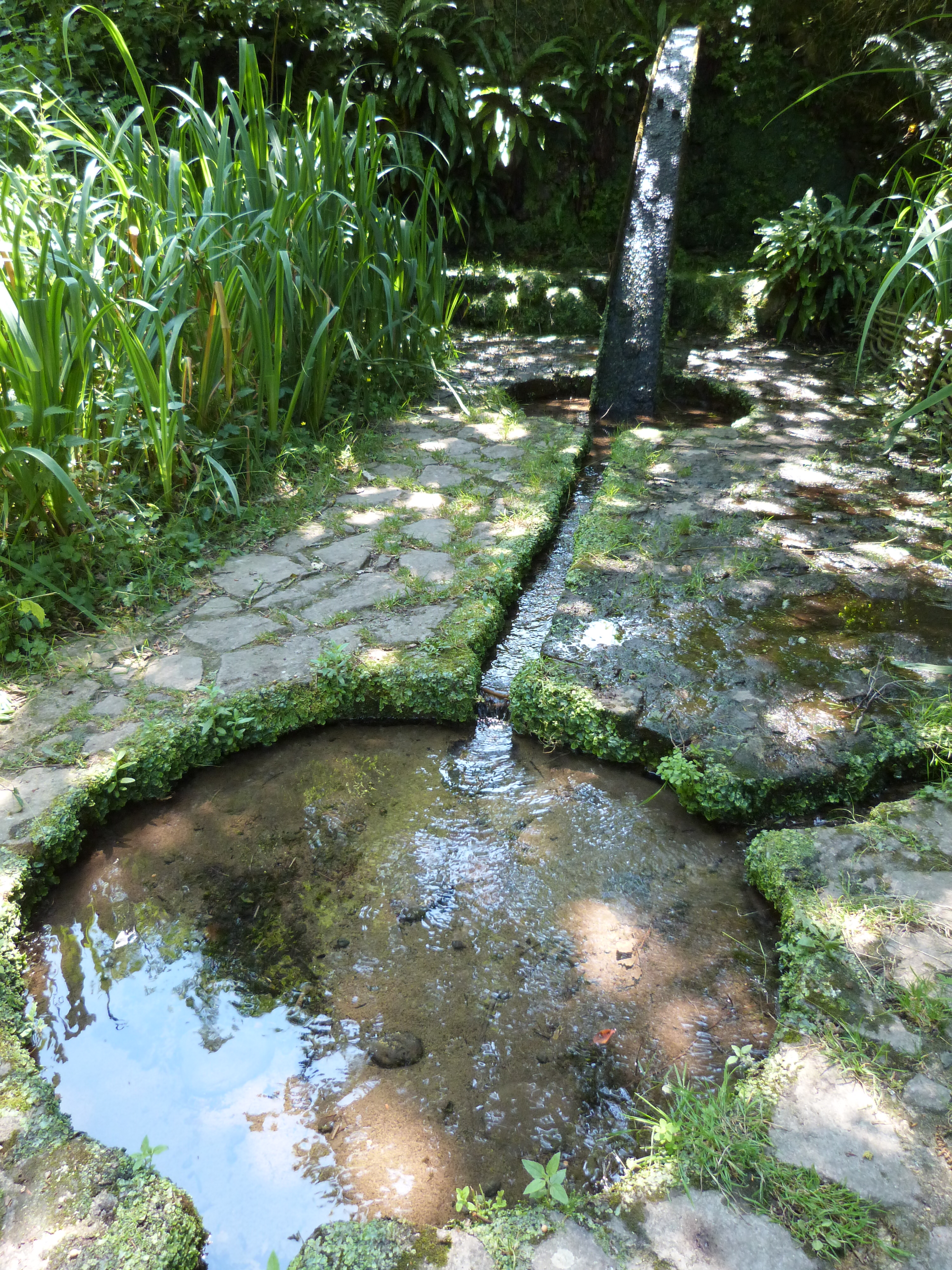
Water source on walkway in the park

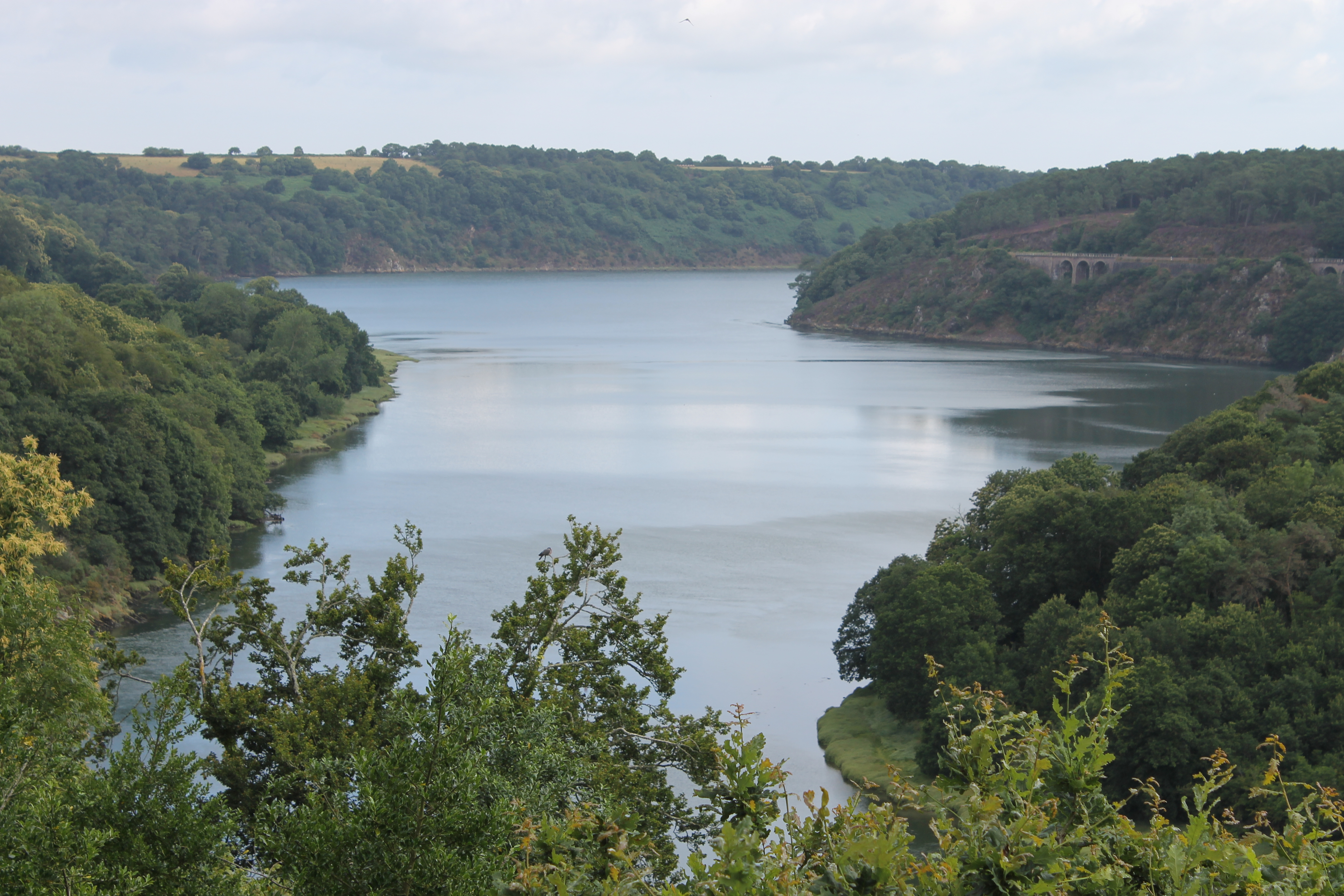
River Trieux from rear of the château looking downstream

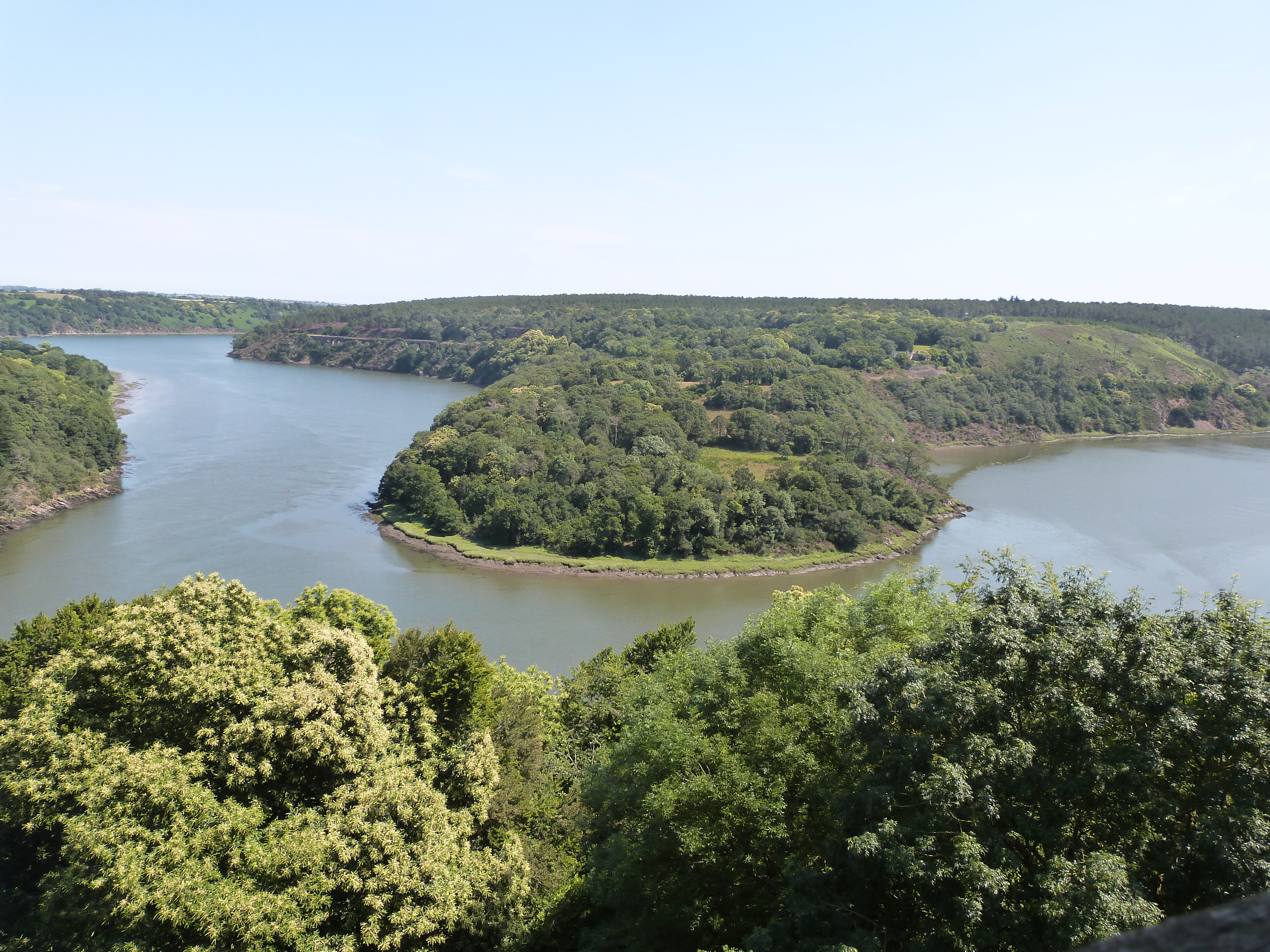
River Trieux, seen from the château
