= Leff (river) =

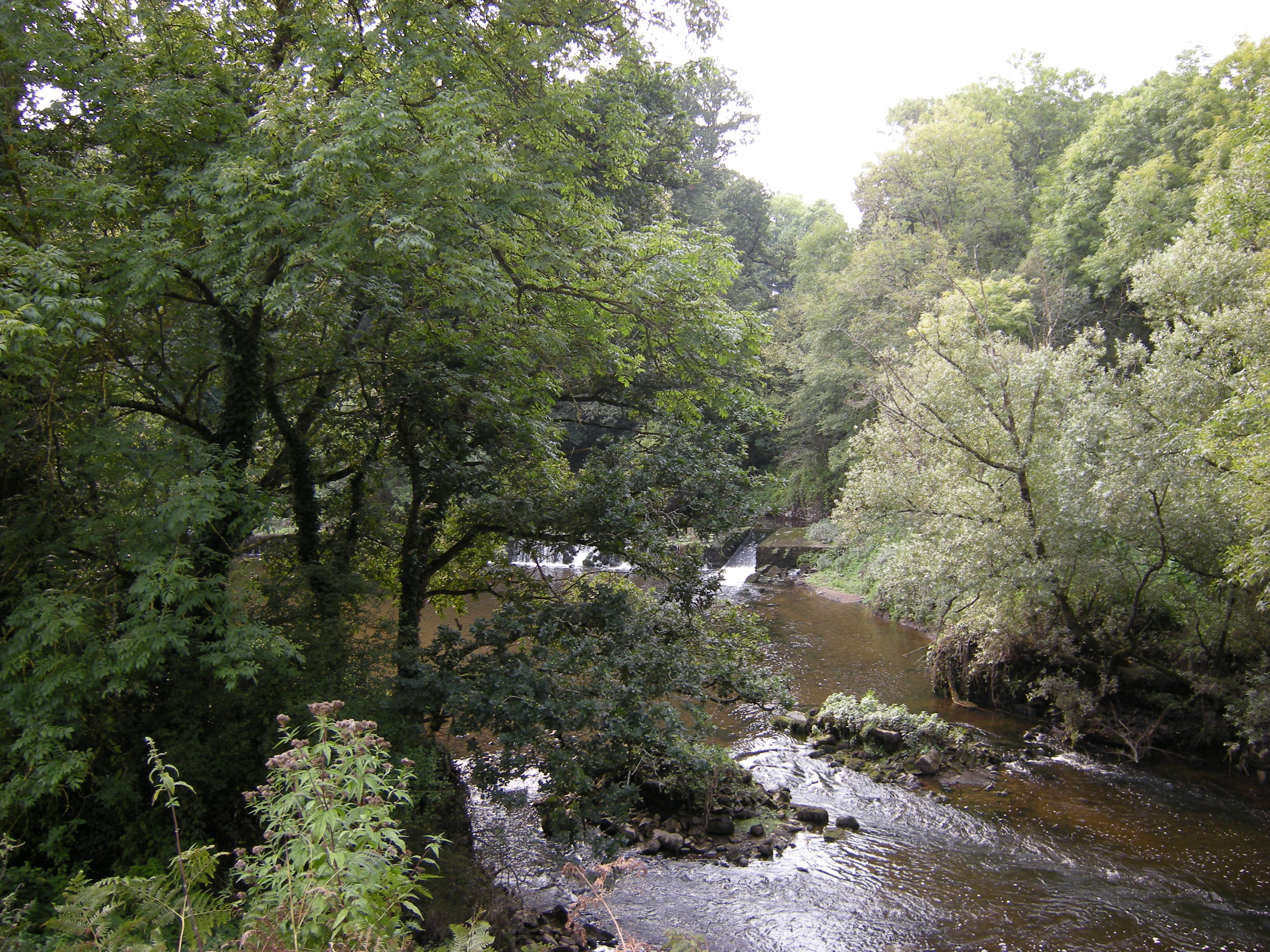

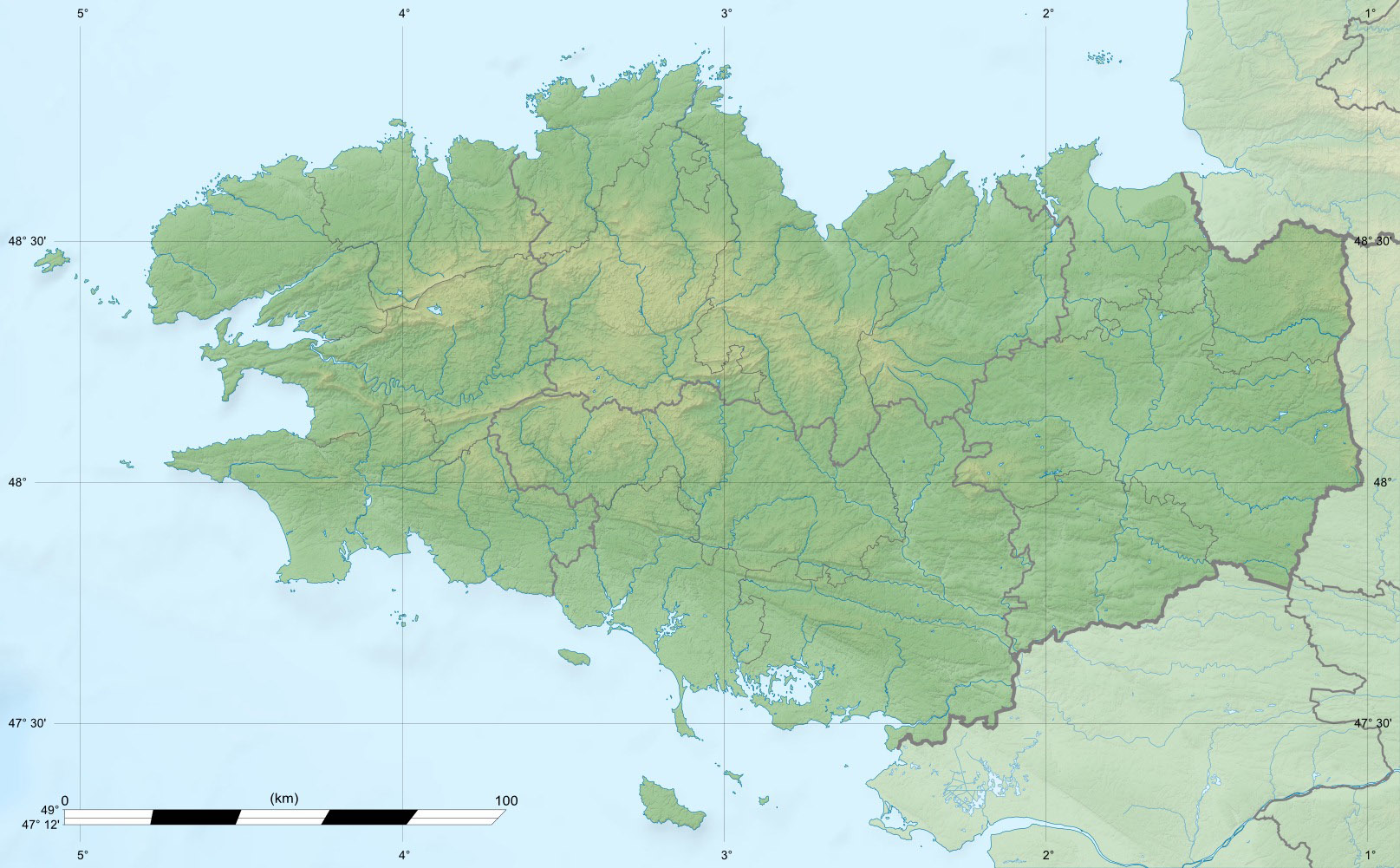
- Location within France Location within Brittany

Location
- Country: France

Physical characteristics
- Mouth: Trieux
  - coordinates: 48.7271°N 3.1322°W
- Length: 62.4 km (38.8 mi)

Basin features
- Progression: Trieux→ English Channel

The Leff (Breton: Leñv) is a river in Brittany, France. It is 62.4 km (38.8 mi) long. It flows into the Trieux near Pontrieux.

== Places in or near Leff ==
In the valley of Leff, there is a town called Châtelaudren.
