= Trieux (river) =

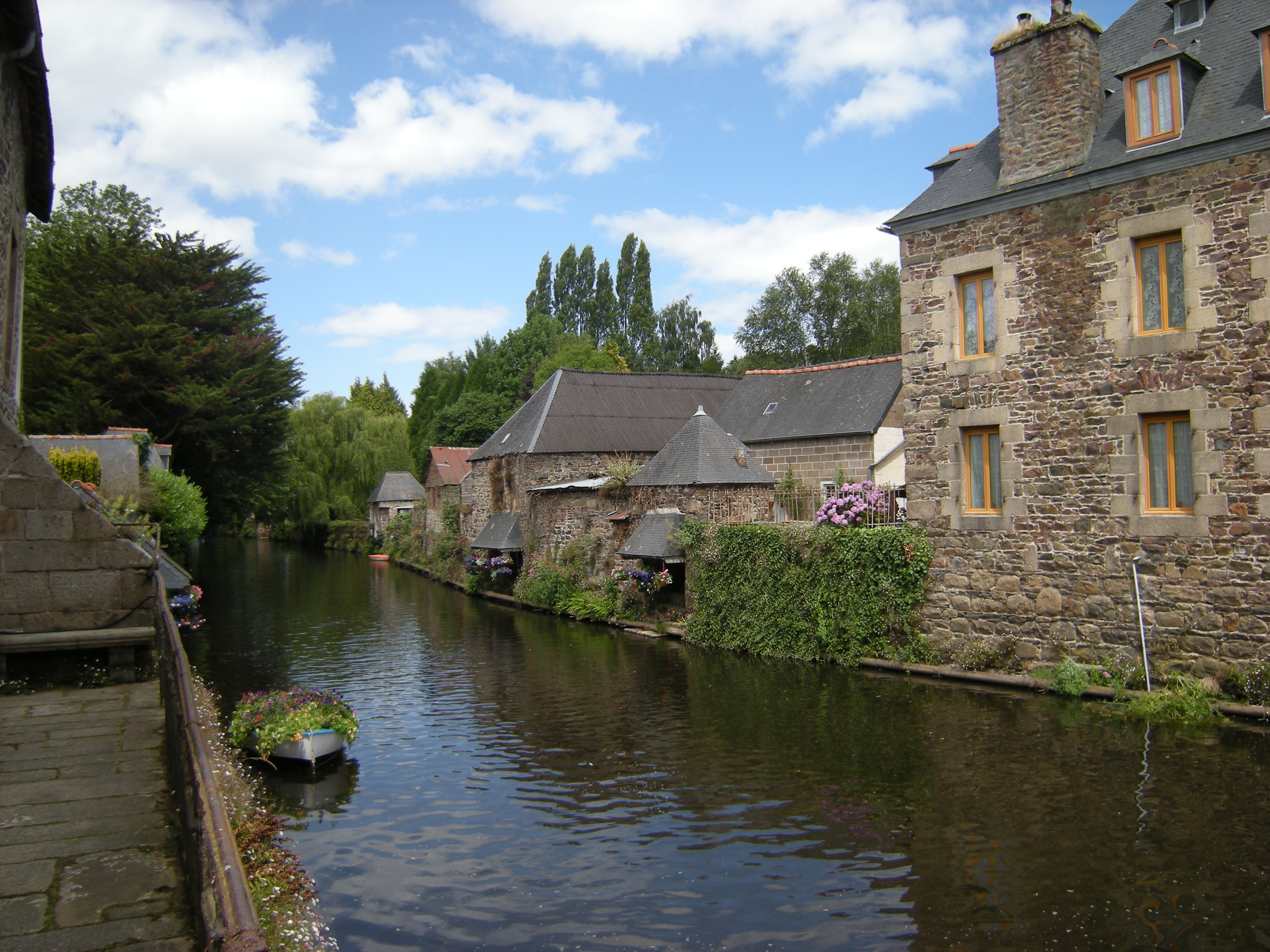
- Trieux running through Pontrieux

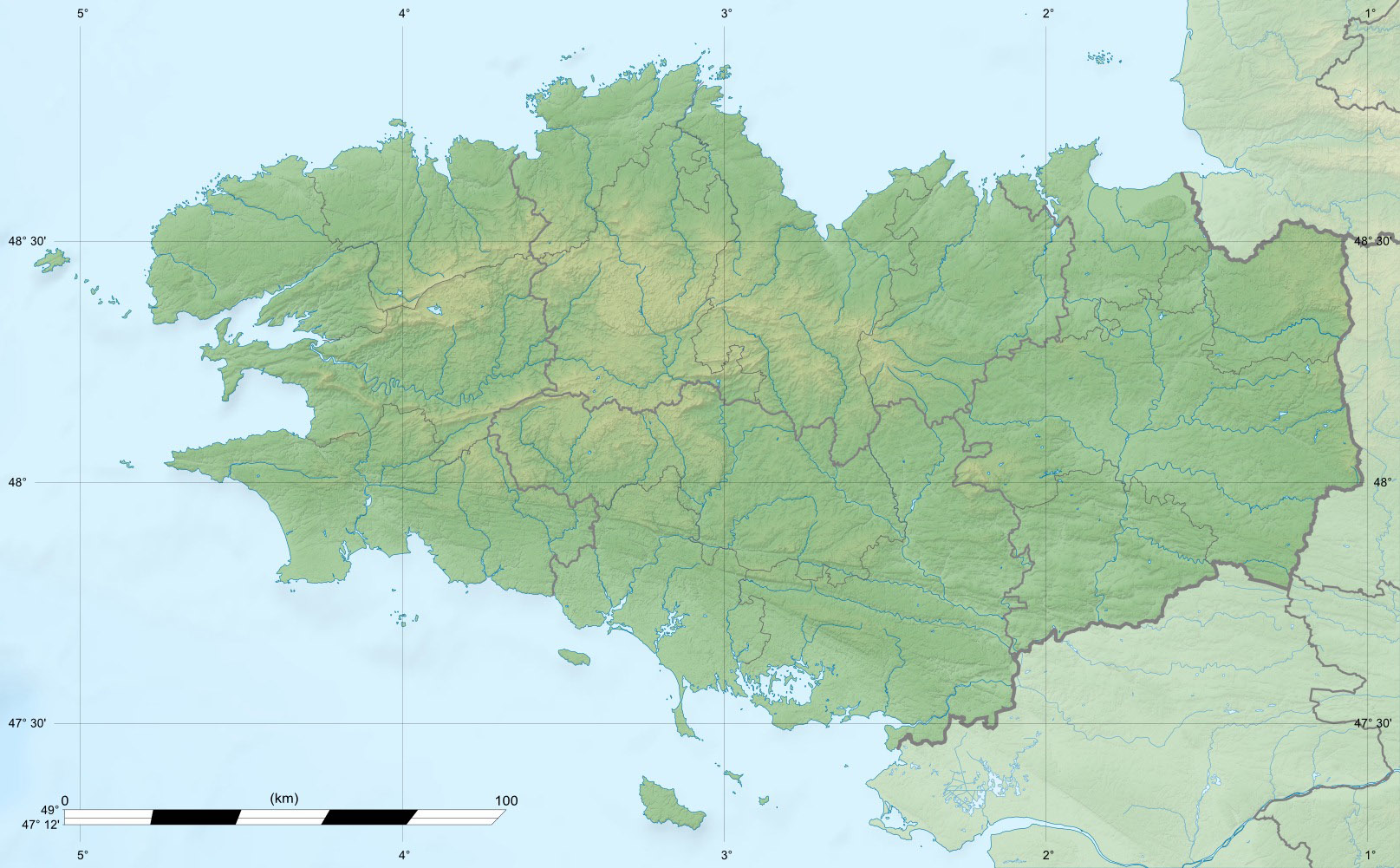

Location
- Country: France

Physical characteristics
- Source
  - location: Brittany
- Mouth
  - location: English Channel
  - coordinates: 48°49′22″N 3°4′19″W
- Length: 72 km (45 mi)

The Trieux (French pronunciation: [tʁijø]; Breton: Trev) is a 72-kilometre-long (45 mi) river in the Côtes-d'Armor department, Brittany, France, beginning near Kerpert. It empties into the English Channel near Lézardrieux. Other towns along the Trieux are Guingamp and Pontrieux. Its longest tributary is the Leff.
