= Château de la Roche (Annesse-et-Beaulieu) =

Château in Nouvelle-Aquitaine, France

Coordinates: 45°11′32″N 0°37′14″E

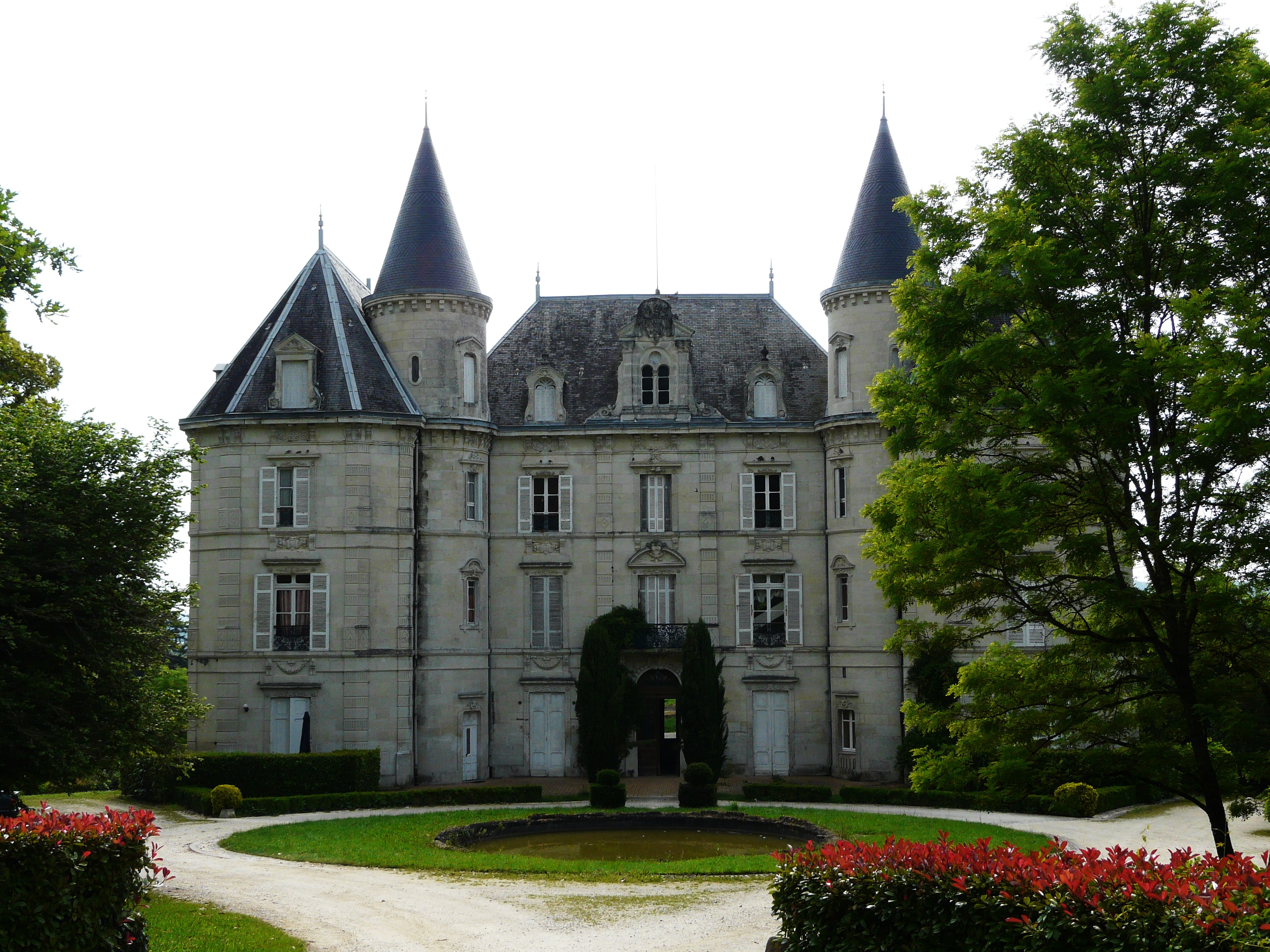

The Château de la Roche is a 19th-century château built by Count Grigory Kushelev-Bezborodko in Annesse-et-Beaulieu, Dordogne, Nouvelle-Aquitaine, France.

== History ==
During World War I, the château served as a military hospital. A U.S. soldier stationed at the hospital later built a folly in Loveland, Ohio, naming it Château Laroche. During World War II, the château served as a hospice for elderly Jewish refugees.
