= Ploëzal =

Ploëzal Pleuzal
- Commune
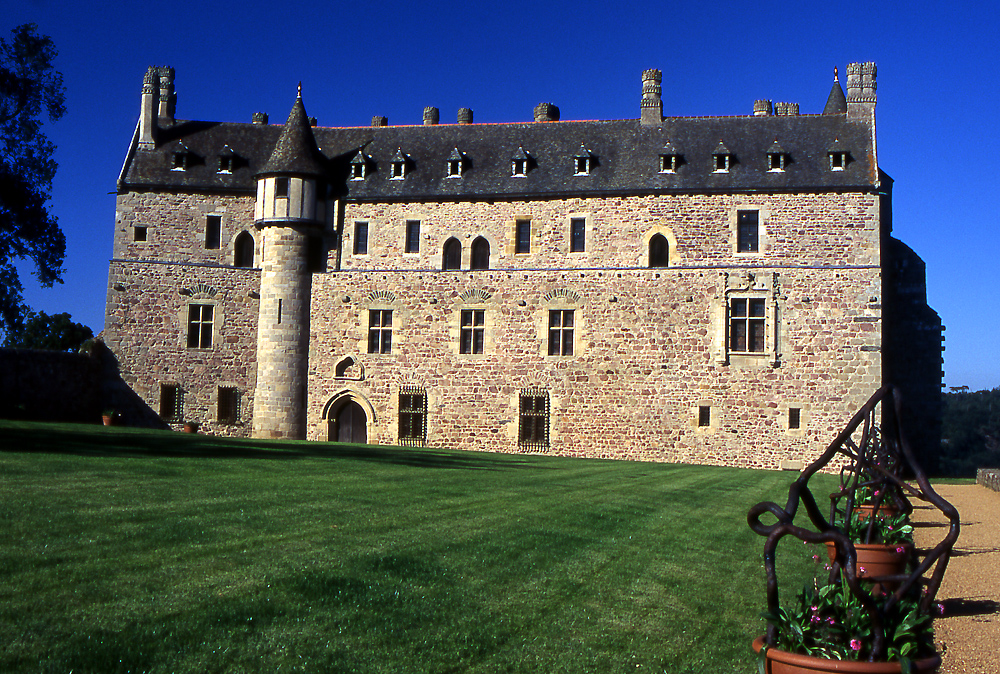
- Château de la Roche-Jagu
- Location of Ploëzal
- Location within France Location within Brittany
- Coordinates: 48°43′02″N 3°12′06″W
- Country: France
- Region: Brittany
- Department: Côtes-d'Armor
- Arrondissement: Guingamp
- Canton: Bégard
- Intercommunality: Guingamp-Paimpol Agglomération

Government
  - Mayor (2020–2026): Guy Connan
- Area^{1}: 26.24 km^{2} (10.13 sq mi)
- Highest elevation: 94 m (308 ft)
- Lowest elevation: 2 m (6.6 ft)
- Population (2023): 1,229
  - Density: 46.84/km^{2} (121.3/sq mi)
- Time zone: UTC+01:00 (CET)
  - Summer (DST): UTC+02:00 (CEST)
- INSEE/Postal code: 22204 /22260
- ^{1} French Land Register data, which excludes lakes, ponds, glaciers > 1 km^{2} (0.386 sq mi or 247 acres) and river estuaries.

Ploëzal (French pronunciation: [plɔezal]; Breton: Pleuzal) is a commune in the Côtes-d'Armor department of Brittany in northwestern France.

== Population ==
Historical population
Year	Pop.	±% p.a.
1968	1,458	—
1975	1,445	−0.13%
1982	1,301	−1.49%
1990	1,232	−0.68%
1999	1,190	−0.38%
2007	1,203	+0.14%
2012	1,265	+1.01%
2017	1,250	−0.24%
2023	1,229	−0.28%
Source: INSEE

Inhabitants of Ploëzal are called ploëzalais in French.

== See also ==
- Communes of the Côtes-d'Armor department
