= Chateau Laroche =

Curiosity museum in Loveland, Ohio, US

Château Laroche
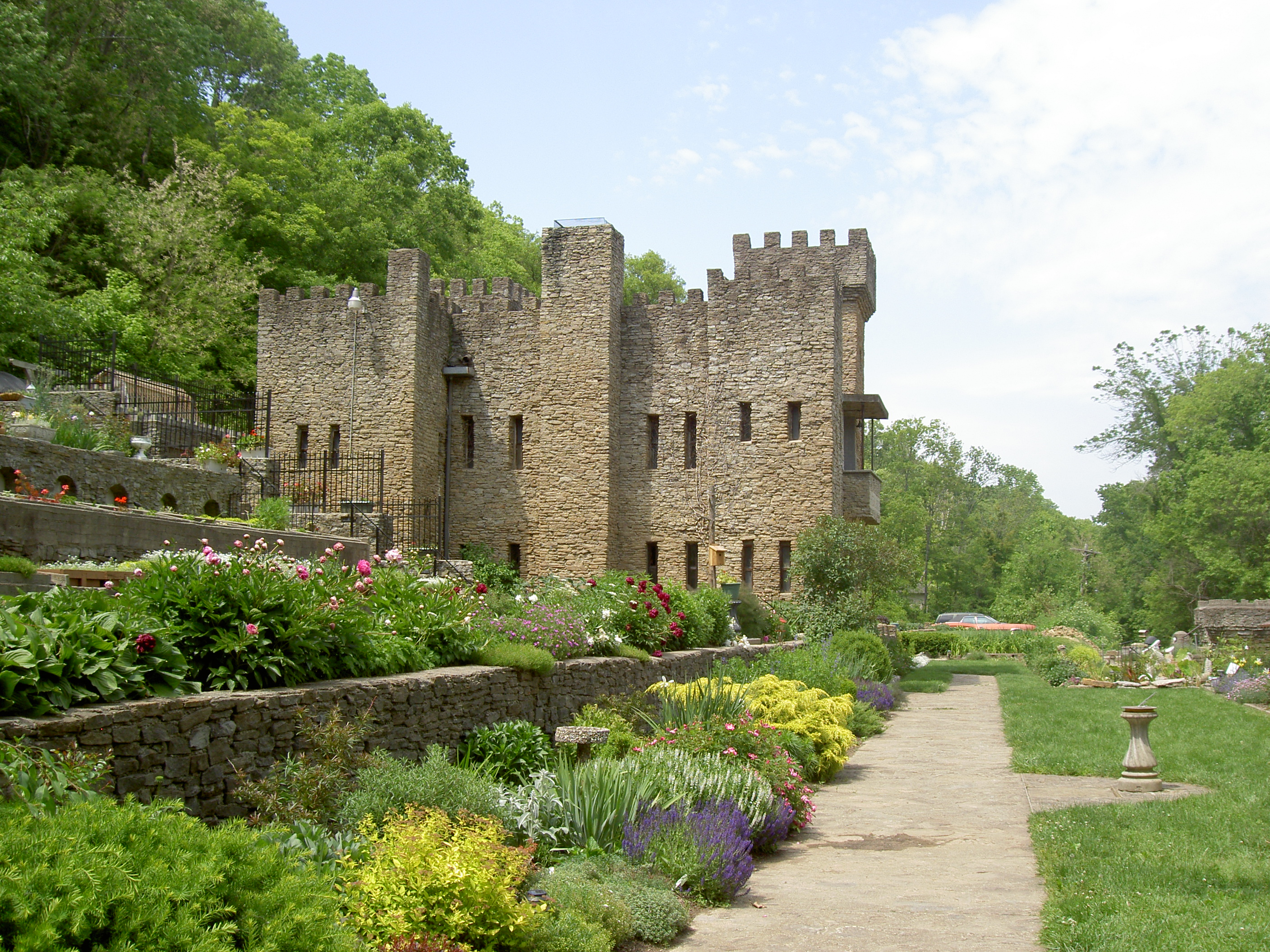
- Château Laroche, "The Loveland Castle"
- Established: 1929
- Location: Symmes Township, Hamilton County, Ohio, US
- Coordinates: 39.283234°N 84.266225°W
- Type: Curiosity museum
- Director: Maintained by the KOGT
- Website: www.lovelandcastle.com

Château Laroche, also known as the Loveland Castle, is a museum on the banks of the Little Miami River north of Loveland, Ohio, United States. Built in the style of a Medieval castle, construction began in 1927 by Boy Scout troop leader, World War I veteran, and medievalist Harry D. Andrews. He built the castle on promotional plots of land that were obtained by paying for one-year subscriptions to The Cincinnati Enquirer. Andrews named his castle after a military hospital in the Château de la Roche ("Rock Castle" in French) in southwest France, built in 19th-century château built by Russian Count Grigory Kushelev-Bezborodko. Andrew stayed in this castle when he was stationed during the First World War.

For over fifty years, Andrews worked on his castle project. He pulled stones from the nearby Little Miami River, and when that supply was exhausted, molded bricks with cement and quart milk cartons.

Upon his death in 1981, Andrews bequeathed the castle to his Boy Scout troop, the Knights of the Golden Trail (KOGT). The Castle has been extensively upgraded and renovated in the years since Andrews' death and has been mostly completed by the KOGT. The East tower now houses a short video presentation on Andrews' quest to finish his dream. The walls of the upstairs chapel feature many stones brought back by Andrews in his world travels and others sent to him from foreign locations by his friends and followers. Recently completed are an expansion to the outside gardens and a greenhouse.

Tales of the castle being haunted – often coming from Chateau Laroche's own volunteer knights – have been reported over the years.

== Gallery ==
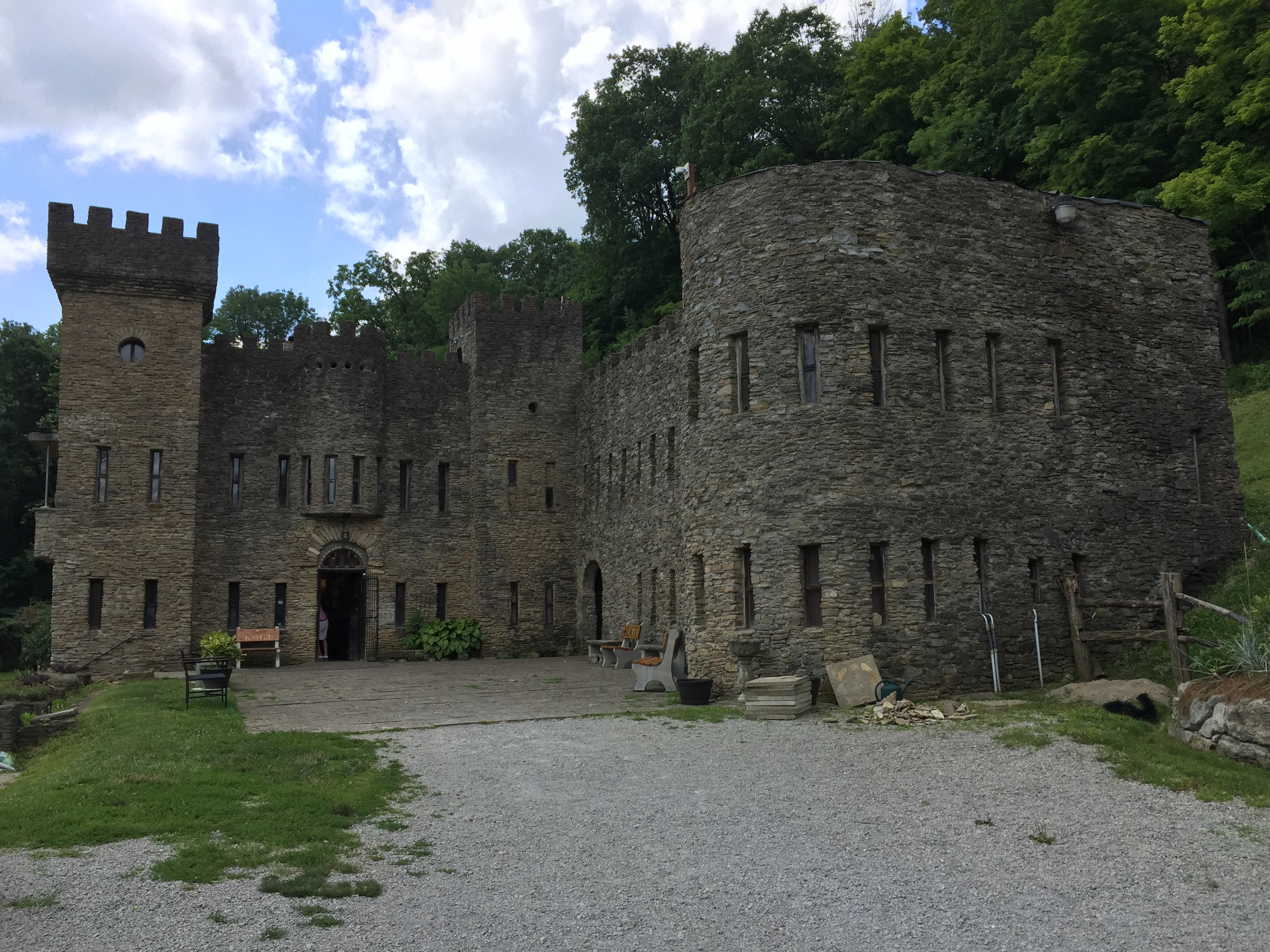
Exterior

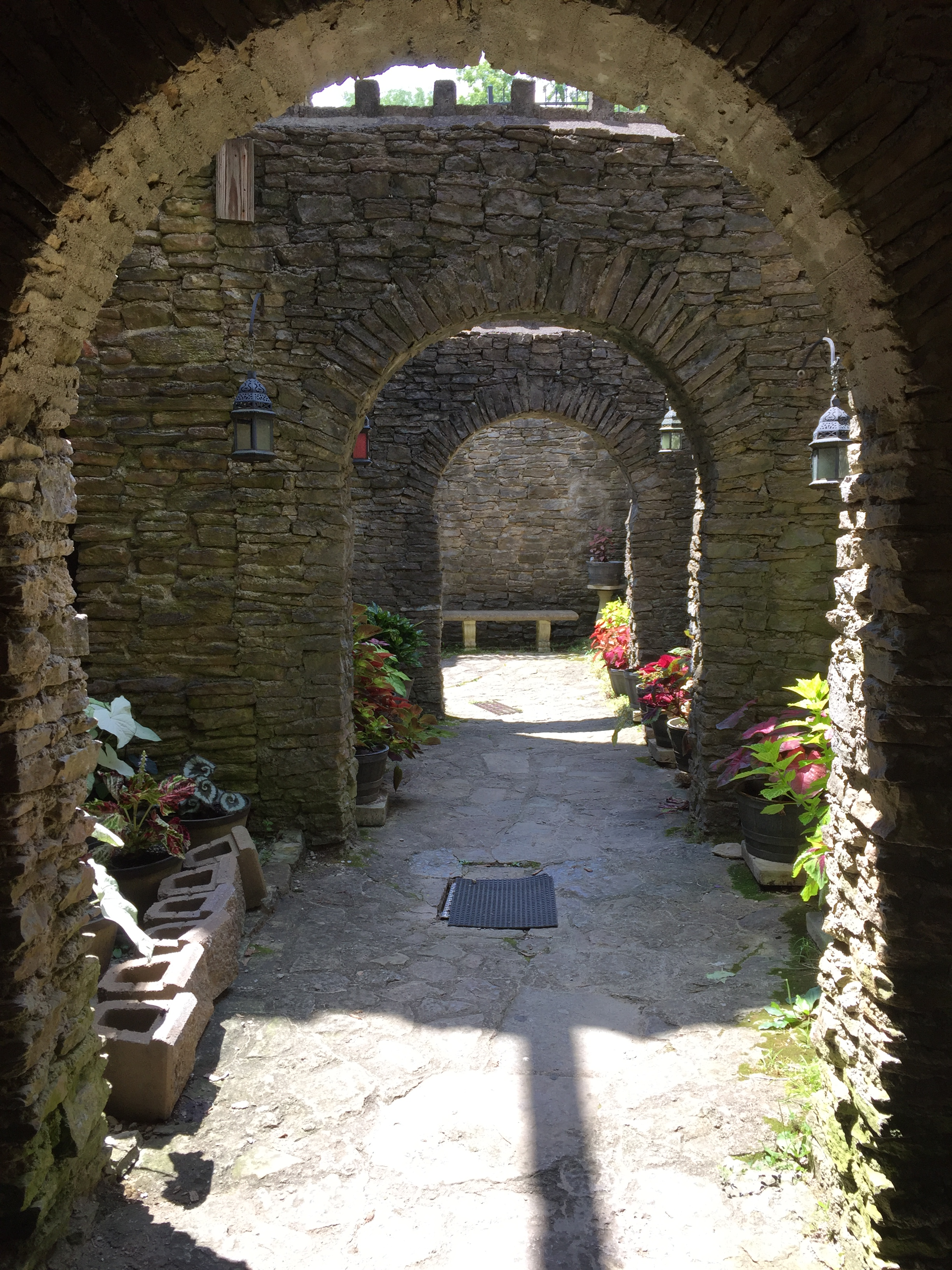
Exterior arches

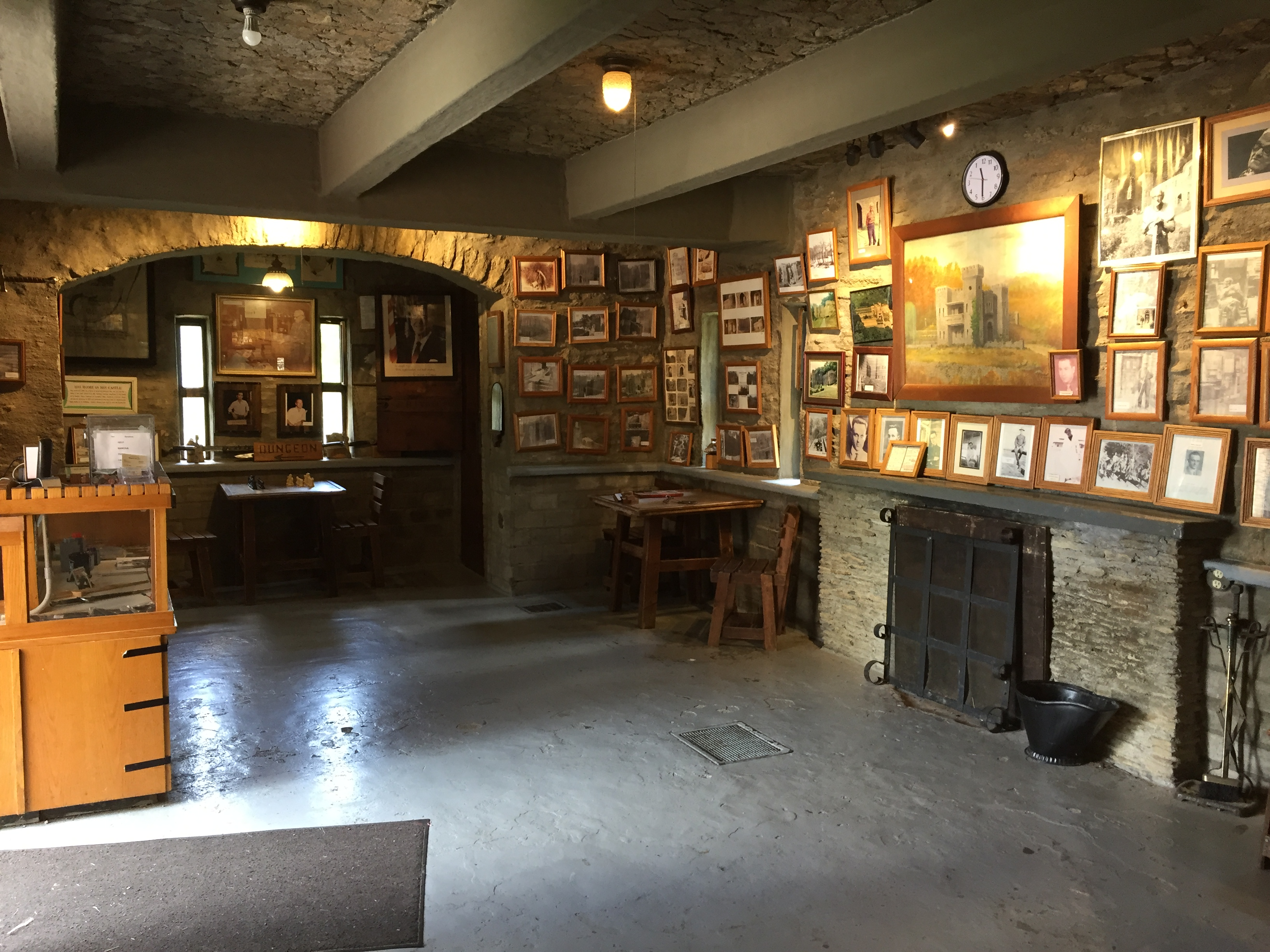
Interior

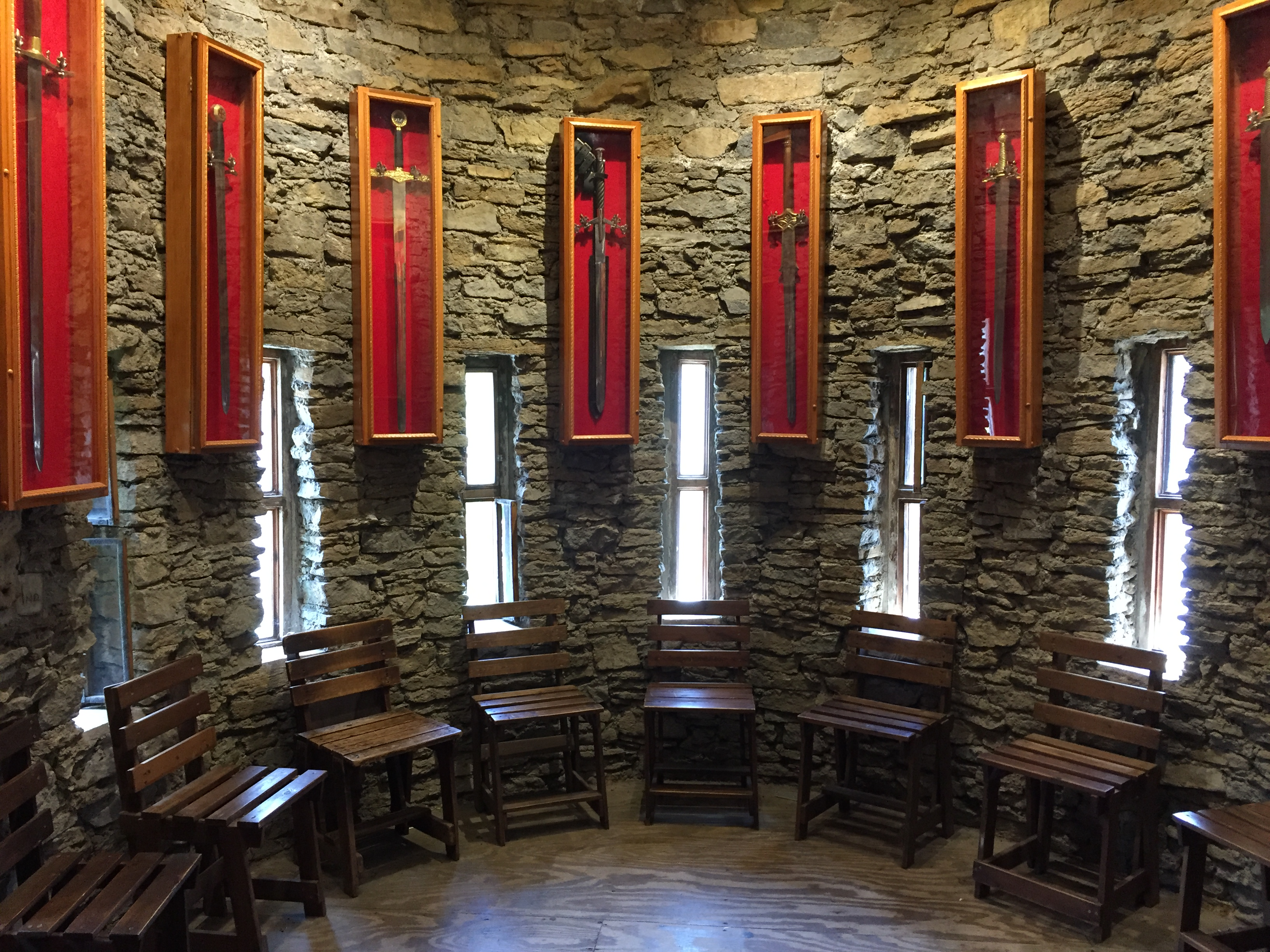
Interior
