= Château de La Roche (Saint-Priest-la-Roche) =

Castle in Loire, France

Coordinates: 45°53′45″N 4°06′06″E

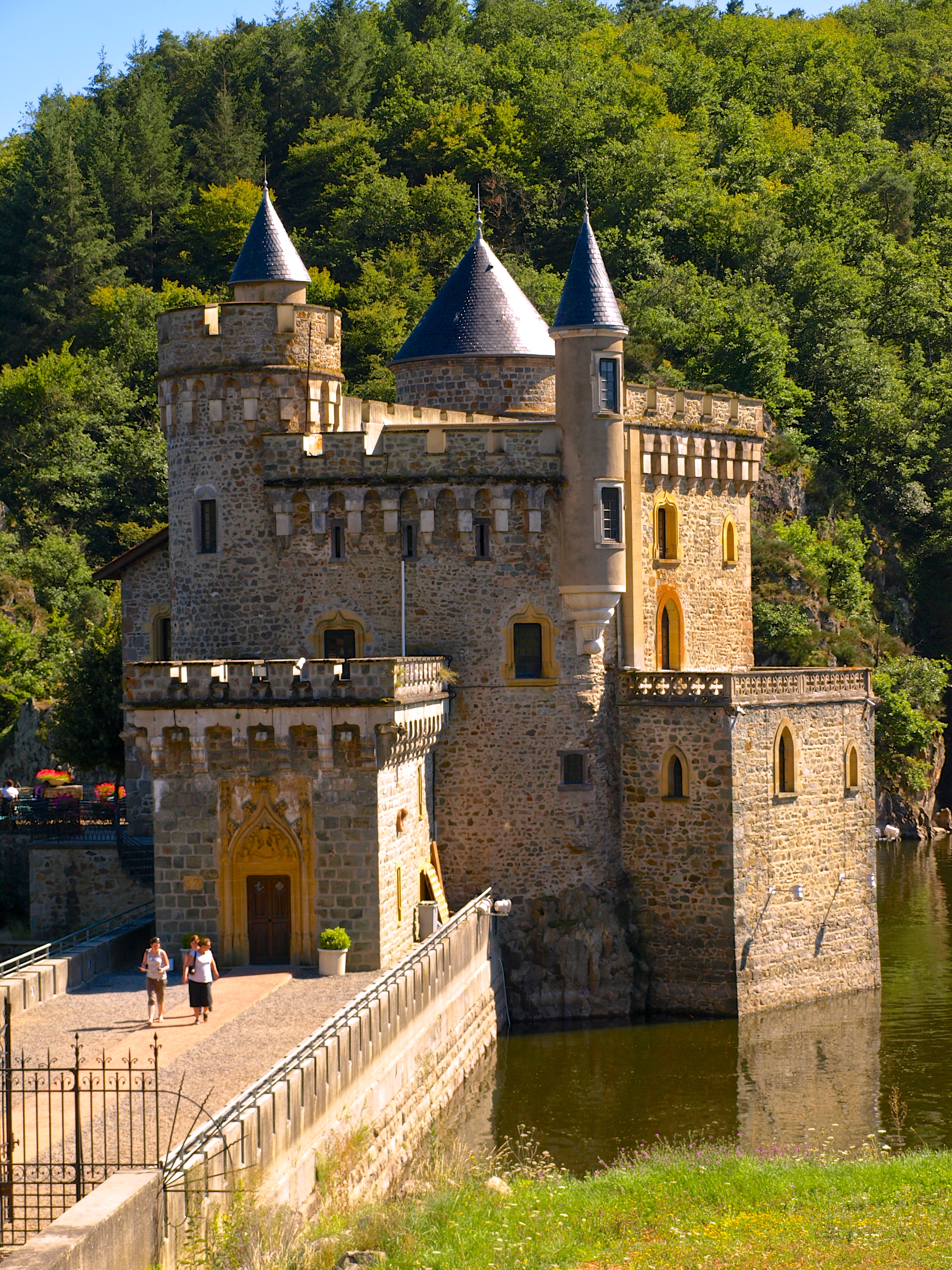
The Château de La Roche

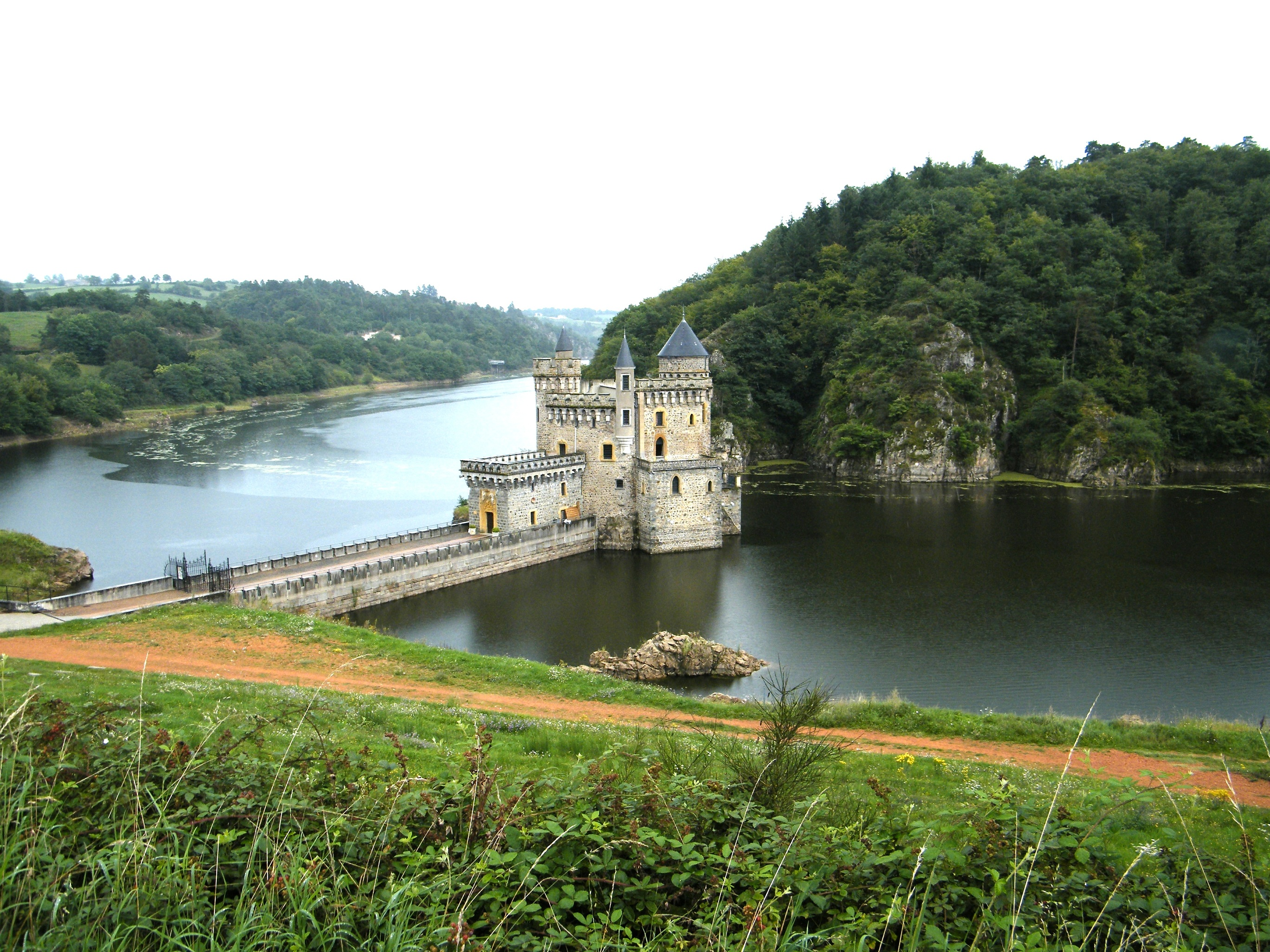
The castle and the lake in 2011

The Château de La Roche (French pronunciation: [ʃato d(ə) la ʁɔʃ]) is a restored castle in the commune of Saint-Priest-la-Roche in the Loire department of France, 20 km south of Roanne. The castle stands on an island in the lake formed by the Villerest Dam.

== History ==
The earliest written records of the castle date from 1260. It was built on a rocky platform overlooking the Loire river from a height of 30 metres. The fortress allowed a watch to be kept and tolls to be collected for the County of Forez border. The building suffered floods from the Loire more often than attacks from enemies.

In 1290, Girard de La Roche paid homage to the Count of Forez for his house in La Roche.

In the 17th century, because of repetitive floods, the castle lost its attraction, resembling more and more a fortified house that became a ruin in later centuries. At the end of the 1900s, an industrialist from Roanne bought the castle and restored it in the Gothic style, intending it as a second home.

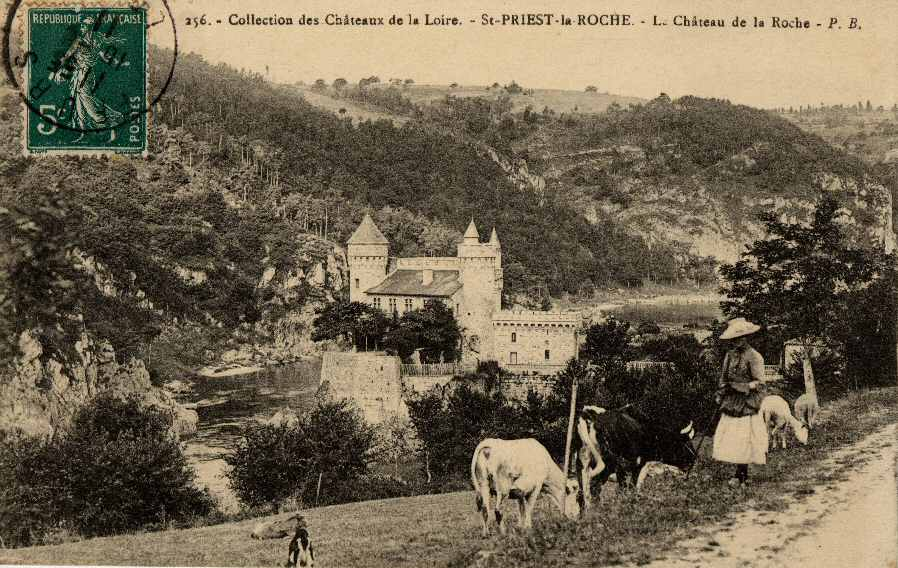
The château on a 1910 postcard

During the 1930s, the construction project for the Villerest Dam by EDF condemned the château to disappear below the water. The structure degraded very quickly and was subject to numerous acts of vandalism. It was finally bought for a symbolic one franc by the commune.

During the construction of the dam in 1984, the château was the only building spared by the waters. It is now situated on an island. In 1996, it was entirely restored and the side facing the water was remodelled to permit access throughout the year.

The regulation of the waters of the Loire have not fully protected the château; it was affected by floodwater in 2003 and 2008.

== See also ==
- List of castles in France
