= Pontrieux =

Pontrieux Pontrev
- Commune
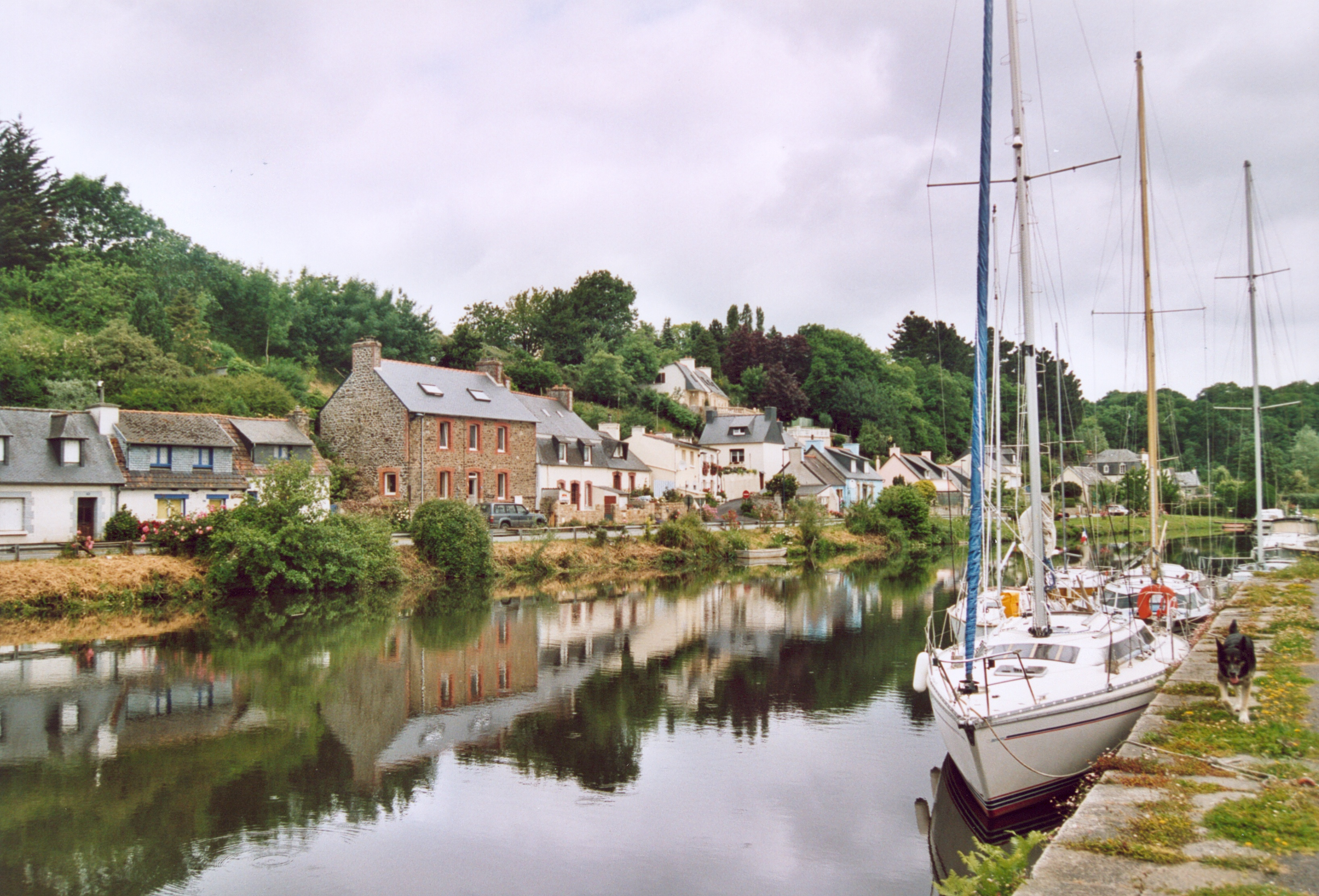
- Port on the Trieux River

- Flag Coat of arms
- Location of Pontrieux
- Location within France Location within Brittany
- Coordinates: 48°41′57″N 3°09′29″W
- Country: France
- Region: Brittany
- Department: Côtes-d'Armor
- Arrondissement: Guingamp
- Canton: Bégard
- Intercommunality: Guingamp-Paimpol Agglomération

Government
  - Mayor (2020–2026): Samuel Le Gaouyat
- Area^{1}: 1.02 km^{2} (0.39 sq mi)
- Highest elevation: 77 m (253 ft)
- Lowest elevation: 7 m (23 ft)
- Population (2023): 1,002
  - Density: 982/km^{2} (2,540/sq mi)
- Time zone: UTC+01:00 (CET)
  - Summer (DST): UTC+02:00 (CEST)
- INSEE/Postal code: 22250 /22260
- ^{1} French Land Register data, which excludes lakes, ponds, glaciers > 1 km^{2} (0.386 sq mi or 247 acres) and river estuaries.

Pontrieux (French pronunciation: [pɔ̃tʁi'jø]; Breton: Pontrev) is a town and commune in the Côtes-d'Armor department of Brittany in northwestern France.

== Population ==
Historical population
Year	Pop.	±% p.a.
1968	1,411	—
1975	1,359	−0.53%
1982	1,146	−2.41%
1990	1,050	−1.09%
1999	1,121	+0.73%
2007	1,110	−0.12%
2012	1,016	−1.75%
2017	1,028	+0.24%
2023	1,002	−0.43%
Source: INSEE

Inhabitants of Pontrieux are called pontriviens in French.

== See also ==
- Communes of the Côtes-d'Armor department
