= Voie ferrée d'intérêt local =

Type of rural railway in France

In France, a voie ferrée d'intérêt local (pronounced [vwa fɛʁe dɛ̃teʁɛ lɔkal]; "Railway of Local Interest"), abbreviated VFIL, is a secondary railway constructed by a local administrative division, serving sparsely populated rural areas. These areas were beyond the economic reach of the networks of the intérêt général, which were concessions of the grandes compagnies ("Big Companies") (Note: By grandes compagnies is meant the principal railway companies, analogous to the Big Four British railway companies: Chemin de Fer du Nord; Chemins de fer de Paris à Lyon et à la Méditerranée; Chemin de Fer de Paris à Orléans et du Midi; Chemins de fer de l'Est; Chemins de Fer de l'État; Chemins de Fer de l'Ouest; Réseau Ferroviaire d'Alsace-Lorraine; These were nationalised on 1 January 1938, forming the SNCF.) who ran their lines for profit.

== Origins ==
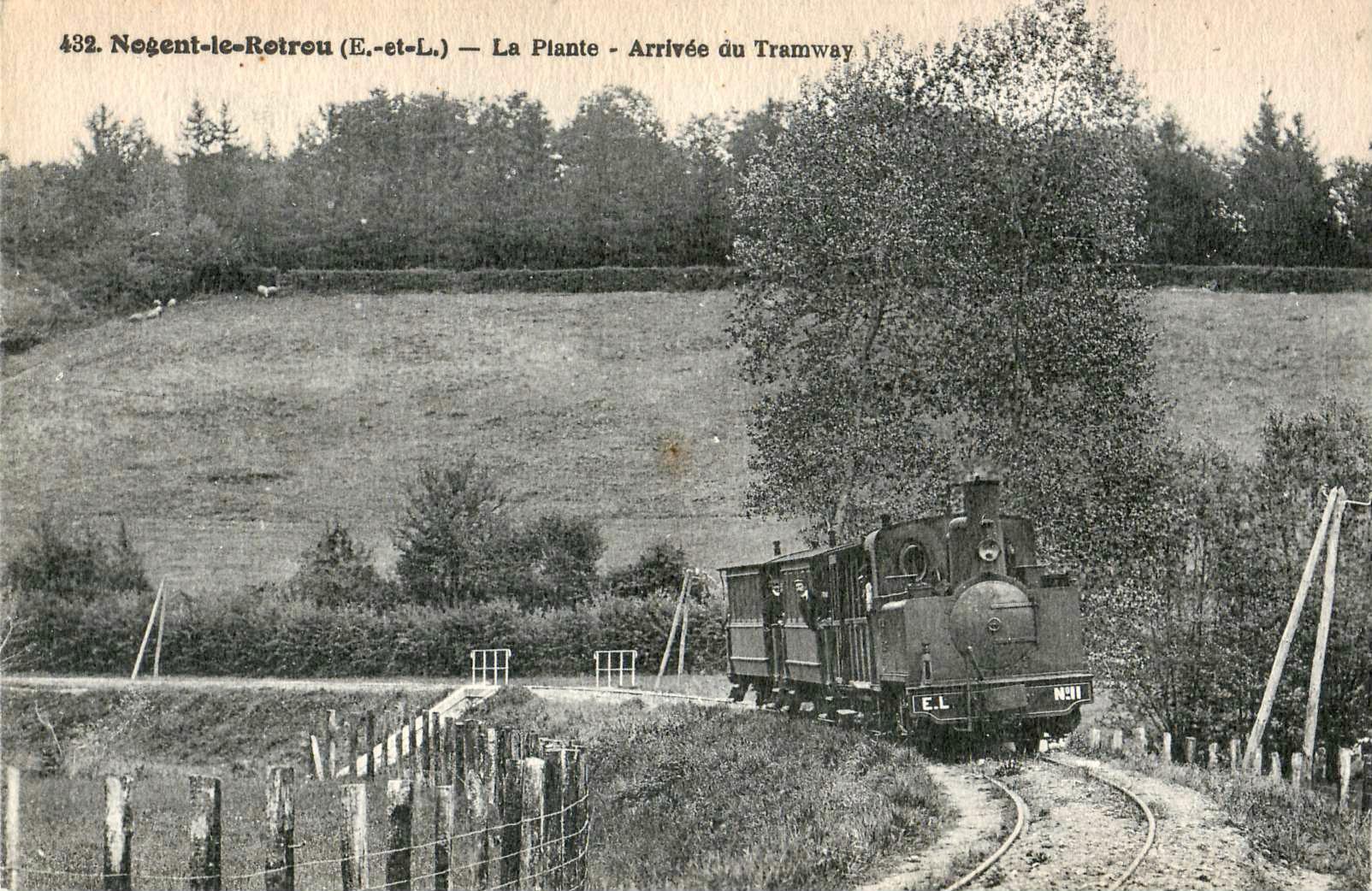
A Tramways d'Eure-et-Loir train, photographed near Nogent-le-Rotrou in 1910

The Prefect of the Bas-Rhin department, Monsieur Migneret, invented the VFIL concept with the passing of the Act of 21 May 1836 which defined the prefecture's powers over highways. This economical mode of transport piqued the interest of other departments, and became the object of an inquiry. This led to the Act of 12 July 1865 which authorised departments and communes to implement VFILs, either themselves or through concessions, with the State's assistance and control. Local bodies had a great deal of autonomy over both technical and financial planning. But the system was open to abuse: the law, in providing State subsidies of start-up capital, encouraged speculation; in many cases, schemes started with this capital were later abandoned because of technical difficulties.

The State had to restore good order to the situation and, in 1878, Charles de Freycinet, the new Minister of Public Works, gave France a vision of a comprehensive system of railways. He introduced rail transport, if not to every chef-lieu, at least to the regions still unconnected by train. De Freycinet then commissioned a two-part plan, known as the Plan Freycinet:

- Plan A, enacted 17 July 1879, comprised the Big Companies' lines (the lignes d'intérêt général and others of medium importance).
- Plan B, never enacted, listed the lignes d'intérêt local concessions made under the provisions of the law of 12 July 1865, and their integration with the larger networks. These provisions did nothing to address regulated routes either planned or imagined by the departments to provide secondary connections (broadly, branch line service).

== Rise and fall ==
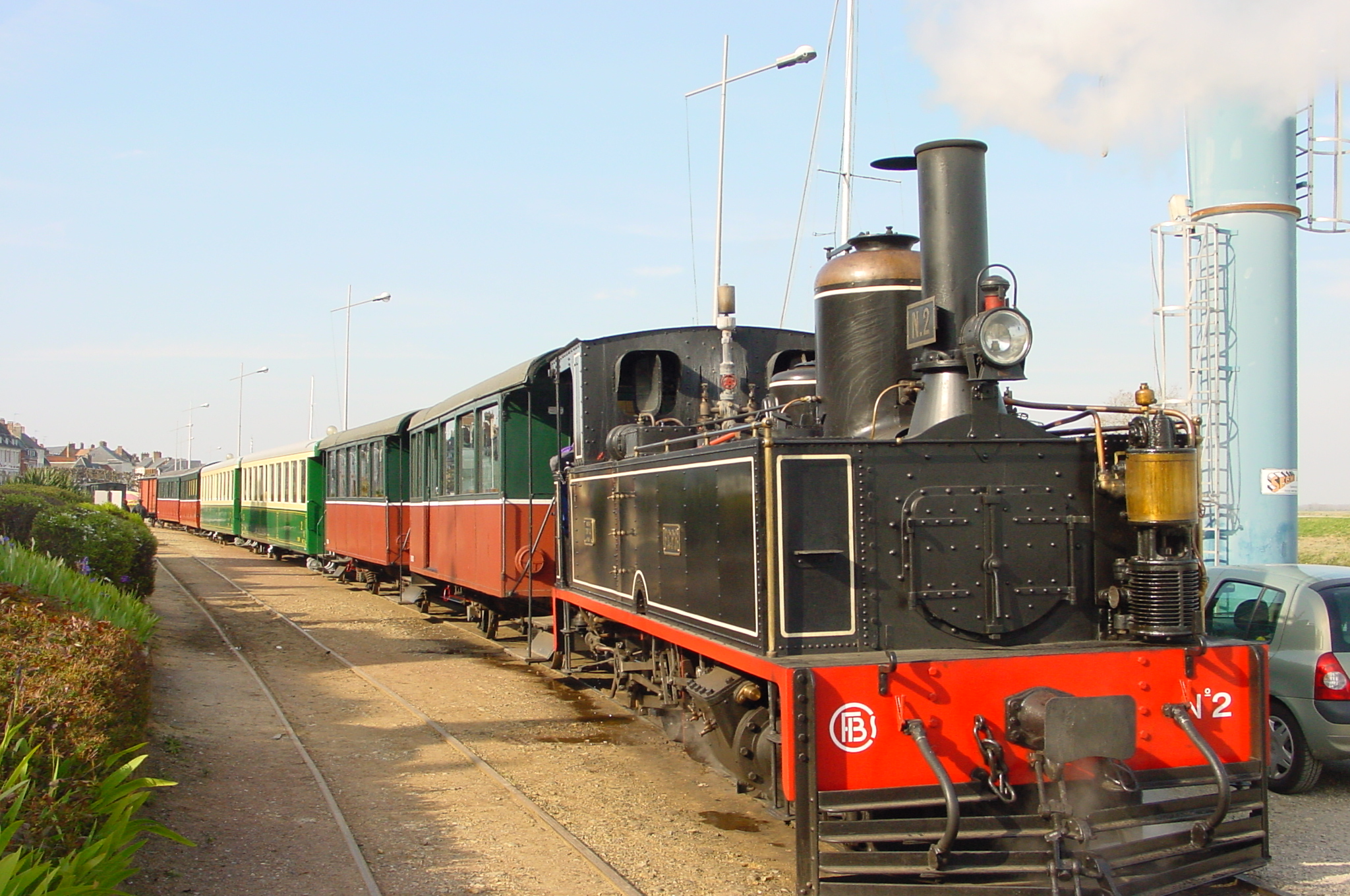
The Chemin de Fer de la baie de Somme is now a heritage railway

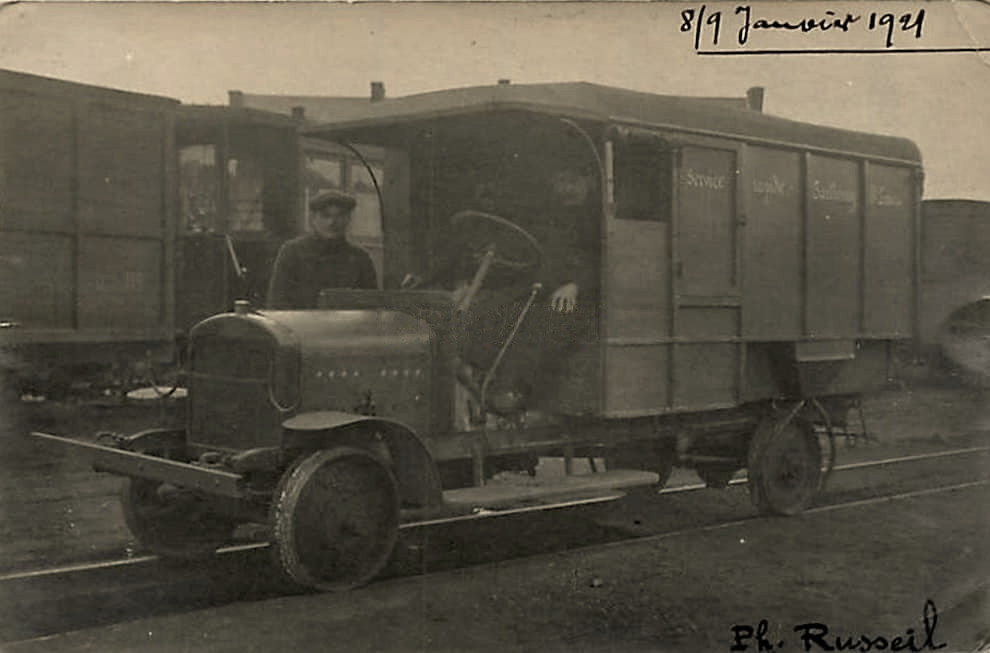
Converted lorry used for express goods and courier services, 1921

To breathe new life into VFILs, it was necessary to enact a new law clarifying the situation. This act became law on 11 June 1880 and fixed problems with State subsidies, guaranteeing, under certain conditions, to regulate the connections with the Big Companies.

The secondary railways then grew spectacularly, from just 2,187 km (1,359 mi) of route in 1880 to 17,653 km (10,969 mi) in 1913. This expansion was somewhat anarchic, and once again it became being necessary to change legislation so that it encompassed both railways proper and tramways that ran on normal streets. This was done with the law of 31 July 1913, designating them both under the name VFIL and establishing a new, more-logical classification distinguishing railways and urban tramways.

The Inter-war period saw new laws (of 1 October 1926 and 17 April 1927, for example) which, with their measures of decentralisation and removal of red tape, tried to ease the financial difficulties of companies already closing their lines and often replacing them with road transport.

Though the VFILs made up a baby boom, their lives were brief; only two or three generations will ever have seen them in use. In 1928 the various networks were at their largest, 20,291 km (12,608 mi). In the Second World War many lines closed, victims of both the road and their own slowness. Not long after the end of the war, from the early 1950s, the survivors fell one by one. But a few still survive, sometimes as heritage railways such as the Chemin de Fer de la baie de Somme.

The development of secondary railways happened at the same time throughout Europe. In Belgium, the SNCV created infrastructure and rolling stock to respond to the same need, but they evolved differently for many different reasons (construction by a single national body, the higher population density, a greater number of connections, partial electrification, and so on) and their development culminated around 1950.

== Minimal cost ==
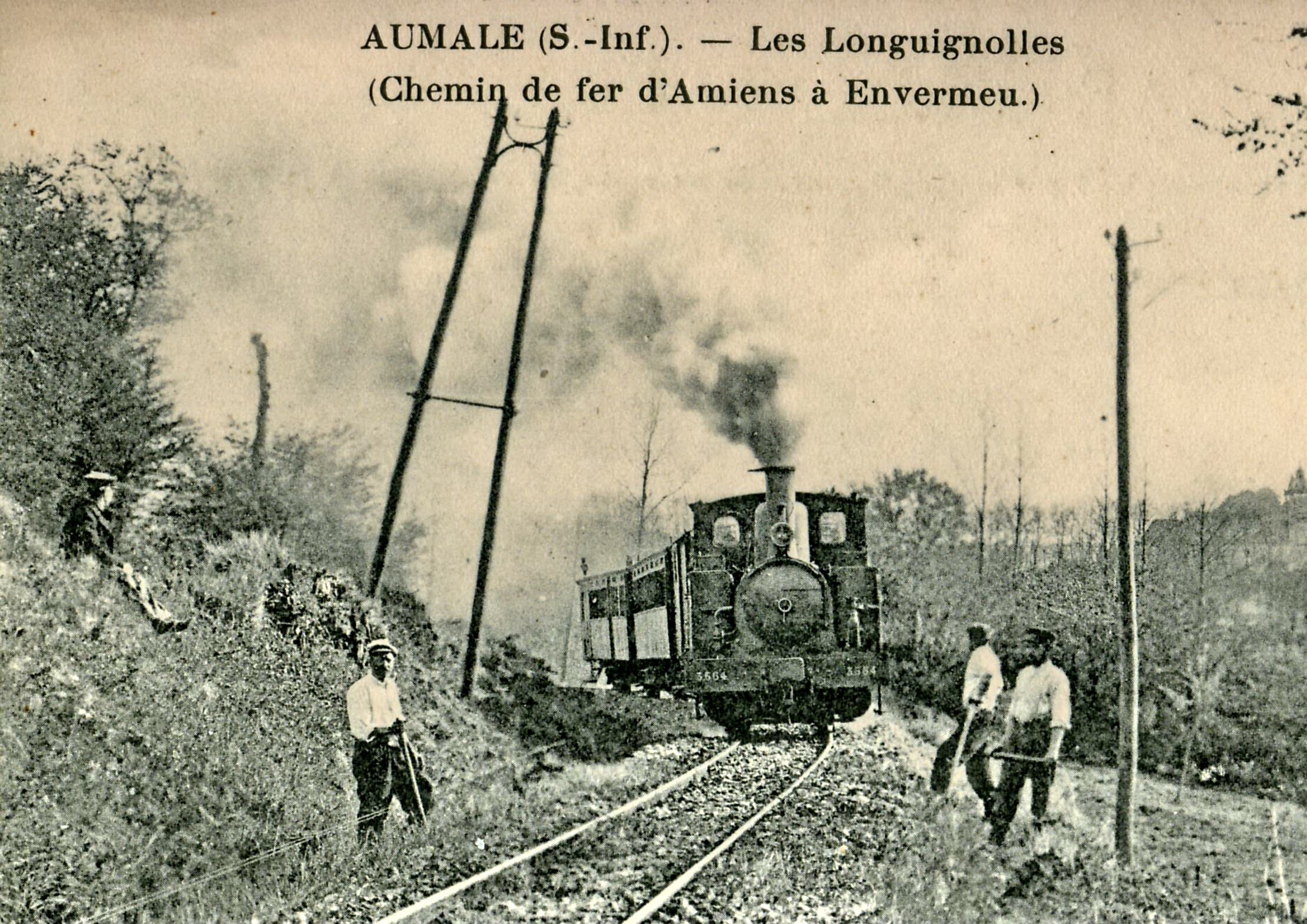
The Amiens – Aumale – Envermeu line in the Somme and Seine-Inférieure, used metre gauge

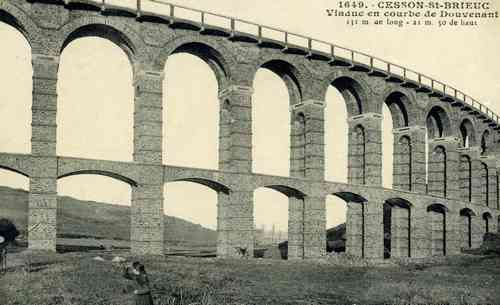
Although most lines were rather dull, some had remarkable features. This is the Douvenant Viaduct at the start of the 20th century, on the Chemin de Fer des Côtes-du-Nord

On the secondary railways, everything was designed to save money, which did not necessarily entail poor workmanship or mediocre service.

Lines were generally narrow gauge, varying from 600 mm (1 ft 11 5/8 in) (Calvados network) to 1,000 mm (3 ft 3 3/8 in) as was more common. There were instances where standard gauge of 1,435 mm (4 ft 8 1/2 in) was adopted, often to facilitate the transfer of through traffic to main line railways, such as on the Montérolier-Buchy - Saint-Saëns line in Seine-Inférieure.

To keep construction costs down, routes followed the terrain as much as possible, with gradients as steep as 1:22.22 (4.5%) to 1:20 (5%) compared to no more than 1:40 (2.5%) on more traditional lines, with the exception of some mountain railways. Curves could have radii of less than 30 m (98 ft). The rail tracks used were very light; generally Vignoles rail, with mass being 9 to 35 kilograms per metre (18.1 to 70.6 lb/yd) depending on the distance. In many cases, lines were laid over road shoulders, which reduced the need to buy land and, above all, limited the need for new bridges and tunnels. But these measures severely limited the maximum operational speed, generally to less than 30 km/h (19 mph).

Signalling was itself minimal because of the small number of journeys (generally six a day before the First World War, and a few infrequent freight trains each week, fewer after 1914). Road users were warned of level crossings by simple traffic signs saying Attention au train, which in the 1930s were augmented by the Cross of St Andrew; never a barrier. Stations were built in the same style, of small dimensions: a little waiting room and, attached to it, a modest ticket hall leading to a platform long enough to serve the most populous locality. A simple shelter or just a signpost marked out halts or flag stops.

== Small trains ==
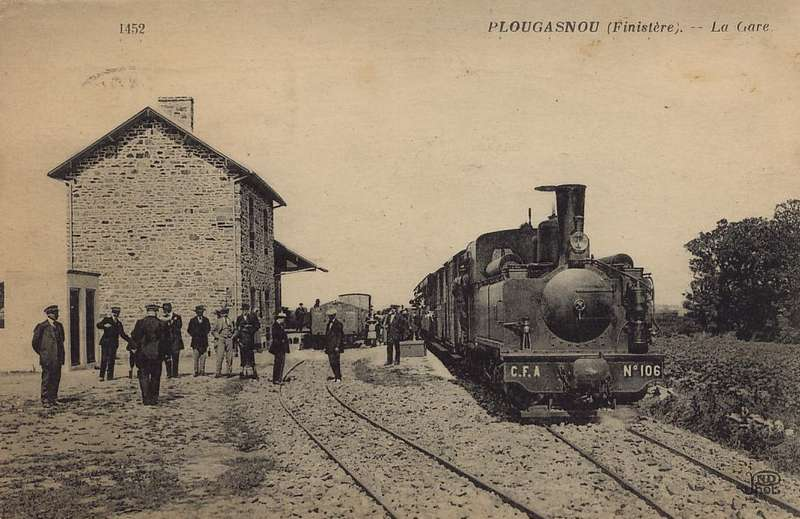
Gare de Plougasnou of the Chemins de fer Armoricains

The locomotives and other rolling stock also had a scaled-down appearance when compared with those of the larger networks. The steam locomotives were often tank engines, generally having three axles, with or without Bissel bogies front or rear. They were comparatively light, weighing from 8 to 25 t (7.9 to 24.6 long tons; 8.8 to 27.6 short tons) unladen. Later, petrol and diesel multiple units appeared as railbuses. Overall, these machines formed short trains of at most about a dozen small carriages or wagons, often far fewer.

Routes were quite short, some tens of kilometres, with operational speed below 20 km/h (12 mph). The slowness and rudimentary comfort of the secondary railways have passed into folk stories; anecdotes abound of unsavoury episodes, passengers getting off the train to push it up a steep hill, children hot-wiring cars to run alongside the breathing machine. Their users gave them nicknames: tortillards ("twisters"), tacots ("bangers"), coucous ("cuckoos"), yoyo (imitative, as on the Boisleux Marquion line), and so on.

Author Marcel Proust refers often to one such train service in his novel Within a Budding Grove, always using the full phrase "le petit chemin de fer d'intérêt local" in French, literally translated as "the little train of local interest".

== See also ==
- Main French railcar builders: Établissements Billard • De Dion-Bouton
- Main French VFIL locomotive builders: Corpet-Louvet • Pinguely
- Berck-Plage - Paris-Plage line
- Southwest Line

== Sources ==
- Sampité, A. (2010) [1888]. "Étude comparative des lois du 12 juillet 1865 et du 11 juin 1880 ("Comparative study of the laws from 12 July 1865 to 11 June 1880")". In Baudry & Comagnie (ed.). Les chemins de fer a faible trafic en France ("Small quiet railways in France") : lignes secondaires des grand réseaux, chemins de fer d'intérêt local et tramways a vapeur - établissement et exploitation (in French). BiblioLife. ISBN 978-1-145-90434-7.
- Domengie, Henri (1985). Les petits trains de jadis - Sud-Est de la France ("Small trans of yore - Southeast France") (in French). Breil-sur-Roya: Éditions du Cabri. ISBN 978-2-903310-34-9.
- Domengie, Henri (1986). Les petits trains de jadis - Sud-Ouest de la France ("Small trans of yore - Southwest France") (in French). Breil-sur-Roya: Éditions du Cabri. ISBN 978-2-903310-48-6.
- Domengie, Henri (1990). Les petits trains de jadis - Ouest de la France ("Small trans of yore - Western France") (in French). Breil-sur-Roya: Éditions du Cabri. ISBN 978-2-903310-87-5.
- Domengie, Henri (1995). Les petits trains de jadis - Nord de la France ("Small trans of yore - Northern France") (in French). Breil-sur-Roya: Éditions du Cabri. ISBN 978-2-908816-36-5.
- de Dieuleveult, Alain; Harouy, Michel (1988). Quand les petits trains faisaient la Manche ("When small trains crossed the Channel") (in French). Le Mans: Éditions Cénomane. ISBN 978-2-905596-29-1.
- Bertin, Hervé (1994). Petits Trains et Tramways haut-normands ("Small trains and tramways of Upper Normandy") (in French). Le Mans: Cénomane/La Vie du Rail. ISBN 978-2-905596-48-2.
- Legrand, Sandrine (1998). La reconstitution des voies ferrées d'intérêt local dans le Pas-de-Calais après la première guerre mondiale ("Reconstruction of Local Interest Railways after the First World War") (in French). Mémoires de maîtrise, Université d'Artois.
