= Tramways Électrique du Finistère =

The Tramways Électriques du Finistère (French pronunciation: [tʁamwɛ elɛktʁik dy finistɛʁ], TEF) were a 23 kilometres (14 mi) long 1,000 mm (3 ft 3 3/8 in), metre gauge, rural tramway connecting Brest with Le Conquet in Finistère. It was in operation between 1903 and 1932.

== History ==
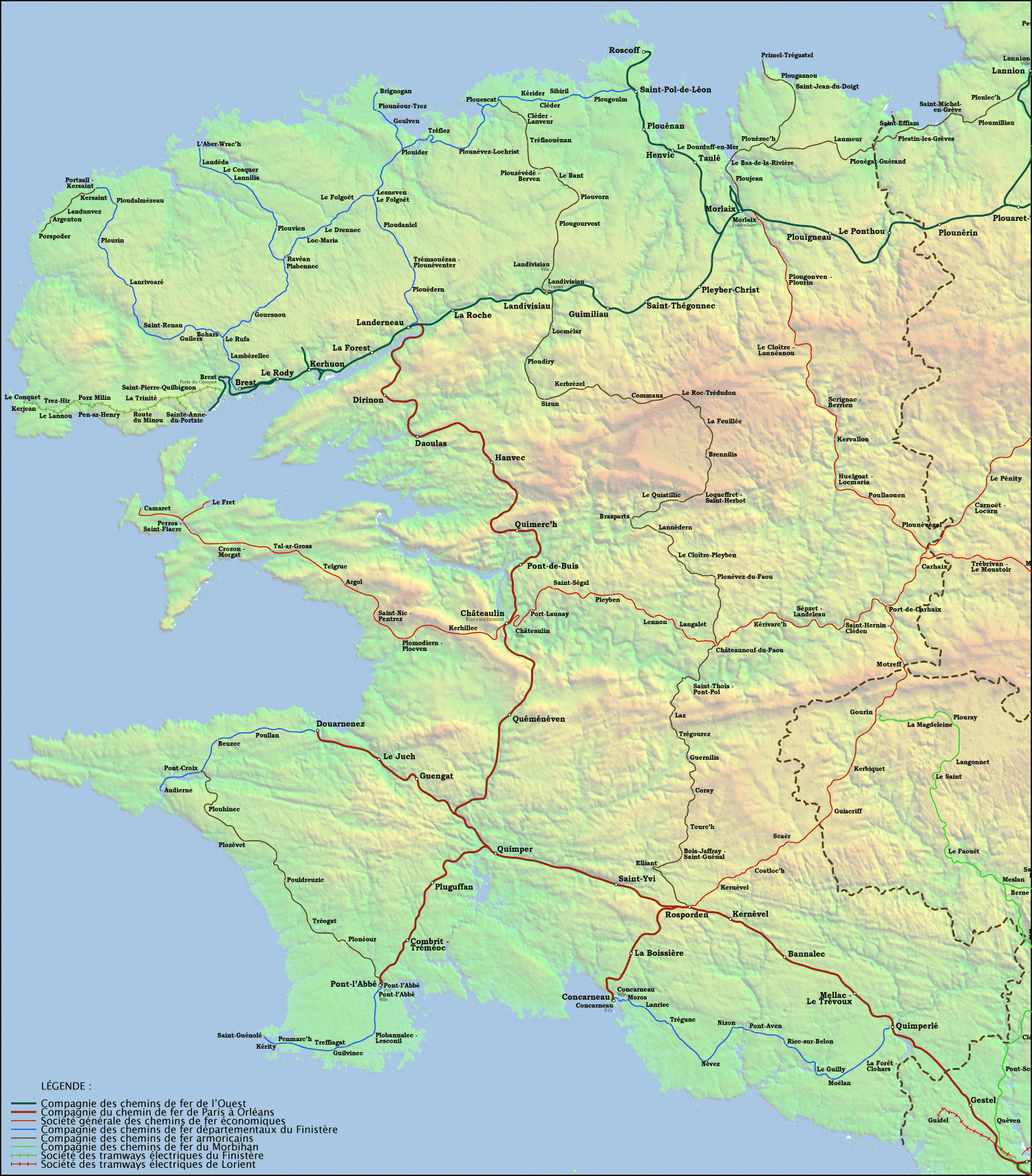
Railways in Finistère.

The first section of line, between St. Pierre-de-Quilbignon and Le Conquet opened on 12 July 1903. It replaced a three-horse omnibus known as l'Hirondelle (The Swallow), which had made just one return journey between Le Conquet and Brest daily. The engineer of the line was a M. Calvé. Over 12,000 passengers were carried in the first twenty days of operation. There were three main reasons the line was built. Firstly, to give the citizens of Brest access to the beaches at Ste. Anne-de-Portzic. Secondly, to enable the easy shipment of food to Brest. Thirdly, for military purposes in the event of an invasion.

The TEF was declared a Public Utility, and operated by the Société Anonyme des Tramways Électriques du Finistère, which was a separate company from the Compagnie des Tramways de Brest, which operated trams within the town of Brest itself. The head of both companies was M. Hérodote.The line was extended into Brest on August 5, 1908, the same year that a short branch opened to serve Ste. Anne-de-Portzic. The speed of the trams was limited to 20 kilometres per hour (12 mph) and a minimum of six return journeys was made each day. The line ran alongside public roads for its entire length. In 1922, operation of the line was taken over by the Chemins de fer départementaux du Finistère (CFDF).

The depot was at Pont Rohel, where the power station that supplied electricity for the line was also situated.

The branch to St. Anne-de-Portzic closed in September 1918 and reopened in 1925. The system closed on 5 October 1932.

== Operation ==
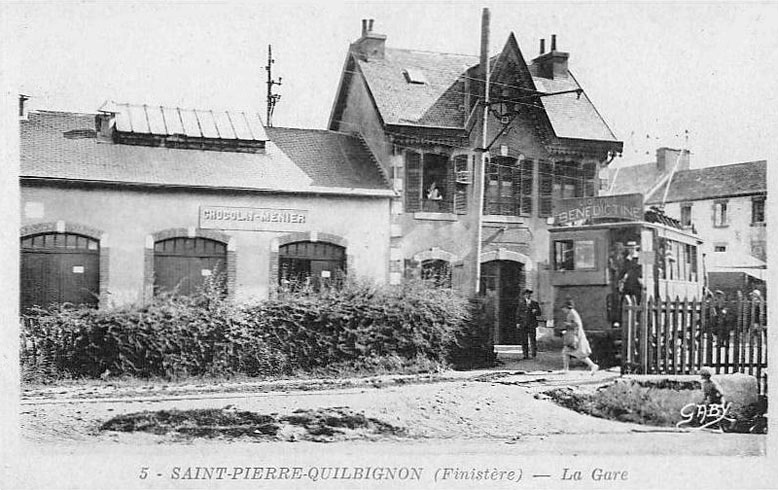
St Pierre Quilbignon station

When the line opened, fares were seven centimes per km for first class passengers and five centimes per km for second class. On Sundays, many people from Brest would take the tram to the beaches. A total of 84,757 passengers were carried in 1903, rising to 194,501 in 1904, 198,751 in 1905 and 210,827 in 1907.

The First World War brought competition from motor buses, a situation described by the company as "very precarious" in 1919. In 1920, the line carried 157,040 passengers, but it was decided to liquidate the company, leading to the takeover by the CFDF.

== Accidents ==
No major accidents were recorded in the history of the line. In the early years, there were collisions with cattle and horses on the line. Protests had been raised by the communes along the route that the construction of the line would hinder the freedom of the cattle to roam. Another problem was drunks sleeping between the rails. Five accidents were recorded in 1905 and six in 1906.
