= Chemin de fer des Côtes-du-Nord =

Railway in Côtes-du-Nord, France

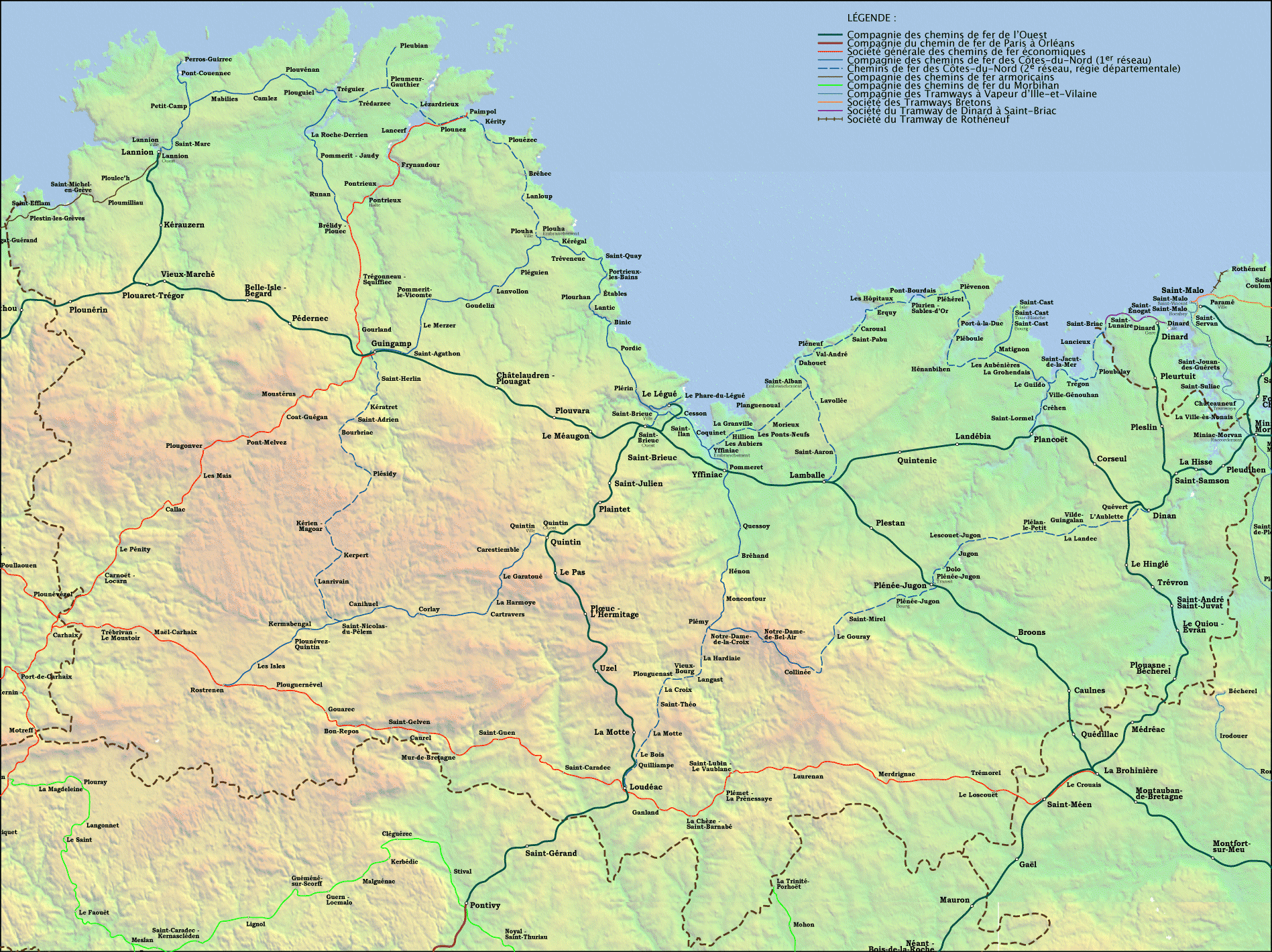
Former railways in Côtes-du-Nord

The Chemin de fer des Côtes-du-Nord (abbr. CdN, lit. Railway of the Côtes-du-Nord), the Côtes-d'Armor today, was a 1,000 mm (3 ft 3 3/8 in), metre gauge, railway in Côtes-du-Nord, France, although there were a few kilometres of line in Finistère and Ille-et-Vilaine. The first lines opened in 1905 and final closure was in 1956. The lines were a voie ferrée d'intérêt local system with a total extent of 457 kilometres (284 mi).

The system was constructed in two stages, the initial lines built between 1905 and 1907, and the extensions during and after the First World War which were opened between 1916 and 1926. These lines would make the CdN slightly bigger than the Réseau Breton.

The first closures were in 1937, but the Second World War gave the CdN a stay of execution, and parts of the system remained open until 1956.

== History ==
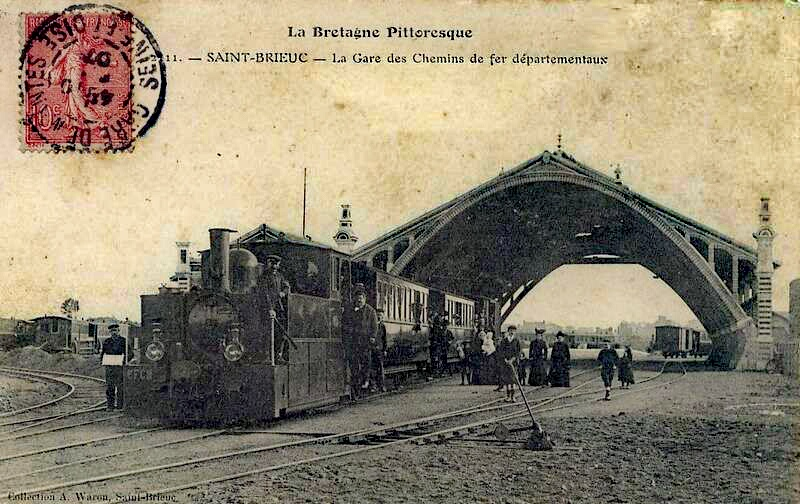
St. Brieuc station

The CdN had its headquarters at St. Brieuc. The first two lines to open were Paimpol – Lannion – St. Brieuc – Rostrenen and Plancoët – Lancieux in 1905. The engineer was Louis Auguste Marie Harel de la Noë, who built many of the bridges and viaducts in concrete. The CdN was noted for its heavy engineering, including the impressive viaducts viaduc du Souzain and viaduc du Toupin. In 1909, further extensions were authorised. St. Brieuc – Plemy – Loudéac, Plemy – Dinan, a connection to Plestin les Grèves to link to the Chemins de Fer Armoricains and other lines. These were not completed until 1926 owing to the First World War. Despite the introduction of railcars the first closures took place in 1937. Although some lines were reopened during World War II, by 1950 the only section open was St. Brieuc – Paimpol, which closed on 31 December 1956.

== Lines ==
The CdN system can be considered as four main lines, with their branches.

=== St. Brieuc – Plestin-les-Grèves ===
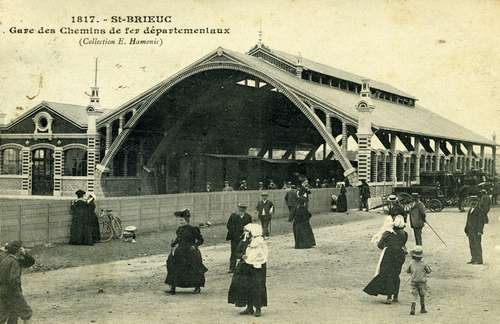
St. Brieuc station

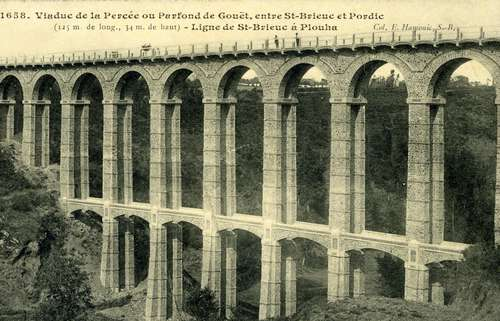
Viaduc du Parfond de Gouët

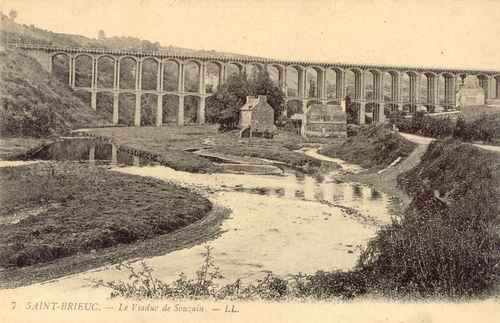
Viaduc de Souzain

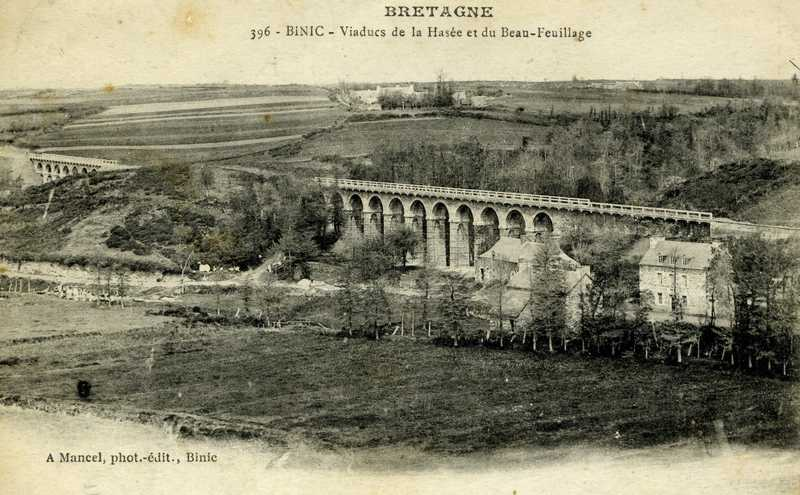
Viaduc de Beaufeuillage

The line from St. Brieuc Centrale to Plouha opened on 20 June 1905 and closed on 31 December 1956. St. Brieuc Centrale – St. Brieuc Ouest opened on 11 April 1907, giving a total length of 30.7 kilometres (19.1 mi). The line was very close to the coast in places, and heavily engineered, with thirteen bridges in 3 kilometres (1.9 mi). The main bridges were the Pont de Gouëdic and Pont de Rohannec'h at Saint-Brieuc, the Viaduc de Souzain between Saint-Brieuc and Plérin, the Viaduc de Colvé, Viaduc de Tosse-Montagne and Viaduc de Grognet and the Viaduc de la Horvaie at Plérin, the Viaduc du Parfond du Gouët (125 metres or 410 feet long, 34 metres or 111 feet 7 inches high), the Viaduc de la Hasée, Viaduc de Beaufeuillage and Pont en biais sur l'Ic at Binic, and the Viaduc de Ponto and Viaduc des Pourrhis at Étables-sur-Mer.

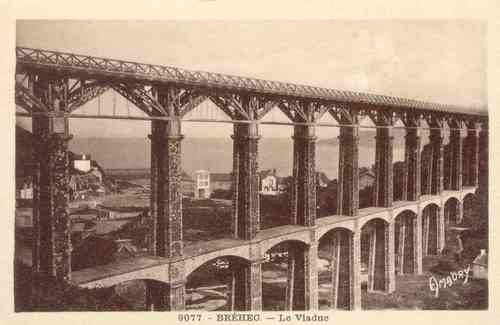
Viaduc de Bréhec

The 19 kilometres (12 mi) line between Plouha and Paimpol opened on 1 May 1924 and closed on 31 December 1956. The only major bridges were the Passarelles de Kermanach and the Viaduc de Bréhec between Plouézec and Plouha, which was demolished in 1972.

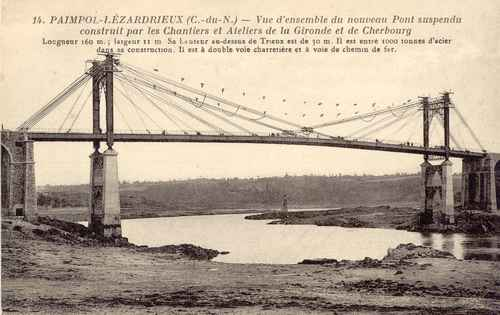
Viaduc de Lézardrieux

The 20-kilometre (12 mi) line between Paimpol and Tréguier opened on 1 May 1924 and closed on 31 March 1950. There were two major bridges on the line, the Viaduc de Lézardrieux near Trieux (160 metres or 525 feet long and 30 metres or 98 feet 5 inches high) and the Viaduc sur le Jaudy at Tréguier. This latter was destroyed by the Resistance in 1944. Reconstruction started in September 1946 but the central arch collapsed and the work was abandoned. The failure to rebuild the bridge accelerated the closure of the line west of Paimpol.

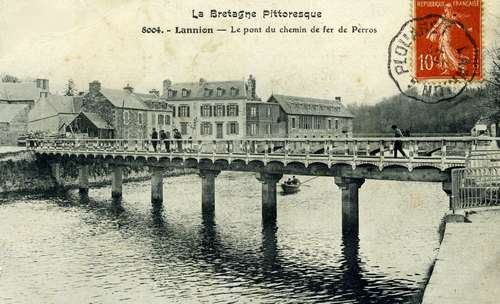
Pont sur le Léguer

The 6.1-kilometre (3.8 mi) line between Tréguier and Lannion opened on 11 August 1906 and closed on 15 April 1949. There were two stations at Lannion, Lannion-Ouest was opposite the station of the CF de l'Ouest. The other station was Lannion-Ville. The station at Perros-Guirec was situated by the harbour, and saw much tourist traffic from Lannion. The line had a junction with the Tréguiler – Lannion line at Petit Camp, and it was connected to Plestin-les-Grèves in the winter of 1916. The only major bridge was the Pont sur le Léguer between Lannion-Ouest and Lannion-Ville.

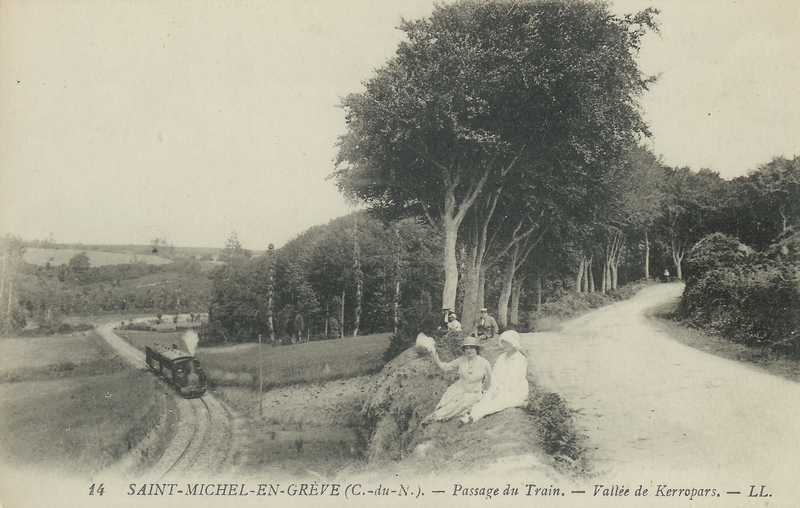
Train near St. Michel-en-Grève

The construction of the line between Lannion and Plestin-les-Grèves started in August 1912. Plestin-les-Grèves – Pont Menou opened on 21 July 1914 for passengers and 1 July 1915 for freight. This line linked with the Chemins de Fer Armoricains. The line between Lannion and Plestin-les-Grèves opened on 1 July 1915 to passengers and 15 July 1915 to freight. The line closed on 1 January 1937. The line was closed for four days in 1918 after damage caused by high tides between St. Efflam and St. Michel-en-Grève.

==== Branches ====
Construction of the 6-kilometre (3.7 mi) line between St. Brieuc and Le Phare was completed on 21 September 1905, but the line was not opened until 1 March 1906. Closure was on 31 December 1948. The line to Le Phare branched off the St. Brieuc – Plouha line on the Viaduc de Souzain. There were eight stations and halts. There were no major bridges after the line had branched off the Viaduc de Souzain.

The 25-kilometre (16 mi) line between Plouha and Guingamp opened on 20 June 1905 and closed on 15 May 1939. Guingamp station was a junction with the Réseau Breton (RB) line between Carhaix and Paimpol, and also with the standard gauge Chemins de Fer de l'Ouest. There was a short section of dual gauge line with the metre gauge rails laid between the standard gauge rails in an identical way to that seen on the Chemin de Fer de la Baie de Somme. The only major bridge was the Viaduc de Blanchardeau at Lanvollon.

The branch from Pleumier-Gautier to Pleubian opened on 1 May 1924 and closed on 31 March 1950.

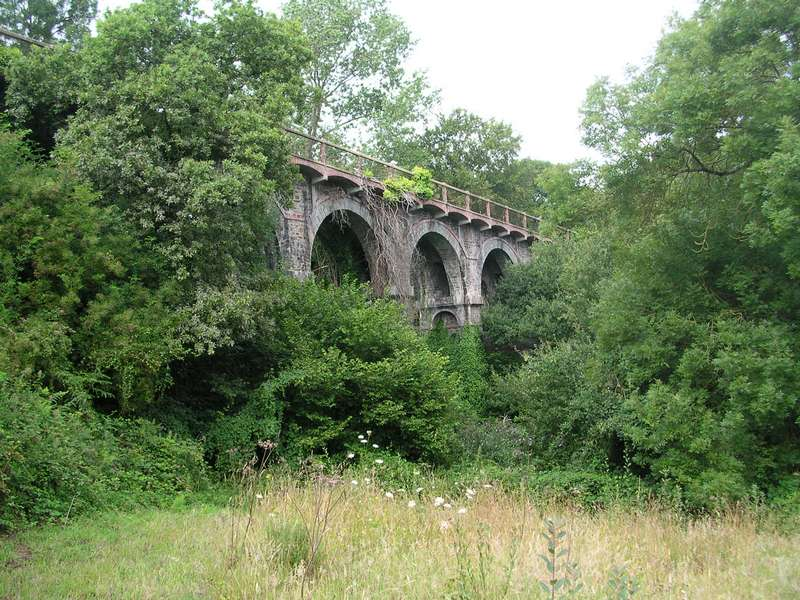
Viaduc de Kerdéozer, July 2005

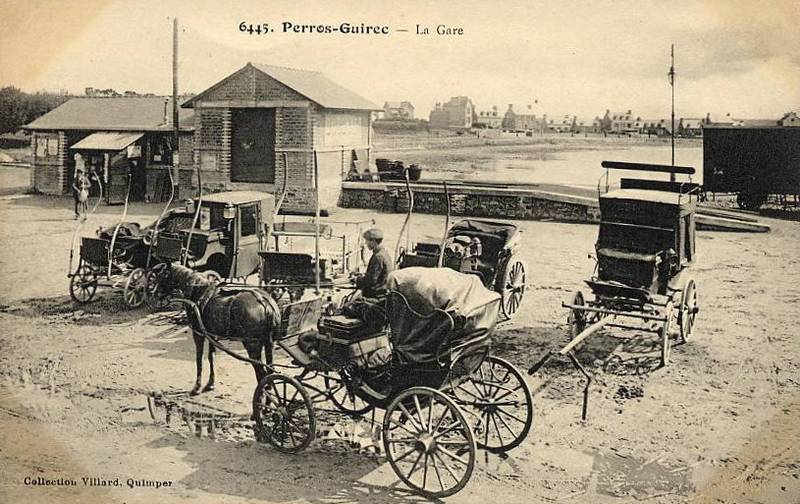
Perros-Guirec station

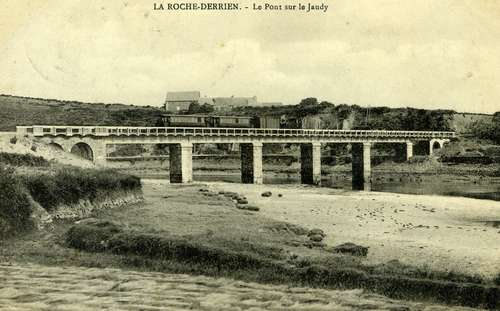
Pont sur le Jaudy

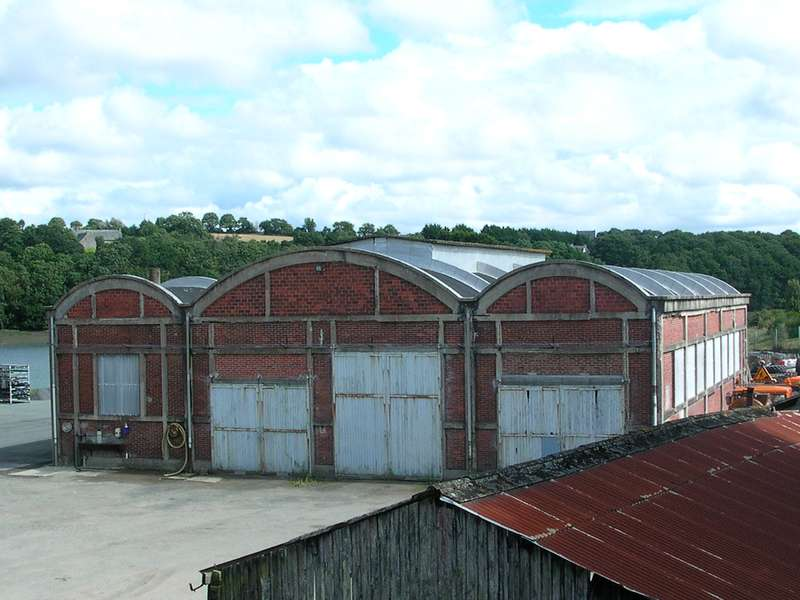
Tréguier depot in 2005

The 22.7-kilometre (14.1 mi) line between Petit Camp and Perros-Guirec opened on 11 August 1906 and closed on 15 April 1949. The line had a junction with the Lannion – Perros Guirec line at Petit Camp. The biggest accident in the history of the CdN occurred on this line in December 1920 (see Accidents section). The main bridges on the line were the Ponts Noirs between Tréuier and Plouguiel, and the Passerelles de Plougiel and Viaduc de Kerdéozer at Plouguiel.

The 17-kilometre (11 mi) line between Tréguier and Plouëc-du-Trieux opened on 9 March 1905 and closed on 15 May 1939. At Plouëc-du-Trieux there was a junction with the RB Guingamp – Paimpol line. Tréguier was the junction of lines to Lannion, Perros and Paimpol. It was also the site of a locomotive depot. The major bridges on this section of line were the Pont sur le Jaudy at La Roche Derrien, the viaduc de Loquélo at Minihy-Tréguier and the Pont du Chef du Bois at Pommerit-Jaudy.

=== St. Brieuc – Rostrenen ===
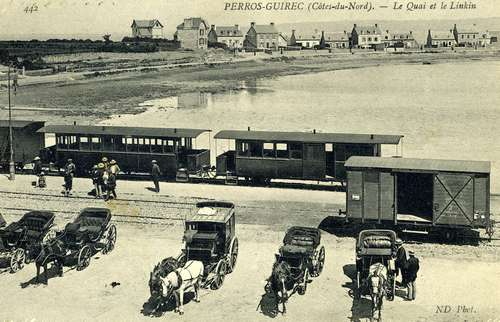
Perros-Guirec station

The 45 kilometres (28 mi) line between Quintin and Rostrenen opened on 15 May 1907 and closed on 1 August 1938. Quintin station was served by the CF de l'Ouest. Rostrenen was served by the Réseau Breton line between Carhaix and Loudéac. Until the construction of the Guingamp – St. Nicolas du Pélem line this line was isolated from the rest of the CdN network, although it was connected via the Réseau Breton. The only major bridge was the Passerelle de Quintin.

==== Branches ====
The 39.6 kilometres (24.6 mi) line between Guingamp and St. Nicolas opened on 12 January 1924 and closed on 1 August 1938. Guingamp was a major junction, with lines to St. Brieuc and Brest served by the Chemin de Fer de l'Ouest; lines to Carhaix and Paimpol served by the RB, and the line between St. Nicolas-du-Pélem and Plouha on the CdN network. At St. Nicolas-du-Pélem there was a junction with the Quintin – Rostrenen line. The major bridges were the Viaduc de Cadolan at Guingamp and the Viaduc de Kerlosquer at Ploumagoar.

=== St. Brieuc – Dinan ===
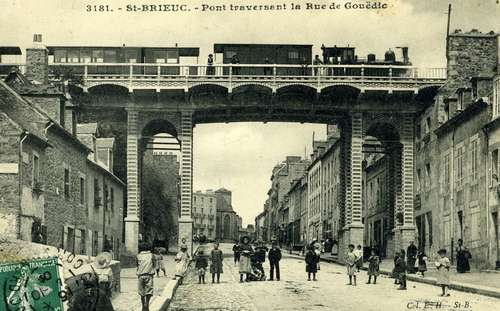
Pont de Gouëdic

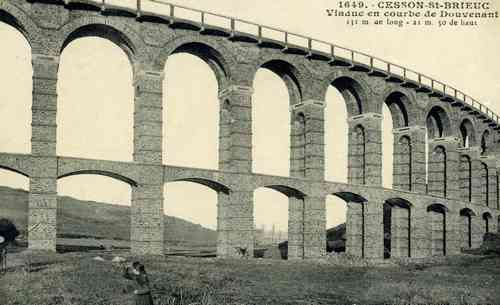
Viaduc de Douvenant

The 25.6 kilometres (15.9 mi) line between St. Brieuc and Moncontour opened on 1 May 1905 and closed to passengers on 1 April 1937. Final closure occurred on 27 April 1939. At Langueux, a branch was built to serve a brick and tile works, which supplied materials for the construction of the stations of the CdN. The main bridges on this section of line were the Viaduc de Souzain (290 metres (951 ft) long, 37 metres (121 ft 5 in) high), Pont de Gouëdic, Viaduc de Toupin and Pont des Courses at St. Brieuc, and the Viaduc de Douvenant (131 metres (430 ft) long, 31.5 metres (103 ft 4 in) high), Viaduc de Vau-Hervé and Pont de la Cage at Langueux. It is on this section of line that a heritage railway is being created.

The 15.7 kilometres (9.8 mi) line between Moncontour and Collinée opened on 1 July 1907 and closed on 24 April 1939. It was on this line that the CdN reached its highest point of 300 metres (984 ft 3 in) above sea level.

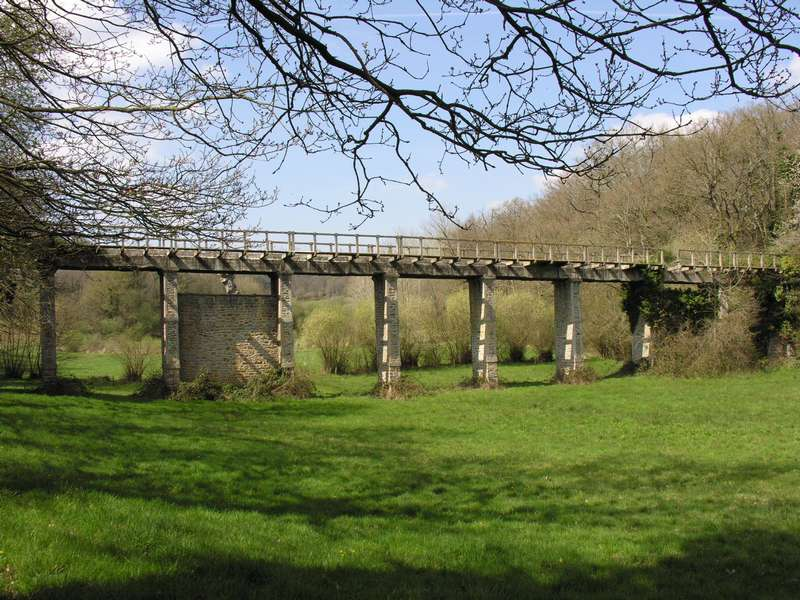
Passerelles du Gouray, 2005

The 47.1 kilometres (29.3 mi) line between Collinée and Dinan was an extension of the Moncontour – Collinée line. It opened on 8 October 1925 and closed on 1 April 1937. The lines' opening was delayed due to World War One. A projected line between Collinée and Merdrignac may have brought more traffic to the line and avoided its early closure. This line, had it opened, would have transformed Collinée into a major junction. The line crossed the Chemin de Fer de l'Ouest on the level at Jugon, following which it climbed in the direction of Dinan and passed through one of the few tunnels on the CdN network. At Dinan there was a bridge over the CF de l'Ouest's Dinan – La Brohinière line. The main bridges on the line were the Pont de l'Aublette at Dinan, the Pont du Marchis at Jugon and the Passerelles du Gouray at Gouray.

==== Branches ====
The 21.6 kilometres (13.4 mi) line between Plémy and Loudéac opened on 6 April 1925 and closed on 1 April 1937. The line had a junction with the line between Moncontour and Collinée. Loudéac station had a junction with the RB and CFde l'Ouest. The only major bridge was the Pont sur le Lie at Plouguenast.

=== St. Brieuc – Dinard ===
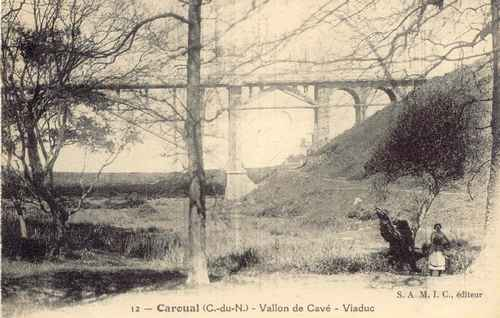
Viaduc de Caroual

The 51.5 kilometres (32.0 mi) line between Yffiniac and Matignon was opened in stages. Yfinniac – St. Alban on 23 February 1924, St. Alban – Erquy on 3 February 1924, Erquy – Pléherel on 3 November 1925, Pléherel – Pléheron on 27 June 1926 and Pléheron – Matignon on 27 June 1926. It closed on 31 December 1948. In 1929, a train derailed at Port à la Dux. The locomotive fell down an embankment and the driver was killed. The main bridges on the line were the Viaduc de Caroual ou de Cavé, the Ponceau de la Côtière and the Passerelle de la Côtière at Erquy, the Viaduc des Ponts-Neufs at Hillion (237.5 metres (779 ft) long, 27.6 metres (90 ft 7 in) high), the Viaduc du Préto at Pléneuf-Val-André and the Viaduc de Port-Nieux at Fréhel.

=== Branches ===
The 11.4 kilometres (7.1 mi) line between St. Alban and Lamballe opened on 11 July 1922 and closed on 31 December 1948. Lamballe station was also served by the Rennes – Brest line of the CF de l'Ouest.

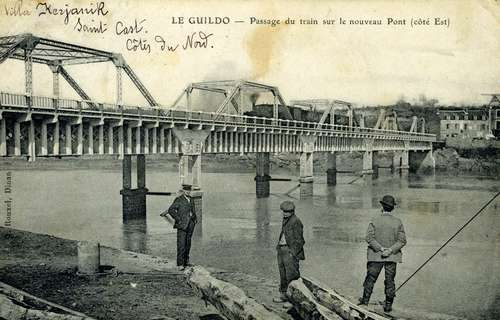
Pont de Guildo

The 18.7 kilometres (11.6 mi) line between Plancoët and St. Cast opened on 18 September 1905 and closed on 15 February 1939. The section between Matignon and St. Cast temporarily reopened from 12 October 1940. This isolated section of the CdN was linked to the rest of the network in 1926 with the opening of the Yffinac – Matignon and St. Brieuc – St. Cast lines. Plancoët station was also served by the CF de l'Ouest, and thus was quite an important station on the CdN network. The only major bridge was the Pond de Guildo which carried dual gauge track serving the Chemin de Fer de l'Ouest and the CdN. This bridge had five spans of 26.1 metres (85 ft 8 in) and an opening span of 12 metres (39 ft 4 in), giving a total length of 147.5 metres (483 ft 11 in). It was demolished in 1974.

The 11 kilometres (6.8 mi) line between Le Guildo and Lancieux opened on 14 July 1926. The section between St. Briac and Lancieux opened in 1932 and the entire line closed on 15 February 1939. Between Ploubalay and Lancieux the line ran alongside the road. The line connected with the St. Cast – Le Guildo line. The line was also to connect with the St. Briac – Dinard line of the Tramways Ille-et-Vilaine, but as the Pont sur le Frémur was completed in 1928 the Tramways Ille-et-Vilaine closed.

== World War Two ==
During World War Two, the CdN was requisitioned by the Germans for the construction of the Atlantic Wall. The Resistance were active in the area, with over fifty acts of sabotage recorded. In most cases the train crews were pre-warned and no injuries occurred. One of the most impressive was the destruction by the French Forces of the Interior of the viaduct between Jaudy and Tréguier on 15 August 1944, splitting the network in two.

== Rolling stock ==
A summary of the rolling stock used on the CdN.

=== Steam locomotives ===
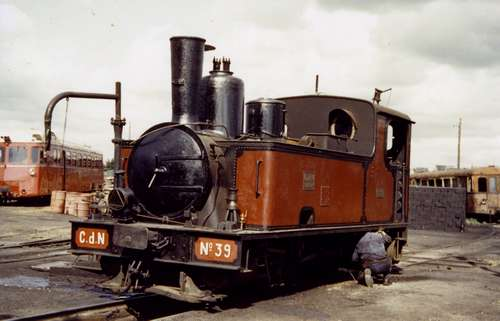
Corpet-Louvet #39, Gare Centrale

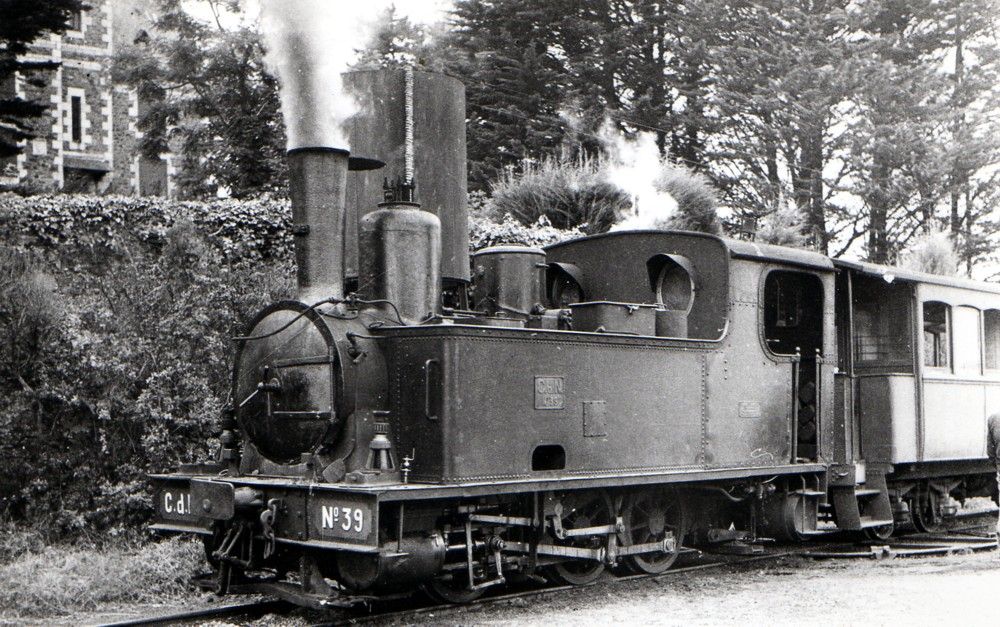
Corpet-Louvet #39

- 1–17 Blanc-Misseron 0-6-0T ordered 1903, weight 13 tonnes.
- 18–25 Blanc-Misseron 0-6-0T ordered 1905, weight 15.5 tonnes.
- 26–29 Corpet-Louvet 0-6-0T ordered 1908, weight 18.5 tonnes.
- 30–34 Corpet-Louvet 0-6-0T ordered 1922, weight 20 tonnes.
- 35–42 Corpet-Louvet 0-6-0T ordered 1925, weight 20.5 tonnes. Locomotive 36 carries works number 1679 of 1925 and is preserved at the Musée des tramways à vapeur et des chemins de fer secondaires français (MTVS), Butry-sur-Oise.
- 201–203 Corpet-Louvet 0-6-0T ordered 1915, weight 17 tonnes.
- Cail 0–6–0, weight 11 tonnes.
- Cail 0–6–0, weight 13 tonnes.
- 0-4-4-0 Mallett La Bretagne built by Gustrow in 1897, weight 36 tonnes. Acquired in 1924 but saw little use. Last known at work in 1937 at Moncontour.

=== Railcars ===
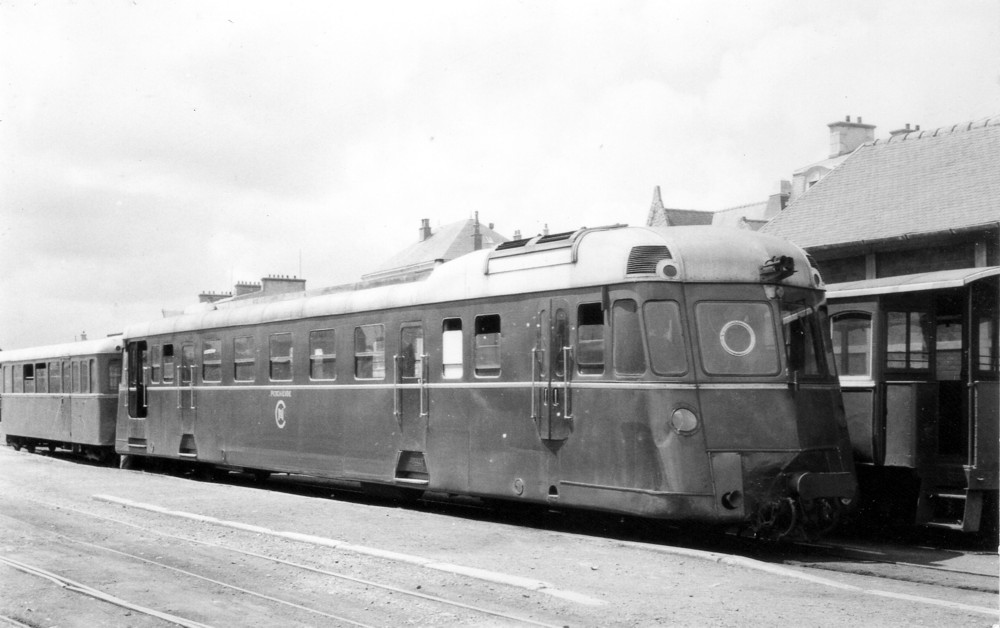
Renault ABH6 railcar

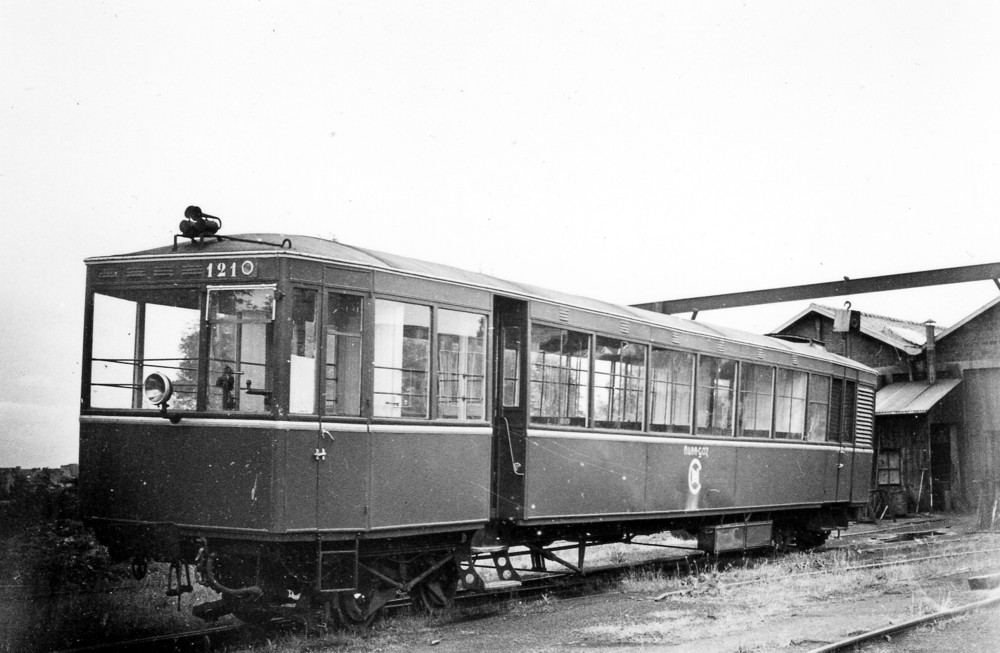
Renault-Scemia railcar #121

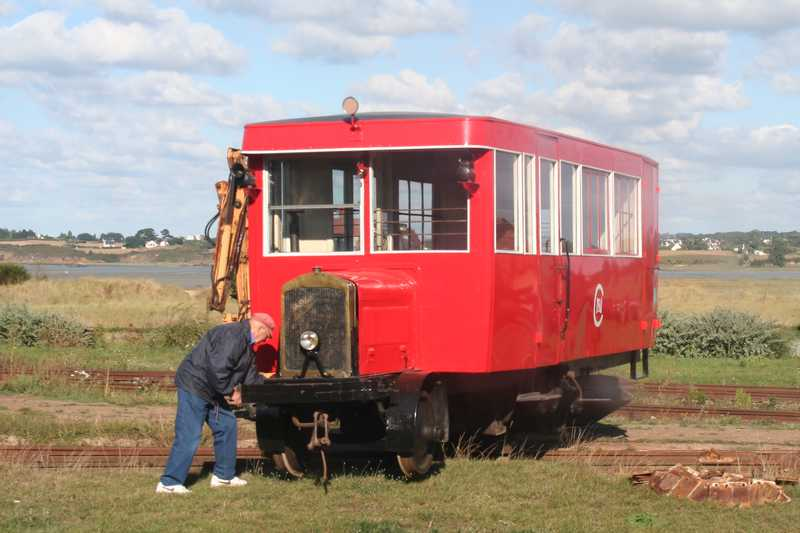
De Dion-Bouton JM4 railcar No. 11 preserved by AMTUIR

- 1–2 De Dion-bouton JA series railcar built 1923.
- 3–5 De Dion-bouton JM1 series railcar built 1925.
- 6–11 De Dion-bouton JM4 series railcar built 1932. No. 11 Preserved at the Musée des transports urbains, interurbains et ruraux, Colombes, Ile de France.
- 12–14 De Dion-bouton KG series railcar built 1927.
- 15–16 De Dion-bouton OC1 series railcar built 1936. No. 15 to RB then CFBS. Preserved at CFBS. No. 16 To RB, CFBS and Corsica. Preserved at ACFCdN.
- 17–21 Brissoneau et Lotz railcar ex Réseau du Finistère et du Morbihan
- 31–33 Renault ABH6 series railcar built 1946.
- 121 Renault-Scemia NK series railcar built 1924.
- 122 Renault-Scemia NX3 series railcar, ex Tramways d'Eure et Loir.

=== Passenger stock ===
- 29 mixed 1st and 2nd class carriages, numbered AB21 to AB47 and AB168-69.
- 69 2nd class carriages, numbered B48-49 and B101-167. B153 preserved by MTVS.
- 6 mixed 1st and 2nd class carriages with baggage compartment, numbered ABD1-6.
- 24 fourgons numbered D351-74. One (number unknown) preserved by ACFCdN, D355 and D370 preserved by MTVS.

Two of the passenger vehicles are preserved by ACFCdN.

=== Freight stock ===
- 119 vans, numbered K601–719. One vehicle preserved by ACFCdN.
- 100 former vans, converted to chassis trucks, numbered K801–900
- 291 tipper wagons, numbered UL1001 to 1291.
- 60 former tipper wagons, converted to chassis trucks, numbered UL1301–1360
- 114 flat wagons, numbered M1501–1594 and M1600–1619.
- 30 bolster wagons, numbered Mo2501–2530.

=== Departmental stock ===
- 4 Billard inspection vehicles ordered on 5 December 1932, and delivered on 3 February 1933.
- A five tonne rail mounted crane. Later used at Paimpol harbour after closure of the line.

== Accidents ==
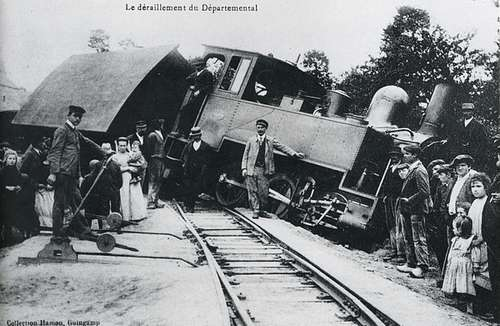
Derailment at Guingamp, 24 August 1909

There were a number of accidents on the CdN.

- On 19 October 1905, there was a collision between two trains at St. Brieuc.
- On 24 August 1909, a train was derailed in Guingamp. The locomotive involved was Blanc-Misseron No.18.
- On 18 December 1920, a train derailed at Tréguier; the locomotive, a carriage and a coal wagon came off the line on the Pont Neufs and some of the coal ended up in the river. Five people were slightly injured.
- On 14 September 1929, a train was derailed at Port-la-Duc. Locomotive No.34 fell down an embankment and the driver was killed. The cause was a landslip after heavy rain.
- On 7 July 1932, there was a collision between a car and a train on an ungated level crossing between St. Quay and Portrieux. Two people were killed.
- On 5 September 1933, there was a collision between a De Dion-Bouton railcar and a train hauled by a Corpet-Louvet 0-6-0 at Erquy. Three people were killed and twenty were injured.
- On 6 September 1936, there was a collision between a train and a bus on a level crossing at Mabiliès. Nine passengers on the bus were injured.
- On 29 November 1940, there was a derailment of a freight train on the Viaduc de Souzain. The locomotive fell off the viaduct, but the crew jumped clear before this happened.
- In November 1945, De Dion-Bouton OC1 railcar No. 16 derailed at a speed of nearly 150 kilometres per hour (93 mph) on the Viaduc de Souzain after brake failure.

== The line today ==
The station building at St. Brieuc survives today, used as a bus station. A viaduct at St. Brieuc also survives. The Viaduc du Douvenant, Viaduc de Val Hervé, Viaduc de Toupin and Pont des Courses survive.

== Preservation ==
A preservation society, (L'Association des Chemins de Fer des Côtes-du-Nord) was established in 1986 to recreate part of the CdN system. Based on the site of Boutdeville at Langueux (near Saint-Brieuc), they aim to recreate about 3 kilometres (1.9 mi) of line as a tourist attraction.

== Bibliography ==
=== Magazines and newspapers ===
- (in French) Revue d'histoire du Musée du Petit Train des Côtes-du-Nord, ACFCdN, n°1–19
- (in French) L'Indépendant du rail, n°114, août – septembre 1973
- (in French) L'Enthousiaste, n°13, avril 1979
- (in French) Brochures d'ANEMO sur les ouvrages d'art d'Harel de la Noë
- (in French) Le Télégramme, 29 décembre 2006
- (in French) Chemins de Fer Régionaux et Urbains, FACS, n°131
- (in French) Côtes-d'Armor, Hors-série n°4, mai 2005
- (in French) Serge Tilly & Alain Prigent, "La Bataille du rail dans les Côtes-du-Nord", Les Cahiers de la Résistance Populaire, n°}8/9.
- (in French) Voie Libre : n°2 ("Les derniers jours d'un vieillard d'avant-garde"); n°3 ("Des trains en habit rouge") et n°21 ("Le fabuleux réseau des Côtes du Nord CdN")

=== Books and brochures ===
- John Organ, Northern France Narrow Gauge, Middleton Press, 2002 ISBN 1-901706-75-3
- (in French) Jacqueline Cantaloube, Il était une fois... le Petit Train des Côtes-du-Nord, ACFCdN, 2005 ISBN 2-9511761-4-7
- (in French) Alain Cornu, Le Petit Train des Côtes-du-Nord, Cénomane, 1987 ISBN 2-905596-22-8
- (in French) Laurent Goulhen, Le Petit Train de Saint-Brieuc au Phare du Légué, ACFCdN, 1997 ISBN 2-9511761-0-4
- (in French) Louis Jourdan & Jean-Loïc Heurtier, 20 promenades autour des ponts du Petit-Train, ACFCdN, 1999 ISBN 2-9511761-1-2
- (in French) Laurent Goulhen, Petits Trains du Trégor : ligne Lannion-Plestin, Skol Vreizh, 2004 ISBN 2-915623-05-8
- (in French) Laurent Goulhen, L'album du Petit Train des Côtes-du-Nord, ACFCdN, 2005 ISBN 2-9511761-3-9
- (in French) Jean-Loïc Heurtier, Petits Trains des Côtes-du-Nord. Que reste-t-il ?, ACFCdN, 2003 ISBN 2-9511761-2-0
- (in French) Brochure du Centenaire, ACFCdN, 2005

=== DVD ===
- (in French) Les grands ponts du Petit Train, RS production, 2005
- Railway roundabout in Europe – part 1, Ian Allan publishing, 2006
- (in French) La grande épopée du Petit Train des Côtes-du-Nord, ACFCdN, 2006
- (in French) Harel de la Noë – Le père des ouvrages d'art du chemin de fer des Côtes-du-Nord, RS production, 2007
