= Chemins de fer départementaux du Finistère =

Railway system in Brittany, France

The Chemins de fer départementaux du Finistère (French pronunciation: [ʃəmɛ̃ də fɛʁ depaʁtəmɑ̃to dy finistɛʁ]) were a metre gauge railway system in northwest Brittany, France. It was opened in stages between 1893 and 1907, and closed in 1946. The system had a total extent of 214 kilometres (133 mi).

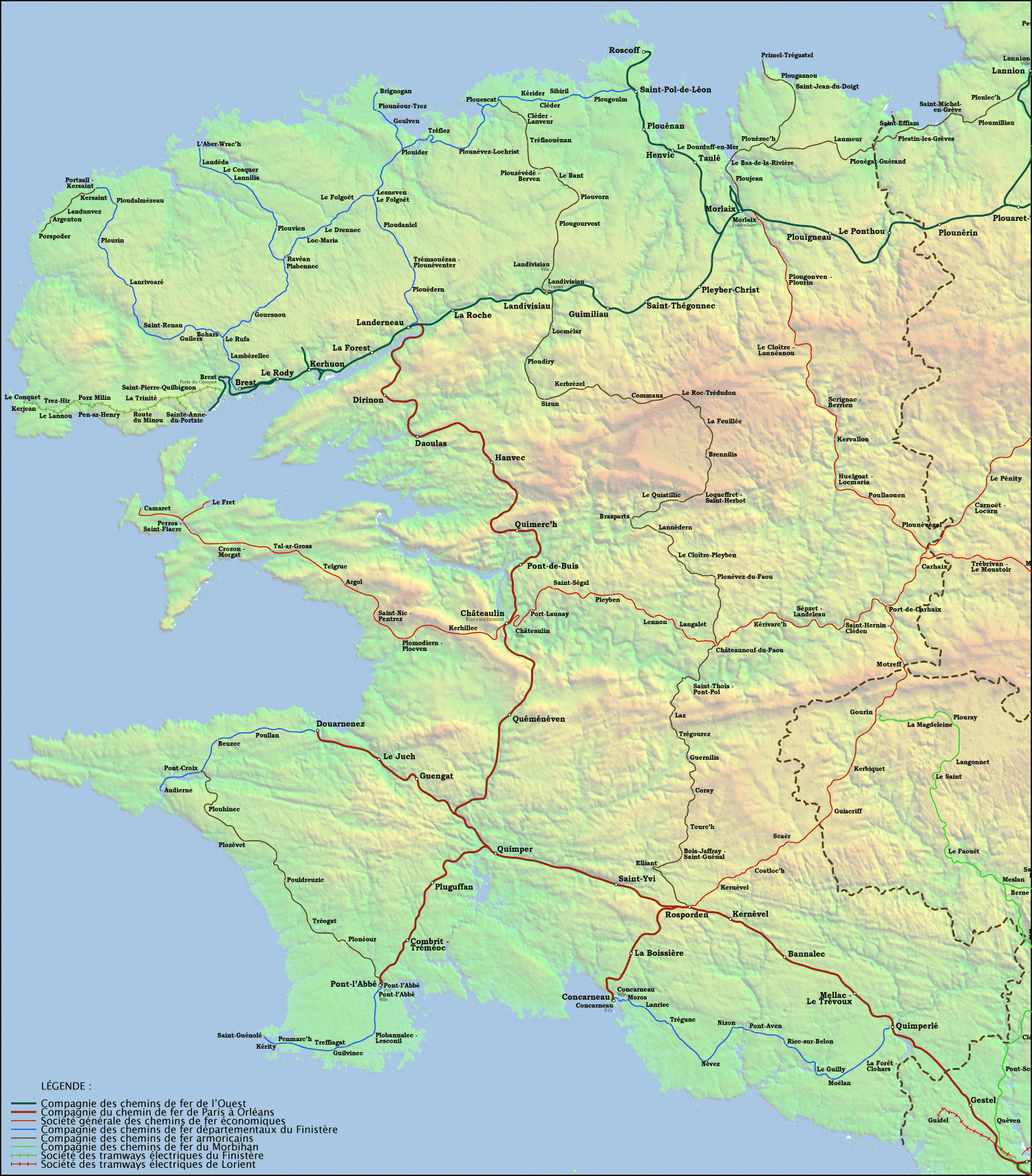
Former railways in Finistère

== History ==
The CFDF was a voie ferrée d'intérêt local. The main line ran from Brest to St. Pol-de-Léon with branches to Porspoder, L'Aber-Wrach, Brignognan and Quimperlé. The CFDF absorbed the Chemins de Fer Armoricains (CFA) in 1921 and the Tramways Électrique du Finistère in 1922. The railway was operated by the Compagnie des chemins de fer départementaux du Finistère until 1936, then by the Régie départementale des chemins de fer et autobus du Finistère until 28 February 1939 and finally by the Société générale de chemins de fer économique from 1941 to 1946. Service was suspended between 1939 and 1941.

The lines were to have closed from 28 February 1939, but with the outbreak of World War Two the lines were reopened. That is, except for the section from Brest and Lambezellec which was not reopened due to war damage. Public service resumed on 15 September 1941.

== Main line ==
The line from Brest - Le Rufa opened on 21 May 1893. La Rufa - Plabennec opened on 21 May 1893. Plabennec - Lesneven opened on 29 February 1904 Lesneven - Plouider opened in 1894. Plabennec - Les Neven and Plouider - Plouëscat opened in 1904. Plouëscat - St. Pol-de-Léon opened in 1907. Brest - Lambezellac closed in 1939 and Lambezellac - Lesneves closed on 6 October 1946 and Lesneves - St. Pol-de-Léon closed on 30 November 1946.

== Branch lines ==
Le Rufa - Ploudalmézeau opened on 21 May 1893 and Ploudalmézeau - Portsall opened in 1899. The line closed in 1935. Plabennec - Lannilis opened on 25 February 1894 and Lannilis - L'Aber-Wrach opened in 1900. The line closed in 1932. Plouider - Plounéour opened in 1894 and Plounéour - Brignonan opened on 1 July 1902. The line closed on 6 October 1946. Lesneven - Landerneau opened in 1894 and closed in 1946.

== Other lines ==
Quimperlé – Pont-Aven opened in 1894, Pont-Aven – Concarneau-Ville in 1903 and Concarneau-Ville – Concarneau-PO in 1908. The line closed in 1936. Audierne – Douarnenez opened in 1894 and closed in 1946. Pont-l'Abbé – Saint-Guénolé opened in 1907 and closed before the Second World War. The line was transferred to the Réseau Breton and converted to standard gauge in 1947, and closed in 1963.

== Chemins de fer armoricains ==
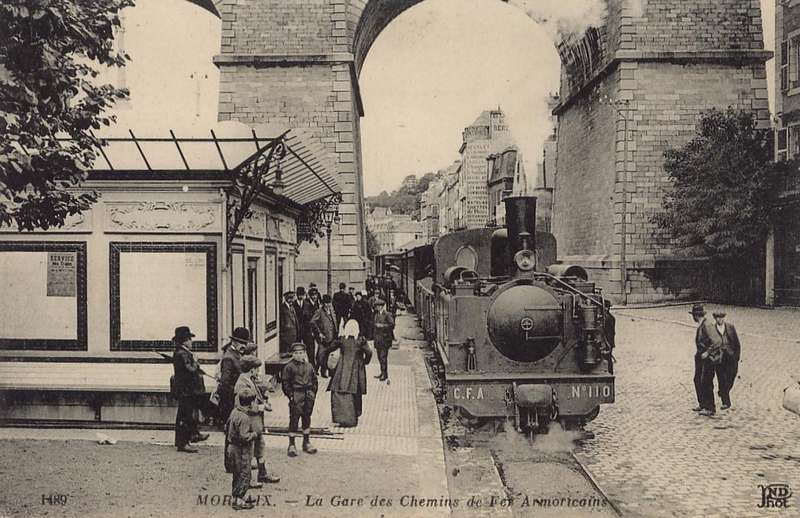
Morlaix station

The Chemins de fer armoricains (CFA) was a metre gauge railway in Finistère, with a few kilometres of track in Côtes du Nord. It opened in 1912 and was absorbed by the Chemins de fer départementaux du Finistère in 1921. The total extent of the CFA was 213 kilometres (132 mi).

=== Lines ===
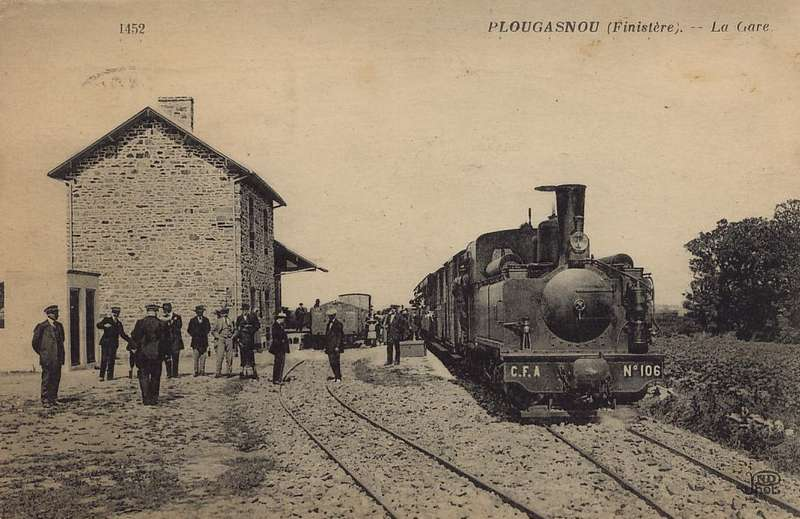
Plougasnou station

Plouézoch - Primel-Trégastel opened on 1 May 1912 and the 12-kilometre (7.5 mi) line closed in 1934. Morlaix - Plouézoch opened on 1 May 1912. Plouézoch - Pont-Menou opened on 1 March 1913, a total of 26 kilometres (16 mi). Pont-Menou - Plestin-les-Grèves opened on 1 May 1923. This line connected with the Chemin de Fer des Côtes-du-Nord. Plouézoch - Plestin les Grèves closed in 1932 and Morlaix - Plouézoch closed on 4 October 1934. Another source gives an opening date for Plestin les Grèves - Pont Menou of 21 July 1914 for passengers and 1 July 1915 for freight, with Plestin - Lannion opening on 1 July 1916 for passengers and 15 July 1916 for freight. A closure date is given of 1 January 1937. Pont-l'Abbé - Pont-Croix opened on 1 October 1912 and the 35-kilometre (22 mi) line closed in 1933. The 132-kilometre (82 mi) Plouëscat - Rosporden line opened in sections in 1912; Landivisiau - La Feuilée on 11 June, Plouëscat - Landivisiau on 10 October, La Feuilée - Châteauneuf de Faou on 25 November and Châteauneuf de Faou - Rosporden on 21 December. Landivisiau - Rosporden closed in 1935 and Plouëscat - Landivisiau closed in 1946. Portsall - Porspoder opened on 13 May 1913 and the 8-kilometre (5.0 mi) line closed in 1935.

== Accidents & incidents ==
The CFA line between Lannion and Plestin was damaged by high tides at St. Efflan, where the line ran along the shore, on 22 September 1918. Service was resumed on 27 September. There were derailments at Ploumillau on 24 August 1917 and 15 July 1918; St. Michel-en Grève on 23 October 1923 (this one was due to defective track); at St. Efflam on 21 October 1923, 29 March and 30 March 1924 (the latter because the driver had not been notified of the poor condition of the track). None of these accidents was of a serious nature.

== The routes today ==
Sections of the CFA trackbed are visible in the Ploumillau, St. Michel-en-Grève, Ponceau and Le Mouster areas. The trackbed between Plestin les Grèves and St. Efflam is a cycle and footpath. Plougasnou station building survives.

== Rolling stock ==
=== CFDF ===
Steam locomotives

The first locomotive was built by Amédée Bollée in 1892. It carried number 1 and was named Brest. Apart from this locomotive, all CFDF locomotives were Corpet-Louvet 0-6-0Ts.

- 1 Brest Amédée Bollée built 1892, this locomotive had a vertical boiler.
- 1 Corpet Louvet 0-6-0. Weight 15 tonnes (14.8 long tons; 16.5 short tons), driving wheels 900 millimetres (2 ft 11 in) diameter. Boiler pressure 10 kg/cm^{2} (142 lbf/in^{2}).
- 2 Corpet Louvet 0-6-0. Weight 15 tonnes (14.8 long tons; 16.5 short tons), driving wheels 900 millimetres (2 ft 11 in) diameter. Boiler pressure 10 kg/cm^{2} (142 lbf/in^{2}).
- 3 Corpet Louvet 0-6-0. Weight 15 tonnes (14.8 long tons; 16.5 short tons), driving wheels 900 millimetres (2 ft 11 in) diameter. Boiler pressure 10 kg/cm^{2} (142 lbf/in^{2}).
- 4 Corpet Louvet 0-6-0. Weight 15 tonnes (14.8 long tons; 16.5 short tons), driving wheels 900 millimetres (2 ft 11 in) diameter. Boiler pressure 10 kg/cm^{2} (142 lbf/in^{2}).
- 5 Corpet Louvet 0-6-0. Weight 15 tonnes (14.8 long tons; 16.5 short tons), driving wheels 900 millimetres (2 ft 11 in) diameter. Boiler pressure 10 kg/cm^{2} (142 lbf/in^{2}).
- 6 Corpet Louvet 0-6-0. Weight 15 tonnes (14.8 long tons; 16.5 short tons), driving wheels 900 millimetres (2 ft 11 in) diameter. Boiler pressure 10 kg/cm^{2} (142 lbf/in^{2}).
- 7 Corpet Louvet 0-6-0. Weight 15 tonnes (14.8 long tons; 16.5 short tons), driving wheels 900 millimetres (2 ft 11 in) diameter. Boiler pressure 10 kg/cm^{2} (142 lbf/in^{2}).
- 8 Corpet Louvet 0-6-0. Boiler pressure 10 kg/cm^{2} (142 lbf/in^{2}).
- 9 Corpet Louvet 0-6-0. Boiler pressure 10 kg/cm^{2} (142 lbf/in^{2}).
- 10 Corpet Louvet 0-6-0. Boiler pressure 10 kg/cm^{2} (142 lbf/in^{2}).
- 11 Corpet Louvet 0-6-0. Boiler pressure 10 kg/cm^{2} (142 lbf/in^{2}).
- 12 Corpet Louvet 0-6-0. Boiler pressure 10 kg/cm^{2} (142 lbf/in^{2}).
- 13 Corpet Louvet 0-6-0. Boiler pressure 12.5 kg/cm^{2} (178 lbf/in^{2}).
- 14 Corpet Louvet 0-6-0. Boiler pressure 12.5 kg/cm^{2} (178 lbf/in^{2}).
- 15 Corpet Louvet 0-6-0. Boiler pressure 12.5 kg/cm^{2} (178 lbf/in^{2}).
- 16 Corpet Louvet 0-6-0. Boiler pressure 12.5 kg/cm^{2} (178 lbf/in^{2}).
- 17 Corpet Louvet 0-6-0. Boiler pressure 12.5 kg/cm^{2} (178 lbf/in^{2}).
- 18 Corpet Louvet 0-6-0. Boiler pressure 12.5 kg/cm^{2} (178 lbf/in^{2}).
- 19 Corpet Louvet 0-6-0. Boiler pressure 12.5 kg/cm^{2} (178 lbf/in^{2}).
- 20 Corpet Louvet 0-6-0. Boiler pressure 12.5 kg/cm^{2} (178 lbf/in^{2}).
- 21 Corpet Louvet 0-6-0. Boiler pressure 12.5 kg/cm^{2} (178 lbf/in^{2}).
- 22 Corpet Louvet 0-6-0. Boiler pressure 12.5 kg/cm^{2} (178 lbf/in^{2}).
- 23 Corpet Louvet 0-6-0. Boiler pressure 12.5 kg/cm^{2} (178 lbf/in^{2}).
- 24 Corpet Louvet 0-6-0. Boiler pressure 12.5 kg/cm^{2} (178 lbf/in^{2}).
- 25 Corpet Louvet 0-6-0. Boiler pressure 12.5 kg/cm^{2} (178 lbf/in^{2}).
- 26 Corpet Louvet 0-6-0. Boiler pressure 12.5 kg/cm^{2} (178 lbf/in^{2}).
- 27 Corpet Louvet 0-6-0. Boiler pressure 12.5 kg/cm^{2} (178 lbf/in^{2}).
- 28 Corpet Louvet 0-6-0. Boiler pressure 12.5 kg/cm^{2} (178 lbf/in^{2}).
- 29 Porspoder Corpet Louvet 0-6-0. Works number 1403/19??. Boiler pressure 12.5 kg/cm^{2} (178 lbf/in^{2}).

Railcars

In 1922, trials were undertaken with railbuses between Plouëscat and Rosporden. As a result of the trials, three railcars and three trailers were purchased initially, later more railbuses were added to the fleet. The railbuses were from three different manufacturers.

- GMC/Baert & Verney - eleven railcars constructed on GMC 2 ton truck chassis by Baert & Verney at Le Mans. These railcars were powered by a 22 hp (16 kW) engine. They seated 24, with 16 standing. They were single ended and had to be turned on a turntable at the end of their journey. Single axle trailers were hauled, seating another 20 people.
- Panhard - these railcars had an 80 hp engine and seated 32 people.
- Brissoneau & Lotz - These railcars were powered by a 135 hp (101 kW) diesel engine, with electric transmission. They seated 52 people, plus a baggage compartment.

Carriages

- 11 first class, seating 16 with 6 standing.
- 30 second class, seating 16 with 6 standing
- 3 first / second, seating 10 first, 6 second, with 4 standing.
- 4 first / second, seating 6 first, 10 second, with 4 standing.
- 8 second class, seating 16 with 8 standing.
- 10 open sided second class, seating 16 with 8 standing. Used in the summer.

Goods vehicles

- 82 K series vans, 37 with Westinghouse brakes.
- 39 H series tipper wagons, 18 with Westinghouse brakes.
- 17 L series tipper wagons, 6 with Westinghouse brakes.
- 60 M series dropside open wagons, 26 with Westinghouse brakes.
- 10 bogie bolster wagons.
- 2 wagons de secours.

=== CFA ===
The first three locomotives supplied to the CFA Lannion - Plestin line were built by Corpet-Louvet, followed by one from Blanc-Misseron. In the last years of operation a De Dion-Bouton railbus was used.

Steam locomotives

- 3 Corpet-Louvet locomotives, including
- 106 Corpet-Louvet 0-6-0.
- 110 Corpet-Louvet 0-6-0.
- 1 Blanc-Misseron locomotive.

Railbuses

- 1 De Dion-Bouton railbus.

Carriages

Goods vehicles

- 48 J series covered vans, 19 with Westinghouse brake.
- 38 K series tarpaulin wagons.
- 32 L series open wagons.
- 20 M series dropside open wagons.
- 14 N series open wagons.
- 6 P series flat wagons.
