= Douvenant Viaduct =

Douvenant Viaduct (viaduc de Douvenant)
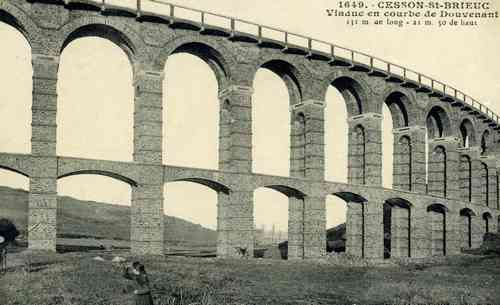
- Douvenant Viaduct at the start of the 20th Century
- Coordinates: 48.51674°N 2.71829°W
- Carries: Saint-Brieuc - Moncontour line Saint-Brieuc - Saint-Briac line
- Locale: Saint-Brieuc

Characteristics
- Total length: 130.8 metres (429 ft)
- Height: 22.8 metres (75 ft)
- No. of spans: 15

History
- Architect: Louis Auguste Harel de La Noë
- Construction start: 1903
- Construction end: 1905

Location
- Interactive map of Douvenant Viaduct

The Douvenant Viaduct (viaduc de Douvenant) is a circular railway viaduct built between 1903 and 1905 for the Chemin de Fer des Côtes-du-Nord, between the French communes of Saint-Brieuc and Langueux. It was used by the Saint-Brieuc - Moncontour line and the Saint-Brieuc - Saint-Briac line. It was designed by Louis Auguste Harel de La Noë and is the grandest in a series of thirteen "grognet" type viaducts.

== Dimensions ==
- 15 arches, each 6 metres (19.69 ft) wide
- Total length 130.8 metres (429 ft)
- Height 22.8 metres (75 ft)
- Curvature: 109 metres (358 ft)
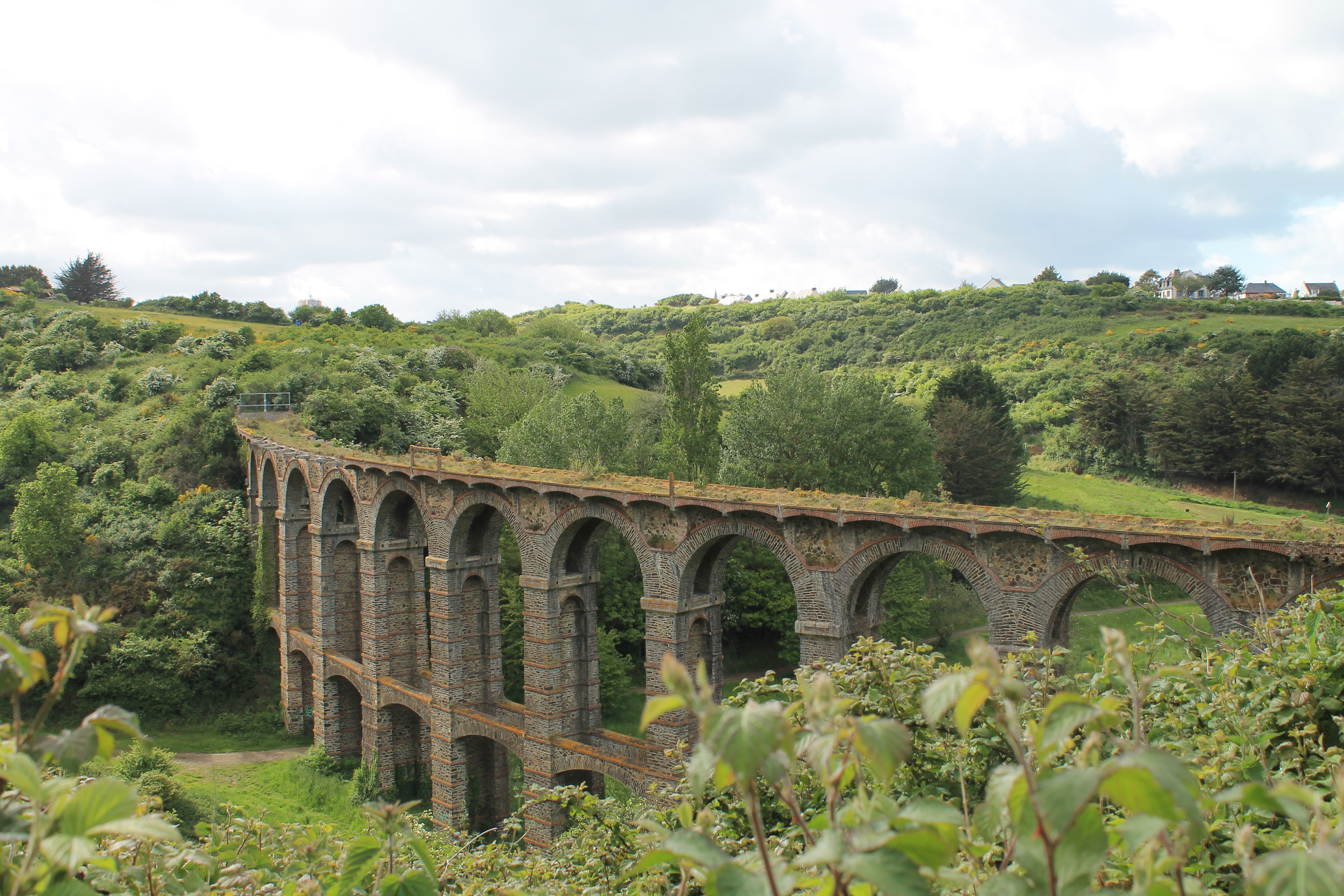
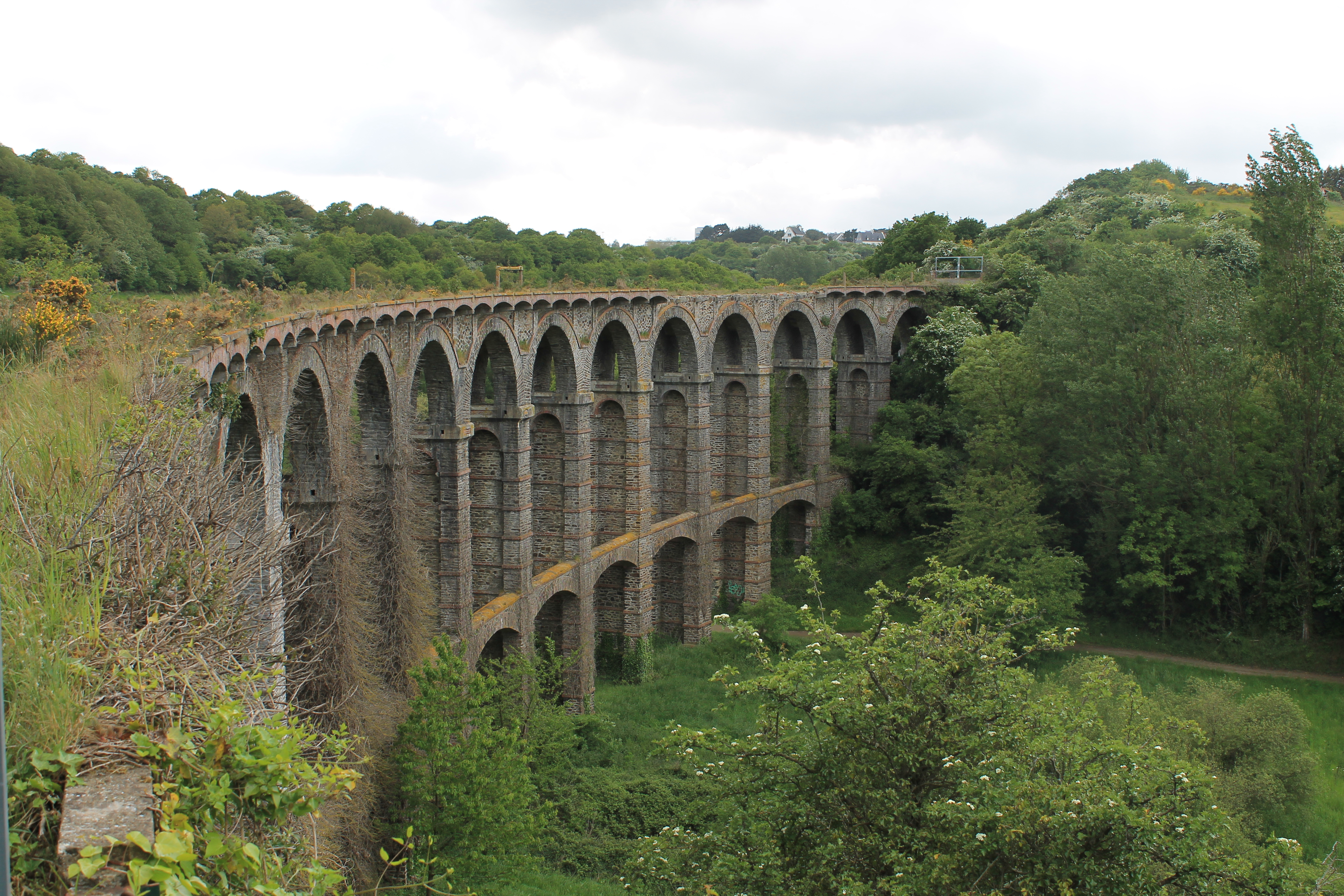
Douvenant Viaduct in 2013

== Future ==
The Association des Chemins de Fer des Côtes-du-Nord is constructing a heritage railway line that will use the viaduct.
